= List of settlements in Zanzibar =

The following is a list of settlements in Zanzibar:

== Unguja (Zanzibar) Island ==
- Bondeni
- Bububu
- Bumbwini
- Bwejuu
- Chuini
- Chukwani
- Chwaka
- Dimbani (Kizimkazi Dimbani)
- Fukuchani
- Fumba
- Fuoni
- Jambiani
- Jendele
- Jozani
- Kae
- Kendwa
- Kibaoni
- Kibweni
- Kinyasini
- Kitogani
- Kiwengwa
- Kizimkazi (Kizimkazi Mtendeni)
- Koani
- Mahonda
- Makunduchi
- Mangapwani
- Matemwe
- Mbweni
- Mchangani
- Michenzani
- Mkokotoni
- Mtoni
- Mwana Kwerekwe
- Mwembe Ladu
- Mwera
- Mzambarauni
- Nungwi
- Paje
- Pete
- Pingwe
- Pongwe
- Regezo Mwendo
- Stone Town
- Tunguu
- Unguja Ukuu
- Uroa
- Zanzibar City

=== Tumbatu Island ===
- Jongowe
- Kichangani

=== Uzi Island ===
- Uzi

== Pemba Island ==
- Chake-Chake
- Chambani
- Chwaka
- Chwale
- Daya
- Gando
- Jiso
- Jondeni
- Kendwa
- Kengeja
- Kisutu
- Kiuyu
- Konde
- Likoni
- Machomane
- Mailitano
- Makongeni
- Maziwa Ngombe
- Mchangani
- Micheweni
- Mkoani
- Mtambile
- Mtangani
- Mtekofi
- Mzambaraoni
- Ngagu
- Ole
- Pujini
- Verani
- Vitongoji
- Wambaa
- Wesha
- Wete

=== Kojani Island ===
- Kojani
