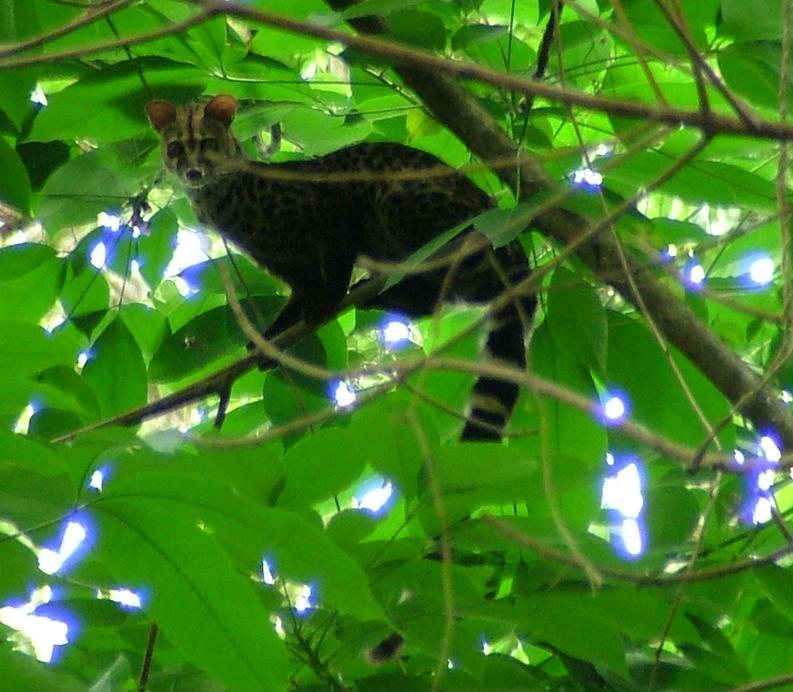

Conservation status
- Least Concern (IUCN 3.1)

Scientific classification
- Kingdom: Animalia
- Phylum: Chordata
- Class: Mammalia
- Order: Carnivora
- Family: Viverridae
- Genus: Genetta
- Species: G. servalina

Binomial name
- Genetta servalina Pucheran, 1855
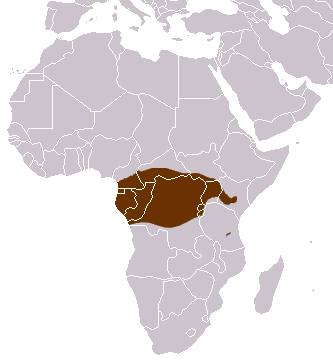
- Servaline genet range

= Servaline genet =

Species of carnivore

The servaline genet (Genetta servalina) is a genet species native to Central Africa. As it is widely distributed and considered common, it is listed as Least Concern on the IUCN Red List.

== Characteristics ==
The servaline genet's fur is rufous with black spots on neck, back and sides. Its feet are black. Its long tail is banded with wide black and narrow white rings. It is short-haired and has a dark broken stripe along the spine. The tip of its tail is bright.

Measurements of male museum specimens range from 490 to 510 mm (19 to 20 in) in head and body with a 450 to 465 mm (17.7 to 18.3 in) long tail. Females range from 445 to 495 mm (17.5 to 19.5 in) in head and body with a 368 to 485 mm (14.5 to 19.1 in) long tail.

== Distribution and habitat ==
The servaline genet is distributed from the Sanaga River in Cameroon southwards to the Congo Basin and eastwards to Uganda and Tanzania. In the Republic of Congo, it was recorded by camera-traps in the Western Congolian forest–savanna mosaic of Odzala-Kokoua National Park during surveys in 2007.

In Tanzania's Udzungwa Mountains, a Lowe's servaline genet was recorded in 2000 and photographed in 2002 for the first time. In 2005, camera trap records were also obtained in the Uluguru and Nguru ranges at altitudes of 950–1,400 m (3,120–4,590 ft). It is thought possible that it also occurs in other parts of the Eastern Arc Mountains.

The Zanzibar servaline genet is endemic to Unguja Island, Zanzibar, and became known to science in 1995 when a specimen was killed close to the Jozani forest. Several individuals were recorded by camera traps for the first time in January 2003 in the Jozani-Chwaka Bay National Park.

== Taxonomy ==
The servaline genet was first described by Jacques Pucheran in 1855. Five subspecies are recognised:

- G. s. servalina, the nominate subspecies
- G. s. bettoni (Thomas, 1902)
- G. s. schwarzi (Crawford-Cabral, 1970)
- Lowe's servaline genet (G. s. lowei) (Kingdon, 1977) was described on the basis of a single skin collected in 1932 by Willoughby Prescott Lowe in the Udzungwa Mountains, Tanzania.
- Zanzibar servaline genet (G. s. archeri) (Van Rompaey and Colyn, 1998)

The crested servaline genet (G. cristata) was also considered to be a subspecies of the servaline genet, but is now generally regarded as a distinct species.
