= Fumba Free Economic Zone =

Urban development site in southwestern Unguja

Coordinates: 6°17′0″S 39°15′45″E

Fumba Free Economic Zone Eneo Maalum la Kiuchumi la Fumba / Eneo Huru la Kiuchumi na Uwekezaji Fumba
- Special Economic Zone
- Country: Tanzania ( Zanzibar)
- Region: Mjini Magharibi
- District: Magharibi B
- Demarcated: 1992
- Named for: Fumba Peninsula
Shehias
Contains territory from:
- Shakani
- Nyamanzi
- Kombeni
- Dimani
- Bweleo
- Fumba

Government
  - Body: Zanzibar Investment Promotion Agency

Area
  - Total: 3,000 ha (7,400 acres)
- Time zone: UTC+3 (East Africa Time)

The Fumba Free Economic Zone is a 3,000 hectare special economic zone on the Fumba Peninsula in the southwest of Unguja Island, Zanzibar, a semi-autonomous state of the United Republic of Tanzania. The FEZ encompasses parts of Kombeni and Shakani Shehias, and all of Fumba, Dimani, and Nyamanzi Shehias; it is thus situated entirely within Maungani Ward. Fumba Town, Nyamanzi City, and Afcon City, in Dimani, Nyamanzi, and Dimani, respectively, are currently the FEZ's only urban developments aside from existing villages on the peninsula.

The Fumba FEZ was established by the Zanzibar Investment Promotion Agency (ZIPA) in 1992 in a move to attract foreign investors. Over time, this became an endeavor to increase residential development amid significant population growth in, and the consequent urban sprawl out of the Mjini (Stone Town) metropole. Growth in the area was initially stalled, with many blaming structural red tape. By the mid-2010s, though, Fumba Town had been established, and ground broken by CPS. Nyamanzi City did not begin development until the mid-2020s, This occurred at the same time as Fumba Town began to solidify as an urban agglomeration, with 700 units completed and multiple commercial districts established.

Transit campus of IIT Madras Zanzibar, ca. Oct 2026

The SEZs developments have been built with the intention of establishing Zanzibar as a primary tech hub in Africa and the wider Indian Ocean, and fulfilling the goals of Zanzibar's sustainable development roadmap. Fumba Town has been the site of several international trade and music festivals, and a masters program for the African School of Economics. The Indian Institute of Technology Madras Zanzibar Campus is located in FEZ. In 2027, the western end of the FEZ will serve as the staging location for Zanzibar's co-hosting of the Africa Cup of Nations, with the 'Afcon City' site currently under development; the government plans to transform it post-games into a sports complex and residential development. In 2028, it will become host to the Burj Zanzibar, a freestanding concrete core, timber-beam tower which, upon completion, will be the world's largest timber apartment structure. The Fumba Port, in Fumba shehia, on the southeastern coast of the Fumba Peninsula, is set to become Zanzibar's primary import hub upon the completion of a dredging and expansion announced in 2025.

== Background ==
After opening its economy to foreign investors, and forming ZIPA 6 years earlier, 3000 hectares of the Fumba region of Unguja were declared to be a Free Economic Zone (FEZ) in 1992 by the Zanzibari government. Little in the way of development was advanced for the next decade thereafter; gradual reforms over the course of the 2000s, 2010s, and early 2020s gave ZIPA additional administrative powers to act as an investment promotion authority. The agency used this to offer foreign investors incentives such as zero tax on worldwide net income for 10 years, and residency permits for ZIPA registered purchasers of a property valued at $100,000 or more, alongside their spouse and up to four children.

=== Developments ===
Waterfront of Fumba Town

Fumba Town was the first major property to be built within the Fumba FEZ. In 2012, talks began between community leaders, government representatives, and German engineering firm CPS Africa to develop the site. CPS ultimately proposed the development to ZIPA in 2015, whereafter it was allocated 149 acres and granted a 99 year lease on the property with "rental, sale, mortgage and inheritance rights". Local opposition initially prevented land acquisition, with representatives of CPS claiming that "it took us five years to get this land". During this period, local laws were amended to ease restrictions on development.

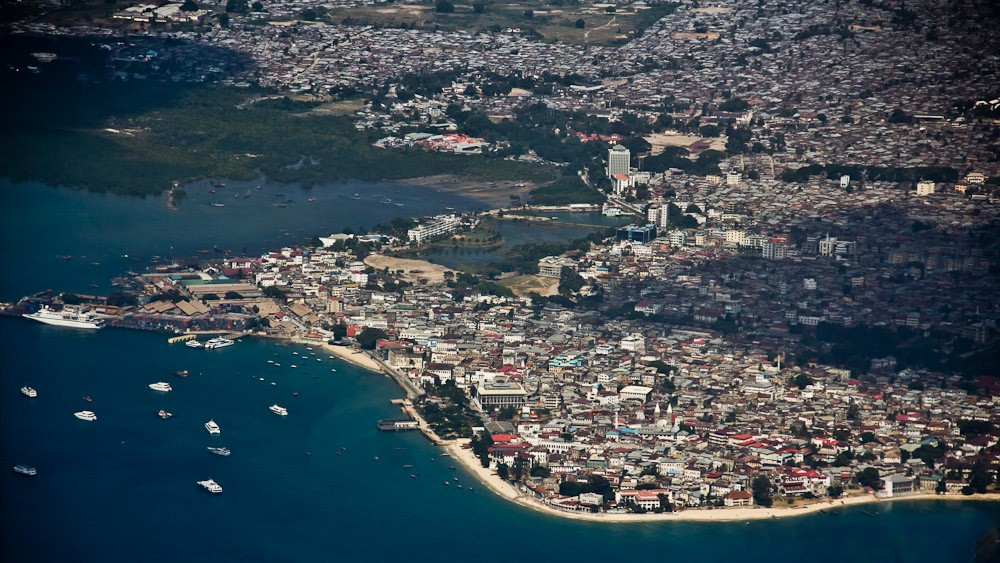
Aerial view of Stone Town, Zanzibar. Many of the Fumba FEZ's developments have been built with the intention of managing overflow from the city's progressive outward sprawl, which began close to the turn of the millennium

In August 2022, the Zanzibari government launched the Silicon Zanzibar initiative, which sought to attract tech companies to the FEZ through a streamlined work visa process. It is intended to help achieve Zanzibar's 'Blue Economy Policy', part of its development roadmap which seeks to "promote economic development with low environmental footprint and limited resource requirements". This is part of a larger goal to diversify Zanzibar's economy in the face of threats likely to face the islands' critical industries on account of climate change, including agriculture and tourism. The physical base of this operation was established in Fumba Town.

In May 2025, Mozambican President Daniel Chapo met with Zanzibari President Hussein Mwinyi to discuss the mutual exchange of knowledge and expertise on various sustainable development initiatives between his nation, Zanzibar, and Tanzania more broadly. His visit included a tour of the Fumba FEZ, from which he stated that he had learned a great deal, including that the Fumba FEZ and the port it contained served as promising investment opportunities. The two countries signed several resolutions and treatises during the state visit, including several agreements to increase mutual investment and joint ventures to support entrepreneurship and small-scale cross-border enterprise.

==== Nyamanzi City ====
In December 2023, blueprints for Nyamanzi City were delivered to President Mwinyi by the Minister of Trade and Industrial Development Omar Said Shaaban. The foundations were laid the same year. Initially, the project had been envisioned for Kilimani Shehia. This was ultimately changed on account of political concerns surrounding its location. It would have been situated on a strip bordering the dividing line between Stone Town and Ng'ambo. Up to this point, work on the project has largely been completed by South Korean-based firm Heerim Architects and Planners, though competition exists among developers for various contracts.

===== Zanzibar International Trade Fair =====
The 12th edition of the Zanzibar International Trade Fair opened at the Nyamanzi Exhibition Grounds in Nyamanzi on December 29 2025, lasting until January 16; the opening was officiated by 2nd Vice President of Zanzibar Hemed Suleiman Abdulla. The government intends for the trade expo to spur market development and improve links between regional producers and international export partners. Participants in the expo include government representatives, domestic merchants, and foreign firms. At the expo, the government announced a plan to register at least 150 development projects each year.

==== Afcon City ====
In late 2025, Zanzibari President Hussein Mwinyi announced that the Fumba EEZ would serve as home of Afcon City, a new stadium and residential development built to serve as one of the principal match sites for Tanzania's co-hosting of the 2027 Africa Cup of Nations. This came after the agreement of Tanzania and co-host nations Kenya and Uganda to build new stadiums in advance of the competition, having previously agreed to major improvements in pitch quality at existing stadiums on the mainland. It is expected to serve as the staging location for several pre-finals and semifinals matches.

The principal contract holder and lead developer of the project is Globespan Infrastructure. Stadium construction has thus far been primarily managed and performed by the Turkish firm Orkun Group, and design by Manchester-based firm AFL Architects. In March 2026, the Zanzibari government pledged an additional Sh388.8 billion (~$150 million) to complete the project ahead of the competition. By that time, the project was stated to have reached 35% completion. The development is "expected to feature modern training grounds, accommodation facilities, and other infrastructure aimed at enhancing the overall experience for participants and visitors alike". The stadium which will be used for 2027 Cup matches will sit at the complex's center, seating approximately 32,000 people. The project's developers have indicated that the complex will also include a 10,000 seat military parade ground; both the parade ground and Fumba stadium will become the largest such facilities of their kind in Zanzibar upon their respective completion.

Planned developments vary by source, thus no exact projection of the site's final infrastructure is available. According to StadiaWorld, two additional competition grounds are set to be built: a 10,000 seat football stadium, and a 2,500 seat dual-use football/athletics center. Construction Review indicates that development is set to occur in two phases. The first phase (projected to cost $260 million) is set to consist of the main stadium, which will feature convertible seating infrastructure that will allow the site to double as a concert venue and conference center, two 15,000 seat training pitches, a 150-key 5-star luxury hotel, and a specialized sports hospital for competing athletes and medical tourism. The second phase is projected at $185 million, and will feature the construction of an additional 150-key 4-star hotel, a 5,000 seat multipurpose indoor arena, a mixed-use commercial district, and a small-scale passenger port for visitor transport.

== Fumba Town ==
Fumba Town Mji wa Fumba (Swahili, unofficial) / Silicon Zanzibar
- Private, internationally owned residential and community development
- Fumba Town
- Interactive map of Fumba Town
- Initial proposal and negotiation with community leaders: 2012
- Ground broken: 2017
- First houses completed: 2018

Area
  - Total: 60 ha (149 acres)

Population
  - Estimate: 1,500

Fumba Town, also known as Silicon Zanzibar, is an urbanization initiative within the area of the Fumba Free Economic Zone. The development is a public-private partnership "led by the Zanzibar Ministry of Investment & Economic Development to attract African and global tech companies" and has been underway since 2014.

A few kilometers north of Fumba-proper, and roughly 15km south of Zanzibar International Airport, the project was envisioned and developed as a model city designed to manage residential overflow resulting from the growth of the Mjini metropole and the subsequent growth in international residents. It has been hailed by local observers as "a model for Africa's sustainable urban future", and by government-aligned publications as a "flagship example of how private investment and public policy can combine to shape greener, more inclusive African cities"; it has further been highlighted as a critical component of Zanzibar and Tanzania's Vision 2050 development roadmap. Design is currently managed by Berlin-based firm OMT Architects. The original design was provided by Dar es Salaam based architecture firm APC Architectural Pioneering Consultants.

=== Development and expansion ===
CPS has aimed to "[demonstrate] that sustainability, affordability, and modern design can coexist". They initially sought to provide a total of 3000 residential units, covering a 1.5km band of coastline over 149 acres. Construction began in 2017. The first houses were completed in 2018. By 2023, this was 700 units, half of those being permanent residences. Over 1000 units had been sold by that time, making it one of the fastest selling real estate developments in Tanzania. By late 2025, a hundred more had been completed, and the community counted over 1500 residents. CPS is now aiming to complete 5000 units by 2035.

On 30 August 2022, a new commercial pavilion was opened to "provide...services such as retail, offices, food and beverage, [and] medical and sports facilities". In September of that year, multiple development firms criticized Zanzibar's government for what they perceived to be an overly bureaucratic and insincere incentive delivery process, resulting in losses and the threat of revocation of their lease by Zanzibari authorities. This came on the heels of the revocation of Pennyroyal Company's land lease on the Blue Amber Resort development (led by the same investment team as had set Fumba Town in motion) northeast of Zanzibar City. A representative for CPS pointed to the slow pace of receipt of, and vacillating use guidelines for residential permits and title deeds as being major impediments to continued growth and investment in the region.

The Fumba Town development expanded markedly in 2023. In late February, representatives for CPS attended the EU-Tanzania Business Forum, calling upon Zanzibar's government to place a more intensive focus on streamlining the region's real estate policies and administrative framework, claiming that the industry could serve as a massive boon to the islands' economy. The company spoke at the September Africa Climate Summit as well. In June, the company announced The Soul Fumba project, a "dream holiday [apartment]" project encompassing 200 units on the western shoreline of the development. In November, the American non-profit Charter Cities Institute announced that it had signed an MOU with CPS Africa to support Fumba Town's expansion. This would involve the creation of a new campus for the African School of Economics in the community, which would serve as an anchor tenant to spur further development. The development's website states that the school has since run a first master's course at the complex. The Indian Institute of Technology Madras had opened its IITM Zanzibar Campus earlier that year. According to Deutsche Welle, more than 200 businesses have expressed interest in establishing themselves at Fumba Town. The company had purportedly already put $400 million into residential developments in the region by September of that year, according to Zanzibari Minister for Economy & Investment Mudrick Soraga. In December, Minister of Tourism and Heritage Simai Mohammed Said stated that CPS "ha[d] become a significant stakeholder in advertising [Zanzibar] in the tourism [circle] ...".

The complex currently encompasses 800 residential units as of 2025, with plans to develop basic and collegiate educational facilities, office spaces, basic amenity retail services, various auxiliary infrastructure aimed at sustainability, and a "European-standard" hospital. Additional augmentations include a "full-fledged hospitality and business district", more expansive affordable "smart" housing options, district-wide renewable energy infrastructure, a school, amphitheater, walking and jogging trails, and a corniche spanning the whole of the property's shoreline, all in an effort to produce improved "health, recreation, and mobility infrastructure to support a growing and increasingly diverse population".

The company projects that it will house 80,000 people on the property by 2050. It claimed to have sold 1400 homes by 2025.

==== Job creation ====
Fumba Town has been noted for its role in fueling job creation and skill acquisition in Zanzibar. It has purportedly contributed $60m to Tanzania's economy; the tenders and contracts it has provided to local construction companies and specialty trade groups has served as a boon for local employment, and as an opportunity for apprentices and trainees to get hands on experience in specialized roles, including as "engineers ... carpenters ... [and] solar technician[s]."

In February 2023, CPS established a STEM and engineering scholarship for female graduate interns "to provide a platform to nurture and empower female graduates to achieve higher female representation in the engineering industry". The program began with four recipients, one from Ardhi University, three from the University of Dar es Salaam. Graduates will work on site at the development, with opportunities to experiment within various technical disciplines and ultimately choose a specialty. The first student graduated in September 2023.

=== Sustainable infrastructure and development ===
The developers have stated that they "never treated sustainability as a marketing phrase", but rather "[their] starting point". This includes the use of mass timber as a substitute for sand, green infrastructure, walkable communities, and "renewable energy and independent water systems, including solar roofs, rainwater harvesting, and decentralized wastewater treatment". Steps have purportedly been taken to bring the community as close to the ideal of a circular economy as possible. Timber production will soon be localized upon the completion of the SuperTimber2000 factory in Zanzibar. The development maintains a permaculture landscape and, as of 2023, has achieved 94% waste recycling. In September of that year, CPS partnered with the Embassy of Sweden in Kenya and Gatsby Africa at the Africa Climate Summit to propose a means of significantly reducing the use of steel and concrete and maximizing carbon sequestration in housing construction through the use of timber; this was later described in an opinion by a reporter for The Citizen as "a groundbreaking approach to building sustainable, safe, and equitable homes that could transform the continent's urban landscape.

The project has been credited with helping to revive the Fumba Peninsula's nocturnal red colobus monkey population, which was decimated alongside the region's mangrove forests as a result of logging in the late 20th and early 21st centuries. This is aided by the development's hosting of 157 plant and tree species which, combined with a central water fountain, have helped to return local bird and insect populations as well.

==== Burj Zanzibar ====
A 96-meter timber tower known as the "Burj Zanzibar" has been under development at Fumba Town since 2022, and is expected to be completed between 2027 and 2028. It will operate under the banner of Canopy by Hilton, being Zanzibar's first such enterprise; it is the first structure of its kind on the African continent. The development was launched in Muscat, Oman, on 1 October 2025. The tower was originally set to consist of 266 units. That number has since been reported down as 162 units, largely consisting of luxury accommodations. Covering 28 stories, it will be constructed using "a steel-reinforced concrete core, with cross-laminated timber and glulam comprising other structural elements". The structure will include passive design elements aimed at enhancing sustainability, including "permanent sun shading provided by the facade to limit heat-gain on the inside, [and] the integration of roof gardens and planters."

Upon completion, it will be the world's tallest timber apartment structure. It will be constructed with the assistance of specialists from Switzerland, Austria, Germany, South Africa, Tanzania, and the United States. Unit prices will range from $79,000 to roughly $951,000.

Specifications
Typology	Mixed-use high-rise
Gross area	55.350 m^{2}
Net area	34.130 m^{2}
Accommodations	293 apartment-units / 180 keys
Cost	$57.4 million
Material	Hybrid engineered timber

=== Futopia ===
The first iteration of FuTopia, an urban festival organized by Busara Promotions showcasing "creativity, sustainability, and innovation" took place in Fumba Town from August 29 – 31 2025. It is an extension of the group's Sauti za Busara (Sw : 'Wise Voices') festival, which has been held annually in February for more than 22 years; Fumba Town has served as the festival's main sponsor since 2022. A portmanteau of "future" and "utopia", it was described by The Citizen as "aim[ing] to transform everyday spaces into vibrant cultural zones that bring together music, art, food, fashion, sports, and technology".

Morning events were primarily centered around cultural, civic, and community engagement; evening events were largely entertainment based, featuring musicians from across the African continent, among them "Bensoul ... Rosa Ree, Damian Soul, Wamoto Music, Humphrey Mubba, Warriors of the East, the all-female Uwaridi Band, Tryphon Evarist, and DJ KCM". Attendees traversed multiple "zones" concerning a variety of different cultural modes; topics ranged from international food to health, craftsmanship, sports, children's education, and the literary arts. The second iteration of the festival will take place in August 2026, with plans to be held annually moving forward.

=== Financials and major tenants ===
Home prices can range from roughly $40,000 to $381,000. A vast proportion of the development's clientele are foreign nationals, hailing from over 50 countries, chiefly among them Kenyans, Americans, and Omanis. The company's annual return on investment is estimated at 15% after tax. The company reports to have investors from over 60 nations as of 2025.

Beyond the Fumba Town development, CPS Africa's stakeholders and partners are also involved with the Paje Square project in Unguja's southeast, as well as the Blue Amber Resort project northeast of Stone Town. The development is home to offices for several prominent corporations, including Wasoko, recognized by the Financial Times as Africa's fastest growing company, which has moved more than 40 tech workers and several members of its senior leadership to the property. Wasoko later shut down its Zanzibar office and paused operations in Uganda and Zambia weeks before finalizing a merger with MaxAB. It had initially opened its Zanzibar office in 2022.

== Fumba Port ==
In late August 2025 the Zanzibari government announced an Sh1 trillion ($400 million) investment in regional port infrastructure. Among the projects announced was the expansion and deepening of Fumba Port, located east of the village, to serve as an import hub for the islands; upon completion, the dredging process would allow for the handling of 250,000 shipping containers annually. This would enable Zanzibar to reduce its reliance on port infrastructure at Dar es Salaam, Tanga, in mainland Tanzania and Mombasa, Kenya. This, in turn, would allow the country's industries and consumers to deal directly with buyers and suppliers abroad, principally China, Turkey, the United Arab Emirates, and the United Kingdom. The port's cargo balance sat at 5,239 containers received and 3,281 exported for the year by August of 2025. It is a Roll-on/Roll off berthing facility, spanning 1.74 hectares, and is listed by the Zanzibar Ports Corporation as "operated" as of February 2026.

== Commentary and criticism ==
=== Gentrification and community expulsion ===
Writing for The Citizen, Paul Owere praised new urban developments such as Fumba Town and Nyamanzi City, seeing them as "stepping stones in the transformation of Zanzibar into a dynamic business hub where the rhythm of commerce blends with the island's timeless allure". However, he pointed to concerns over the potential for such projects to displace locals and traditional ways of life in Zanzibar, posing a threat to Unguja's "unique identity". He worried that "pristine beaches might give way to concrete jungles, and the gentle sway of palm trees could be lost to the drone of traffic and construction." Nonetheless, he highlighted arguments from local businessmen that such projects represented a significant opportunity to attract investment and foster job creation.

Speaking to Deutsche Welle in 2023, locals expressed concerns over the affordability of Fumba Town's properties. The average Zanzibari national would have to work for 24 years simply to have earned a value equivalent to the community's minimum home price of $40,000. (Note: According to 2009 data from the Tanzanian government, the average individual income in Zanzibar was $4.47 per calendar day (Tsh6400), amounting to ~$1632 per year (Tsh2,336,000). In 2017, at the time of its ground breaking, a $40,000 unit at Fumba Town would be Tsh89,160,000. This would require 24.5 years of labor at the 2009 average national individual income level, in 2009 dollars, to match, or 24.8 years in 2017 dollars. In 2026 dollars, it is now equivalent in cost to Tsh102,600,000, requiring roughly the same amount of time to achieve (assuming a constant average individual income) from then to now. GDP per capita sat at $950 from 2019-20, up from $712 in 2009-10. Zanzibar's Lorenz curve shows the richest 20% of the population accounting for ~40%, and the bottom 20% of the population 8% of total consumption expenditure in 2009-10, with that ratio remaining relatively unchanged for the next decade thereafter. Though poverty rates have dropped considerably, by 2019-20, roughly 25% of the Zanzibari population still sat below the national poverty line of ~$348 (~Tsh800,000). Income inequality became "only slightly more unequal" over this period, according to the World Bank.)

=== Coastal degradation and environmental concerns ===
Coastal rock eroded by seawater

Fishermen in a dugout boat

The region encompassed by Fumba is existentially threatened by pollution, coastal construction, environmentally destructive fishing, and sand mining. Fumba is one of four shehias considered to be under the greatest threat from seawater encroachment in Magharibi-A District. Fumba and the whole of the Fumba FEZ's coastline are listed as part of the Menai Bay Conservation Area by the Zanzibari government, and as part of the Menai Bay important marine mammal area (IMMA) by the Marine Mammal Protected Areas Task Force (MMPATF).

Traditional crab fishing basket

Consequently, Nyamanzi and Kombeni shehias were also noted in that 2017 UNICEF report as two of the other shehias in Magharibi B District most at risk from seawater encroachment; thus, 3 of the four territories most threatened by seawater encroachment among the 18 shehias of Magharibi B District were within the Fumba Free Economic Zone. Simultaneously, the report listed pollution and construction taking place too close to the beach as contributing to environmental concerns in the region.

Tourism plays an outsize role in the economy of Zanzibar, though impacts on poverty reduction in the region have been mixed. The spread of tourist infrastructure along the island's coastline has had significant negative impacts on coastal ecosystems and communities. The loss of access to the sea which has come with the development of this infrastructure has led to a widespread loss of livelihood for fishermen in the region. In 2017, inhabitants of Fumba represented the district's second largest contingency of fishermen.

== See also ==
- Revolutionary Government of Zanzibar
- Adama Special Economic Zone
- Vision 2050 (Rwanda)
