= Uroa =

Coastal village in Tanzania

Coordinates: 6°06′S 39°25′E

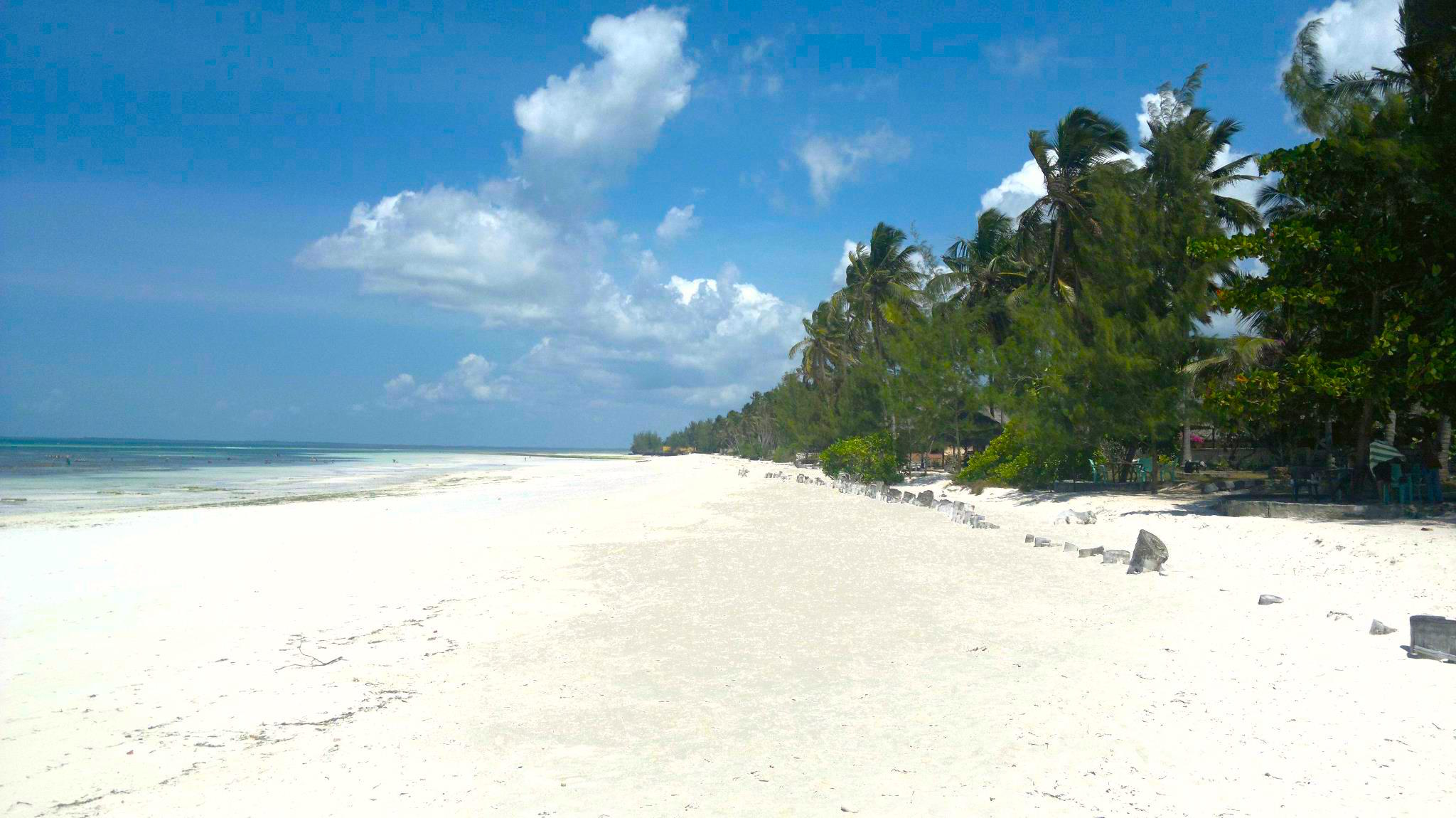
Uroa Beach.

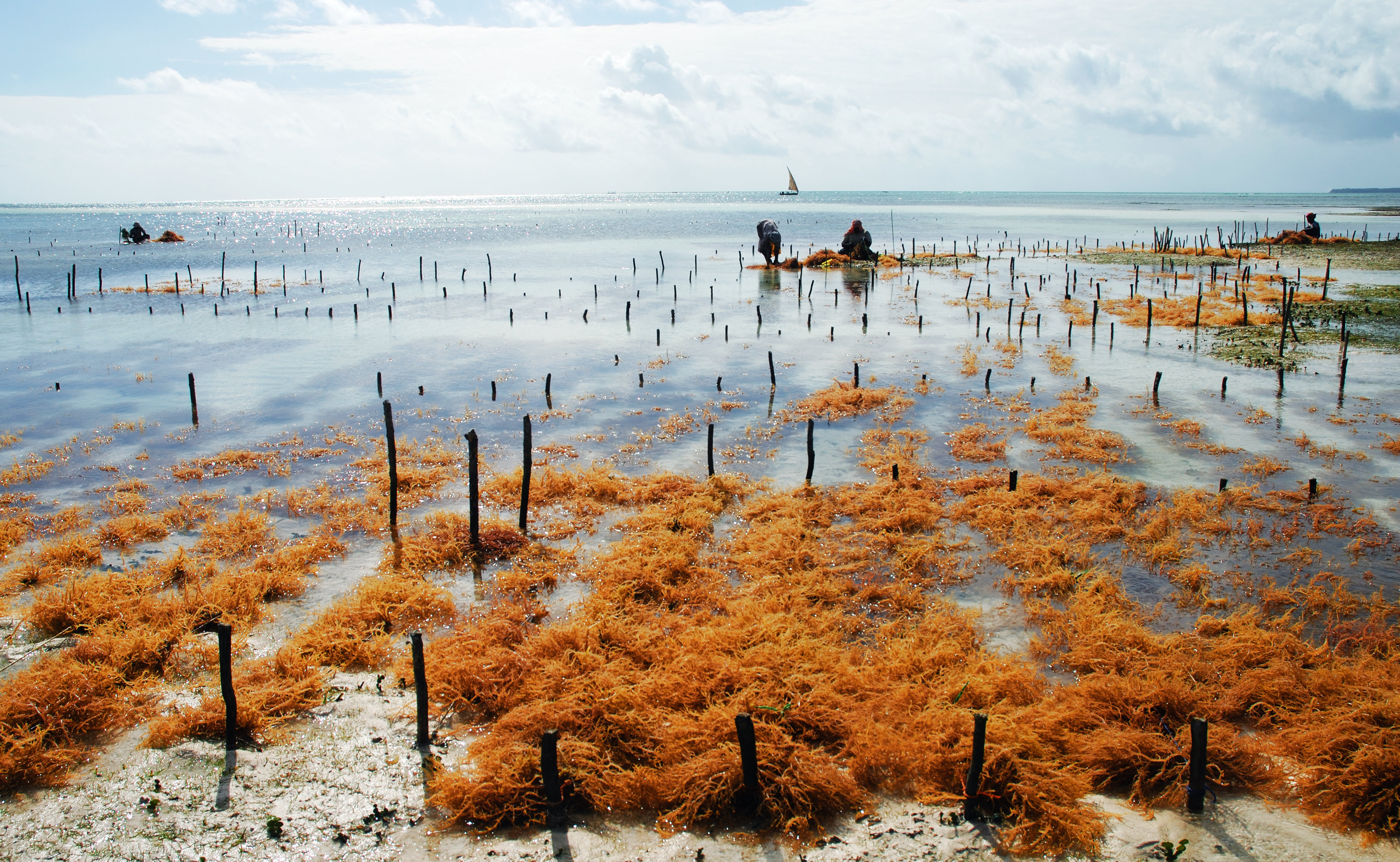
Seaweed farming in Uroa.

Uroa, sometimes spelled Urowa, is a small, rural coastal village on central eastern parts of Unguja (Zanzibar Island) in Tanzania. It is situated in the Chwaka Constituency in the Unguja South Region (Mkoa wa Unguja Kusini). It is located in the Uroa Bay, approximately halfway between the villages of Kiwengwa and Chwaka; 21.7 miles (34.9 km) north of Zanzibar Town. It is located 5.6 miles (9.0 km) north of Chwaka and 7.1 miles (11.4 km) south of Kiwengwa. Uroans mostly live on fishing and seaweed farming; tourism is also developing in the area, although to a lesser extent than on the south-eastern coast around Jambiani. It is a small and centerless village with resorts on the southern and northern side of its bay. It is home to only six stores and is recognized as a traditional, slow-paced, and spread-out village. Uroa Village stretches in a narrow, long line from south to north along the coastline, appropriately named Uroa Beach. The elevation of the town is only 3.2 feet (0.98 meters) on average. Its economy has traditionally relied on fishing and seaweed collecting, but has since 2008 experienced a growth in tourist accommodation. In addition, recent years have also seen an increase in governmental jobs such as health workers, administrators and teachers. New sources of income have contributed to an increased median income for Uroans, however, the income is fairly unequally distributed. For instance, the monthly income for seaweed farmers represent only U.S. $7 per farmer, while Uroans working in the tourist industry makes U.S. $65 on average per month.

Uroa can easily be reached by transportation such as dala-dala, public buses, minibuses, and taxis. Dala-dala number 214 goes between Stone Town in Zanzibar Town to Uroa Village six times per day, between 6 AM and 6 PM, whilst the public bus on route 13 goes eleven times per day from 8 AM to 4 PM. Public bus number 14 also goes to Uroa via Chwaka, and the trip usually costs between U.S. $3 and U.S. $5 per person each way. Dala-dala 214 sometimes runs from the Darajani Market in Stone Town, but usually goes from a junction known as Mwembeladu. Alternatively, public bus number 206 sometimes continues as far north as Uroa.
