= Tumbatu =

National Historic Site of Tanzania

Tumbatu Island Historic Sites
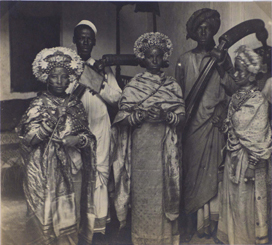
- Swahili women in Zanzibar late 19th Century CE

- Location within Tanzania
- 5.81861°S 39.2231°E
- Type: Settlement
- Cultures: Swahili
- Location: Kaskazini A District, Unguja North Region, Tanzania

Site notes
- Material: Coral rag
- Architectural styles: Swahili & Islamic
- Owner: Tanzanian Government
- Management: Antiquities Division, Ministry of Natural Resources and Tourism

National Historic Sites of Tanzania
- Official name: Tambatu Island Historic Sites
- Type: Cultural

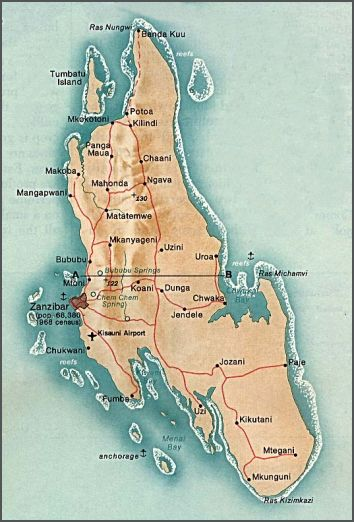
Map of the Zanzibar Archipelago including Tumbatu Island

Tumbatu (eneo la kale wa Tumbatu in Swahili) is a historic Swahili settlement located on Tumbatu Island, Kaskazini A District of Unguja North Region in Tanzania. This site is a significant archaeological site that contains a large number of collapsed coral stone structures including private houses and several mosques, the largest of which is located on the shore facing the village of Mkokotoni on Unguja. Pearce initially looked into the ruins in 1915 and wrote about the mosques, palace, and other stone homes.

The site has been investigated by Mark Horton and Catherine Clark in the 1980s and 1990s and by Henriette Rødland in 2017 and 2019. It was inhabited between the 12th and 15th centuries CE, a time of expansion and growth for many Swahili sites along the East African coast. The first known Swahili or proto-Swahili sites are dated to the 6th and 7th centuries, and some of the earliest Swahili settlements can be found on Zanzibar at places such as Unguja Ukuu and Fukuchani. These were African fishing and farming communities who traded with each other as well as inland East African communities and the wider Indian Ocean world, and who started their conversion to Islam in the 8th century, to which the earliest mosque has been dated.

Larger towns such as Tumbatu developed as a result of this extensive trade in the early second millennium CE, and archaeological investigations have uncovered large amounts of imported ceramics and glass beads at the site, attesting to the extensive trade networks existing between African urban areas and other Indian Ocean ports. Various local production activities also took place within Tumbatu, such as iron and pottery production, and spinning. There are currently no other known archaeological sites on the island, although some older structures of unknown date are known within the village of Jongowe. Tumbatu likely had a strong relationship with neighbouring Mkokotoni, which is easily accessible by boat.

== Geography ==
It is the third-largest island making up the Zanzibar Archipelago, part of Tanzania in East Africa. The island is located off the north-west coast of Zanzibar's main island, also known as Unguja. The wedge-shaped island is 8 kilometres (5.0 mi) long but only 2 kilometres (1.2 mi) wide at its widest point (in the south). It is surrounded by a reef, making it somewhat isolated from the rest of Zanzibar, even though its southern shore is only 2 kilometres (1.2 mi) from Mkokotoni on Unguja Island. The island has two villages, Jongowe in the south and Gomani further north. There are no roads or cars on the island, although people travel frequently by boat between the villages and to Unguja.

Historically, the island is of interest. Islanders who belong to the Shirazi ethnic group claim descent from Persian royalty that reputedly arrived in the ninth century. These kinds of oral traditions are common along the entire Swahili coast, and may be reflective of more recent colonial and post-colonial developments in East Africa, which emphasised race and tribal difference, as more recent archaeological and linguistic evidence indicates local African origin for the Swahili culture and settlements.

The late medieval city (13th century) was described in a chronicle known as the "Tumbatu Manuscript". This unique manuscript was apparently burned in a big fire in the village circa 1938. Nevertheless, it inspired Dutch maritime anthropologist and ethnohistorian A. H. J. Prins to visit the island by dhow from Zanzibar and identify the ancient Shirazi port city's ruins in June 1957.
