= Mangapwani Lighthouse =

- Location: Unguja; Zanzibar Archipelago; Tanzania
- Coordinates: 5°57′20.4″S 39°10′55.8″E

Tower
- Constructed: 1886 (first)
- Construction: stone tower
- Height: 23 metres (75 ft)
- Shape: square tower with balcony and lantern
- Markings: white and black horizontal bands
- Operator: Zanzibar Ports Corporation

Light
- First lit: 1926 (current)
- Focal height: 35 metres (115 ft)
- Range: 9 nautical miles (17 km; 10 mi)
- Characteristic: Fl W 15s.

The Mangapwani Lighthouse is located in Bumbwini, Zanzibar, Tanzania. The lighthouse is one of the oldest lighthouses on the island and is a square stone tower, painted with black and white horizontal bands. The lighthouse is near the Mangapwani slave caves, which were built after the slave trade was abolished in 1873. According to a July 2008 article in Lighthouse Digest, the lighthouse is area is abandoned and stripped by vandals.

== See also ==
- List of lighthouses in Tanzania
