= Jendele =

Village in Zanzibar, Tanzania

Coordinates: 6°10′S 39°22′E

Jendele is a village on the Tanzanian island of Unguja, part of Zanzibar. It is in the centre of the island, on the main route between Zanzibar City and Chwaka, to the north of the Jozani-Chwaka Bay National Park.
