= Jozani =

- Village
- Jozani within Tanzania
- Coordinates: 6°16′S 39°25′E
- Country: Tanzania
- Region: Zanzibar Central/South Region

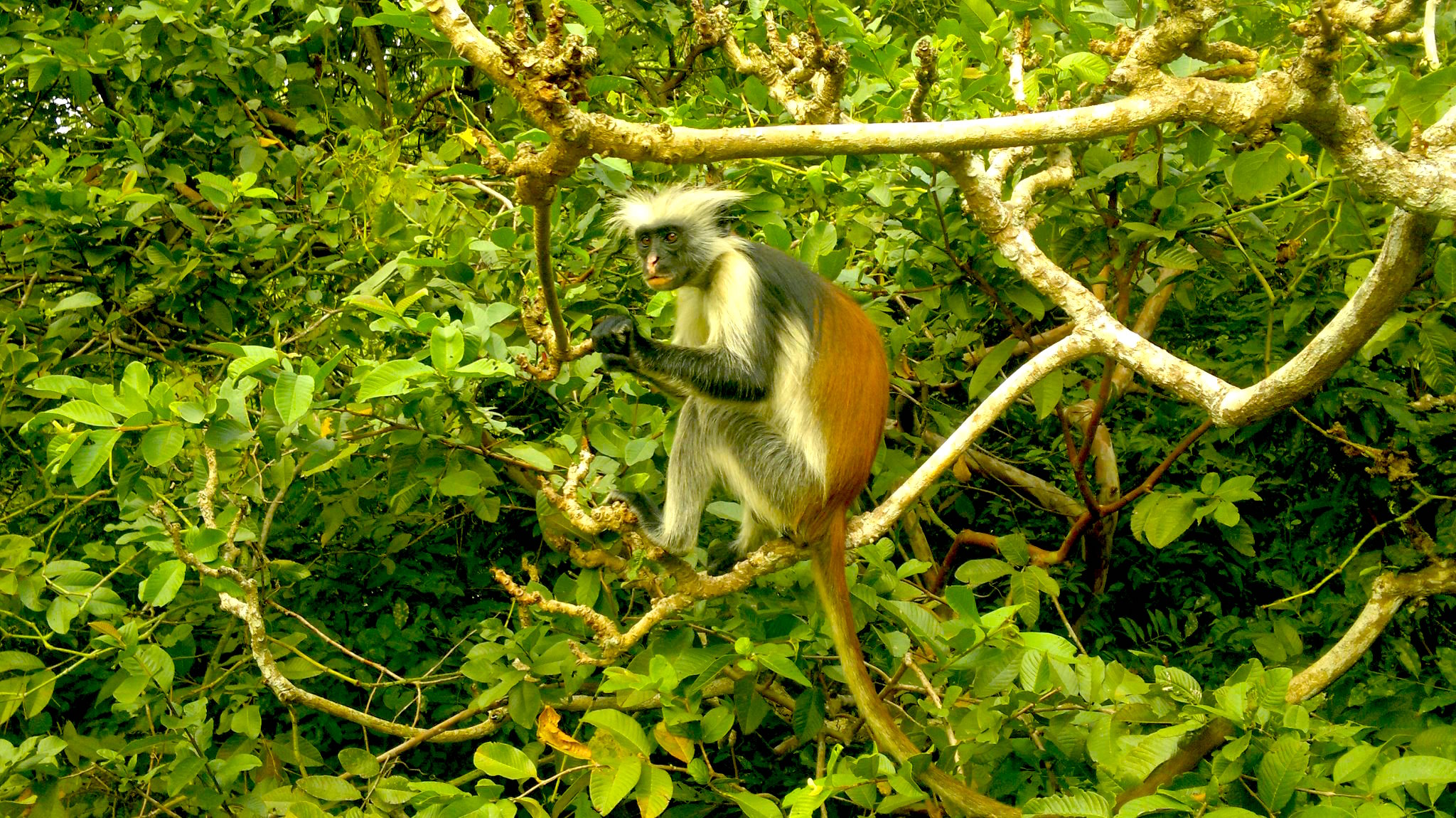
Jozani is situated immediately south of Jozani Chwaka Bay National Park, and is home to rare (but easily seen) Zanzibar red colobus.

Jozani is a village located in Kusini District of Unguja South Region of the Tanzanian island of Unguja (Zanzibar Island). It is located in the southeast of the island, 3.1 miles (5 km) south of Chwaka Bay, close to the edge of the Jozani-Chwaka Bay National Park. It is primarily a farming community of about 800 people. located 21.7 miles (35 km) south-east of Zanzibar Town off the road leading to Paje, Zanzibar. It is easily reached by public buses 309 and 310, by chartered taxi or as an organized tour from Zanzibar Town. These tours are often in combination with dolphin observation in Kizimkazi, one of Zanzibar's oldest settlements with a tiny 12th century mosque open to public. The main road on the island, connecting the west and east coasts of Zanzibar, also connects to Jozani. Besides public bus routes 9, 10 and 13, you can also get here from Zanzibar Town by dala-dala number 309, 310, 324, and 326. Jozani is a small and rural village, situated in the innermost part of the Pete Inlet Bay, just south of Jozani Chwaka Bay National Park. It is one of six rural villages surrounding the park. Residents rely heavily on the Jozani Forest for firewood, hunting, building resources, farming, fishing, and more. The village also manages ecotourism activities in the Jozani Forest and has constructed a 0.6 mile (1 km) boardwalk through the mangroves at the southern road entrance into the national park. Many villagers work as authorized guides for tours in the southern tip of the Jozani Forest.
