= Bondeni =

Ward in Tanzania

Bondeni Fuoni Kibondeni
- Ward
- Location within Tanzania
- Coordinates: 6.207602°S 39.269059°E
- Country: Tanzania
- Region: Mjini Magharibi Region
- District: Magharibi District
- Ward: Fuoni Kibondeni
- Established: 1984

Government
  - Type: Council

Area
  - Total: 24.08 km^{2} (9.30 sq mi)
- Elevation: 18 m (59 ft)

Population (2016)
  - Total: 15,400
  - Density: 640/km^{2} (1,660/sq mi)
- Time zone: EAT
- Postcode: 71xxx
- Area code: 024
- Website: zzzz District Website

Fuoni Kibondeni is a village on the Tanzanian island of Unguja, part of Zanzibar. It is located on the central west coast of the island, 18 kilometres north of the capital Zanzibar City. The ward covers an area of 24.08 square kilometres (9.30 sq mi) with an average elevation of 18 metres (59 ft).

In 2016 reports there were 15,400 people in the ward in 2012. The ward has 640 inhabitants per square kilometre (1,700/sq mi).
