= Kibweni =

Village in Zanzibar, Tanzania

Coordinates: 6°07′S 39°13′E

Kibweni is a village on the Tanzanian island of Unguja, part of Zanzibar in the continent of Africa. It is located on the west coast, five kilometres to the north of the capital, Zanzibar City, on the road to Bububu and Chuini.
