= Kitogani =

Village in Zanzibar, Tanzania

Coordinates: 6°17′S 39°26′E

Kitogani is a village on the Tanzanian island of Unguja, part of Zanzibar in the continent of Africa. It is located in the southeast of the island, two kilometres south of Jozani.
