= Nungwi =

Village in Zanzibar, Tanzania

Coordinates: 5.726°S 39.296°E

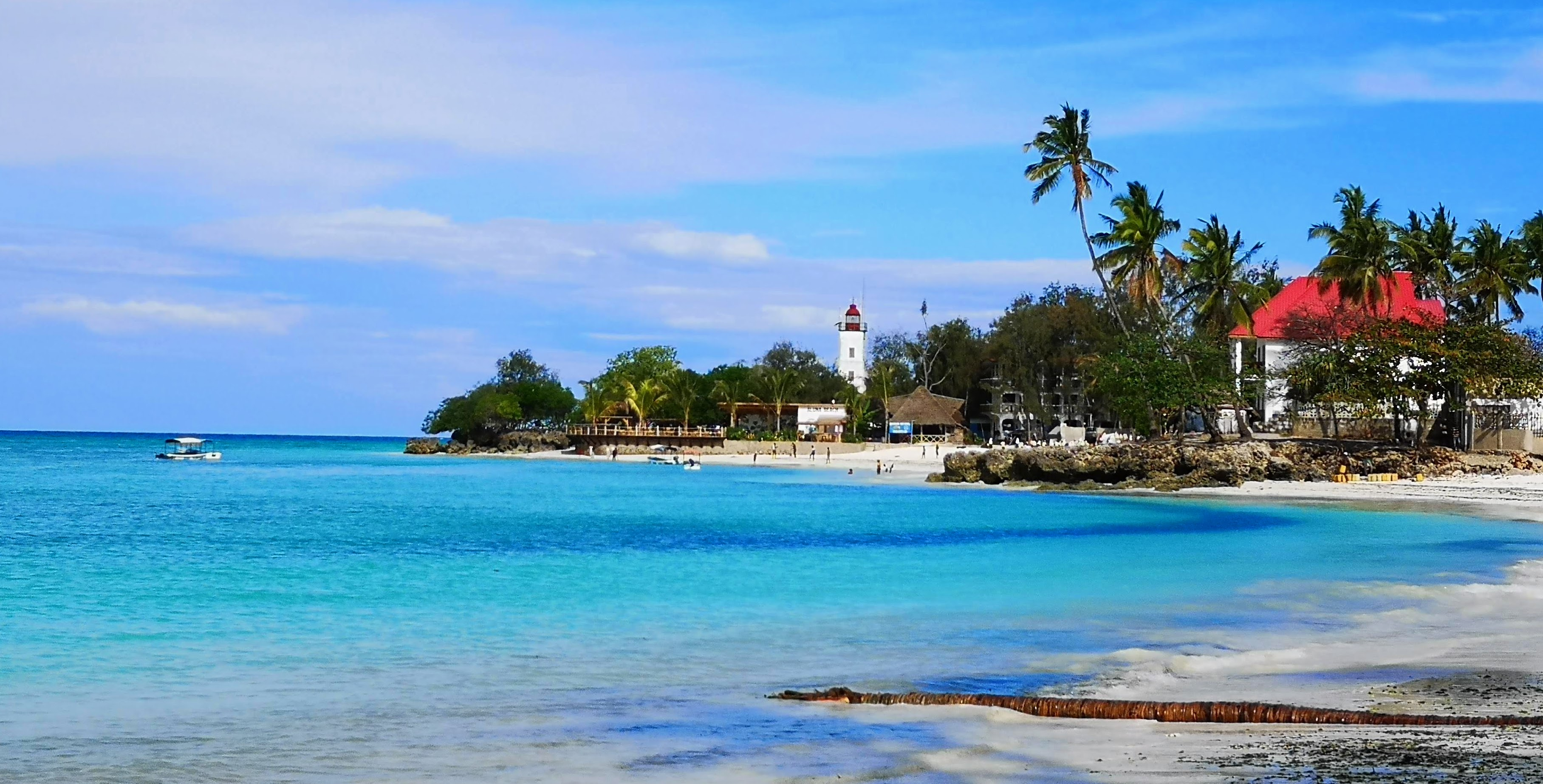
lighthouse nungwi

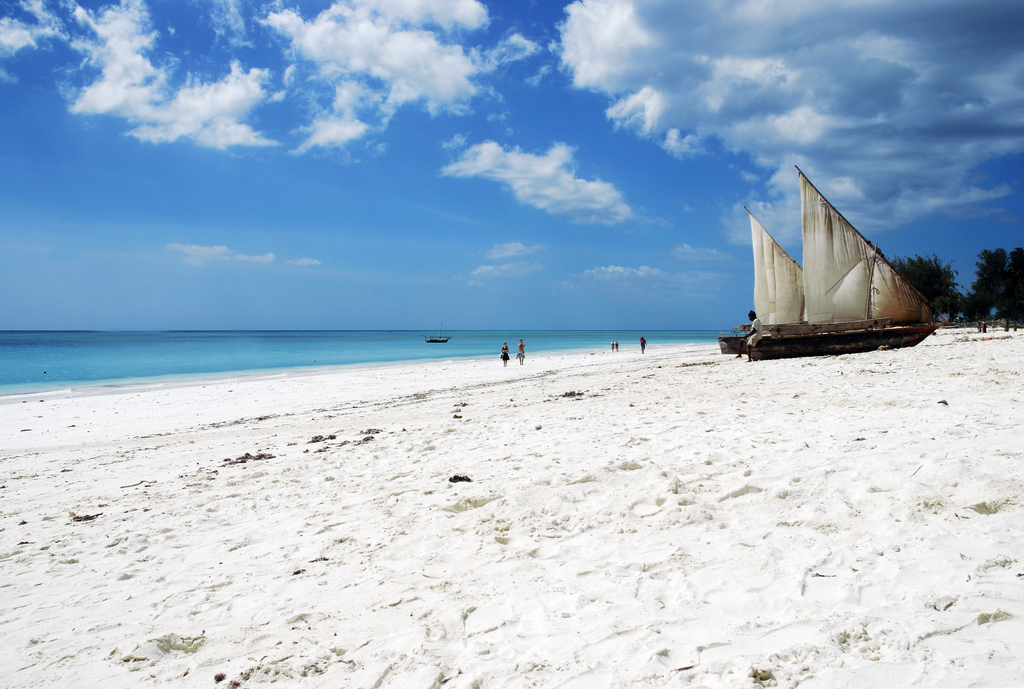
View of the main beach.

Nungwi, or Ras Nungwi, is a large village located in the far northern end of the island of Zanzibar. With a population of 30,762 (2022 census), Nungwi is the second largest settlement on the island. It is situated in the Nungwi Ward in the Kaskazini A District of the Unguja North Region. It is about 35 miles (56 km) north of Zanzibar Town on the Nungwi Peninsula, about an hour drive from Stone Town. To the south Nungwi shares a border with the neighboring Matemwe and Tazari villages. Nungwi was traditionally a fishing village and dhow-building center, but is now a popular tourist destination, and for instance recognized in CNN’s list of "100 best beaches of the world" in 2014. West Nungwi has changed a lot since the 1990s and is now a popular tourist destination with numerous resorts, restaurants, bars, stores, etc. East Nungwi is quieter and generally more laid-back.

Nungwi can be reached by public bus, dala-dala or a hired vehicle from Zanzibar Town. From Zanzibar Town the main tarmac road goes through the villages Mtoni, Mahonda, Kinyasini and Kivunge. It costs about TSh 2,000/=. Dala-dala number 116 leaves daily from Creek Road in Zanzibar Town for Nungwi every half-hour between 5:30 AM and 9 PM. Public bus on route 14 departs also every half-hour between 7 AM and 6 PM from the Darajani Terminal, Zanzibar Town.

== Economy ==
In the past it was mostly known as a dhow boatyard and fishing village. Until the 1990s, the local population was opposed to tourism. Nungwi's beach was one of the last in the area to host hotels and other tourist structures; however, in recent years, it has emerged as the most visited tourist destination in Zanzibar. Between 2008 and 2013, hotel capacity increased by 129 percent to roughly 1,000 rooms. The recent increase in tourism has been due to its coast and beaches lined with palm, mangrove, and casuarina trees, as well as the good snorkeling and scuba diving. The main beach of Nungwi is nicknamed "Jambo Square". A small aquarium with sea turtles has also recently been created in the village. Besides tourism and fishing, agriculture constitutes a smaller portion of the economic activity. Farmers cultivate lentils, corn, beans, and cassava.

== See also ==
Historic Swahili Settlements
