= Fumba =

Town on Zanzibar Island, Tanzania

Coordinates: 6°18′59.0394″S 39°17′5.64″E

- Shehia
- The Fumba Peninsula as shown in the south of Magharibi B District
- Interactive map of Fumba
- Country: Tanzania
- Region: Unguja South
- District: Magharibi B District

Population
  - Estimate (2017): 981
- Time zone: UTC+3 (East Africa Time)

Fumba is a village and shehia on the Tanzanian island of Unguja, part of Zanzibar. It is located within the Fumba Free Economic Zone, a special economic zone encompassing the territory of the Fumba Peninsula established by the Zanzibari government to promote international trade and investment. The shehia's eastern shoreline is home to Fumba Port which, upon its completed expansion, will serve as Zanzibar's primary import hub.

== Geography ==
Fumba village is located in the southwest of the island, at the end of the Fumba Peninsula, roughly 20 km (12 mi) south of Zanzibar International Airport. It overlooks Menai Bay in Mjini Magharibi Region. It is served by the Fumba Polisi – Dimani Dambani, Dimani Sokoni-Fumba Polisi, and Fumba Polisi-Fumba Beach roads.

== Demographics ==
As of 2017, according to information published as part of a joint UNICEF-Zanzibari government district profiling effort, the population of Fumba was 981, of whom 492 were male, and 489 female. 1.1% of the population was above the age of 60. There were 414 homes (of which roughly one-fifth were connected to water) composed of 232 households (of whom 59% had connection to electricity), with an average household occupancy of 4.2 persons.

== Economy and environment ==
The village's economy is largely based around subsistence agriculture. UNICEF's 2017 district profile documented 52 registered traders in the village. Fumba's villagers are part of a district farmers' group to organize banana production. Staple crops include cassava, bananas, and cabbage, though other produce is grown.

Primary agricultural products (metric tons, 2017)
Bananas	30
Viazi Vidogo (Potatoes)	14
Cassava	12
Viazi Vikuu (Yams)	11
Peas	5

From 2008-2014, and from 2016-2017, the shehia was supported by the Agriculture Sector Support Programme (ASSP). For the same period with the addition of 2015, it was supported by the Agriculture Sector Development Programme for Livestock (ASDPL). A women's seaweed harvesting collective known as Pania Uchupe, roughly translated from Swahili as "Let's work hard together to succeed" has met modest success in the village and in the global marketplace. Since 2021, it has supplied a factory in Kerege, Dar es Salaam, known as SeaWeed Café.

=== Fumba Port ===
In late August 2025 the Zanzibari government announced an Sh1 trillion ($400 million) investment in regional port infrastructure. Among the projects announced was the expansion and deepening of Fumba Port, located east of the village, to serve as an import hub for the islands; upon completion, the dredging process would allow for the handling of 250,000 shipping containers annually. This would enable Zanzibar to reduce its reliance on port infrastructure at Dar es Salaam, Tanga, in mainland Tanzania and Mombasa, Kenya. This, in turn, would allow the country's industries and consumers to deal directly with buyers and suppliers abroad, principally China, Turkey, the United Arab Emirates, and the United Kingdom. The port's cargo balance sat at 5,239 containers received and 3,281 exported for the year by August of 2025. It is a Roll-on/Roll off berthing facility, spanning 1.74 hectares, and is listed by the Zanzibar Ports Corporation as "operated" as of February 2026.

=== Fumba Town and the Fumba SEZ ===
Since 2014, a new-town development named Fumba Town has been underway in the center of the Fumba Free Economic Zone, a few kilometers north of Fumba-proper. Its design aims to provide a total of 3000 residential units, covering a 1.25km band of coastline over 149 acres.

=== Threats and conservation ===
Coastal rock eroded by seawater

Fishermen in a dugout boat

The region encompassed by Fumba is existentially threatened by pollution, coastal construction, environmentally destructive fishing, and sand mining. Fumba is one of four shehias considered to be under the greatest threat from seawater encroachment in Magharibi-A District. Fumba and the whole of the Fumba FEZ's coastline are listed as part of the Menai Bay Conservation Area by the Zanzibari government, and as part of the Menai Bay important marine mammal area (IMMA) by the Marine Mammal Protected Areas Task Force (MMPATF).

==== Coastal degradation ====
Tourism plays an outsize role in the economy of Zanzibar, though impacts on poverty reduction in the region have been mixed. The spread of tourist infrastructure along the island's coastline has had significant negative impacts on coastal ecosystems and communities. The loss of access to the sea which has come with the development of this infrastructure has led to a widespread loss of livelihood for fishermen in the region. In 2017, inhabitants of Fumba represented the district's second largest contingency of fishermen.

== Health and education ==
Fumba's main educational center is Bwefum school, which hosts pre-primary, primary, and secondary schooling services. As of 2017, there were 1120 students and 28 teachers; the schools' pupil – teacher ratios were 43, 24, and 22 respectively. The village is mainly serviced by Bwefum hospital, which is publicly owned.

== Politics and administration ==
Fumba falls within Maungani Ward of Dimani Constituency in Magharibi-A District. Rural council members are elected from the village to a local council and ward council, which represent them at the district level. As of 2026 it is represented in the Zanzibar House of Representatives by Mwanaasha Khamis Juma. As of 2022, the village was represented in the Tanzanian National Assembly by Mustafa Mwinyikondo Rajab.
