= Fukuchani =

- Village
- Location within Tanzania
- Coordinates: 5.829°S 39.2971°E
- Country: Tanzania

Population (2012)
  - Total: 2,208
  - Density: 267.1/km^{2} (692/sq mi)
- Time zone: EAT

Fukuchani is a village on the Tanzanian island of Unguja, part of Zanzibar. It is located on the northwest coast of the island, between Kibaoni and Kendwa. As of 2012 census, the village had a population of 2,208 people, with a population density of 267.1 inhabitants per square kilometre (692/sq mi).

The village is a popular spot for tourists and is also home to the Fukuchani Ruins. The Fukuchani Ruins are near the edge of the village and are the remains of a 16th-century coral rag house. The ruins date to the 16th century, but it is thought that there was a Shirazi settlement located here before and the remaining structure was constructed by the Portuguese. The ruins are known to locals as the "Portuguese House". The house had pointed stone arches and appeared to be fortified domestic dwelling, with gun slits in the walls of the gatehouse.
