= Chwaka Bay =

Bay of the Tanzanian island of Unguja

- Location in Tanzania
- Coordinates: 6°10′S 39°28′E
- Ocean/sea sources: Indian Ocean
- Basin countries: Tanzania
- Max. length: 7.6 km (4.7 mi)
- Max. width: 6.8 km (4.2 mi)
- Islands: Several
- Settlements: Chwaka and Kae

Chwaka Bay is a large indentation in the central east coast of the Tanzanian island of Unguja - the largest island of the Zanzibar Archipelago. The bay contains several small islands, and the towns of Chwaka and Kae are situated on its coast.

The southwest corner of the bay forms part of the Jozani Chwaka Bay National Park.
