= Zanzibar servaline genet =

Scientific classification
- Kingdom: Animalia
- Phylum: Chordata
- Class: Mammalia
- Order: Carnivora
- Family: Viverridae
- Genus: Genetta
- Species: G. servalina
- Subspecies: G. s. archeri

Trinomial name
- Genetta servalina archeri Van Rompaey & Colyn, 1998

Subspecies of carnivore

The Zanzibar servaline genet (Genetta servalina archeri) is a subspecies of servaline genet endemic to Unguja Island in the Tanzanian archipelago of Zanzibar. Its conservation status is uncertain.

== Evolutionary history ==
The closest known relative of the Zanzibar servaline genet is Lowe's servaline genet, G. s. lowei, a subspecies which is found in the Eastern Arc Mountains of mainland Tanzania. These two animals have presumably been evolving independently since at least the end of the last ice age, when Unguja was separated from continental Africa by rising sea levels. The survival of the servaline genet on the island parallels that of the endemic Zanzibar leopard, and the Zanzibar red colobus.

== Discovery and description ==
Although the servaline was known to rural Zanzibaris, zoologists remained unaware of its existence until the last decade of the 20th century. In 1995 Tony Archer, a wildlife consultant working in Zanzibar, acquired a dried skin and skull in the village of Kitogani, in south-central Unguja. This specimen was subsequently described as a new subspecies of servaline genet (G. s. archeri), named in honour of Archer.

In January 2003 live Zanzibar servaline genets were photographed for the first time in nearby Jozani-Chwaka Bay National Park. Camera traps yielded pictures of servalines at four locations, two in groundwater forest in the heart of the park and two in dry scrub to the north-east. These photographs provided new information about the distribution of the genet and its physical characteristics.
