= Mahonda =

Village in Zanzibar, Tanzania

Coordinates: 6.4500°S 39.4667°E

Mahonda is a village on the Tanzanian island of Unguja, part of Zanzibar. It is located in the northeast of the island, seven kilometres to the west of Kinyasini and 20 kilometres northeast of the capital, Zanzibar City.
