= Paje, Zanzibar =

Village in Zanzibar, Tanzania

Coordinates: 6°15′59.47″S 39°32′1.71″E

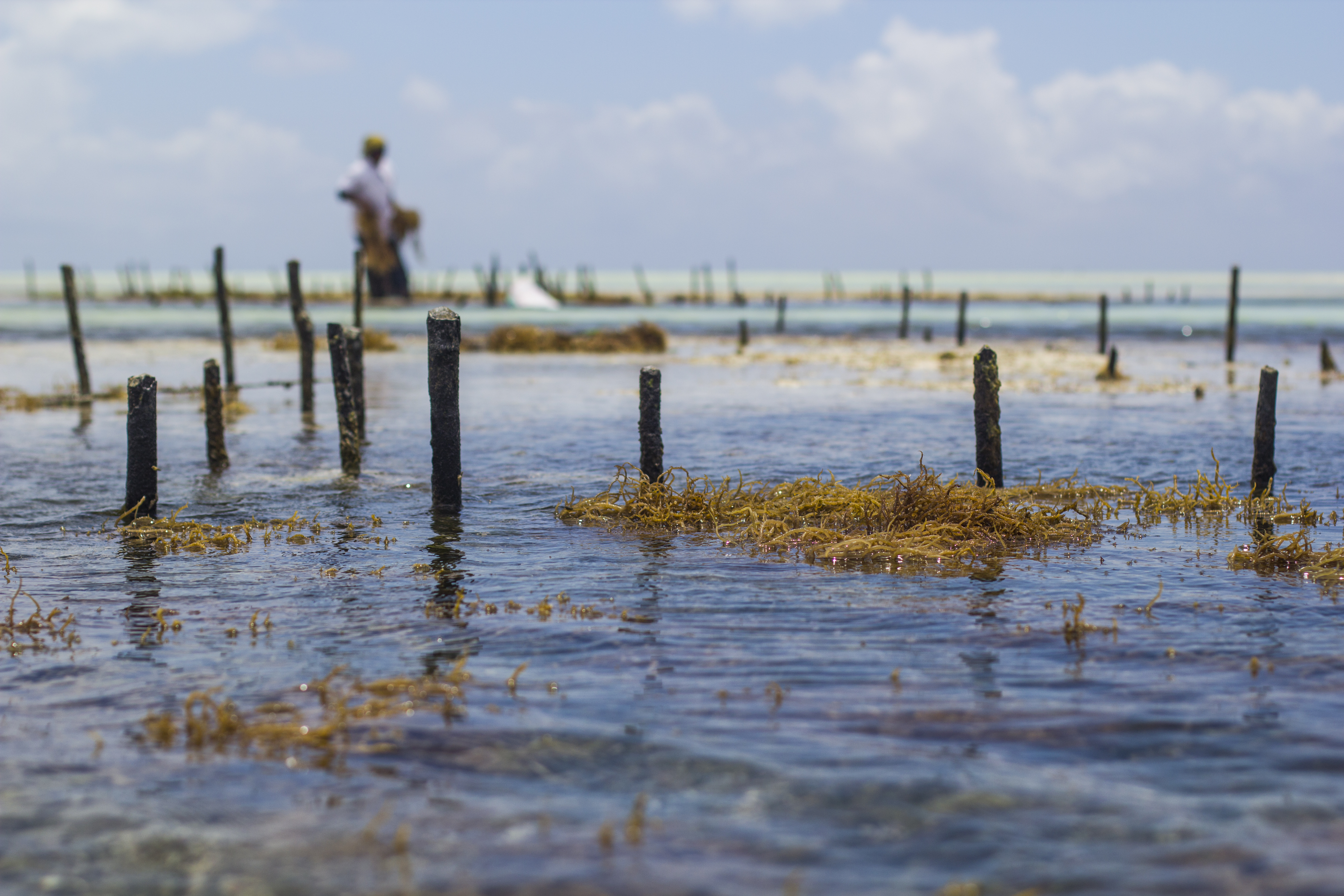
Seaweed gathering in Paje

Paje is a village on the Tanzanian island of Unguja, part of Zanzibar. It is located on the southeast coast between the villages of Bwejuu and Jambiani.

The lagoon is popular for learning kiteboarding, as it offers consistently side-onshore winds for most of the year, remains shallow with a sandy bottom during low tide, and is sheltered from waves by an offshore reef.
