= Kae, Zanzibar =

Beach in Zanzibar, Tanzania

Coordinates: 6.141°S 39.493°E

Kae is not a separate village, but rather the beach area of Michamvi, a village on the Tanzanian island of Unguja, part of Zanzibar. It is one of the two settlements located on the east of the island at the northern tip of the Michamvi Peninsula. The beach lies on the shore of Chwaka Bay, directly to the west of the village of Pingwe.
