= Fuoni =

Village in Zanzibar, Tanzania

Coordinates: 6°11′S 39°15′E

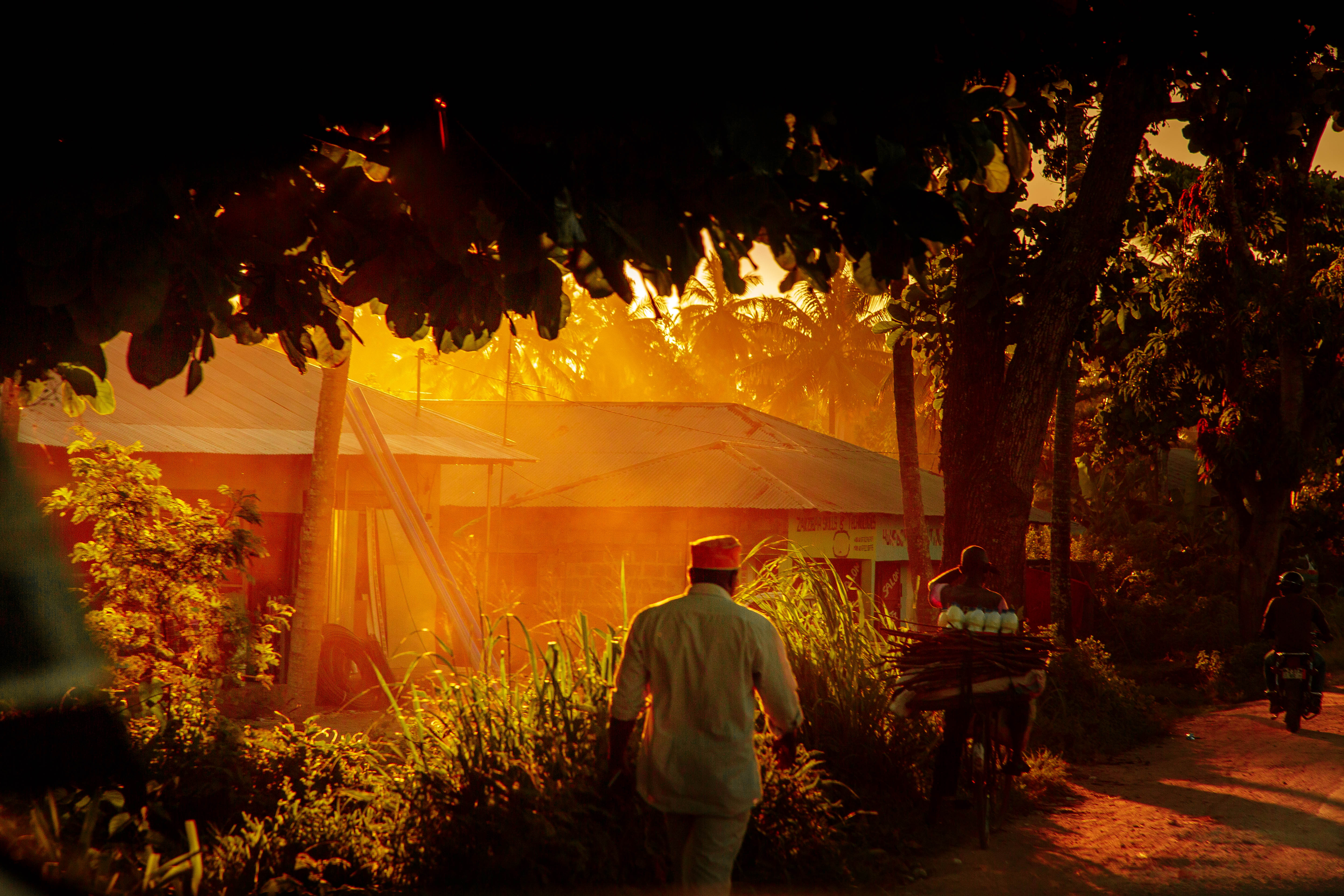
Sunset in Fuoni

Fuoni is a village on the Tanzanian island of Unguja, part of Zanzibar. It is located five kilometres to the southeast of Zanzibar City, immediately to the east of the village of Mwana Kwerekwe.

Several Daladalas (small local busses) with the number 504 are transferring from the Darajani to Fuoni.
