= Pingwe =

Village in Zanzibar, Tanzania

Coordinates: 6°09′S 39°31′E

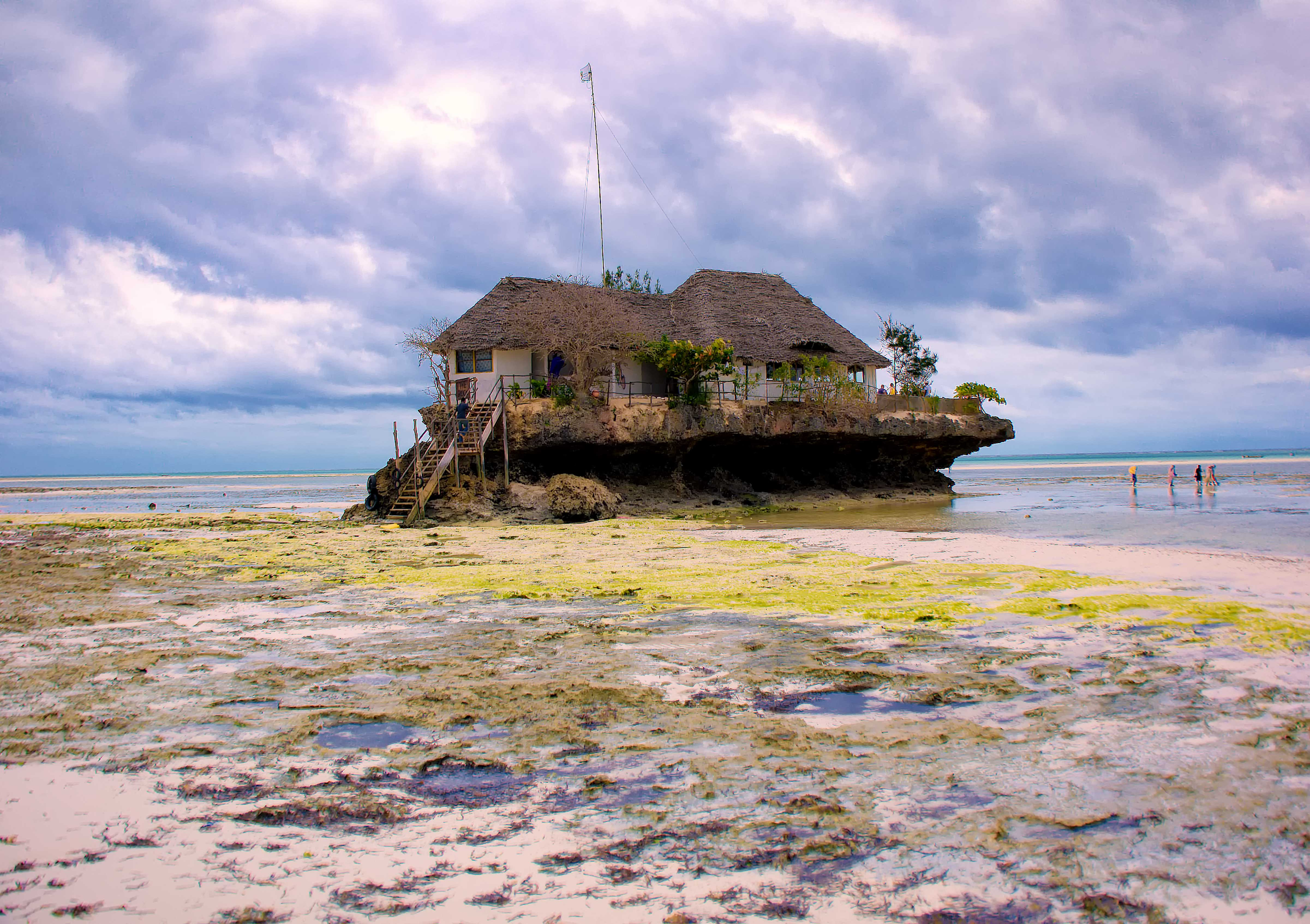
The Pingwe beach with The Rock

Pingwe is a village on the Tanzanian island of Unguja, which is part of Zanzibar. It is one of two villages located in the east of the island at the northern tip of Michamvi Peninsula. It lies immediately to the east of the village of Kae. In 2018, Pingwe Beach was named one of the world's best beaches in the "Special Ambience" category, according to Beach-Inspector.com. The beach's restaurant, called The Rock and situated on a massive rock only connected to the beach at low tide, has been called "painfully postcard-perfect."
