= Bwejuu =

Village in Tanzania

- Village
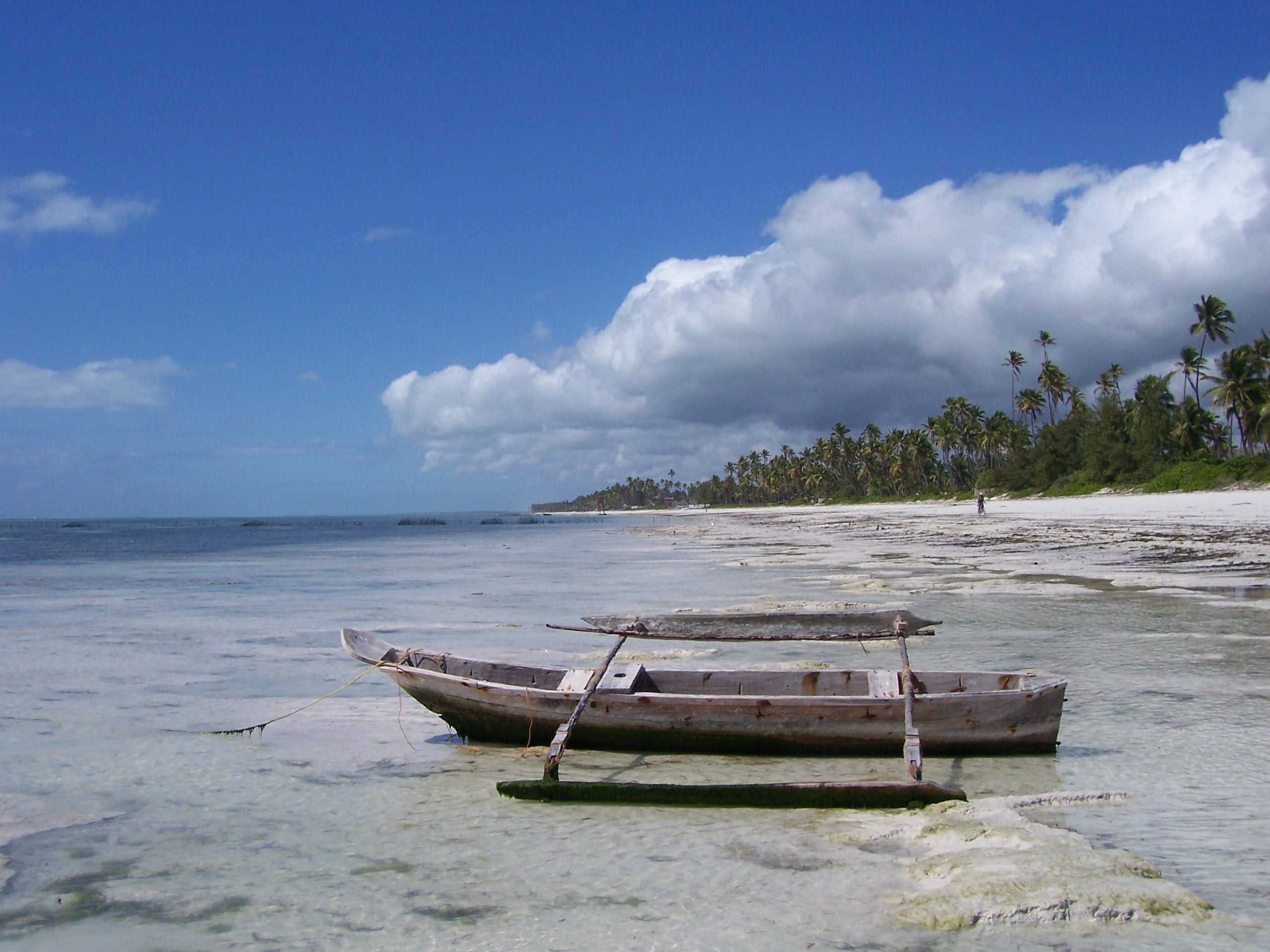
- Bwejuu's coastline at low tide.

- Location within Tanzania
- Coordinates: 6°14′S 39°32′E
- Country: Tanzania
- Province: Zanzibar
- Island: Unguja
- Time zone: UTC+3:00 (EAT)

Bwejuu is a village on the Tanzanian island of Unguja, part of Zanzibar. It is located in the southeast of the island, on the east coast immediately south of the Michamvi Peninsula and the open, beach-rich district known as Dongwe. The larger town of Jambiani lies seven kilometres to the south.
