= Kiwengwa =

Village in Zanzibar, Tanzania

Coordinates: 5.9855°S 39.3756°E

Kiwengwa is a village on the Tanzanian island of Unguja, part of Zanzibar. It is located on the northeast coast between the villages of Pongwe and Pwani Mchangani. It is also connected by road to Kinyasini, which lies eight kilometres to the west.
