= Bumbwini =

Village in Unguja, Zanzibar, Tanzania

Coordinates: 5.9522549°S 39.192942°E

Bumbwini is a village on the Tanzanian island of Unguja, part of Zanzibar. It is located in the northwest of the island, on a short peninsula immediately to the south of Tumbatu Island.
