= Machomane =

Machomane is a type of dance which is popularly known to be performed by traditional healers in Botswana who use strong African traditional medicine. Machomane dance is usually accompanied by three people who are drum beaters.
