= Pete, Zanzibar =

Village in Zanzibar, Tanzania

Coordinates: 6°17′S 39°25′E

Pete, Zanzibar is a village in Tanzania.
