= Jiso =

Village in Zanzibar, Tanzania

Coordinates: 4°56′S 39°45′E

Jiso is a village on the Zanzibari island of Pemba. It is located in the far north of the island, 12 kilometres north of Wete.
