= Chuini =

Village in Zanzibar, Tanzania

Coordinates: 6.0886772°S 39.222210°E

Chuini is a village on the Tanzanian island of Unguja, part of Zanzibar. It is located in the west of the island, 12 kilometres (7.5 mi) north of the capital, Zanzibar City.
