= Mangapwani =

Town in Zanzibar, Tanzania

Coordinates: 5.9924°S 39.1948°E

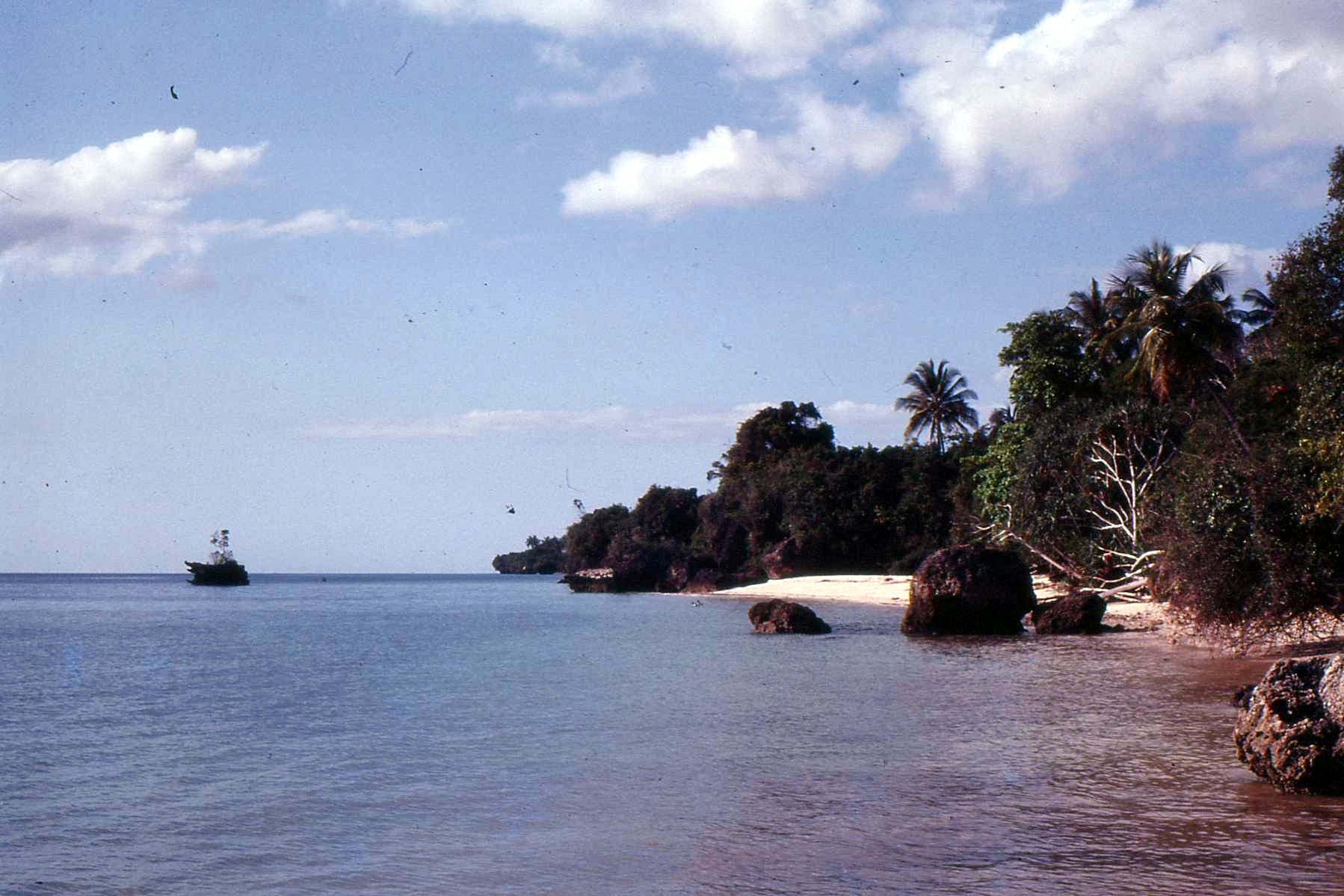
Mangapwani

Mangapwani is a town on the Tanzanian island of Unguja, the main island of Zanzibar. It is located on the northwest coast, 25 kilometres (16 mi) north of the Zanzibari capital of Stone Town.

The town's name means "Arabian Shore" in Swahili,
