= Koani =

- City of Unguja South Region
- Location in Tanzania
- Coordinates: 6°8′S 39°17′E
- Country: Tanzania
- Region: Zanzibar Central/South
- Time zone: UTC+3 (East Africa Time)

Koani is a city located on the Tanzanian island of Unguja (Zanzibar). The city serves as capital of the Zanzibar Central/South region.
