= Chwale =

Village on Pemba in Zanzibar, Tanzania

Coordinates: 5.0992101°S 39.813691°E

Chwale is a village on the Zanzibari island of Pemba. It is located in the northeast of the island, eight kilometres southeast of Wete. This village is locally famous for its annual bullfights in October.
