= Kendwa =

Village in Zanzibar, Tanzania

Coordinates: 5.75346°S 39.28973°E

Kendwa is a village on the Tanzanian island of Unguja, part of Zanzibar. It is located in the far north of the island, on the west coast overlooking the nearby small Daloni Island and the larger and more distant Tumbatu Island.

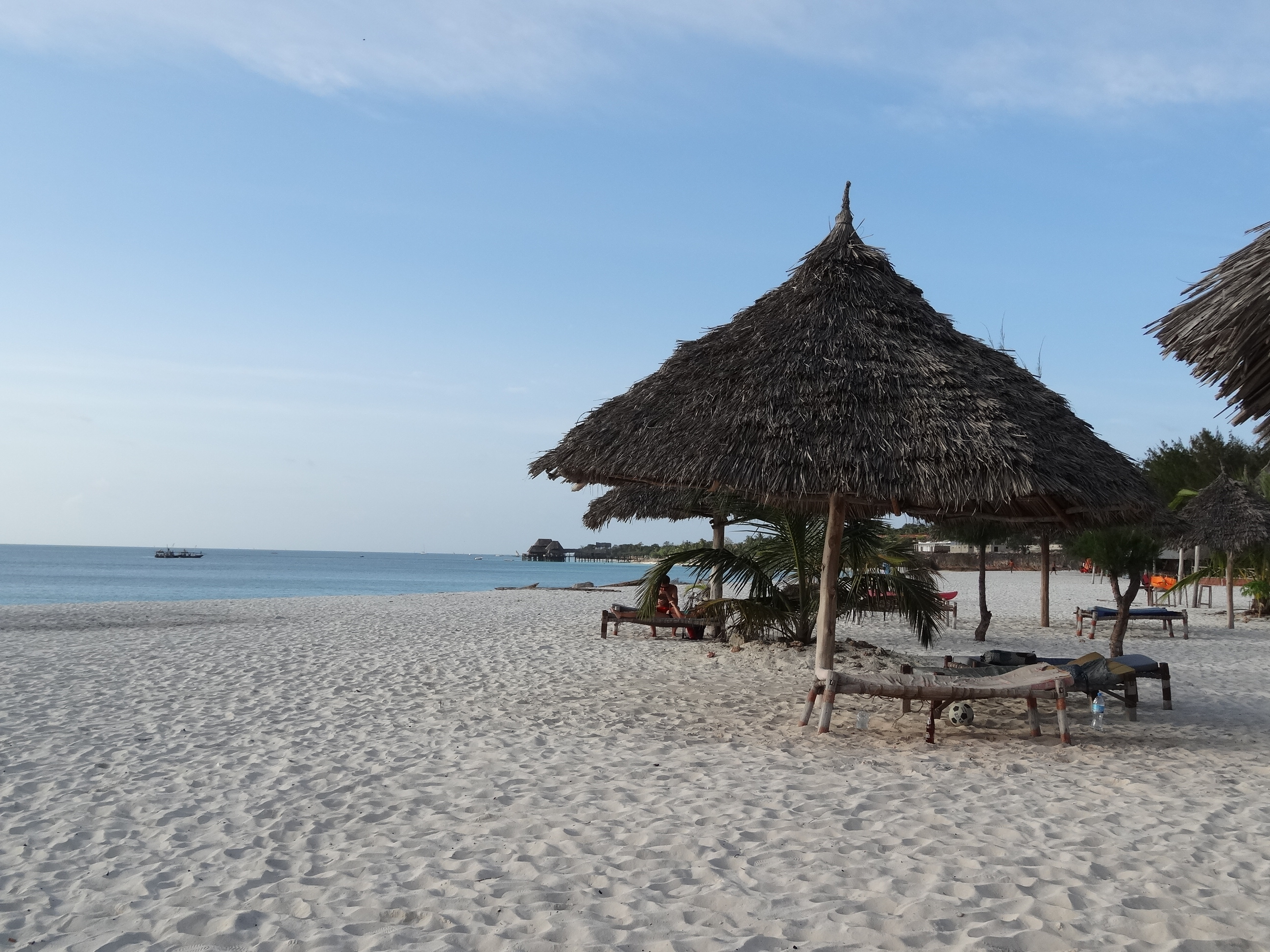
Kendwa beach
