= Mkokotoni =

City in Zanzibar north region, Tanzania

Coordinates: 5°52′48″S 39°16′23″E

Mkokotoni is a city located on the Tanzanian island of Unguja (Zanzibar). The city serves as the capital of the Zanzibar North region. It is 4 kilometres (2.5 mi) west of the village of Kibaoni.
