= Kibaoni =

Village in Zanzibar, Tanzania

Coordinates: 3°22′S 35°49′E

Kibaoni is a village on the Tanzanian island of Unguja, part of Zanzibar. It is located in the central north of the island, four kilometres to the east of Mkokotoni.

Kibaoni is also a village and business centre in Kenyan Coastal province of Kilifi county, Kilifi-North constituency. It is located right opposite of Pwani University main gate along the Mombasa-Malindi highway.

== Sources ==
- Finke, J. (2006). The Rough Guide to Zanzibar (2nd ed.). New York: Rough Guides.
