= Jambiani =

Coordinates: 6°19′S 39°33′E

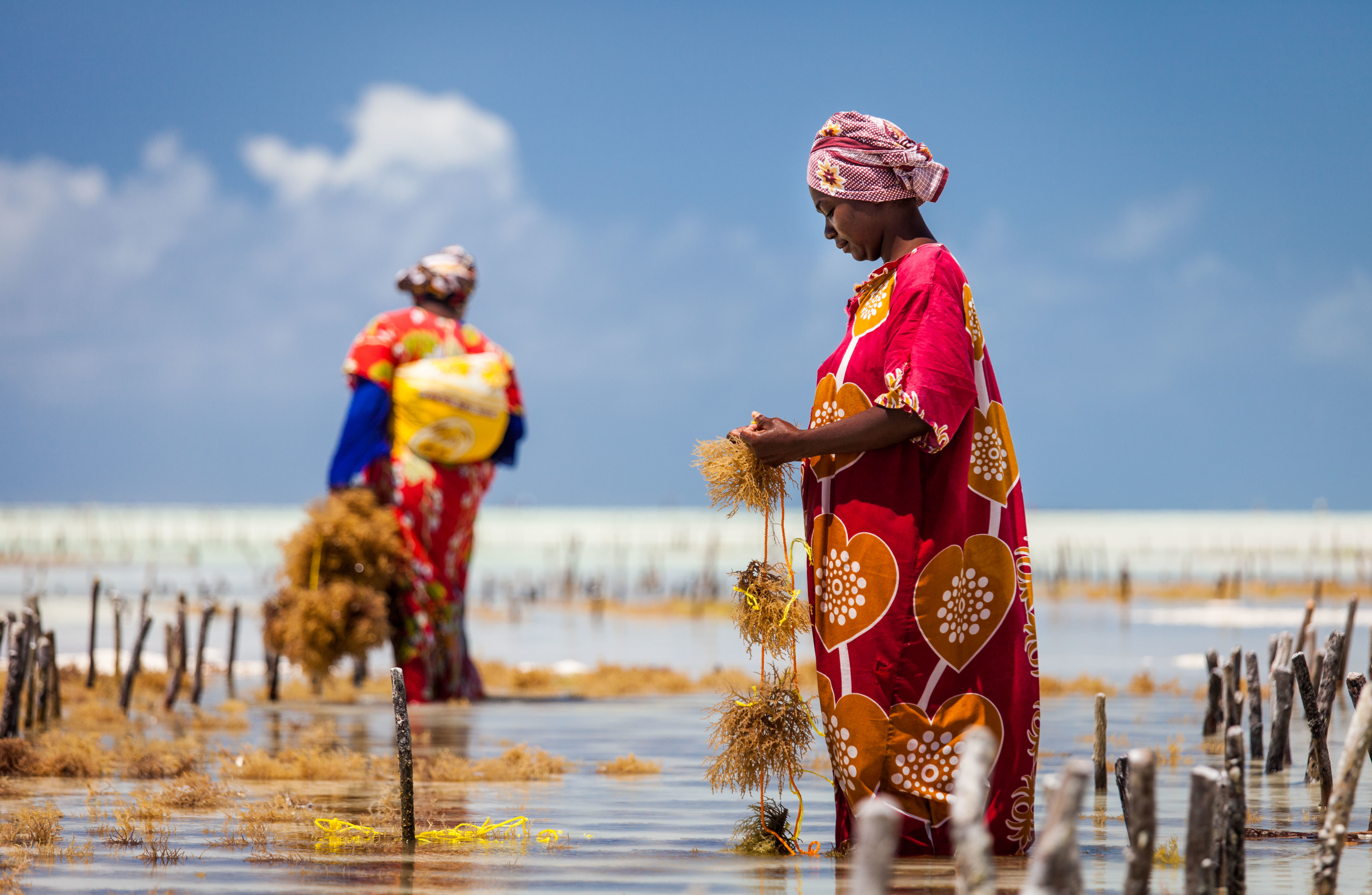
- Two women conducting seaweed farming in Jambiani.

- Location within Tanzania Location within Africa Location within Earth
- Country: Tanzania
- Time zone: UTC+3 (EAT)

Jambiani is a group of villages on the Tanzanian island of Unguja, part of Zanzibar. It is located on the southeast coast between Paje and Makunduchi.

== Economics ==
The population was estimated at 7,000 during the 2012 census. Between 900 and 1,000 people worked in the agricultural industry, while approximately 1,350 to 1,500 were employed in the fishing industry. Seaweed farming once made up a large part of the local economy, employing nearly 400 people, but the industry has since declined to roughly 50 workers, mostly women.

== Tourism ==
While somewhat low in population, the area is popular with tourists and features several notable attractions. The calm shallow waters off Jambiani beach are popular for kitesurfing, being sheltered by an offshore reef.

The area is also home to several hotels, including:

- Mamamapambo Boutique Hotel
- Spice Island Resort
- Blue Oyster Hotel

Other tourist attractions include Kuza Swimming Cave.

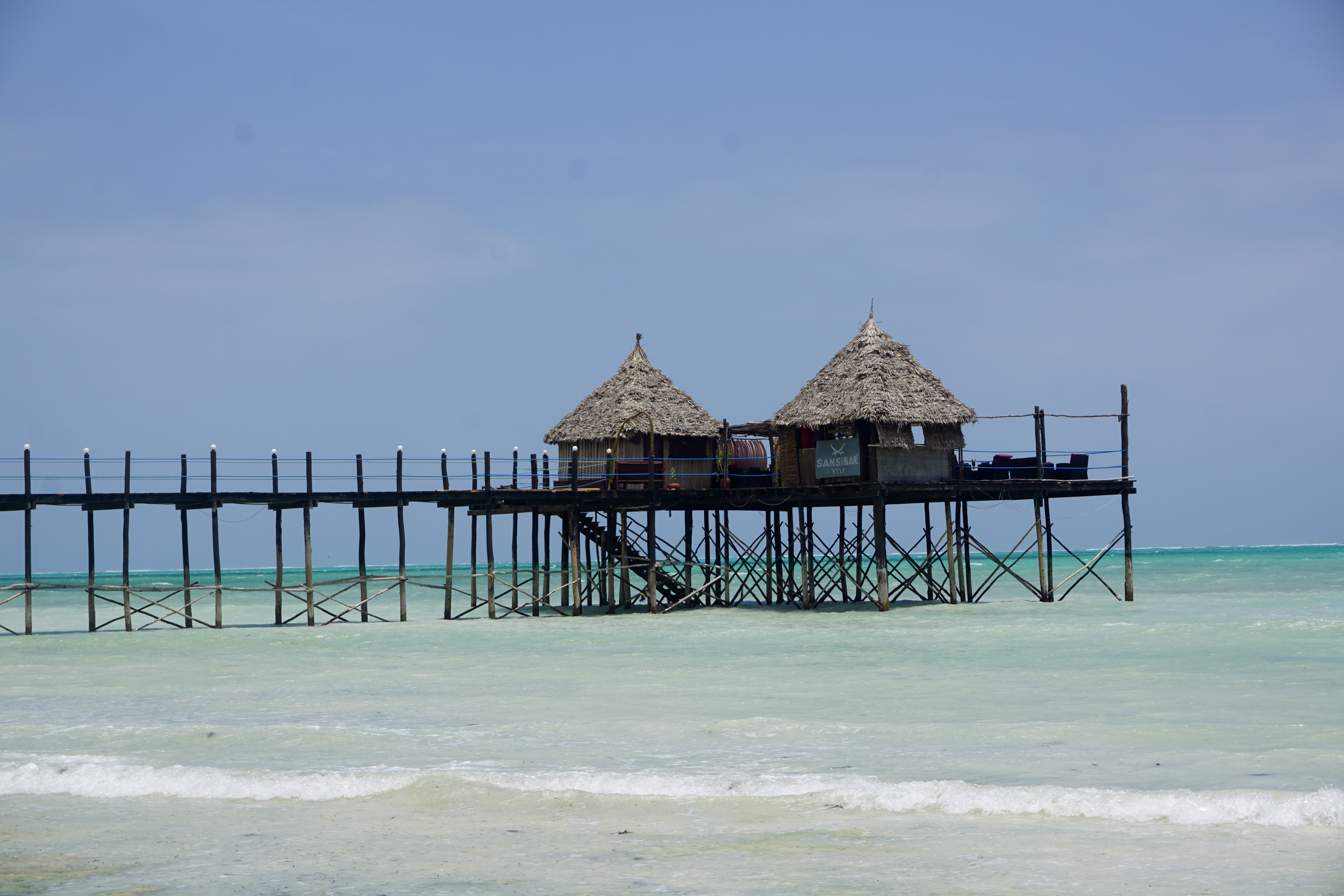
