= Kinyasini =

Village in Zanzibar, Tanzania

Coordinates: 5.968496°S 39.308524°E

Kinyasini is a village on the Tanzanian island of Unguja, part of Zanzibar. It is located in the central north of the island 10 kilometres to the south of Kibaoni. The village of Kinyasini is a bustling market place where the oceans products meet with the islands products. The market now has become a staple of the village and the nearby communities who sell their produce in the market. The market in Kinyasini is well known for its fresh fruit since it is in an inland location, but it also provides the inland islanders with fresh fish daily brought from Mkokotoni and Kiwengwa. This is also a common place to see local life and barter between the villages located inland and the one on the ocean front.
