= Chwaka =

Town on Unguja in Zanzibar, Tanzania

Coordinates: 6.1664°S 39.4357°E

Chwaka is a town on the Tanzanian island of Unguja, part of Zanzibar. It lies on the island's east coast, directly east of the capital, Zanzibar City, along the coast of Chwaka Bay, near the boundary of Jozani-Chwaka Bay National Park.

== See also ==
Historic Swahili Settlements
