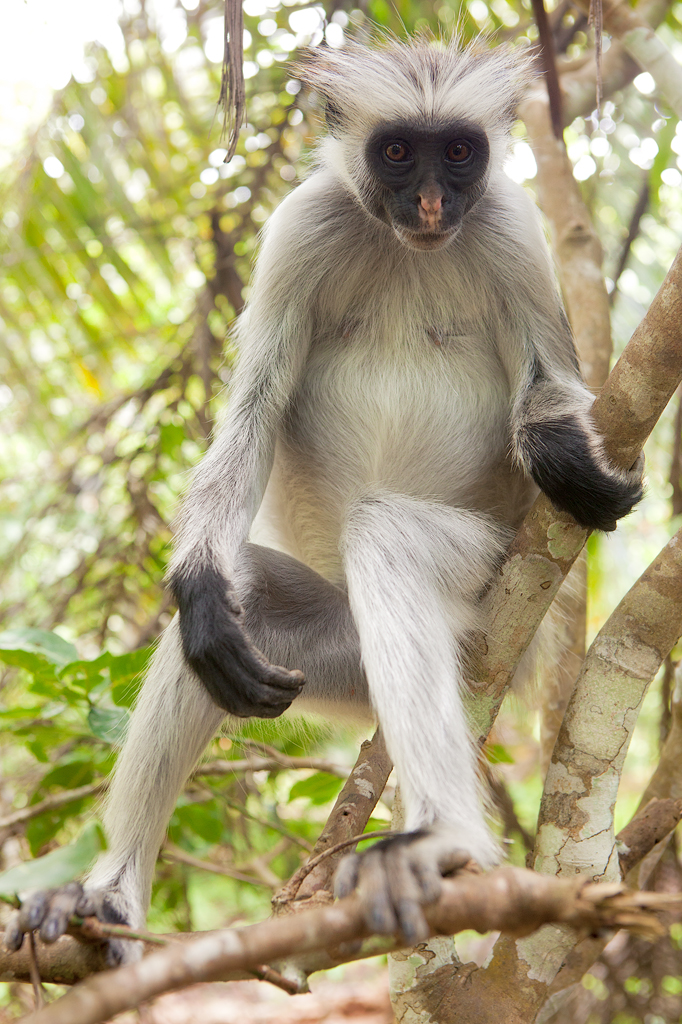
- Adult at Jozani Forest

Conservation status
- Endangered (IUCN 3.1)
- CITES Appendix I

Scientific classification
- Kingdom: Animalia
- Phylum: Chordata
- Class: Mammalia
- Order: Primates
- Family: Cercopithecidae
- Genus: Piliocolobus
- Species: P. kirkii

Binomial name
- Piliocolobus kirkii (J.E. Gray, 1868)
- geographic range extant (resident) extinct

= Zanzibar red colobus =

Species of Old World monkey

The Zanzibar red colobus (Piliocolobus kirkii) is a species of red colobus monkey endemic to Unguja, the main island of the Zanzibar Archipelago, off the coast of Tanzania. It is also known as Kirk's red colobus after Sir John Kirk, the British Resident of Zanzibar who first brought it to the attention of zoological science. It is now classified as an endangered species and in the mid-1990s was adopted as the flagship species for conservation in Zanzibar. The population is still decreasing, and conservationists are attempting to work with the local government to devise a proper, effective strategy to protect the population and habitat. Challenges include the species' habitat, which is limited to the archipelago. The species has been reclassified three times; it was previously in the genus Colobus, then in the genus Procolobus, and later in the genus Piliocolobus.

== Evolutionary history and taxonomy ==
The Zanzibar red colobus, Piliocolobus kirkii, population on Zanzibar, represents a population of red colobus that is believed to have been isolated on the island after sea levels rose toward the end of the Pleistocene epoch. Furthermore, it is suggested through mitochondrial analysis, that phylogenetic groups within the red colobus have been genetically isolated from another since the Pliocene.

Examining cranial morphology has shown that P. kirkii has diverged from mainland Piliocolobus to its own species. It has experienced an acceleration in morphological evolution of size which is suggested to be the result of insularity on the island and environmental pressures such as competition, habitat, predation and/or resource availability. There has been no evidence for population bottlenecks in the species.

The smaller cranium of P. kirkii in contrast to the mainland colobus monkey, is consistent with Foster's rule (also known as the island rule) in which the original (larger) animal becomes smaller over time when there are limited resources. Males tend to have pedomorphic traits which include a shorter face, large orbits and an enlarged neurocranium. It is not certain how long ago and where this evolutionary change occurred.

Through molecular analyses, it is indicated that P. kirkii is more closely related to the Udzungwa red colobus (P. gordonorum) compared to other red colobus species. This analysis has also placed the divergence of P. kirkii from its sister species P. gordonorum at about 600,000 years ago, which actually allows for an older evolutionary age compared to the previous assumption that it had become its own species around the last glacial period. The species has been reclassified twice; it was previously in the genus Colobus, and more recently in the genus Procolobus and then the genus Piliocolobus.

An alternative common name is Kirk's red colobus after Sir John Kirk (1832–1922), the British Resident of Zanzibar who first brought it to the attention of zoological science.

== Physical description ==
This Old World monkey's coat ranges from dark red to black, accented with a black stripe along the shoulders and arms, and a pale underside. Its black face is crowned with long, white hair, and features a distinguishing pink mark on its lips and nose. Also, the Zanzibar red colobus has a long tail used only for balancing—it is not prehensile. Sexual dimorphism is generally decreased in the species, meaning the females have little difference in their body size and colour from their male counterparts. Females usually outnumber the males in their groups. The species has a notably small cranium and rotund body shape, with males potentially reaching over 12 kg (26 lb) and females, 10 kg (22 lb). In adults, highly differentiated facial features help them to distinguish each other in a group.

The word "colobus" comes from Greek ekolobóse, meaning "he cut short", and is so named because of the significant reduction in size, or complete lack of an opposable thumb in comparison to other primates. To make up for this, they have four long digits that align to form a strong hook, allowing them to easily grasp branches and climb.

Locals on the island have called the Zanzibar red colobus kima punju which means "poison monkey" in Swahili because of their strong smell unlike other monkeys. This has caused people to hold negative views of the monkey and even to say it has an evil influence on trees on which they feed, ultimately killing the trees.

== Habitat ==
The Zanzibar red colobus is found in three forests of the Zanzibar archipelago. It displays a wide habit tolerance, but it is mainly an arboreal species and prefers drier areas over wet ones. Its habitats include coastal thickets and coastal rag scrub, but it can also be found in agricultural areas and in mangrove swamps; the latter provides food year-round. When found in agricultural areas, the monkey is more used to humans and comes closer to the ground.

About 1,600 to 3,000 individuals remain, and currently, 50% of the monkeys found on the islands live outside protected zones. The largest and most significant area of protection and habitat for the monkey is in Jozani National Park, which provides 25 km^{2} (9.7 sq mi) of land reserve. It is located on the main island and the populations here have been greatly studied in regards to both their ecology and behavior. Even so, many groups have been found in shambas (Swahili for "farmland") in close proximity to the park. In these shambas adjacent to the park, higher densities of the red colobus have been reported living here in more cohesive groups, compared to inside the park reserve. The incidence of some of these monkeys living permanently outside the zone of the protected park reserve can increase the endangerment of the groups.

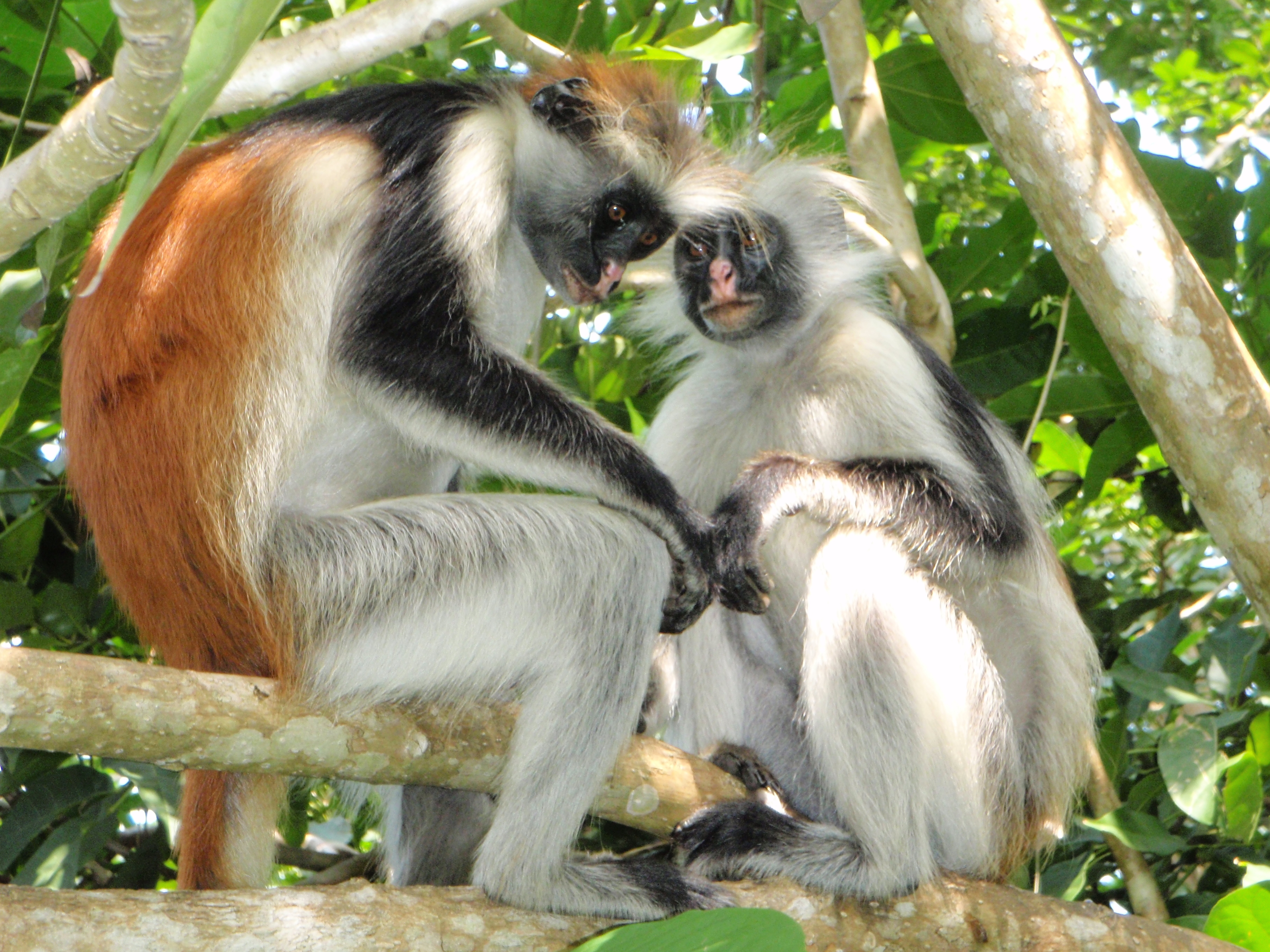
At Jozani Forest

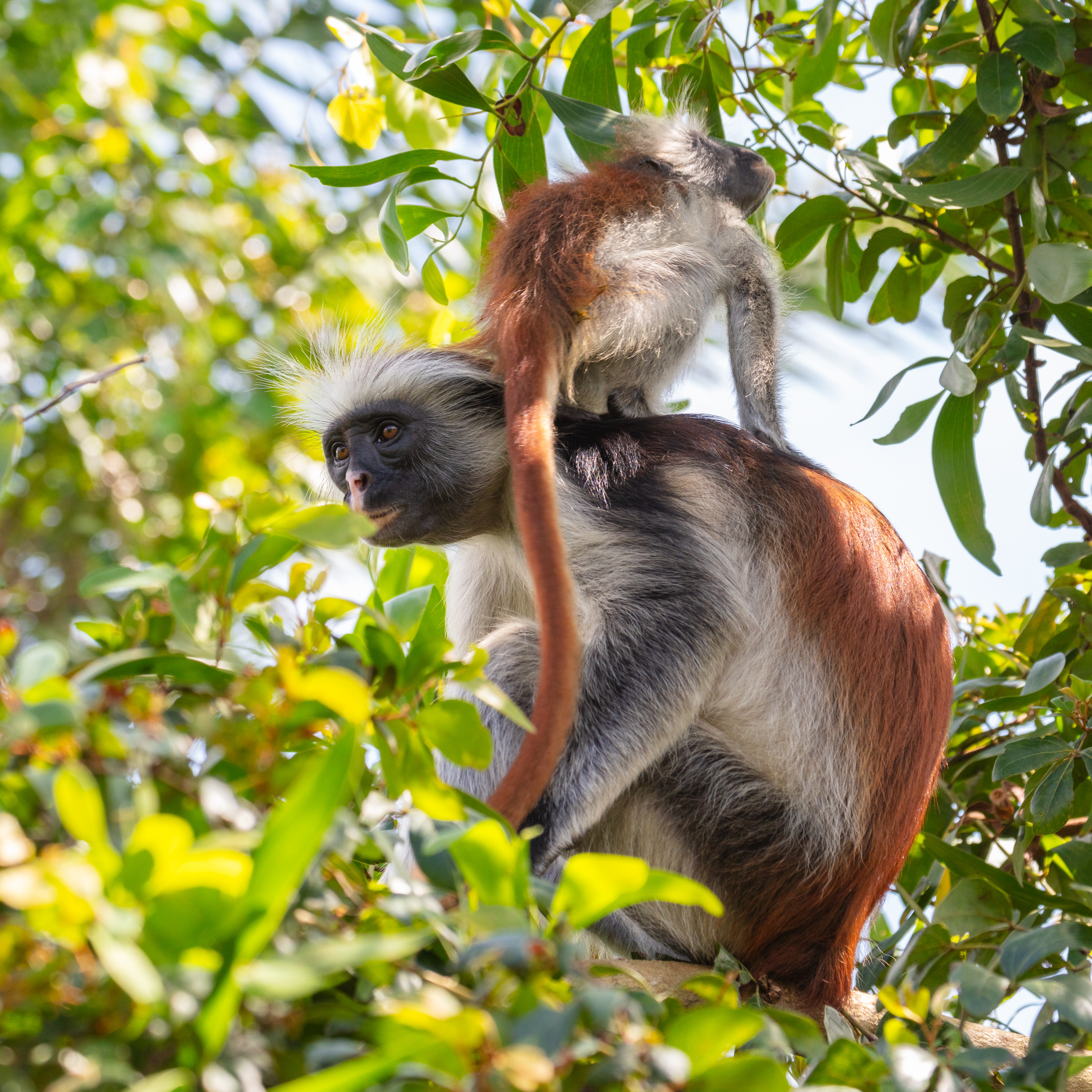
A mother and baby

== Behavior ==
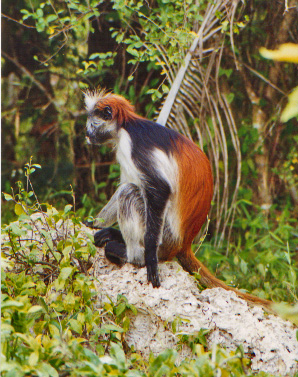
Males and females share the same coat pattern

The groups consist of up to four adult males and many adult females; typically yielding a 1:2 ratio of males to females. Young of varying ages are also incorporated in the group. The number of monkeys in a group can range from 30 to 50 individuals. The species is a very social animal, and can often be observed playing and grooming during the rest periods between meals. Unlike females, in a group, males actually maintain close bonds, acting together in defense of their group and even in grooming each other.

=== Feeding ===
Feeding is also a group activity. It begins to feed in the morning, and is more active during the cooler parts of the day. Loud calls from males indicate the group is ready to move to another tree to feed. This monkey is mainly a foliovore, and on average, half of the leaves consumed are young leaves. They also eat leaf shoots, seeds, flowers, and unripe fruit. It has also been found eating bark, dead wood, and soil. It is one of the few species that do not eat ripe fruits; it has a sacculated stomach with four chambers specific for breaking down plant materials, however it cannot digest the sugars contained in mature fruits. Because the monkey feeds on young leaves (though not limited to them), there are instances where it consumes charcoal, which is believed to aid their digestion of the toxins (possibly phenolic compounds) found in the young leaves of the Indian almond tree and mango tree. The habit of consuming charcoal is thought to be a learned behavior presumably passed on from the mother to her offspring. The presence of charcoal deposits were shown to result in these monkeys being more likely to inhabit areas that had trees as a food source that were rich in phenolics. It has been noted, however, that not all populations on the islands carry out the behavior, but that it is rather mostly done by those who consume more perennial and exotic foliage.

Since some populations use mangroves as a source of food, it is natural for the monkey to consume more sodium chloride (NaCl). Because of this, those populations have been observed to drink water directly from tree-holes, or licking water off of leaves. This innovative behavior shows the adaptation of the monkey to novel ecological and environmental circumstances.

In the dry season, one of the staple foods, Indian almond tree, as previously mentioned, drops its leaves and can cause the monkey to go beyond park boundaries in order to extend its feeding range. This puts the already endangered colobine at more risk.

=== Reproduction ===
Males usually reach sexual maturity at about 3–3.5 years old, while females attain it at about two years old. Females approaching estrous can be easily identified because of the swelling and bright red coloration of the genital area. This signals to males that the given female is ready for mating. Moreover, just prior to mating, males will use their fingers to probe the female's birth canal. This is immediately followed by sniffing the area because estrogen and progesterone can be detected by this method, further helping the male conclude if the female is indeed ready to breed.

Gestation is about six months for colobus monkeys; one female typically has about one or two new-born every two years. Parental care is intense and often, the role is shared by multiple females of the group. It is observed that about 76% of offspring are born between September and December. Infanticide has also been noted on occasion when a new male joins a given group that has infants.

Research has suggested that the ability for dietary expansion, which consuming charcoal partly allows, explains the higher birth rates and densities due to resource availability. Birth rates for those living in mangroves are higher than colobus monkeys living in coral rag forests.

There are higher birthing rates between October–December for colobines on Uzi Island and then January–February for those in Kiwengwa, located on the eastern side of the main island. Infant mortality can be significantly high with half of the infants born not reaching more than six months of age. The birth rates themselves, however, are actually decreased in comparison to mainland colobus monkeys and interbirth intervals are longer as well. Research has suggested that this is a consequence of disturbed habitats in which mainland colobi are not so affected.

=== Communication ===
The red colobus species have a smaller larynx compared to other members of the Colobinae subfamily. The male's call is more of an alto or soprano in contrast to the low bass of a male's in black-and-white colobus species. The Zanzibar red colobus is non-territorial in nature and as so does not typically make loud, territorial threat calls. Zanzibar red colobus distress and warning calls are the "bark", "chist", or "wheet". One of the loudest calls from the monkey is heard when he expresses his dominance over the group and when checking the sexual status of his females.

The call heard most often by people in or near Jozani Forest is the 'alerting signal'. This is an attention-getting call that is derived from the progression call. Chirps and grunts are made when there are changes in the surrounding environment such as changes in weather or animal movement in proximity to the group. With most arboreal animals, there are two different alerting calls, one for when a predator is on land, and another when there is an aerial predator. However, because of the lack of larger birds of prey in Zanzibar, such calls are not often witnessed. The young, on the other hand, because of their smaller size and vulnerability, do at times make such calls when they see shadows.

Because the Zanzibar red colobus is extremely social, it has a specific call for when it is alone for a certain amount of time upon which it feels vulnerable or threatened. The young are typically the ones to make such a call that sounds like a loud scream, but adults are occasionally likely (when deemed necessary) to make some variation of the call as well.

== Conservation ==
A number of factors have contributed to the monkey's endangered status. First, an increase in deforestation has resulted in a significant reduction in resources and habitat; second, it is hunted for meat and pet markets. To counteract the decline in population, various attempts have been made to protect the species. In 1974, specimens were moved to Ngezi Forest on Pemba Island to try to re-establish the monkey's population. It had been found, however, that 20 years after the translocation to the island only one group of Zanzibar red colobus was found and with few sightings and interviews with locals, the population was estimated to be between 15 and 30 individuals. Researchers concluded that the group had certainly survived but did not increase in number possibly due to adverse relations with humans. Some locals in Pemba hold superstitions against the monkey because of the idea that it brings bad luck upon farmers. This may explain the reason that they have not significantly grown in population size.

On Uzi and Vundwe Islands, the Zanzibar red colobus is subject to extensive habitat destruction, particularly with coral rag forests. There is also reported poisoning, netting, and disappearance of monkeys as well as other with animals.

Various attempts have been made for conservation of the species. One project was with the World Wildlife Fund, specifically in Menai Bay which is located just west of Uzi Island. Another funded by the Wildlife Conservation Society designated the Zanzibar red colobus as the flagship species in a long-term study on population, human influence, and behaviour.

The African Convention has played a role in the conservation of the animal by categorizing it as 'Class A.' According to the document African Convention on the Conservation of Nature and Natural Resources, 'Class A' is described as:

species in Class A shall be totally protected throughout the entire territory of the Contracting States; the hunting, killing, capture or collection of specimens shall be permitted only on the authorization in each case of the highest competent authority and only if required in the national interest or for scientific purposes.

It has been suggested that an important way to promote conservation of the monkey is to simply spread awareness about it – that it is not a harmful animal and that it can actually be good for the region's economy because it draws tourism. This has been the case on the island of Unguja (Zanzibar). Furthermore, it would be necessary to establish and designate protected zones.
