= Magharibi District =

Zanzibar West District
- District
- Location in Tanzania
- Coordinates: 06°10′S 039°17′E
- Country: Tanzania
- Region: Zanzibar Urban/West Region

Population (2012)
  - Total: 370,645

Zanzibar West District is one of the two districts of the Zanzibar Urban/West Region of Tanzania. It is bordered to the north by the Zanzibar North Region, to the east by the Zanzibar Central/South Region, to the south by Kiwani Bay, and to the west by the Zanzibar Urban District.

As of 2002 Census, the population of the Zanzibar West District was 184,204, but by the 2012 Census it had more than doubled to 370,645

== Administrative subdivisions ==
=== Constituencies ===
For parliamentary elections, Tanzania is divided into constituencies. As of the 2010 elections the area for Zanzibar West District had nine of the nineteen constituencies in the region:

- Bububu Constituency
- Dimani Constituency
- Dole Constituency
- Fuoni Constituency
- Kiembesamaki Constituency
- Magogoni Constituency
- Mfenesini Constituency
- Mtoni Constituency
- Mwanakwerekwe Constituency

=== Wards ===
As of 2002, the Zanzibar West District was administratively divided into thirty-nine wards:

Nr.	Ward (Shehia)	Population 2002	Parliamentary Constituency	Remarks
1	Sharifu Msa	4,975	Bububu	
2	Kibweni	7,115	Bububu	
3	Mwanyanya	9,683	Bububu	
4	Bububu	15,666	Bububu	
5	Kihinani	14,139	Mfenesini	
6	Chuini	6,158	Mfenesini	
7	Kama	2,921	Mfenesini	
8	Mfenesini	2,803	Mfenesini	
9	Mwakaje	2,907	Mfenesini	
10	Mbuzini	5,856	Mfenesini	"on the goat"
11	Bumbwisudi	2,269	Dole	
12	Kizimbani	3,304	Dole	
13	Dole	3,933	Dole	
14	Kianga	9,908	Dole	
15	Mwera	10,238	Dole	
16	Mtufaani	9,123	Dole	
17	Mtoni	6,571	Mtoni	"in the river"
18	Mtoni Kidatu	16,612	Mtoni	
19	Mto Pepo	16,440	Mtoni	
20	Welezo	13,119	Magogoni	
21	Magogoni	14,928	Magogoni	
22	Kinuni	11,333	Magogoni	
23	Pangawe	26,275	Fuoni	
24	Fuoni Kibondeni	15,40	Fuoni	
25	Maungani	4,048	Fuoni	
26	Fuoni Kijito Upele	19,374	Fuoni	
27	Mwanakwerekwe	20,215	Mwanakwerekwe	
28	Meli Nne	16,984	Mwanakwerekwe	
29	Tomondo	23,354	Mwanakwerekwe	
30	Mombasa	14,492	Dimani	
31	Kisauni	9,331	Dimani	
32	Shakani	2,760	Dimani	
33	Nyamanzi	1,287	Dimani	
35	Dimani	2,052	Dimani	
34	Kombeni	3,162	Dimani	
36	Bweleo	971	Dimani	
37	Fumba	981	Dimani	
38	Kiembesamaki	11,760	Kiembesamaki	
39	Chukwani	8,298	Kiembesamaki	
Total	Zanzibar West	370,645		
