= Jozani Chwaka Bay National Park =

National park in Tanzania

- IUCN category II (national park)
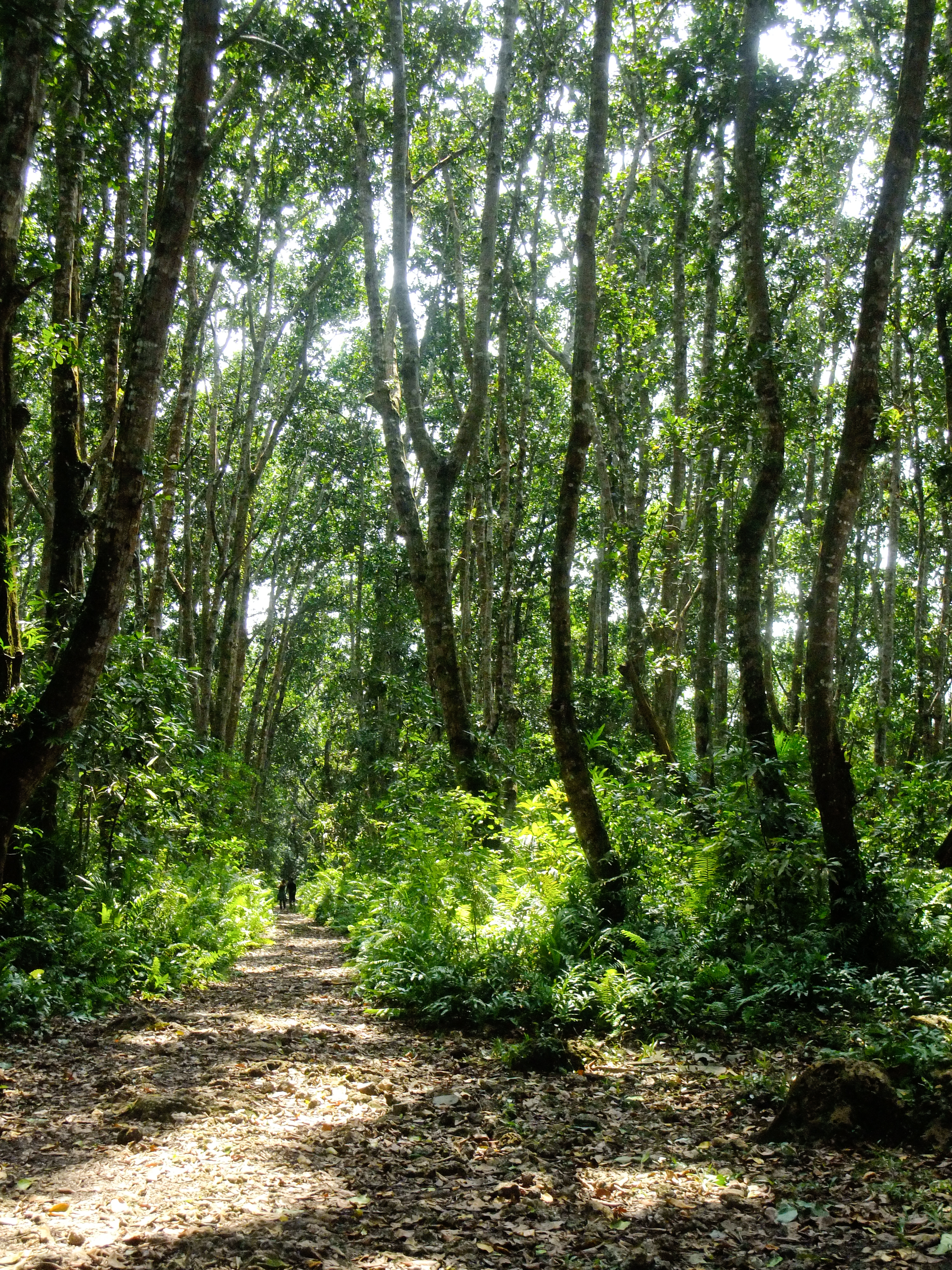

- Location within Tanzania
- Location: Zanzibar, Tanzania
- Nearest city: Jozani
- Coordinates: 6.233°S 39.404°E
- Area: 50 km^{2} (19 mi^{2})
- Established: 2004
- Governing body: Tanzania National Parks Authority
- Website: www.tanzaniaparks.go.tz

The Jozani Chwaka Bay National Park is a 50 km^{2} (19 mi^{2}) national park in Tanzania located on the island of Zanzibar. It is the only national park in Zanzibar.

The Zanzibar red colobus, Procolobus kirkii (its population count is about 1000) found in the park, a rain forest species (unlike the black-and-white colobus found in other regions of Africa), is also known as Kirk's red colobus, named after Sir John Kirk, the British Resident of Zanzibar who had first brought it to the attention of zoological science. It is now adopted as the flagship species for conservation in Zanzibar, from the mid-1990s. Other species of fauna found in the park are the Sykes monkey, bush babies, more than 50 species of butterfly and 40 species of birds. The nocturnal Zanzibar tree hyrax, which has four 'toes' on its front feet and three on its back, is said to be the first hyrax species that has acclimatized to the forest. As part of the tourism circuit, the park attracts 10% of the over 100,000 visitors to Zanzibar every year. Wild life attractions of Zanzibar also include dolphins apart from deep sea fishing for tuna, marlin, and shark.

Another animal in the forests of the Unguja Island unequaled elsewhere is the Zanzibar leopard (Panthera pardus adersi). which was believed to be extinct. In Swahili, a leopard is called 'Chui' and is part of the superstitious beliefs of the people. People believe that sorcerers keep this animal as their pet and scare people by spinning stories that the animal appears like spirits and disappears into thin air, which most likely comes from the fact that Leopards are very shy of humans and elusive. It was last reported in 1999 and officials, and men working on the "coral rag" lands of the southern and eastern Ungula Island are assertive that the species is not extinct, though it has not been sighted since 2003. The last sighting reported in 2002-2003 was of two leopards. Photographs of live examples of the species are not known to exist, although a stuffed example is a museum display in Zanzibar Museum, and a few skins exist in museums in London and Massachusetts. Trail camera footage from a 2018 American documentary television series does appear to have captured proof of the leopard's existence and will undoubtedly spark renewed interest and further protective enforcements. A smaller leopard with spots, which is a biological product of the larger animal, is seen now in the island.

The sea grass beds of the Chwaka Bay, fringed with mangrove forests, are important breeding grounds for marine organisms, including open sea fish species. The mangroves are also good breeding grounds for birds. An Integrated Conservation and Development (ICD) planning for the area is under consideration. The bay is also proposed to be declared a Ramsar Site and is placed on the Tanzanian Tentative List for World Heritage Sites to recognize its unique natural and cultural assets with due consideration of proposed conservation efforts.

== Ecology ==
According to the International Union for Conservation of Nature and Natural Resources, the park site occupies "the largest remaining stand of near-natural forest on Zanzibar." The forest rests upon a reef limestone marine terrace. Habitats within the park and associated protected lands include a groundwater forest, coastal forest, and grassland, with mangroves and salt marsh at the coast. The vegetation types found within the park once existed throughout Zanzibar.

Endangered animals that reside within the park include:

- the Zanzibar red colobus (Piliocolobus kirkii), an endemic monkey species that exists only in Zanzibar.
- the Aders' duiker (Cephalophus adersi)
- the Zanzibar servaline genet (Genetta servalina archeri)
- the Zanzibar leopard

=== Important Bird Areas ===
The park encompasses two adjoining Important Bird Areas (IBAs) designated by BirdLife International. Jozani Forest supports populations of Fischer's turacos, mangrove kingfishers, brown-headed parrots, black-bellied starlings, east coast akalats, mouse-coloured sunbirds and Zanzibar red bishops. Chiwaka Bay and its surrounds on the east coast, including extensive stands of mangroves along its southern shore, support populations of greater sandplovers, crab plovers and Saunders's terns.

== Ecotourism ==
CARE International sponsored a development project for the wilderness area and surrounding communities from 1995 until 2003.

A revenue sharing program from park entrance fees has been used to construct schools and health clinics for local villages.

== Gallery ==
Female with baby, Red colobus monkey

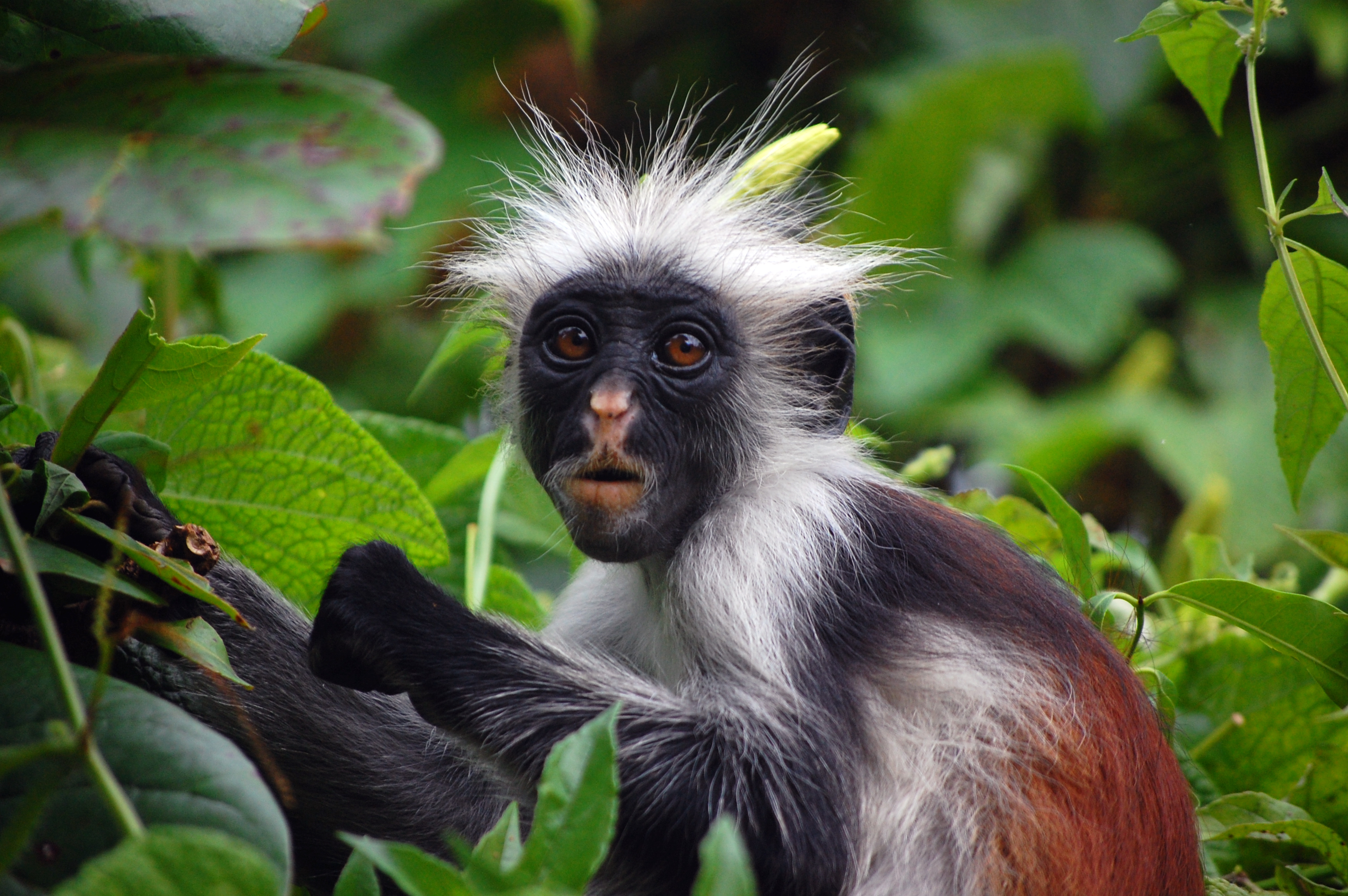
Kirk's red colobus of Zanzibar, Procolobus kirkii, Jozani

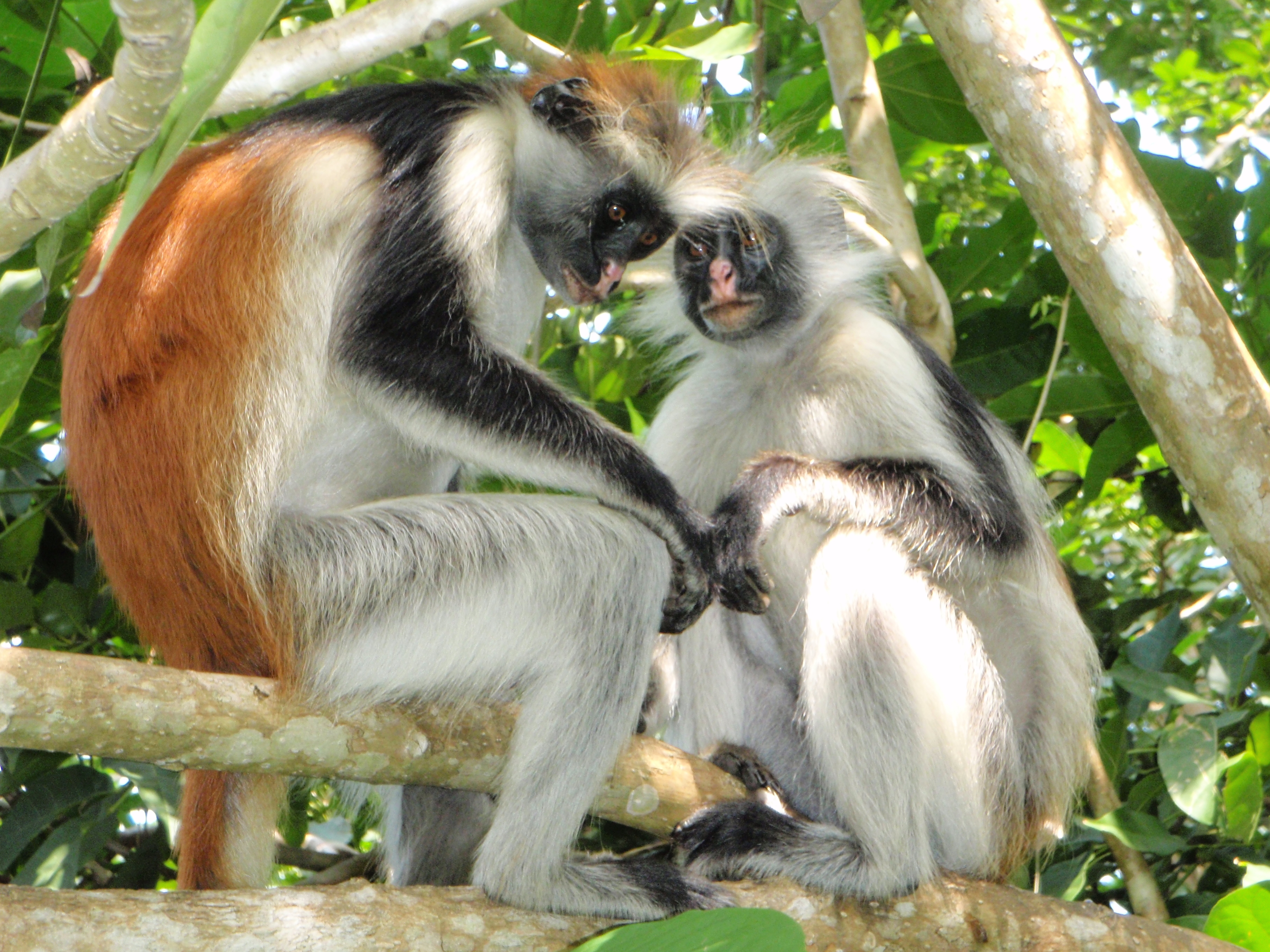
Red colobus monkeys in Jozani

Blue monkey eating mango

East African mahogany tree (Khaya anthotheca)

Crowned hornbill
