= Unguja =

Tanzanian island of the Zanzibar Archipelago

Nickname: Zanzibar Island
- Unguja

- Location within Tanzania

Geography
- Coordinates: 6°08′S 39°20′E
- Archipelago: Zanzibar Archipelago
- Area: 1,666 km^{2} (643 sq mi)
- Length: 85 km (52.8 mi)
- Width: 30 km (19 mi)
- Highest elevation: 195 m (640 ft)
- Highest point: Unnamed point in the Koani chain

Administration
- Tanzania
- Region: Zanzibar

Demographics
- Population: 896,721 (2012)

Unguja (also referred to as "Zanzibar Island" or simply "Zanzibar") is the largest and most populated island of the Zanzibar archipelago, in Tanzania. It is home to Zanzibar City, the capital of the Zanzibar region, which includes the historic Stone Town.

== Geography ==
Unguja is a hilly island, about 85 kilometres (53 miles) long (north-south) and 30 kilometres (19 miles) wide (east-west) at its widest, with an overall area of about 1,666 square kilometres (643 square miles). It is located in the northern half of the Zanzibar Archipelago, in the Indian Ocean, about 59 kilometres (37 mi) south of the second largest island of the archipelago, Pemba. Unguja and mainland Tanzania are separated by the Zanzibar Channel.

Unguja is surrounded by a number of smaller islands and islets, with only two of them, Tumbatu and Uzi, being inhabited. Other minor islands around Unguja include Bawe, Chapwani, Changuu, Chumbe, Kizingo, Kwale, Latham, Mautani, Miwi, Mnemba, Mwana wa Mwana, Nianembe, Popo, Pungume, and Ukanga.

== Politics ==
Unguja and the surrounding islands are divided into three regions:

- Zanzibar Central/ South (capital: Koani),
- Zanzibar North (capital: Mkokotoni) and
- Zanzibar Urban/ West (capital: Zanzibar City).

Unguja belongs to Zanzibar, which is defined by the Tanzanian Constitution as "a part" of Tanzania with a high degree of autonomy. The local Zanzibari government is based in Stone Town, on the west coast of Unguja.

== Population ==
As of the 2012 census, the total population of Unguja was 896,721, mostly concentrated in the Zanzibar urban region. The main settlement on the island is Zanzibar City, which serves as a capital for Zanzibar and which includes the renowned historical city of Stone Town as well as other populated areas such as Michenzani. Other major settlements on Unguja include Mbweni, Mangapwani, Chwaka, and Nungwi.

People of Unguja mostly speak kiunguja ("the language of Unguja"), which is the dialect of the Swahili language that was used as the main model for the definition of standard Swahili.

== Economy ==
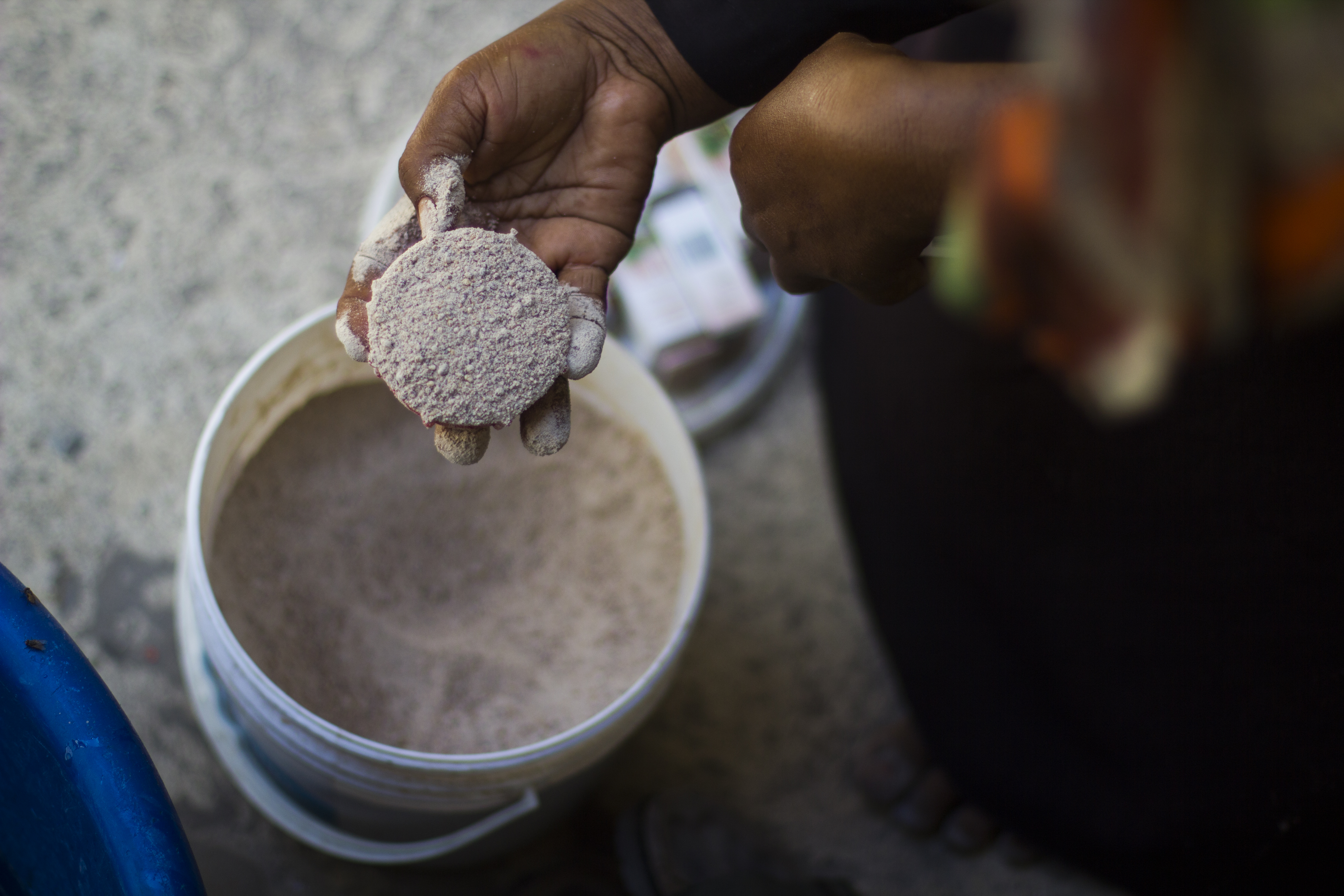
Soap made of seaweed

Unguja is the island of the Zanzibar Archipelago that has the most developed tourism industry. This accounts for a substantial part of Unguja's economy. Agriculture (including the production of spices such as cloves) and fishing are other relevant activities. All along the east coast, most villages also rely on seaweed farming.

== Ecology ==
Notable mammal species on the island include the Zanzibar servaline genet, African palm civet, and Zanzibar red colobus. In June 2018, a leopard was caught on camera here, despite previously being considered extinct in Zanzibar for the past 25 years.
