= Mount Meru University =

Private university in Arusha, Tanzania

Coordinates: 3°18′0″S 36°38′0″E

- Chuo Kikuu cha Mlima Meru (Swahili)
- Former name: IBTSEA
- Motto: Foundation of Real Knowledge
- Type: Private
- Established: 2005; 21 years ago
- Affiliations: Baptists' Church of Tanzania
- Students: 996 (2009/10)
- Location: Arusha, Tanzania
- Campus: Rural
- Website: University Website

Mount Meru University (MMU) is a private university in Arusha, Tanzania. It was founded in 1962 as International Baptist Theological Seminary of Eastern Africa (IBTSEA). It is affiliated with the Baptists' Church of Tanzania. It became an accredited university in 2005.
