= Baptists' Church of Tanzania =

Christian denomination in Tanzania

- Abbreviation: BCT
- Classification: Protestant
- Orientation: Baptist
- Theology: Evangelical Baptist
- Associations: Baptist World Alliance
- Headquarters: Dar es Salaam, Tanzania
- Origin: 1971
- Congregations: 1,432
- Members: 2,692,179
- Tertiary institutions: Mount Meru University
- Seminaries: 2
- Official website: bct-tanzania.net (From 2023 Internet Archive)

The Baptists' Church of Tanzania is an denomination of Baptists, affiliated with the Baptist World Alliance, in Tanzania. The headquarters is in Dar es Salaam, Tanzania.

== History ==
The Baptists' Church of Tanzania formally Baptist Convention of Tanzania started in 1956 by an American mission of the International Mission Board. The Baptists' Church of Tanzania was officially formed in 1971.

According to a census published by the association in 2025, it claimed 1,432 churches and 2,692,179 members.

== Schools ==
It has 2 affiliated theological institutes.

Mount Meru University is affiliated.

== See also ==
- Bible
- Born again
- Jesus Christ
- Believers' Church
