= Wildlife of Zanzibar =

Flora and fauna of Zanzibar

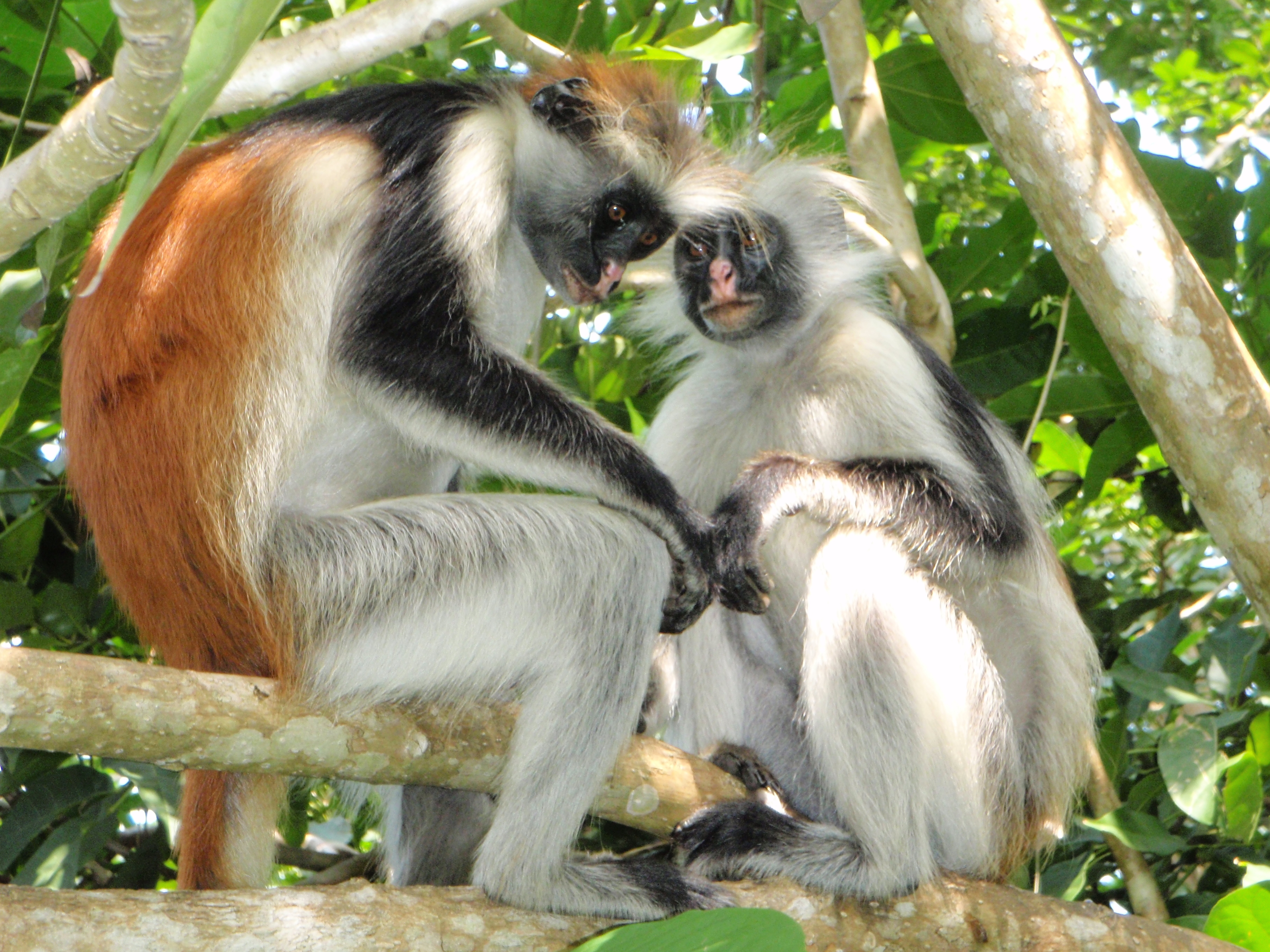
Zanzibar red colobus, an endangered species.

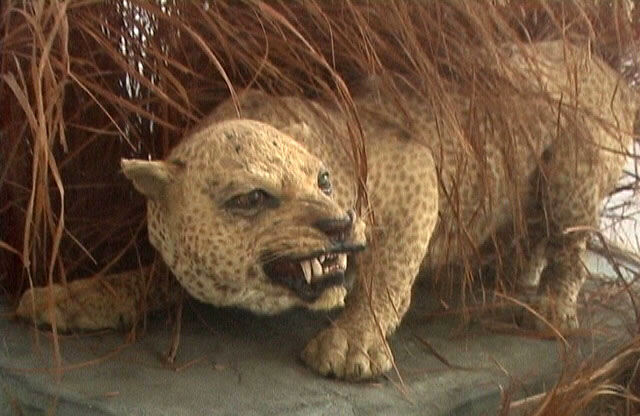
Zanzibar leopard (Panthera pardus adersi), believed to be an extinct subspecies – a mounted specimen in the Zanzibar Museum

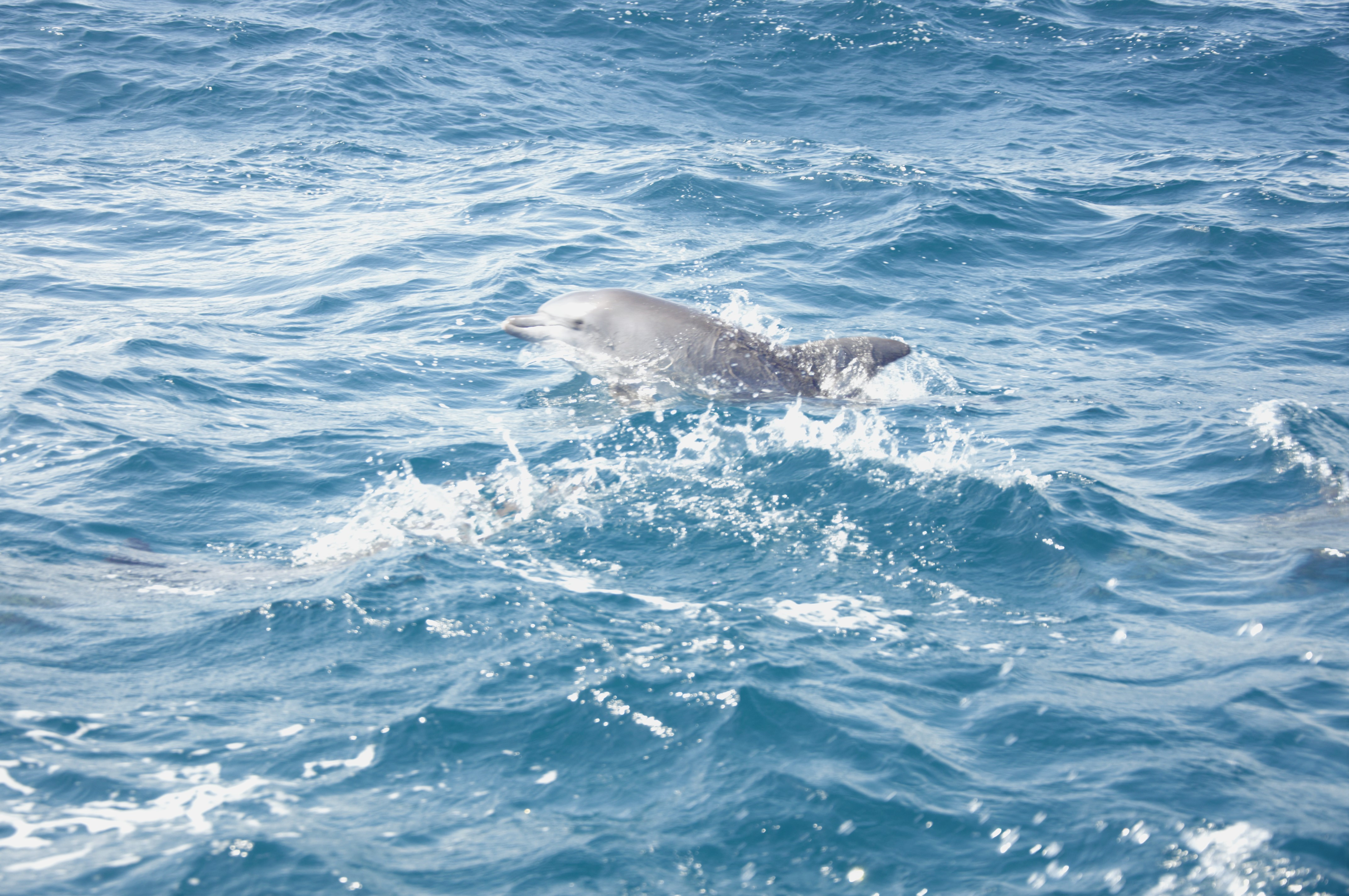
A dolphin in the Indian Ocean near Zanzibar

The wildlife of Zanzibar consists of terrestrial and marine flora and fauna in the archipelago of Zanzibar, an autonomous region of Tanzania. Its floral vegetation is categorized among the coastal forests of eastern Africa as the Southern Zanzibar-Inhambane coastal forest mosaic and the Northern Zanzibar-Inhambane coastal forest mosaic. Its faunal species are mostly small animals, birds, and butterflies.

The main island of Zanzibar, Unguja, has fauna which reflects its connection to the African mainland during the last ice age. The Zanzibar leopard, an endemic subspecies of the island that may now be extinct, is conjectured to have evolved after the island became separated from the mainland at Tanzania consequent to a rise of the sea level at the end of the ice age.

The laws applicable to the wildlife of Tanzania under the Tanzanian Wildlife Act also govern the flora and fauna of Zanzibar. Wild areas are protected in many reserves and Jozani Chwaka Bay National Park. The Zanzibar Forestry Development Project and Zanzibar Integrated Land Development Project are two important projects which address wildlife surveys and monitoring. The World Wildlife Fund (WWF) and IUCN are involved in many wildlife project related activities on the islands.

== Geography ==
Map of Zanzibar

The World Wildlife Fund divides the coastal forests into two ecoregions: the Northern Zanzibar-Inhambane coastal forest mosaic, which extends from southern Somalia through coastal Kenya to southern Tanzania, and includes the islands of Zanzibar and Pemba, and the Southern Zanzibar-Inhambane coastal forest mosaic, which extends from southern Tanzania along the Mozambique coast to the mouth of the Limpopo River. Natural habitats in this ecoregion have been largely replaced by areas under cultivation for food production and spices (cloves, cardamom, nutmeg, pepper, ginger and cardamom, grown mostly in Zanzibar and Pemba Island) for export. The remaining natural forest habitat is now located in the Jozani Chwaka bay region (southwest) and the Kiwenga forest in the northeast and the coral rag thicket.

The wildlife in the Zanzibar Archipelago is spread over Zanzibar's land area and also along the coastline. Some species are threatened or have become extinct due to indiscriminate hunting over the years. In Zanzibar, the only national park is Jozani Chwaka Bay National Park; there are also forest reserves, namely Ngezi Forest Reserve, Kiwengwa/Pongwe Forest Reserve, Kidike Root Site and Zala Park. Zanzibar's marine fauna reflects the rich marine diversity of East Africa. The parks devoted to the protection of Zanzibar's marine resources are Chumbe Marine Park, Mnemba Marine Park, Misali Marine Park, Menai Marine Park, Tumbatu Island, Chapwani Island and Changuu Island.

Climate

Temperatures recorded at Zanzibar town show a maximum of 33 °C (91 °F) recorded in March and minimum of 23 °C (73 °F) from July to September. Annual rainfall is 1,360 millimetres (54 in); it peaks in April and May at 310 and 290 millimetres (12 and 11 in), respectively, drops to 25 millimetres (0.98 in) in July and August, and recovers to 180 and 135 millimetres (7.1 and 5.3 in) in November and December.

== Protected areas ==
=== National park ===
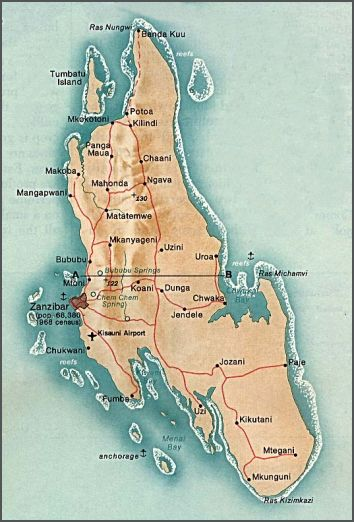
Jozani (centre-south) within Zanzibar

Jozani Chwaka Bay National Park (JCBNP) is the only national park in Zanzibar, covering an area of 50 square kilometres (19 sq mi), occupying the largest near-natural forest area on Zanzibar." It is in the island of Unguja. Habitats within the park and associated protected lands include groundwater forest, coastal forest, and grassland, with mangrove forest and salt marsh on the coast. The fa species found here are the Zanzibar red colobus (Piliocolobus kirkii), an endangered species (in the IUCN List) endemic monkey and the Aders's duiker; groups of the colobus monkeys are seen close to the park. Wading birds are recorded in the marshy areas along with seaweed. The coral rag in the park is the earliest settlement, which was exploited for agricultural development due to population pressure. However, with help from the government of Australia and CARE Tanzania, government of Zanzibar established the Jozani Chwaka Bay Conservation Project, in 1995. Zanzibar's first national park's maintenance is partly met from the revenue generated from entry fee charged on visitors to the park. This fee is also shared with the Jozani Conservation Society used to construct and operate schools and health clinics for local villages. The park has created many trails through the forest to watch birds and also an elevated board-walk to see the mangrove forest.

=== Wildlife reserves ===
Ngezi forest reserve

Ngezi Forest Reserve covers an area of 14.4 square kilometres (5.6 sq mi) and is in the northwestern tip of Pemba Island. It was declared a reserve in 1950 after most of the area had been denuded for cultivation of cloves. It still has high closed forest known as Ngezi forest extending right up to the beach at Vumawimbi. The forest types reported consist of coral bushes and thickets, thick grasses and bushes in the sandy-loam soils and Mtifutifu soils; dominant plant species are: Odyendea zimmermanni (mjoho), riverine forest of Barringtonia racemosa (mtomondo), Milicia excelsa (mvule), Alexandrian laurel (mtondoo), Erythrophleum spp. (mwavi), Antiarus spp. (mgulele), Chrisalidocarpus pembanus (mpapindi) and Terminalia catappa (mkungu), and mangrove forest. Avifauna recorded consists of 27 bird species in the forest, out of which the endemic species are hadada, the African goshawk, the palm-nut vulture, scops owl, the malachite kingfisher and the Pemba white-eye. Other faunal species consist of Pemba flying fox (large fruit-eating bat), the Pemba vervet monkey, the Zanzibar red colobus monkey, hyrax, Pemba blue duiker (an antelope about the size of a hare), feral pigs (introduced by the Portuguese), the Javan civet cat (introduced by southeast Asian traders for the production of musk) and marsh mongoose (an endemic carnivore).

Kiwengwa/Pongwe Forest Reserve

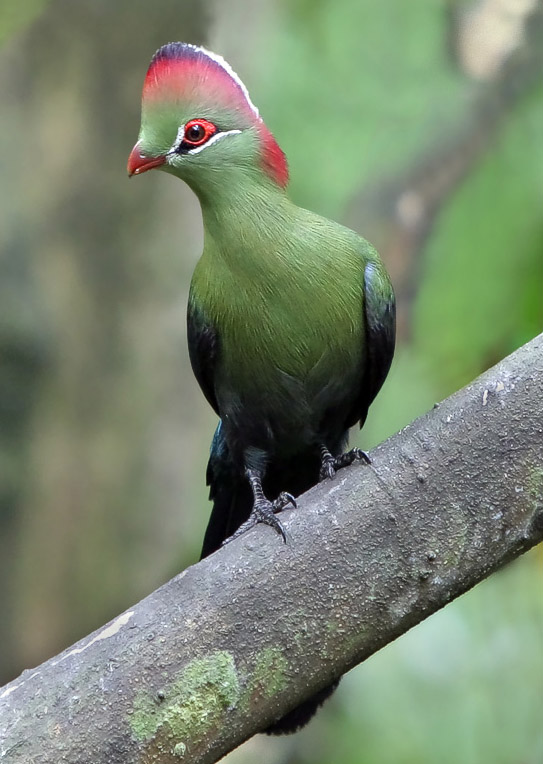
Fischer's turaco

Kiwengwa/Pongwe Forest Reserve is located on the northeast coast of Unguja, 20 kilometres (12 mi) from the Zanzibar Town. The reserve is an important biodiversity spot in the coral rag zone. The forest reserve is rich both in faunal and floral species. The faunal species reported from the reserve are: Endemic species of red colobus monkey, Aders' duiker, sykes, blue monkeys, suni antelope and several species of snakes. The avifauna species consist of 47 bird species, which includes Fischer's turaco, Zanzibar sombre greenbul, crowned hornbill and white-browed coucal. There are 100 plant species which includes many medicinal species. There are also coral caves within the reserve where stalactites and stalagmite formations can be seen. There is also a spice plantation near the reserve. Coral rag forest, a sensitive ecosystem, is under threat due to timber extraction, since the 1970s. Conservation measures have been undertaken to preserve the rich biodiversity of the reserve.

Kidike Root Site

Kidike Root Site is in the central part of Pemba Island. It has the endangered Pemba flying fox, considered the largest bat species in the world. Other animals in the island are the vervet monkeys, Mozambique cobras, tortoises, bush crabs, red eyed doves and mangrove king fishers. It is located close to Chake.

Zala Park

Zanzibar Land Animals and the Park (ZALA) is a small reserve located about 5 kilometres (3 mi) from the Jozani National Park. It is where many animals could be seen in captivity. The park was developed by the park's ranger with the objective of educating local children about preserving endangered species and the need for their preservation. The animal species are big pythons, chameleons, geckos, tortoises, crabs, dik-dik (mini gazelle-like animals), striped lizards, monitor lizards and hyrax (looks like a rabbit without ears and is one of the closest living relatives of the elephant). The reserve is set amidst rich vegetation of trees such as orange, lime, grapefruit, nutmeg, banana, ginger, chillies, black pepper and cinnamon.

=== Marine parks ===
Zanzibar has many marine parks, which are protected for their biodiversity. These are Chumbe Marine Park, Mnemba Marine Park, Misali Marine Park, Menai Marine Park, Tumbatu Island, Chapwani Island, and Changuu Island.

Chumbe Marine Park

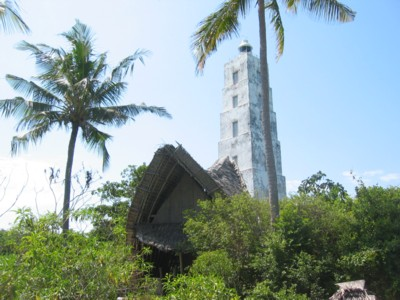
Chumbe island coastal forest and beach

Chumbe Marine Park, recognized officially as Chumbe Reef Sanctuary since 1994, is privately managed and is successful as an ecotourism project. The objective of this sanctuary is to preserve and develop the rich biodiversity of the coral reef. Set up after a controversial debate over a period of three years between the private developer of the park, the government and the local fishermen, the sanctuary has received funds from the European Union, Gesellschaft für Technische Zusammenarbeit (the German aid agency) and many other donors, including the initial developer. The sanctuary offers a terrestrial nature trail and an “Eco-lodge” for accommodation as well as an education centre. In particular, among the many awards it has received, the important ones are the "UNEP Global 500 Award for Environmental Achievement" and the British Airways Tourism for Tomorrow Southern Regional and Global Awards.

Mnemba Marine Park

Mnemba Marine Park is located 10 kilometres (6 mi) from Stone Town and forms part of the northeastern Unguja Island. A marine reserve and atoll, its shallow stretch of coral reef is in the shape of an oval. It is located between Matemwe and Nungwi, which is an important ecological and economic asset. The area, which was earlier accessible to local fishermen, is now under 33-year renewable lease hold with "CC Africa" who have made it an exclusive island for "high-end tourism". However, part of the park has been declared recently as a "no touch" zone called the "House Reef" to ensure recovery of corals to good shape. The park has many aquatic and plant species. Green turtles, which are on the endangered list, nestle here in large numbers.

Misali Marine Park

Misali Marine Park is part of the Pemba Channel Conservation Area, which covers 21.58 square kilometres (8.33 sq mi), including a 9.4-kilometre (5.8 mi) ring of coral that surrounds Misali Island. The Misali Island area represents a reef ecosystem with high biodiversity and socio-economic value. The island's fringing reef has 42 hard coral genera and over 400 fish species, including the endangered humphead. The reef is also a source for larvae due to its closeness to the Pemba Channel that separates the islands from the mainland Tanzania. It provides for fishing as livelihood for the twenty Pemba communities who fish in these waters. There is a profusion of sea urchins indicative of finfish fisheries that provides economic avenue to 7,000 Pemba people. Its history has many events of interest namely, as a pirate hideaway in the 17th century and for the hidden treasures of Captain Kidd.

Menai Marine Park

Menai Marine Park with marine and coastal area is located on the southwest of Unguja Island. It has abundant tropical fish species, sea grasses and coral reefs. Mangrove forests are seen in many small islets. The aquatic species reported are moray eels, scorpion fish, lion fish, large groupers, octopuses, lobsters, rays, manta rays, whale sharks, sea turtles, various dolphins,sperm whales and humpback whales. Its underwater cliffs, wrecks, canyons, caves and spectacular reefs are popular diving and snorkelling sites. The Menai Marine Park ecosystem is a protected marine conservation area which covers 470 square kilometres (180 sq mi). A marine reserve management plan has been developed with participation of the local communities.

Tumbatu Island

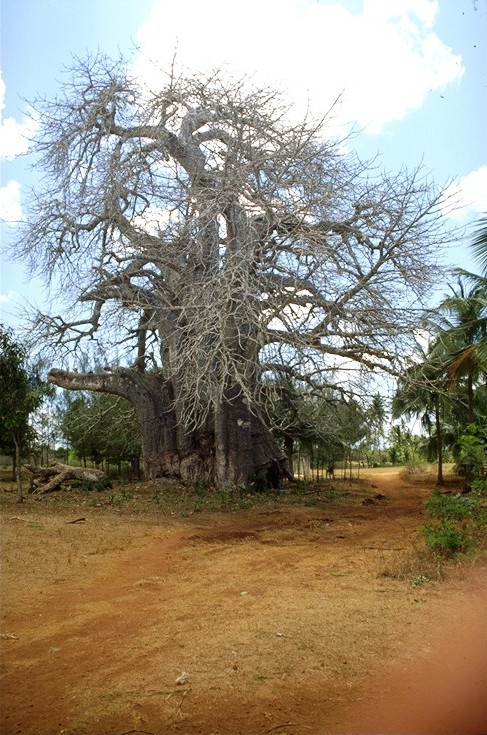
Baobab tree on Tumbatu Island

Tumbatu Island is part of the northwest coast of Zanzibar. This tiny island was once the capital of Zanzibar during the reign of the Sultan of Shiraz. The proud people of the island trace their ancestry to the Shiraz rulers of Persia who came to the island in the 10th century. The island is shaped like a long, thin dagger. Vegetation on the island consists of very large baobab trees. The island's coast line is reef-fringed with coral reefs studded with multicoloured fish. The island has a large number of the Zanzibar suni (Nesotragus moschatus) called pa, on the coral rag on the east coast, duiker (Cepholophus adersi) locally called the paanunga and Dendrohyrax neumanni. An important bird species is Guinea fowl. Jongowe village on the island has a population concentration as well as a large number of mosque remnants and a group of 40 stone houses, within an area of 25 hectares (62 acres) all traced to the 14th century. Mosque ruins and some stone houses built in the 12th century by the Shiraz people are also still seen here. It is popular for sightseeing, sports fishing and scuba diving.

Chapwani Island

Chapwani Island, 600 by 60 metres (1,970 ft × 200 ft) in size, is under private ownership, and has white sand beaches on one side, surrounded by lush vegetation and many coral inlets with swimming pools on the other side. The island boasts more of history than wildlife. Fauna seen is mostly dik dik antelopes. It is 3 kilometres (2 mi) north of Stone Town. It was formerly known as the French Island. It is also called as the Grave Island, named after the small naval cemetery and the tombs of colonial-era British seamen at its southern end, dated to 1879. The cemetery was specially built in 1879 by Sultan Barghash for the burial of English people of the Royal and Merchant Navies. British sailors killed during the battle between HMS Pegasus and the German cruiser Koningsberg in 1914 are buried here. It is about 4 kilometres (2 mi) north of Zanzibar Town. Potable water is supplied from Zanzibar. As it is privately owned, stay on the island is allowed by booking rooms on the only lodge on the island or on a day visit only by buying a meal ticket.

Changuu Island

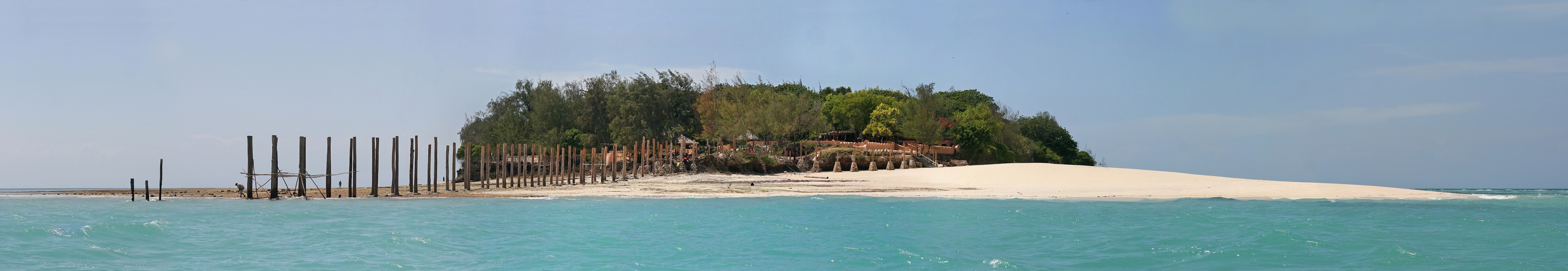
Prison Island or Changuu Island

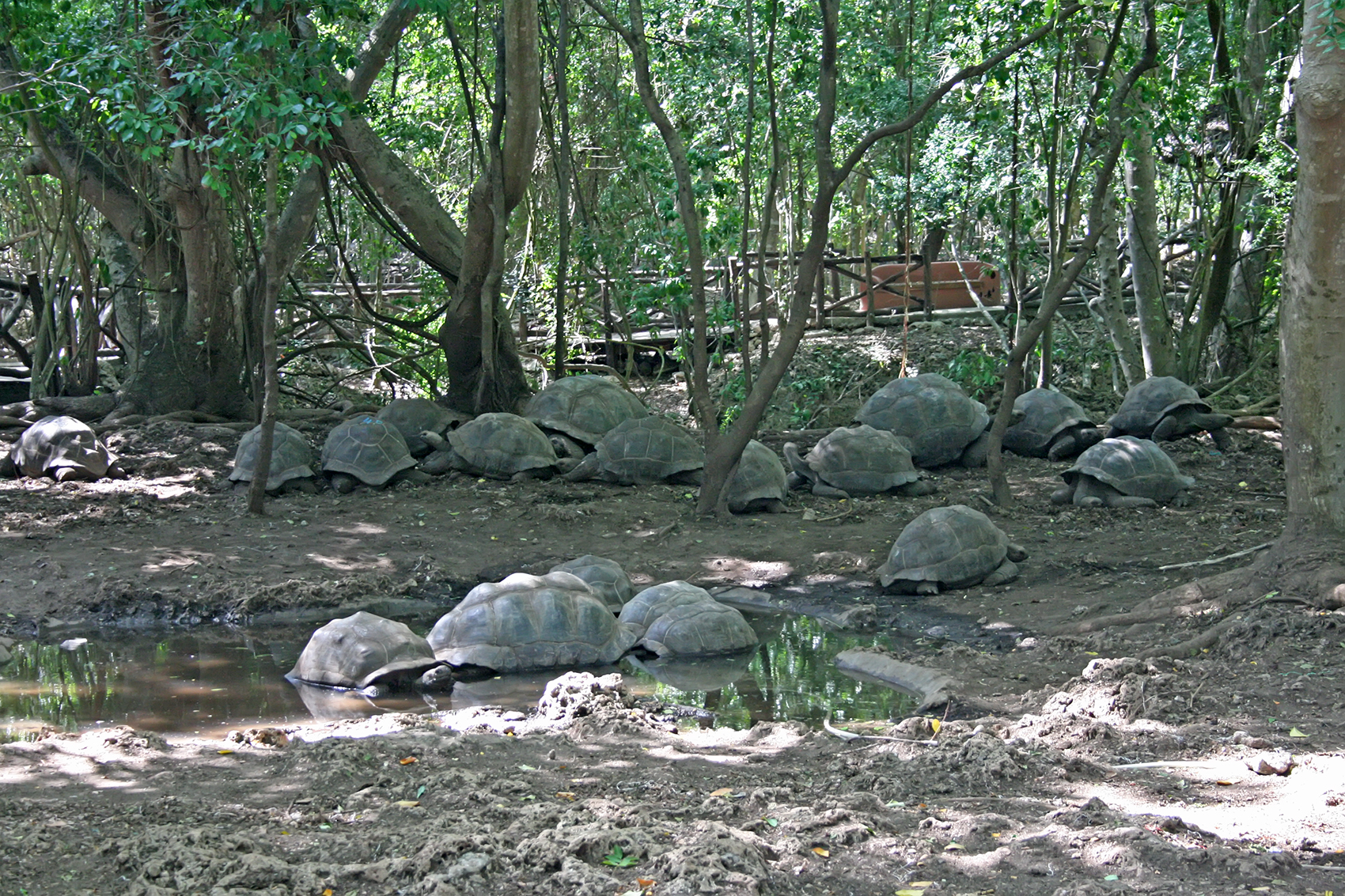
Aldabra giant tortoises on Changuu Island

Changuu Island (or Prison Island), 5 kilometres (3 mi) to the northwest of Stone Town, has coral rag forest. It is home to the giant tortoises called changuu in Kishwahili language, from which the island gets its name. The island is approachable by boat from Forodhani, the main port of Zanzibar. In the past, Arab slave traders used this island to keep troublesome slaves of the African mainland for auctioning in Zanzibar's slave market. Even though it is called a Prison Island, in fact there was no prison at any time but only a yellow fever quarantine camp or slave transit camp existed here. A trail behind this camp, which is seen only in ruins, leads to a small forest area where a herd of suni antelopes is reported. Tortoises are also housed in a sanctuary here behind a restaurant. The tortoises were imported from Aldabra Atoll in the Seychelles in the late 19th century; they weigh about 100 kilograms (220 lb) on an average, and some of them are as old as 100 years. There is good bird life; the most prominently sighted are weavers whose nests can be seen hanging from branches of trees.

== Flora ==
Natural habitats have been largely replaced by cultivated areas for food production and spices (cloves, nutmeg, pepper, ginger and cardamom grown mostly in Zanzibar and Pemba Islands) for exports, consequent to population expansion of over 2000 years of anthropological expansion. The remaining natural habitats can be found in Jozani Chwaka bay region (southwest) and the Kiwenga forest in the northeast and the coral rag thicket. Other reasons for wildlife being threatened or extinct are also attributed to indiscriminate hunting over the years. Coconut palms are amongst the most important trees.

== Fauna ==
The faunal species, both terrestrial and marine species, are found in the islands of Zanzibar; marine fauna found are mostly dolphins and whales. The details are:

=== Mammals ===
The 54 terrestrial mammals found in Zanzibar include 23 species of bats (popo in Swahili). Other species are: the Bushy-tailed mongoose (local name chongwe), which is found in the coral rag forest of the southeastern coast of Unguja and in the deep soil region on the western part of Pemba Island; the small blue duiker; suni (mammalian) or dwarf antelope (just 15 in or 380 mm tall); African and small Indian civet. The Zanzibar red colobus has been known to consume charcoal, possibly a learned behaviour, after eating the leaves of the Indian almond tree and Mangifera indica mango. Along with small animals, Zanzibar is known for several oversized species, such as the giant rat (Cricetomys gambianus cosensi) which can be up to a metre (3 ft) long with the tail. The dugong, an internationally endangered species, still occurs in the region.

=== Birds ===
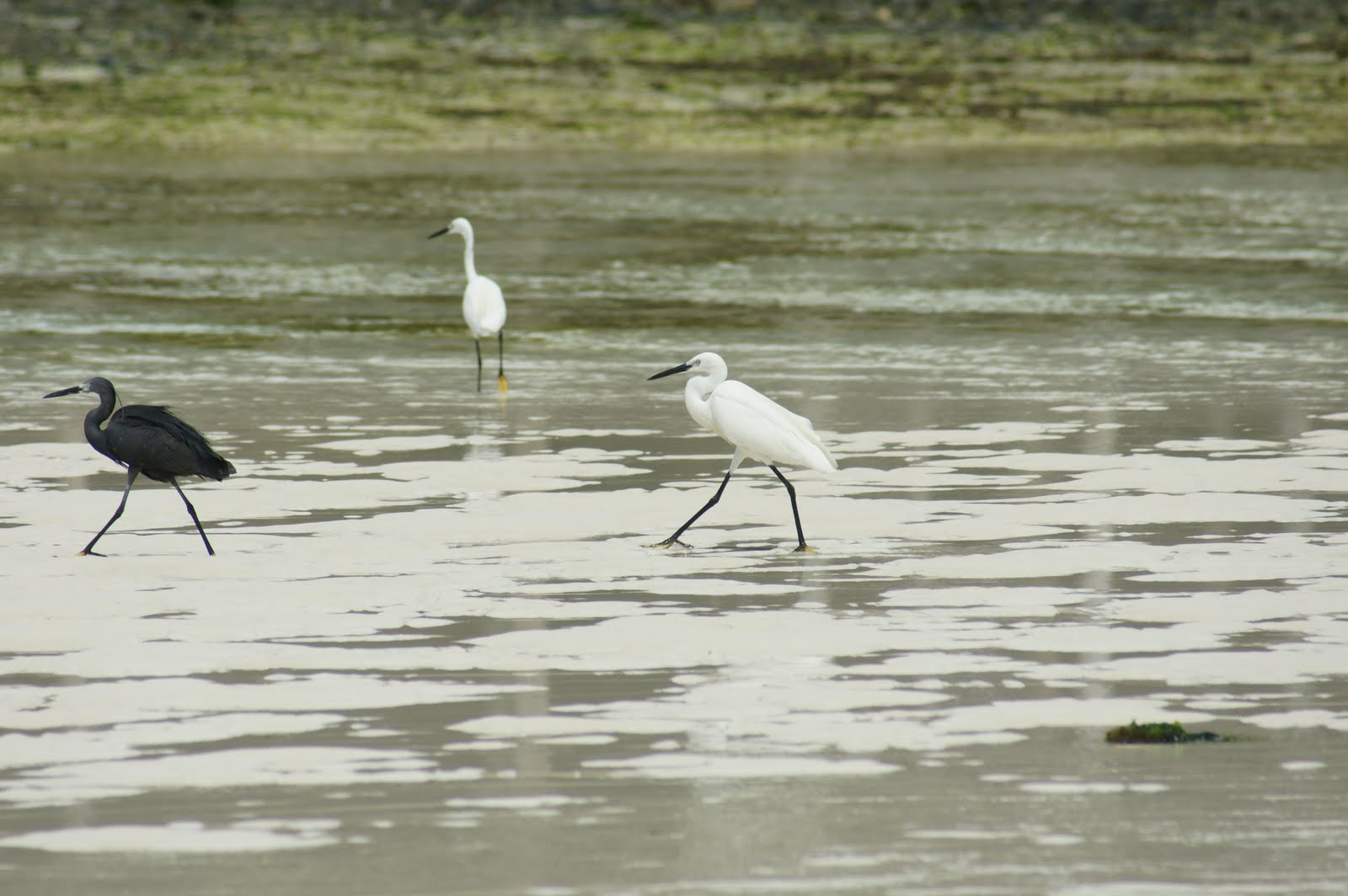
Egretta garzetta, little egret, in Zanzibar

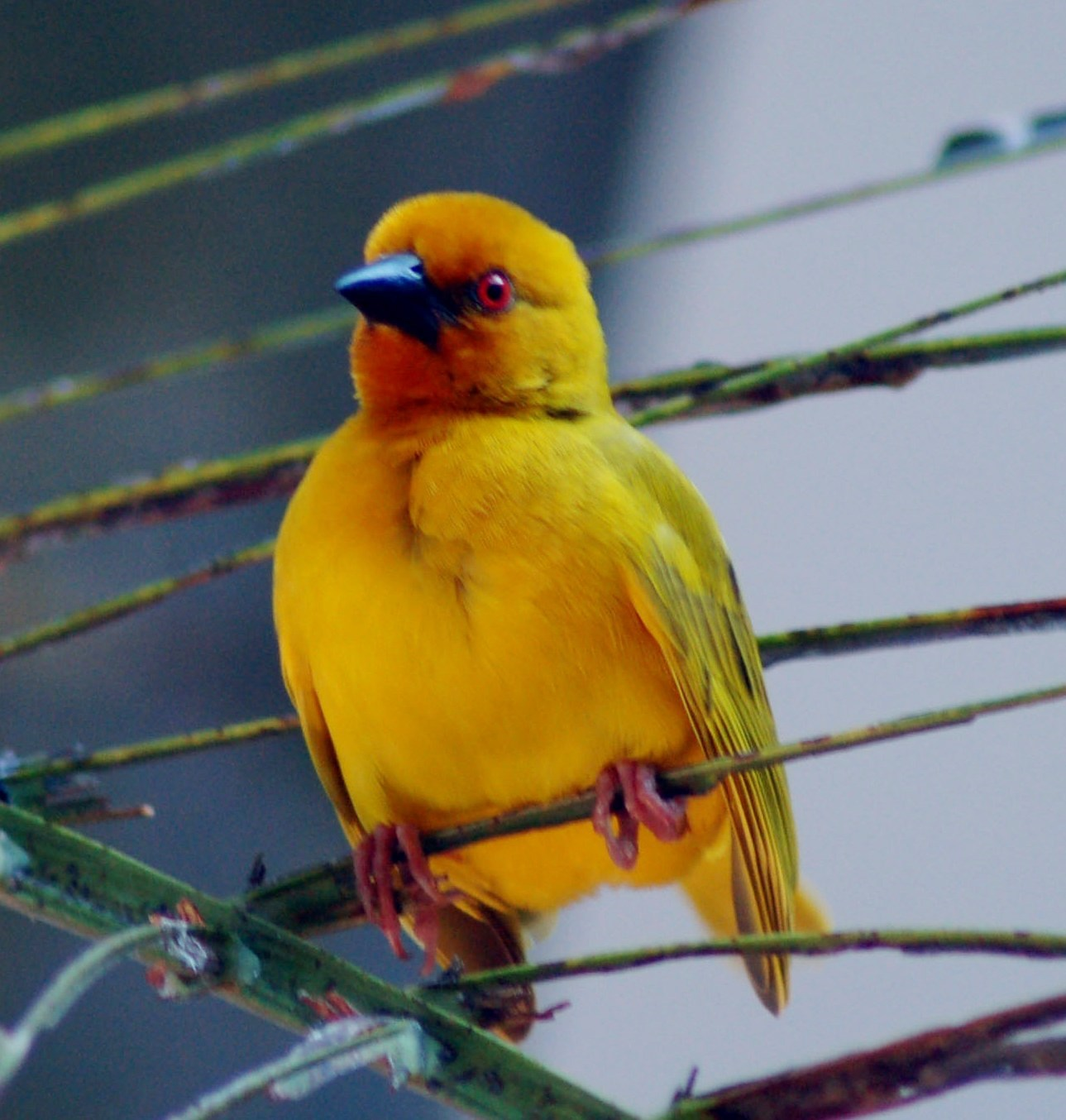
Ploceus subaureus (eastern golden weaver)

Birds found in Zanzibar including Pemba Island and Mafia Island (not governed by the semi-autonomous region of Zanzibar), are about 240 species of which: globally threatened species are four, introduced species is one and endemics are eight. The genera of the birds and some of the details of extirpated, introduced, vulnerable and threatened spices are given below.

Family of two of Numididae; three Phasianidae including one extirpated species of crested francolin (Ortygornis sephaena); four of Anatidae; one Podicipedidae; one Phoenicopteridae; two of Ciconiidae; two of Threskiornithidae; 13 of Ardeidae; one Sulidae; one Phalacrocoracidae; one Falconidae; eight Accipitridae; five Rallidae; one Turnicidae; one Burhinidae; one Dromadidae; four Charadriidae; one Rostratulidae; one Jacanidae; six Scolopacidae; five Laridae; ten Columbidae includes two introduced species of laughing dove (Spilopelia senegalensis) and Namaqua dove (Oena capensis), and one Pemba green pigeon (Treron pembaensis), an endemic and vulnerable species; three of family Psittacidae includes two introduced species of rose-ringed parakeet (Psittacula krameri) and grey-headed lovebird (Agapornis canus); one Musophagidae with a near-threatened species of Fischer's turaco (Tauraco fischeri); three of family Cuculidae; one of Tytonidae; three of Strigidae including one vulnerable species of Pemba scops owl (Otus pembaensis); one Caprimulgidae; five Apodidae; one Coliidae of the extirpated species of speckled mousebird (Colius striatus); one Trogonidae; two Coraciidae; six of Alcedinidae; one of Meropidae; two of Phoeniculidae; two of Picidae; three of Malaconotidae; one of Campephagidae; one of Oriolidae; one of Dicruridae; two of Monarchidae; two of family Corvidae including one introduced species of house crow (Corvus splendens); four of Hirundinidae; three of Cisticolidae; three of Pycnonotidae; one of genera incertae sedis; two of Sylviidae; one of Timaliidae; one of Zosteropidae, Pemba white-eye (Zosterops vaughani); three of Sturnidae; one of Turdidae; five of Muscicapidae; seven of Nectariniidae; two of Passeridae; seven of Ploceidae; ten of Estrildidae including one introduced species of blue-breasted cordon-bleu (Uraeginthus angolensis) and vulnerable and introduced species of Java sparrow (Padda oryzivora); two Viduidae; one Motacillidae; and one Fringillidae.

Some of the prominent bird species are tropical finches on Unguja Island's east coast, endemic sun birds on Pemba Island, the Pemba scops owl that lives on clove trees.

=== Invertebrates ===
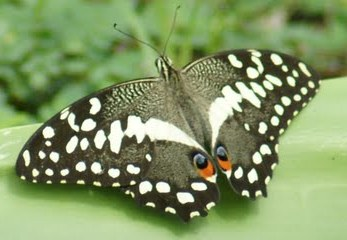
Papilio demodocus in Zanzibar, Nungwi

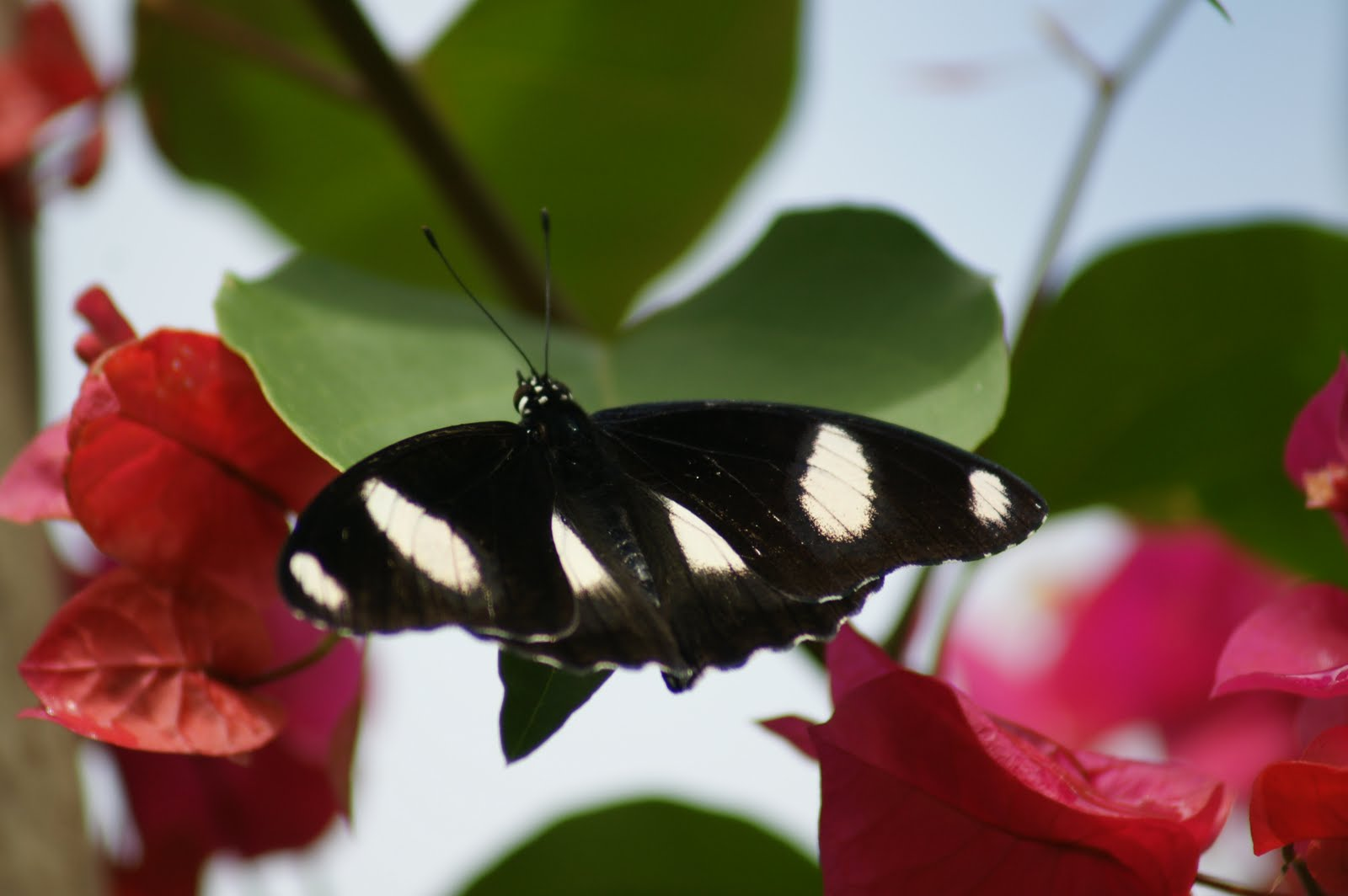
Widespread species of the Danaid eggfly (Hypolimnas misippus), nymphalid butterfly in Nungwi.

The islands of Zanzibar have a large number of butterflies. Pete village, has the Zanzibar Butterfly Centre (ZBC), which was established in 2008. At this centre, local butter fly species are farmed for which training on the knowledge of their botanical and natural habitats are provided to a large number of farmers. This enables farmers to have additional avenues for income generation. The farmers have also established a "Farmers Council" to interact and disseminate the knowledge acquired, to other farmers. The farming involves creating a small netted enclosure with food plants placed in it to attract butterflies. Out of the butterflies caught in the netted enclosure, the female species are segregated into another breeding cage where they lay eggs, which are then kept in a pest free box to hatch caterpillars or larva. The hatching process takes about two weeks. Following the hatching, they are allowed to pupate on the underside of selected leaves, which again takes about two weeks. The pupae are then sold by the farmers, after retaining some stock for further regeneration in the cages. This project has been assisted by the Critical Ecosystem Partnership Fund. The ZBC works in close association with Jozani Chwaka Bay National Park, Jozani Environmental Conservation Association (JECA) and Pete Development Association (PDA). The butterfly known as the "flying handkerchief" can be seen in this village. However, bigger and larger butterflies are seen in the wild.

The coconut crab, a crustacean which climbs up palm trees and break the shells with its huge claws (called locally as tuu) is found mostly in Pemba Island. This endangered species inhabits the reserved areas of coral rag forest. Giant millipedes are seen all over the forest land, and a giant land snail (Achatina reticulata) measures more than 15 centimetres (6 in) in length.

== Conservation ==
A Community Based Forest Management and Socioeconomic Development Project was undertaken, from 1 January 2006 to 31 December 2007, around the only national park in Zanzibar for the conservation of its unique flora and fauna. The project was a joint effort of the Zanzibar Department of Commercial Crops, Fruits and Forestry (DCCFF), Wildlife Conservation Society (WCS), CARE International in Tanzania, the Jozani Environmental Conservation Association (JECA), the Jozani Community Development Organization (JOCDO), Zanzibar Beekeeping Association (ZABA) and the Menai Bay Conservation Project (WWF funded project) under the CEPF grant. This was a follow-up project of the earlier conservation project which was undertaken between 1995 and 2003 in nine core villages of the same park. The objectives of this second project, based on lessons learned from the first project, aimed "at enhancing forest and wildlife conservation through resource governance practices, livelihood improvement, accurate data of wildlife and building capacity of community organizations and the Department of Commercial Crops, Fruits and Forestry."

The Tanzanian Department of Commercial Crops and Forestry has the task of forest conservation while marine parks are under the control of the Department of Fisheries and Marine Resources. A protected area network has also been established recently which is in the process of expansion. Conservation efforts are on to preserve red colobus and the Aders' duiker (presently unprotected in farmlands).

== Gallery ==
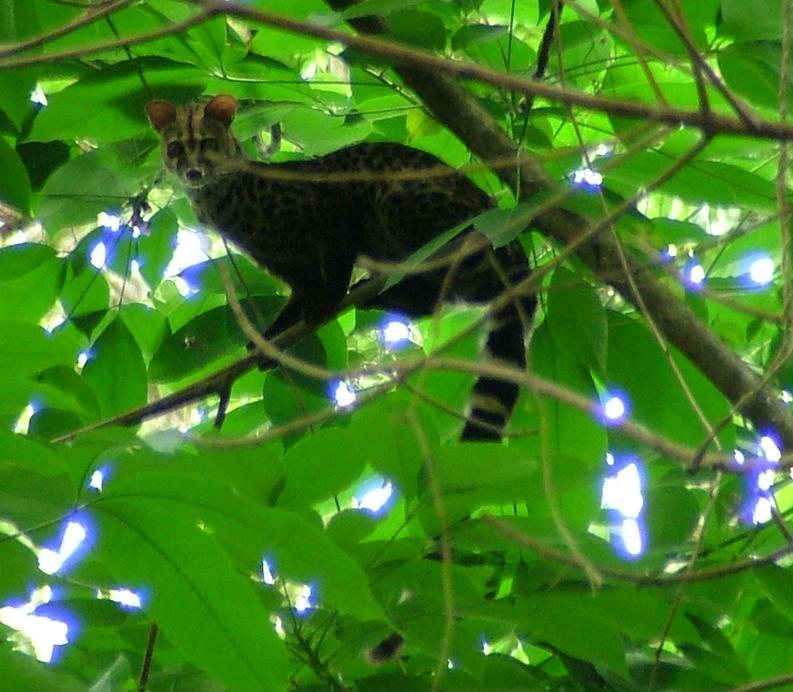
Servaline genet

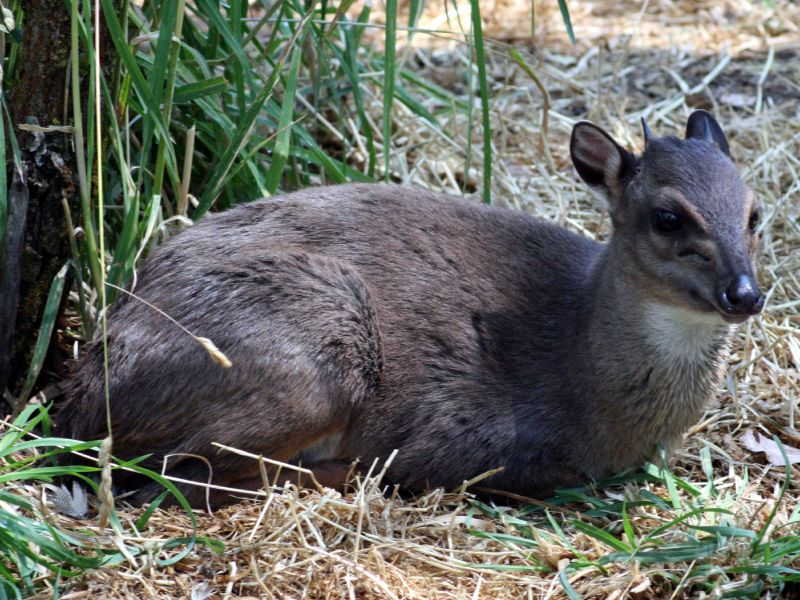
Blue duiker

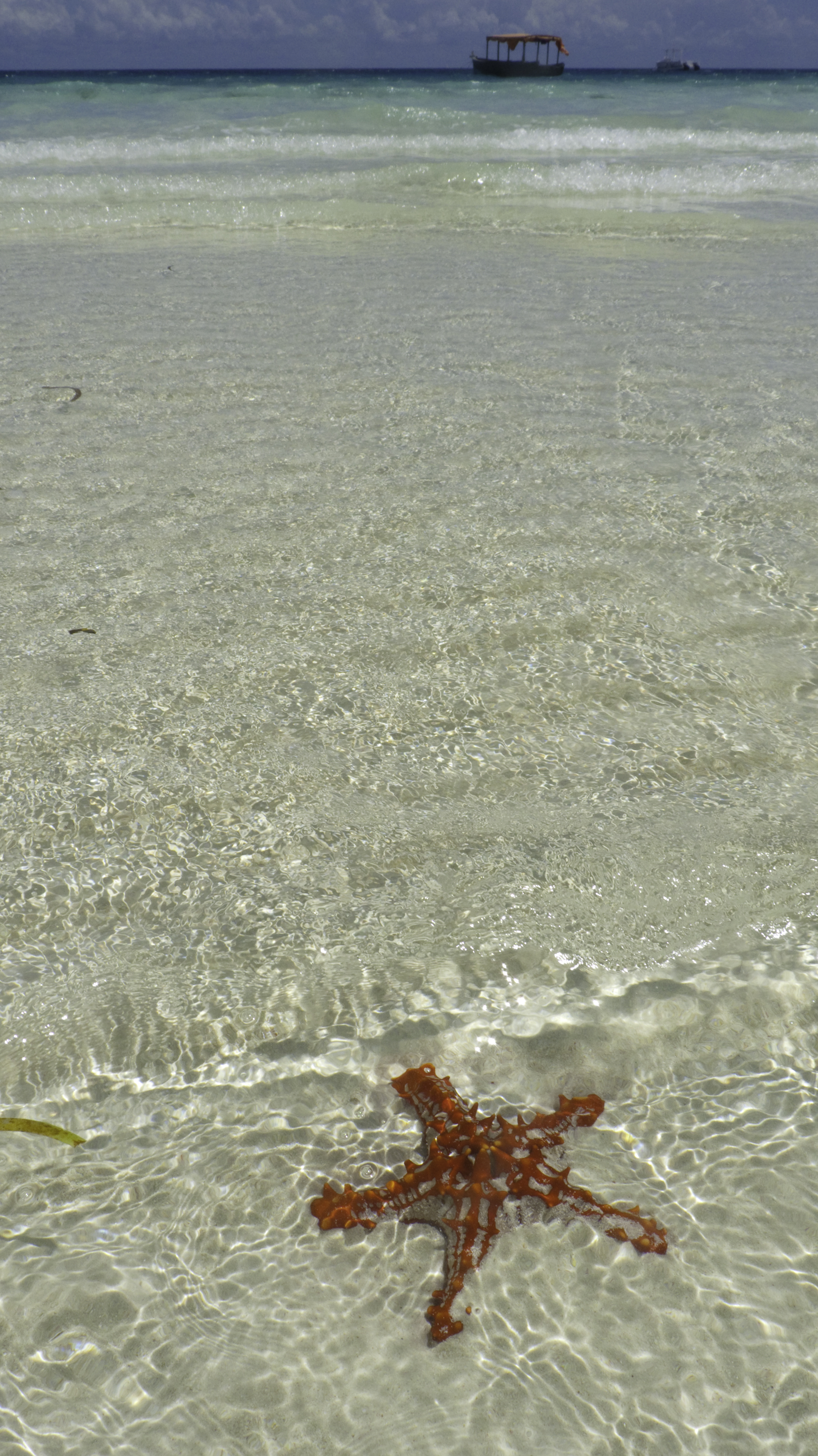
A red-knobbed starfish on the beach of Nungwi

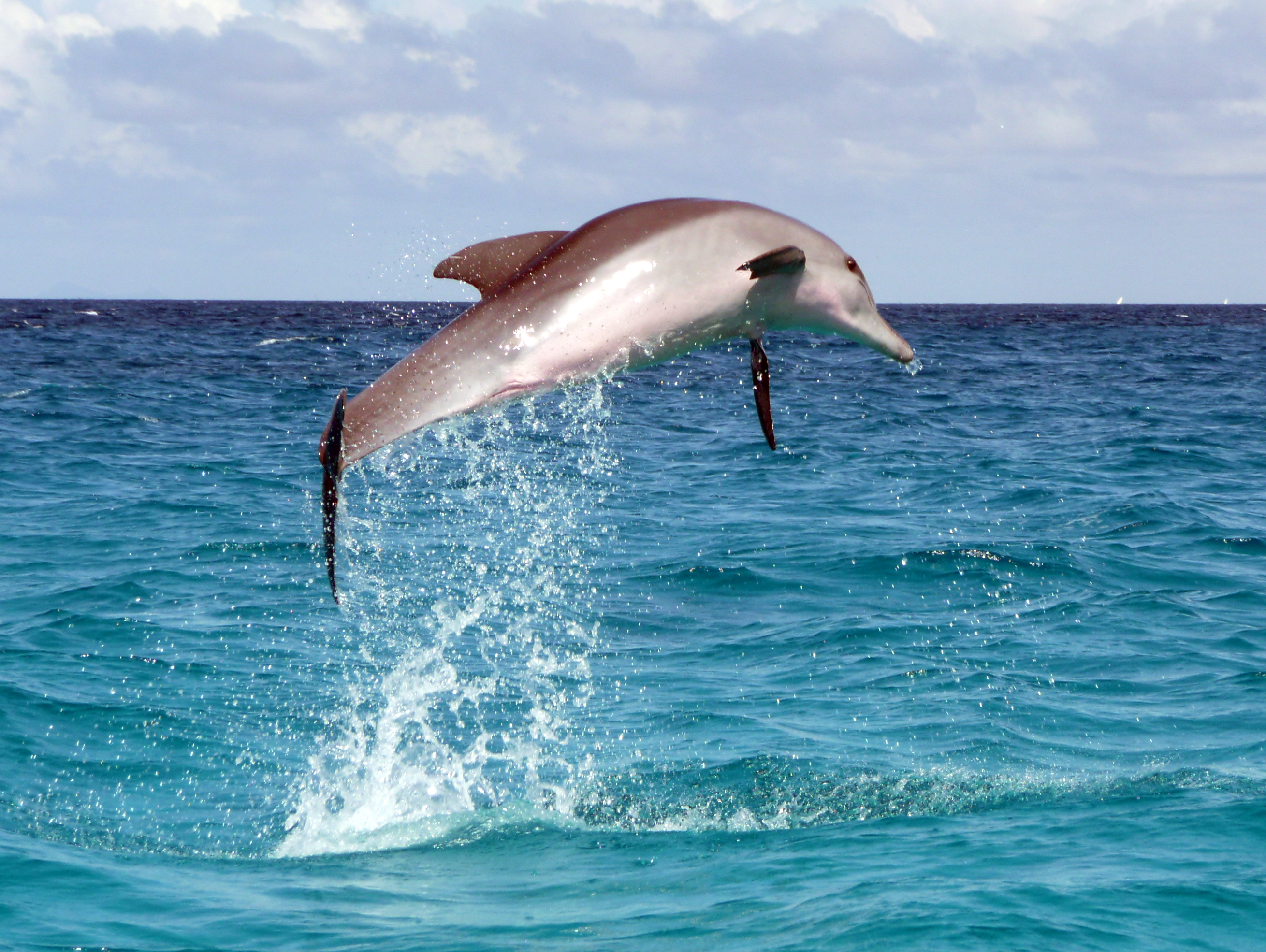
A dolphin in the Indian Ocean, off the coast of Zanzibar

== See also ==
- List of protected areas of Tanzania
- List of national parks of Tanzania
- Marine parks of Tanzania
- Marine reserves of Tanzania
