= Tourism in Zanzibar =

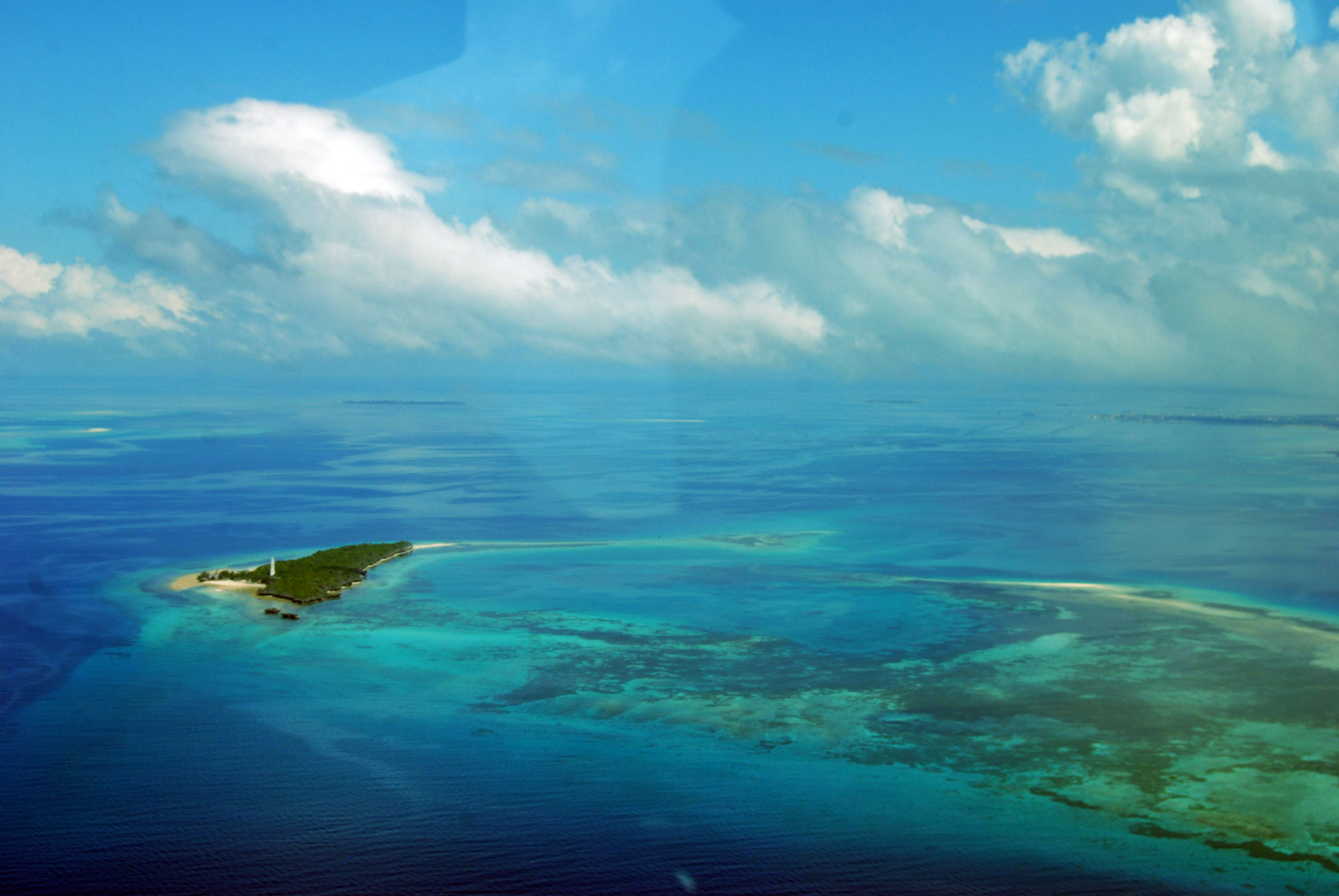
The coastline of Zanzibar

Tourism in Zanzibar includes the tourism industry and its effects on the islands of Unguja (known internationally as Zanzibar) and Pemba in Zanzibar a semi-autonomous region in the United Republic of Tanzania. Tourism is the top income generator for the islands, outpacing even the lucrative agricultural export industry and providing roughly 25% of income. The main airport on the island is Zanzibar International Airport, though many tourists fly into Dar es Salaam and take a ferry to the island.

The Government of Zanzibar plays a major role in promoting the industry. Zanzibar Commission for Tourism recorded more than doubling the number of tourists from the 2015/2016 fiscal year and the following year, from 162,242 to 376,000.

The increase in tourism has led to significant environmental impacts and mixed impacts on local communities, which were expected to benefit from economic development but in large part have not. Communities have witnessed increasing environmental degradation, and that flow of tourists has reduced the access of local communities to the marine and coastal resources that are the center of tourist activity.

== History ==
The opportunity to develop a tourism industry in Zanzibar first arose in the 1980s, before which point tourism effectively did not exist. As of 1985 there were only 19,000 annual tourists. Restructuring of the economy in the 1980s due to the Investment Protection Act instituted at the behest of the International Monetary Fund allowed for an expansion of local business engaged in the industry. Increased growth in FDI-based accommodations and hotels on the islands has allowed for growth in tourism from Italy, the UK, other parts of Europe and Africa.

In 2011 and 2012, two tourist ferries sank near the islands.

Following shutdowns due to the COVID-19 pandemic, Zanzibar reopened the islands in June 2020 without quarantine measures. In late 2020, the government promoted confidence in the tourism industry in Zanzibar and saw a partial recovery of 60% of the number of inbound tourists that it had seen in previous years by November.

In 2024, the number of international arrivals reached a record high of nearly 737,000, a 15.4% increase from 2023. By then, tourism accounted for almost a third of Zanzibar's overall GDP.

== Government activity ==
The tourism in the region is promoted both by the Zanzibar Commission for Tourism Authority and Tanzania Tourist Board. The semi-autonomous nature of Zanzibar makes analysis of the situation more similar to Small Island Developing States. A 2014 study found that the planning, policy and governance practices for the local tourism industry were poor. Moreover, widespread corruption has led to government officials protecting investors and hotel owners, many of whom are not local parts of the economy.

== Attractions ==
The principal grouping of attractions on Zanzibar are coastal tourism, terrestrial wildlife, dhow cruising and spice tours.

=== Stone Town ===
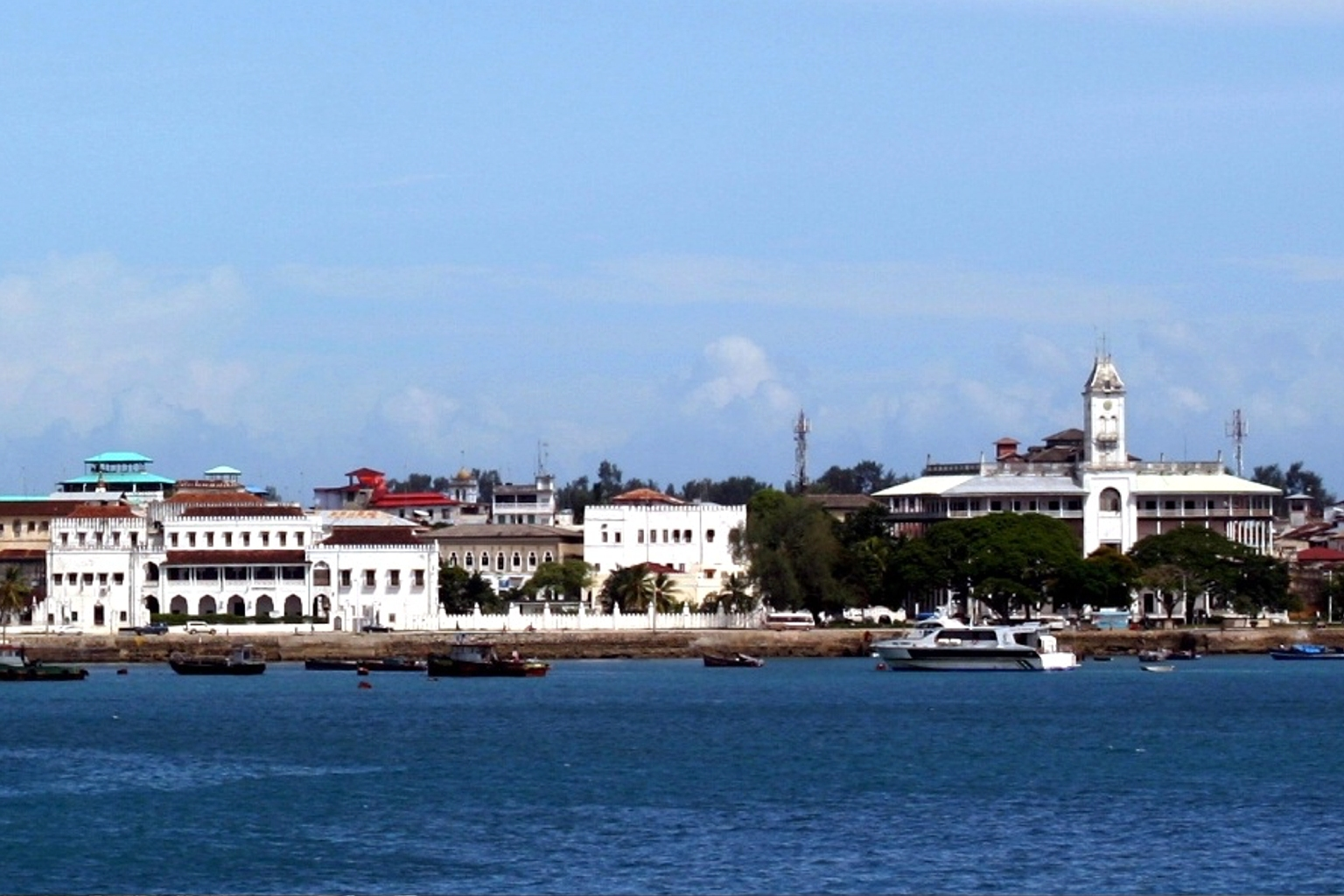
View of Stone Town

Zanzibar's capital is the historical Stone Town, home to much of Zanzibar's tourism industry. It is also a World Heritage Site. The town contains numerous historical and cultural sites, including Makusurani graveyard (where many of the islands' previous Arab rulers are buried), House of Wonders (a four-story building which was the first place on the islands with electrical lights), Hamamni and Kidichi Persian Baths (the first public baths on the island), Dunga Ruins (ruins of a palace built in the 15th century by the rulers of the time), and the Peace Memorial Museum, a national historical museum detailing the island's long history.

=== Coastal tourism ===
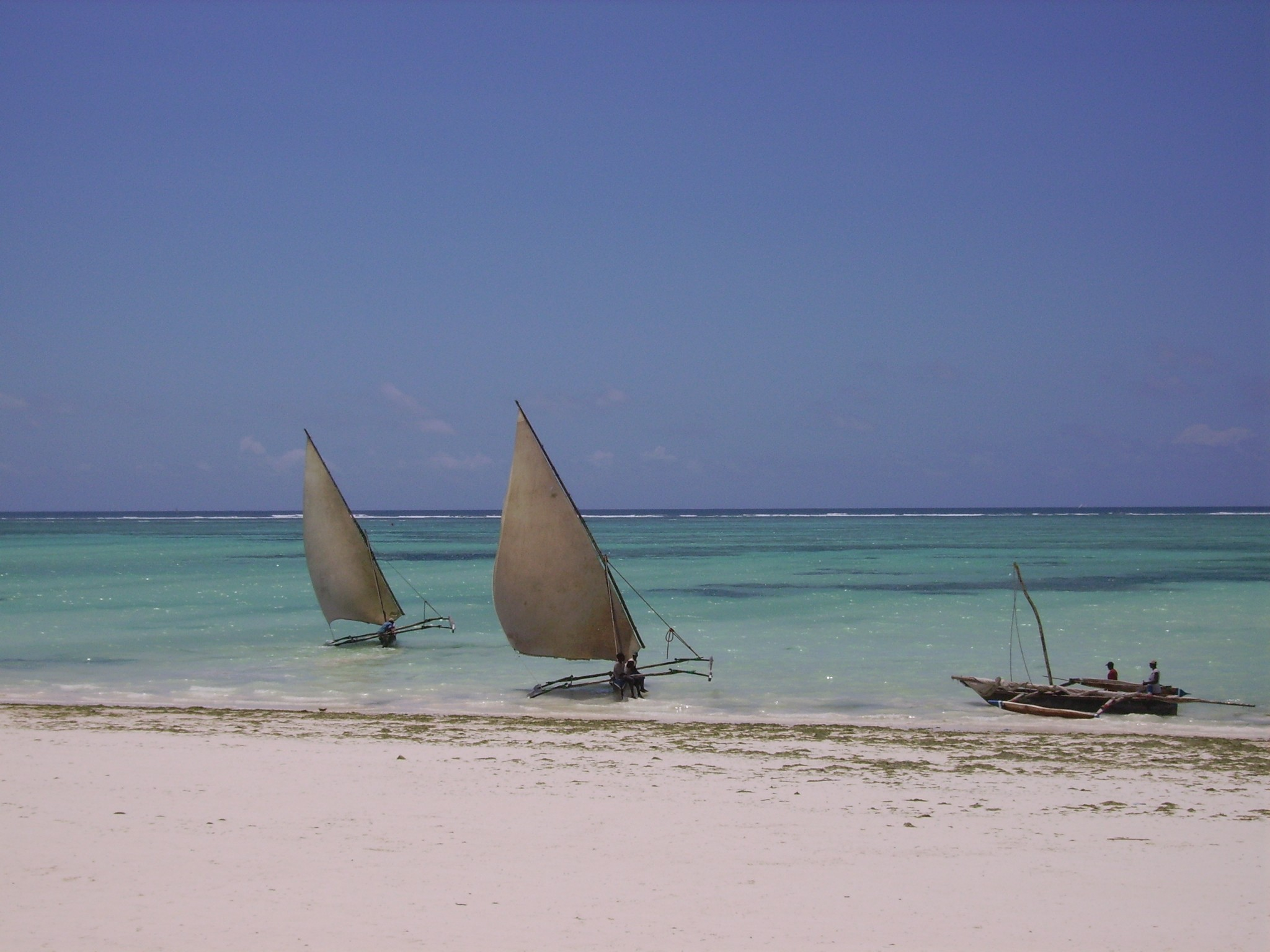
A beach on Zanzibar

Zanzibar is home to large numbers of beaches and clear Indian Ocean water, as well as coral and limestone scarps which allow for significant amounts of diving and snorkeling. The diving and snorkeling are done in marine parks. The aquatic life seen includes dolphins, moray eels, lion fish, octopus and lobster. Tourists may also go dhow cruising around the small islands. They can view the sunset and have refreshments on board. Some of these marine spaces are providing important ecosystem preservation, such as Chumbe Marine Park.

=== Spice tour ===
The town is famous for its spice tours. Tourists visit the various coconut and spice plantations in the island. Zanzibar is known for its variety of spices that are used to prepare food, cosmetics and medicines. Some of the fruits available include banana, coconut, lime, jackfruit and breadfruit. Spices include clove, nutmeg, black pepper, vanilla and coriander. Zanzibar is also known for its salt and seaweed farms that may be visited by tourists on request.

=== Jozani forest and Kidike root site ===
The Jozani forest is located in the central east region of Zanzibar consisting of a large mangrove swamp. The forest is home to the rare Zanzibar red colobus monkey. The forest is also home to 40 species of bird and 50 species of butterfly. The Kidike root site is a great place to view the endangered Pemba flying fox.

== Statistics ==
=== Arrivals by country ===
Foreign tourist arrivals in Zanzibar by nationality (2022–2025)
Rank	Nationality	2025	2024	2023	2022
1	Italy	104,280	87,202	67,584	36,928
2	France	71,291	69,557	68,079	68,487
3	Germany	70,621	71,283	57,178	43,634
4	Poland	55,675	51,644	46,289	44,462
5	United Kingdom	53,675	42,244	38,628	30,562
6	South Africa	39,963	31,254	24,307	24,915
7	United States	39,400	36,090	28,560	21,470
8	Scandinavia	33,378	27,890	24,872	19,570
9	Netherlands	32,616	23,062	17,028	16,359
10	Kenya	29,674	23,540	18,646	14,769
11	Spain	21,218	15,831	10,794	11,712
12	Czech Republic	18,706	16,174	16,632	18,521
13	China	18,410	12,136	6,792	2,476
14	India	14,760	10,022	9,544	8,182
15	Russia	13,361	8,467	9,166	6,447
	Others	—	210,359	194,399	180,009
	Total	—	736,755	638,498	548,503

== Challenges ==
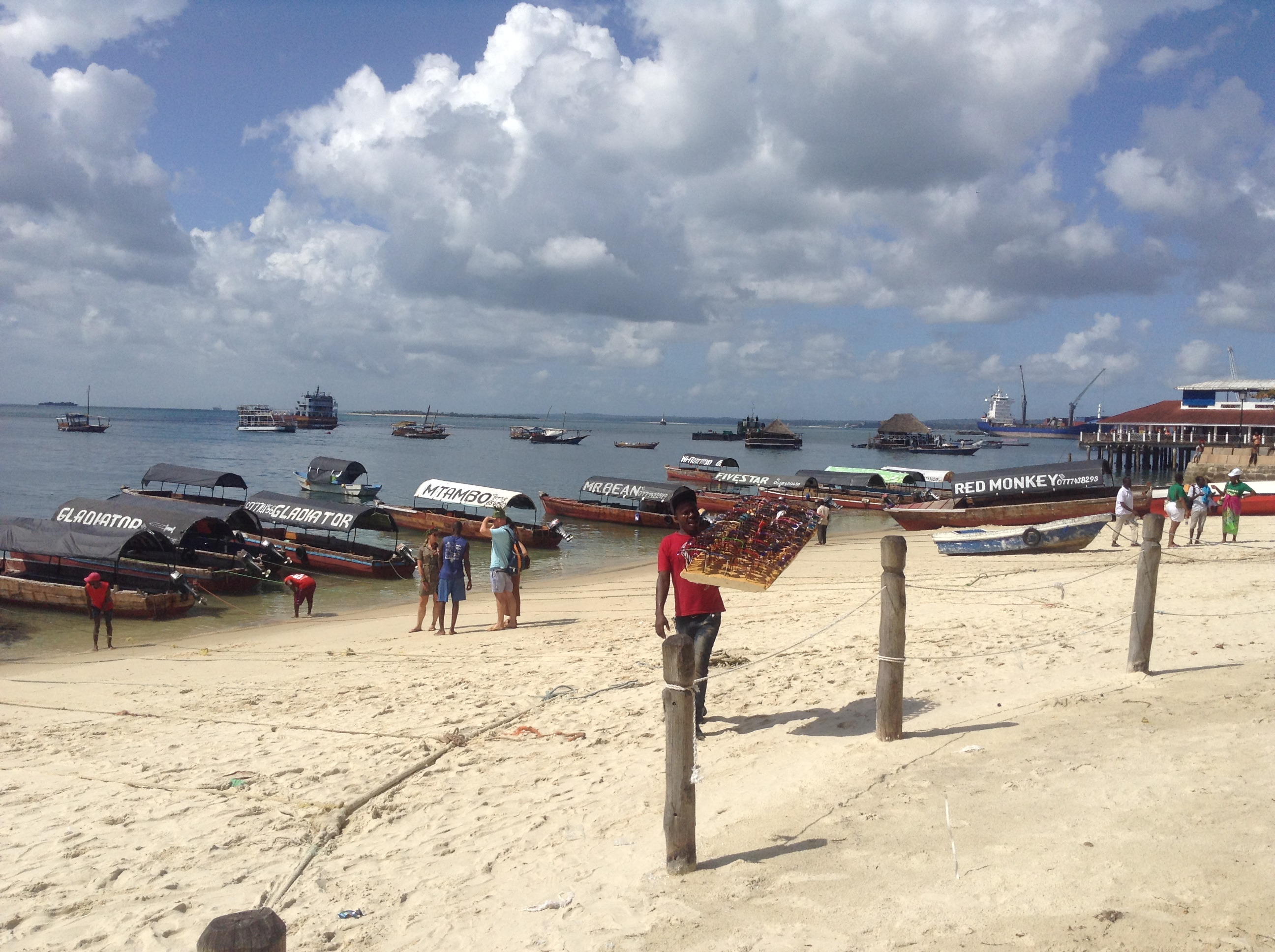
A beach in Zanzibar transformed into a transportation hub catering towards tourists, with vendors like the one in the foreground, selling goods mostly for tourists. Tourism frequently displaces local communities from access to natural resources in favor of tourist industry needs.

=== Quality of infrastructure ===
As of 2014, one third of housing did not meet international tourist standards. Accommodations that do meet that standard are expensive to operate, often having to generate their own electricity because of poor reliability of the local grid.

=== Local economy ===
A 2015 study concluded that the tourist economy did not contribute to pro-poor growth. There is limited evidence that tourism has helped with poverty alleviation, the industry primarily benefits multinational conglomerates and hotel chains.

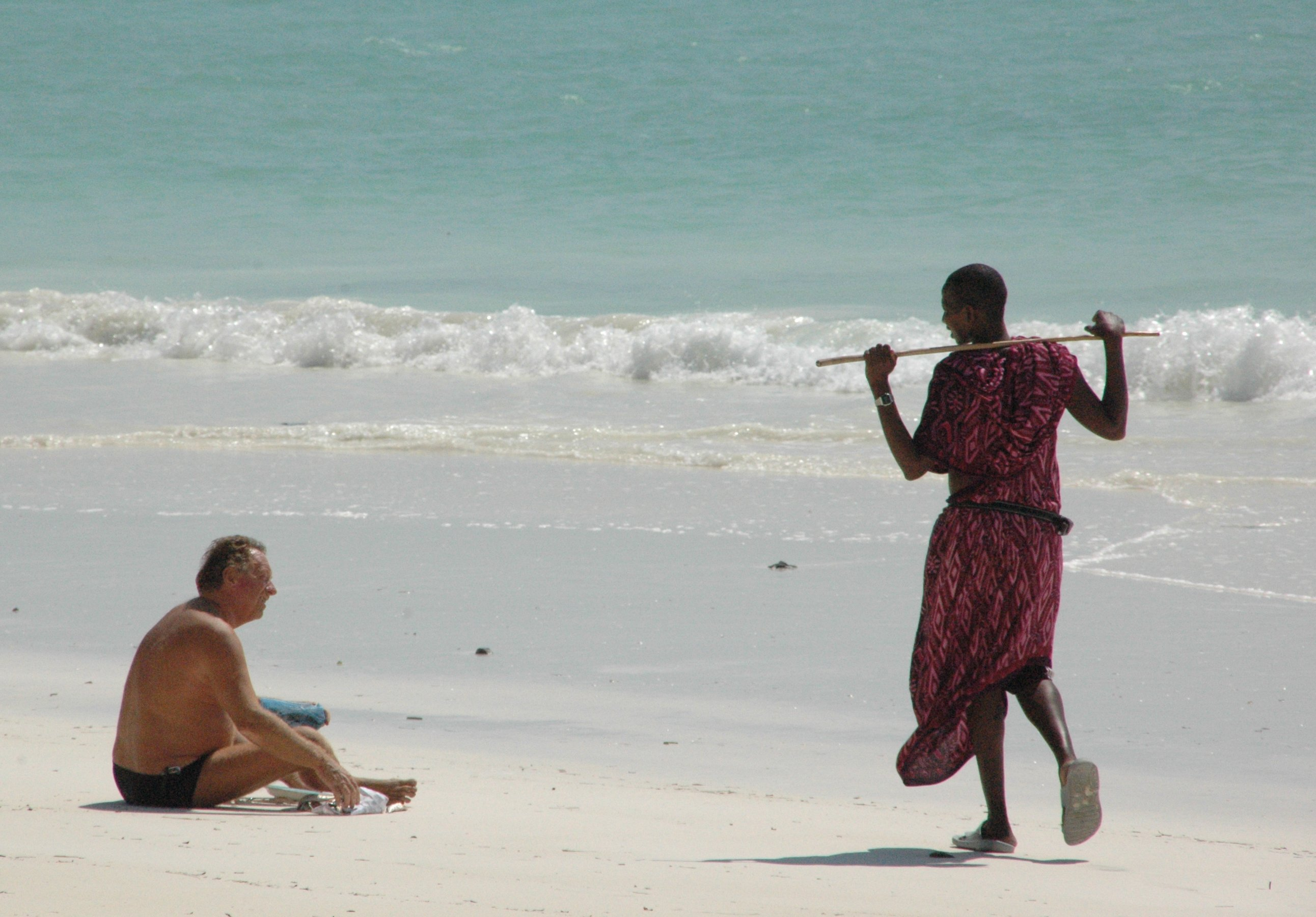
Man dressed in traditional Maasai attire approaching a tourist on the beach

Though there is a lot of work in the face of the tourism industry, it does not all benefit local labor. 2009 estimates of workers in the tourism industry suggested that 83% of unskilled jobs in hotels and 70% in restaurants, but only 46% of managerial positions in hotels, and just 11% in restaurants, were held by local Zanzibari staff. Professional development opportunities on the island, for example the Zanzibar Hotel and Tourism Institute, are too expensive for locals. A 2020 article highlighted thousands of Maasai men migrating to join the tourism industry on the island and using their ethnic dress to sell goods and services, including sex work.

Most of the food goods eaten in the tourism sector cannot be produced locally, which increases prices for the local community.

=== Water resources ===
Tourists use as much as 15 times as much water as locals, which, combined with saltwater intrusion and general water scarcity raises serious water equity issues.

=== Waste and damage to local ecosystems ===
The growing tourist industry is leading to a significant amount of plastic marine debris and human waste from untreated wastewater discharge. Illegal dumping on land and at sea has become a serious issue across the region; Zanzibar's only landfill at Kibele is massively overfilled, and only half of all waste makes it to official disposal. Tourism accounts for 80% of the waste produced on Unguja.

=== Climate change ===
45% of the local economy is dependent on the marine ecosystem, including much of the tourism. However, because much of the infrastructure and tourism is on the coast, many of the tourist destinations already are experiencing salt-water intrusion, sea level rise and coastal erosion—and much of this is expected to get worse as sea level rise continues. Other factors and risks include rising temperatures and uncertainty about freshwater supply.

Government actors coordinated by the First Vice President Office are working to build a National Framework for Climate Change Response which includes new rules and mechanisms for addressing threats to the tourism sector. Actors feel like the effectiveness of climate change adaptation have been hampered by resourcing and expertise needed to implement the programs.

== Picture gallery ==
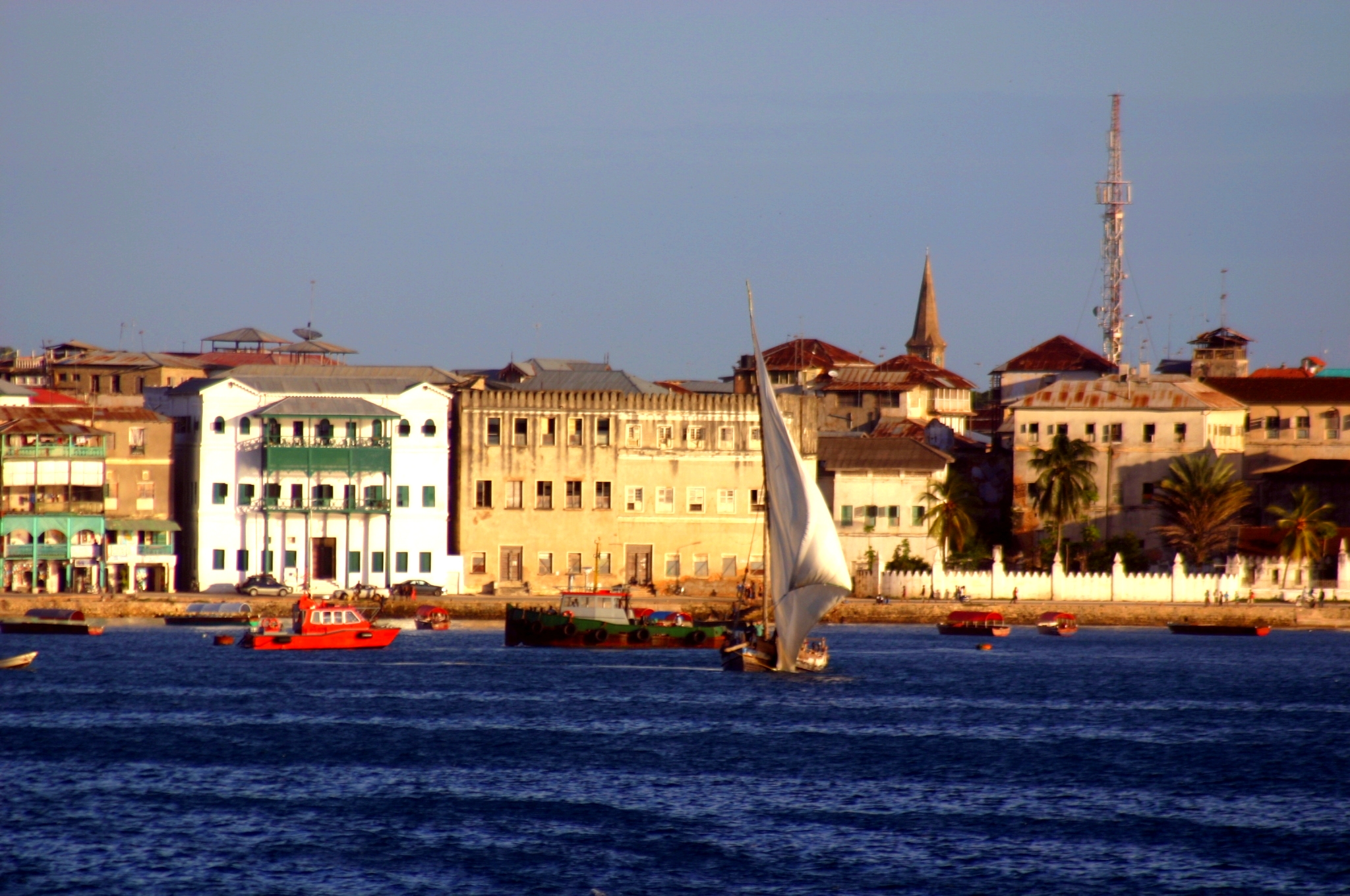
Stone Town

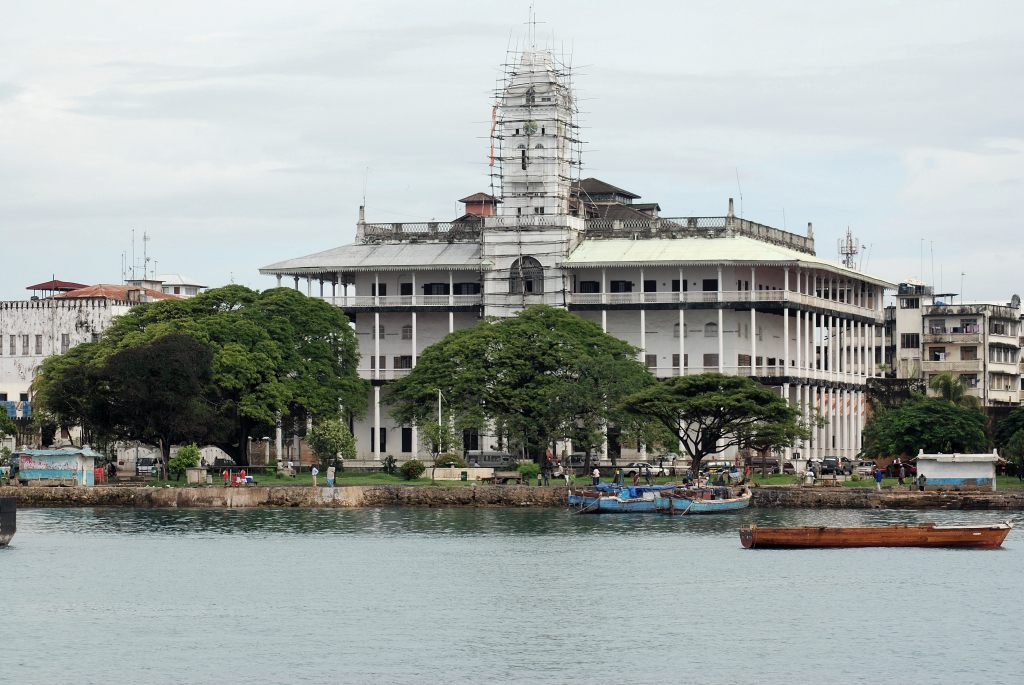
House of Wonders

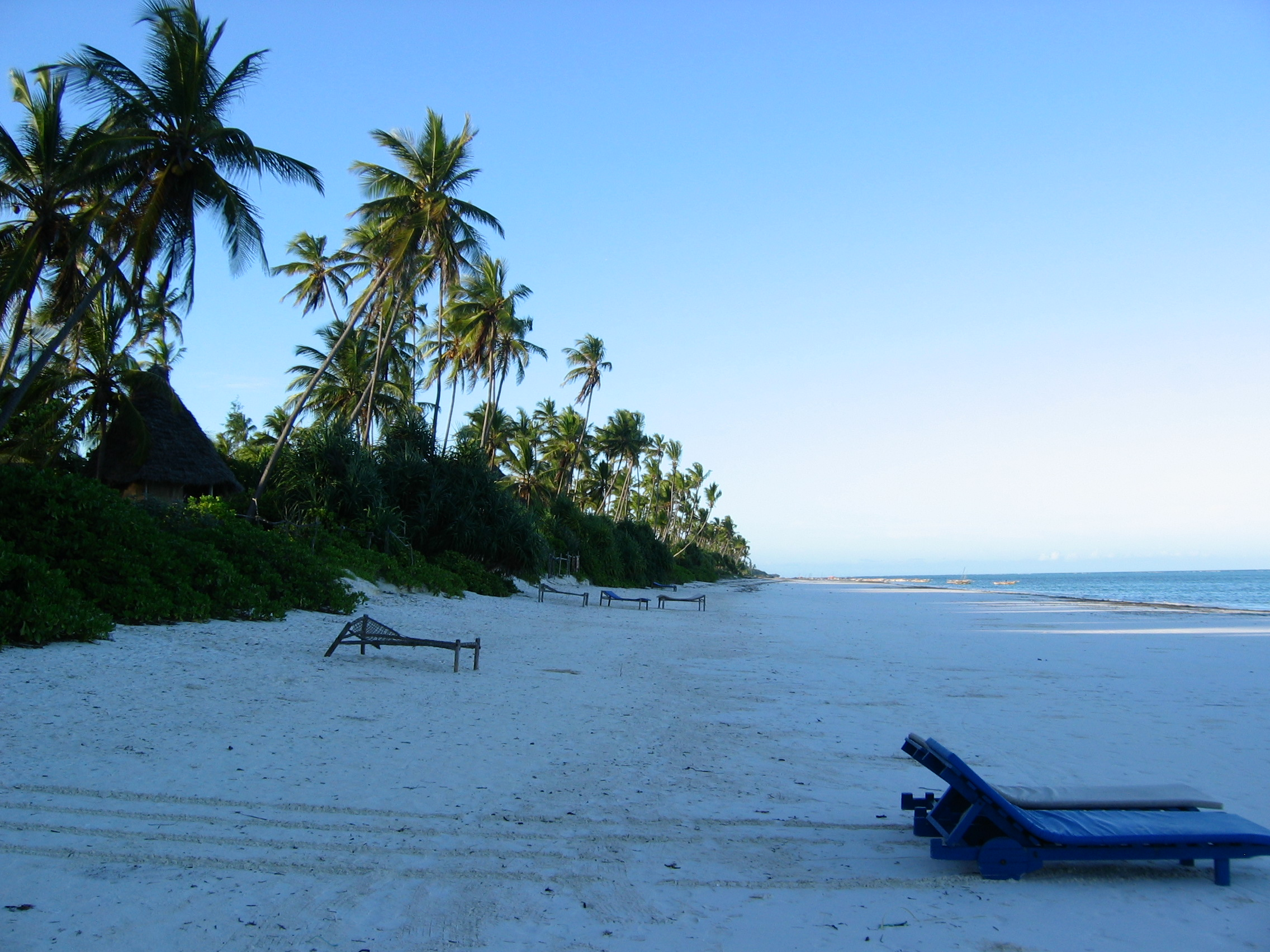
Zanzibar West Coast beach
