= Phrynobatrachus pakenhami =

Conservation status
- Endangered (IUCN 3.1)

Scientific classification
- Kingdom: Animalia
- Phylum: Chordata
- Class: Amphibia
- Order: Anura
- Family: Phrynobatrachidae
- Genus: Phrynobatrachus
- Species: P. pakenhami

Binomial name
- Phrynobatrachus pakenhami Loveridge, 1941

Synonyms
- Phrynobatrachus nigripes Pickersgill, 2007

Species of amphibian

Phrynobatrachus pakenhami is a frog species in the family Phrynobatrachidae. It is endemic to Pemba Island off Tanzania. It is similar to Phrynobatrachus acridoides, its sister species, but the two species differ in ecology and male advertisement call. On the other hand, the recently described, supposed diminutive species P. nigripes was simply based on juveniles and subadults of P. pakenhami.

== Etymology ==
The specific name pakenhami honours Richard Hercules Wingfield Pakenham, a British colonial administrator who studied the fauna of Zanzibar and Pemba. Common name Pakenham's river frog has been coined for it.

== Description ==
Adult males measure 25–35 mm (1.0–1.4 in) and adult females 31–36 mm (1.2–1.4 in) in snout–vent length, although different authors report somewhat different ranges. The body is rather stocky. The snout is obtusely pointed. The tympanum is visible. The digital tips have discs, small on the fingers but well-developed on the toes. The toes are moderately webbed. Skin is smooth except for the W-shaped scapular warts. The dorsum is more or less uniform grey or brownish grey. The snout often bears a lighter triangle. A broad, light vertebral area, and a broad, transverse interorbital bar may be present. Darker brown patches are superimposed on the scapular warts. Hind limbs may have broad, light-edged dark crossbars. The upper lip is either uniform grey or barred. Venter is whitish with some minute, brown spots. Males have dark grey throat. Females are marked with brown blotches, which may give a dark cast to the throat.

== Habitat and conservation ==
Phrynobatrachus pakenhami occurs in forest and forest fringes of the northern part of the Pemba Island. Breeding takes place in pools, marshes, puddles and roadside ditches in and near tropical evergreen lowland forest.

This species does not occur in severely disturbed habitats. It is common in the Ngezi Forest Reserve that contains the last remaining stand of indigenous rainforest on the island. It is threatened by habitat loss and may have already disappeared outside the Ngezi Forest Reserve.
