= Phinda Private Game Reserve =

Coordinates: 27.775°S 32.350°E

Phinda Private Game Reserve (/ˈpɪndə/), formerly known as Phinda Resource Reserve, is a private game reserve in northern KwaZulu-Natal, South Africa. The reserve forms part of the Munywana Conservancy, a protected conservation landscape made up of community and private landowners, including the Makhasa Community Trust, the Mnqobokazi Community Trust, &Beyond Phinda and ZUKA Private Game Reserves. The conservancy covers approximately 29,866 ha (73,800 acres)

Phinda itself covers approximately 28,555 ha (70,560 acres) and contains seven distinct habitats, including rare dry sand forest. The reserve supports populations of the Big Five, cheetah and 436 bird species. Its seven distinct habitats include sand forest, mountain bushveld, open woodland, riverine forest, palm savanna, wetland and grassland. The reserve protects approximately 1,000 ha (2,500 acres) of rare dry sand forest.

Phinda was established in 1991 following the conversion of former agricultural and hunting land into a wildlife conservation area. Early conservation work included habitat rehabilitation and the reintroduction of locally extinct wildlife species, including white rhinoceros, nyala, cheetah and elephant.

In 2007, land associated with Phinda was returned to the Makhasa and Mnqobokazi communities, both of which requested that the land continue to be used for conservation. This land now forms part of the Munywana Conservancy.

The reserve and wider Munywana Conservancy have been involved in conservation work relating to black and white rhinoceros, cheetah, pangolin, lion and elephant.

Phinda and the Munywana Conservancy are associated with Temminck’s pangolin reintroduction research led in partnership with the African Pangolin Working Group.

The Munywana Conservancy is a collaboration between community and private landowners in northern KwaZulu-Natal. Covering a total area of 29,866 ha (73,800 acres), it includes the Makhasa Community Trust, the Mnqobokazi Community Trust, &Beyond Phinda and ZUKA Private Game Reserves.

In May 2024, the conservancy received 40 southern white rhinoceros as the first translocation under 'Rhino Rewild', an African Parks initiative to rewild 2,000 southern white rhinoceros into secure protected areas across Africa over a 10-year period. The Munywana Conservancy has also served as a source population for rhinoceros translocations to other protected areas on the continent, including Akagera National Park in Rwanda and Garamba National Park in the Democratic Republic of the Congo.

Tourism at Phinda is centred on wildlife viewing and guided safari activities. The reserve is served by six lodges operated by &Beyond.

== Fauna ==
Wildlife inhabiting this reserve include elephant, giraffe, zebra, lion, African wild dog, blue wildebeest, Cape buffalo, hippopotamus, southern white rhinoceros, south-central black rhinoceros, suni, spotted hyena, cheetah and leopard.

== See also ==
- List of conservation areas of South Africa
- Wildlife of South Africa
- Ecotourism
- Mnemba Island
