= Kidike Root Site =

Nature Sanctuary on Pemba Island, Tanzania

Coordinates: 5.18920161°S 39.8216858°E

The Kidike Root Site is a nature area in the central part of Pemba Island. It has the endangered Pemba Flying Fox, considered the largest number bat species in the world. Other animals in the island are the vervet monkeys, Mozambique cobras, tortoises, bush crabs, red eyed doves and mangrove king fishers.

Kidike Root Site is located close to the village Ole-Mjini, some 12 km north-east of Chake-Chake. A local NGO is offering tours.
