= Chumbe Lighthouse =

Lighthouse on Tanzania's Zanzibar Island

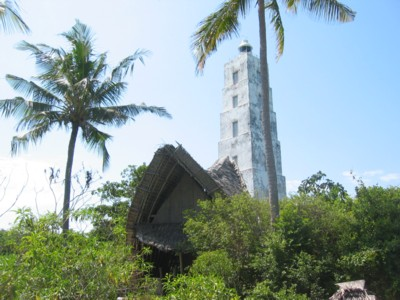
- Chumbe Lighthouse
- Location: Chumbe Island; Zanzibar
- Coordinates: 6°16′48.5″S 39°10′37.5″E

Tower
- Constructed: 1904
- Construction: stone tower
- Height: 34 metres (112 ft)
- Shape: 5-stage square tower with balcony and lantern
- Markings: unpainted tower, white lantern
- Operator: Chumbe Island Coral Park

Light
- Focal height: 37 metres (121 ft)
- Lens: 4th order Fresnel lens
- Range: 16 nautical miles (30 km; 18 mi)
- Characteristic: Fl W 11s.

The Chumbe Lighthouse (Swahili: Mnara wa Taa wa Chumbe) is a historic lighthouse located on Chumbe Island on Malindi ward of Mjini District in the Mjini Magharibi Region of Tanzania's Zanzibar Island.

Until 2013 it burned acetylene to produce the light, a process that since 1926 had been automated with use of a sun valve. The lighthouse now uses a solar-powered (photovoltaic) system.

== See also ==
- List of lighthouses in Tanzania
