= Chumbe Island =

Private Island in Mjini Magharibi Region of Zanzibar, Tanzania

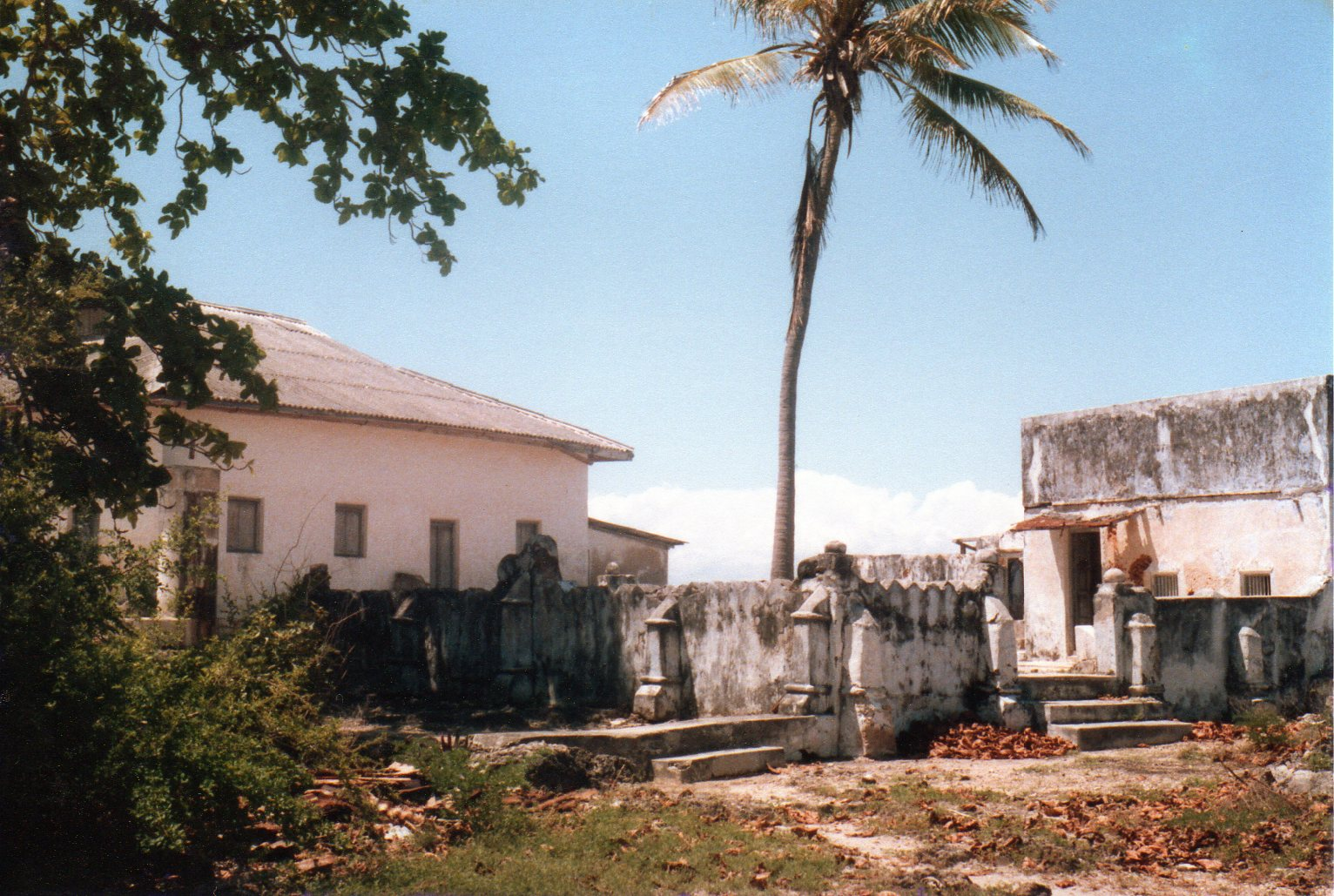
- Old Swahili mosque on Chumbe Island of Zanzibar

- Location within Tanzania

Geography
- Location: Zanzibar Channel
- Coordinates: 06°16′39″S 39°10′59″E
- Archipelago: Zanzibar Archipelago
- Adjacent to: Indian Ocean
- Length: 1.0 km (0.62 mi)
- Width: 0.3 km (0.19 mi)

Administration
- Tanzania
- Region: Mjini Magharibi Region
- District: Mjini
- Ward: Malindi

Demographics
- Languages: Swahili
- Ethnic groups: Hadimu

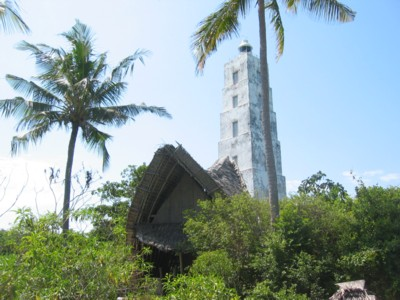
Chumbe Island lighthouse.

Chumbe Island (Kisiwa cha Chumbe, in Swahili) is a private island in the Mjini Magharibi Region, Tanzania, off the coast of Mjini District. It is situated in the Zanzibar Channel. The island is known for its ecological innovation and exceptional coral reefs. The Chumbe Lighthouse is also located on the island.

== Overview ==
The island has two historic buildings, a small Swahili mosque and the lighthouse, both built around the beginning of the 20th century. In 1992 the fringing reef west of Chumbe Island was officially closed to fishing, boating, and diving. In 1994, the island and its surrounding waters were declared the Chumbe Island Coral Park, which contains the Chumbe Reef Sanctuary and the Closed Forest Reserve. The park is run by the nonprofit private organization Chumbe Island Coral Park, Ltd. (CHICOP), which conducts marine research and small amounts of eco-tourism on the island.

After the government of Tanzania established the protected area around the island and the fringing coral reef in 1994, the government gave the management rights to CHICOP, which is in charge of the CHICOP management plant. The Chumbe Reef Sanctuary is registered as a marine protected area by the World Conservation Monitoring Centre, and the first marine park in Tanzania The high quality of the reef is attributable to the fact that the island was within a military zone which limited human impact on the marine life.

== Private Marine Park ==
Chumbe Island Coral Park Ltd (CHICOP) is a private nature reserve that was developed from 1991 for the conservation and sustainable management of uninhabited Chumbe Island off Zanzibar, one of the last pristine coral islands in the region.

The park includes a fully protected coral reef sanctuary and forest reserve that harbour extremely rare and endangered animals, a Visitor and Education centre, a small eco-lodge, nature trails and historical ruins. All buildings and operations are based on state-of-the-art eco-technology aiming at zero impact on the environment (rainwater catchment, photovoltaic energy and solar water heating, composting toilets, vegetative greywater filtration etc.).

The company objectives are non-commercial, while operations follow commercial principles. The overall aim of CHICOP is to create a model of financially and ecologically sustainable Park management, where ecotourism supports conservation, research and comprehensive Environmental Education programs for local schools and other benefits for local people.

CHICOP has won several awards relating to its environmental and sustainable development work, most notably the UN 500 Roll of Honour:

- United Nations Environment Programme Global 500 (2000)

One of the main settings in Giles Foden's 2002 novel Zanzibar, the island of Lyly, appears to be based on Chumbe Island. As depicted by the author, Lyly Island has a lighthouse and a mosque.

== Biodiversity ==
Chumbe Island and the surrounding area display an exceptional amount of biodiversity in both plant and animal life. For example, at least 90% of all hard coral species that have been recorded in Eastern African reefs have been found near Chumbe Island. In addition to coral, around 400 fish species that are part of 50 fish families have been documented, including more rare species of fish like the Giant Grouper, Epinephelus lanceolatus.

Seabirds such as roseate terns have successfully bred on Chumbe Island, as well and coconut crabs are frequently seen. The creation of this protected area has allowed for the free breeding of fish, coral and other marine species that have begun to repopulate the over-exploited nearby areas such as those directly off the coast of Zanzibar.

=== Important Bird Area ===
A 4,000 ha site encompassing adjacent Kombeni and Kiwani bays on the south-western side of Unguja as well as Chumbe Island, has been designated an Important Bird Area by BirdLife International because it supports populations of Terek sandpipers, crab plovers, as well as the breeding colony of some 750 pairs of roseate terns on Chumbe, as estimated in 1994.
