= Matemwe =

Coordinates: 5°52′S 39°21′E

Matemwe is a village located in Kaskazini A District of Unguja North Region on the north-eastern coast of Unguja, the main island of the Zanzibar Archipelago, between Mwangaseni and Kigomani. Its economy is mostly based on seaweed farming and fishing. The village hosts an education project aimed at providing computer literacy in the community, as well as the Dada (in swahili: "sister") cooperative, which creates job opportunities for Zanzibari women through the production of handmade cosmetics and food products such as jam, mustard and sweets that are sold in Stone Town.

Matemwe is home to the Tamani Foundation, a charitable school, which provides local students with quality education. The facilities include a nursery school, the only one in Matemwe, and an adult education program, where English, Math and Computer skills are taught.

Most visitors come to Matemwe for its beach, the longest in Zanzibar. The beach is affected by tides, so visitors should check tide schedules before visiting. However, for those staying in Matemwe, this is not an issue, as the tide rises twice every 24 hours. The beach is quiet, and visitors are rarely approached by papasis (beach boys).

Internationally, Matemwe is especially known for its relatively unspoiled white sand beaches with few and expensive tourist structures, which makes for an exclusive vacation destination. The village is fronted by a lagoon and coral reef, as well as the small atoll of Mnemba, which is a particularly appreciated place for snorkeling and scuba diving. Fish species that can be easily spotted in the area include giant trevallies, trumpetfish, anthiases, groupers and snappers.
