= Ngezi Forest Reserve =

Protected forest on Pemba Island, Tanzania

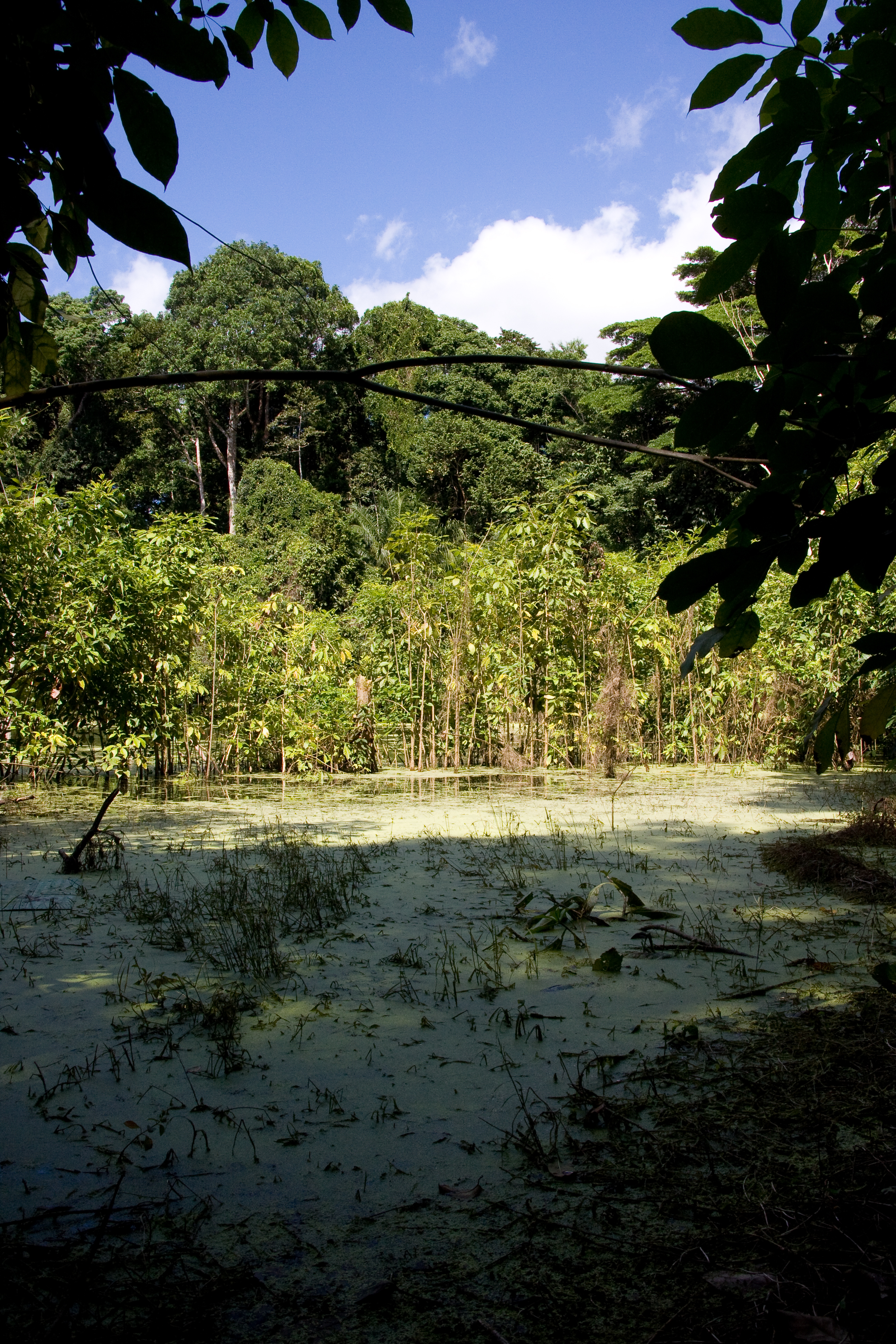

- Location within Tanzania
- Location: Pemba Island, Tanzania
- Coordinates: 4°55′S 39°42′E
- Area: 1,440 ha (3,600 acres)
- Established: 1959

The Ngezi Forest Reserve is a forest reserve located in the Micheweni District of the North Pemba Region on Pemba Island, Tanzania. It covers an area of 1,440 hectares (3,600 acres), mostly comprising primary forest. The reserve was established in 1959.

== Geography ==
The Ngezi Reserve is located in the north-western tip of Pemba, the second largest island in the Zanzibar Archipelago. It borders on the villages of Kiuyu Kwa Manda (south), Tondooni, Verani and Makangale (north), Msuka (east) and Kipangani (west); to the west, it also borders on the Pemba Channel.

== Environment ==
The reserve includes several biomes, including tropical forest, riverine forest, and maquis shrubland. Some plants found in the area are Odyendea zimmermanni, Uapaca guineensis, Antiaris toxicaria, Elaeis guineensis, Erythrophleum suaveolens, Pachystela brevipes, Bombax rhodognaphalon, Quassia undulata, and Croton sylvaticus. Riverine forest mostly comprises Barringtonia racemosa and Samadera indica, as well as Raphia and Anthocleista where swamps are found. Shrubland is mostly found on the Tondooni peninsula, and its vegetation includes Sorindeia madagascariensis, Diospyros consolatae, Tamarindus indica, Afzelia quanzensis, Terminalia boivinii, Cussonia zimmermannii, and Olea woodiana.

Some areas of the reserve are dominated by mangroves, and host Sonneratia alba, Avicennia marina, Xylocarpus granatum, Bruguiera, Rhizophora, and Ceriops. Other notable plants found in the reserve are the endemic Chrisalidocarpus pembanus and Ensete proboscoideum, as well as Terminalia catappa, Musa acuminata, Typhanodorun lindleyanum, and Philippia mafiensis. There is also a significant number of orchids, including Aerangis, Bulbophyllum, Eulophia, Disperis johnstonii, Nervilia bicarinata, and Vanilla roscheri.

Fauna in the reserve includes some rare species, such as the endemic Pemba flying fox; almost extinct in recent years, its population has now grown to an estimated 20,000 individuals, thanks to an effective protection programme. Primates include an endemic subspecies of vervet monkey, as well as the Zanzibar red colobus, a species that was introduced in the reserve in the 1970s. Other notable species found in the reserve are the blue duiker and the Pemba scops owl.
