= Zala Park =

Protected area in Zanzanibar

Zala Park is small reserve located about 5km from the Jozani National Park in Zanzibar. It is where many animals can be seen in captivity. The park was developed by Mohammad, the Park's Ranger with the objective of educating local children about preserving endangered species and the need for their preservation. The animal species are big pythons. Chameleons, geckos, tortoises, crabs, dik-dik (mini gazelle-like animals), striped lizards, monitor lizards and hyrax (looks like a rabbit without ears and is the closest living species to the elephant). The reserve is set amidst rich vegetation of trees such as orange, lime, grapefruit, nutmeg, banana, ginger, chillies, black pepper and cinnamon.
