= Chumbe Marine Park =

Group of marine wildlife reserves in Tanzania

- (CMP)
- IUCN category II (national park)
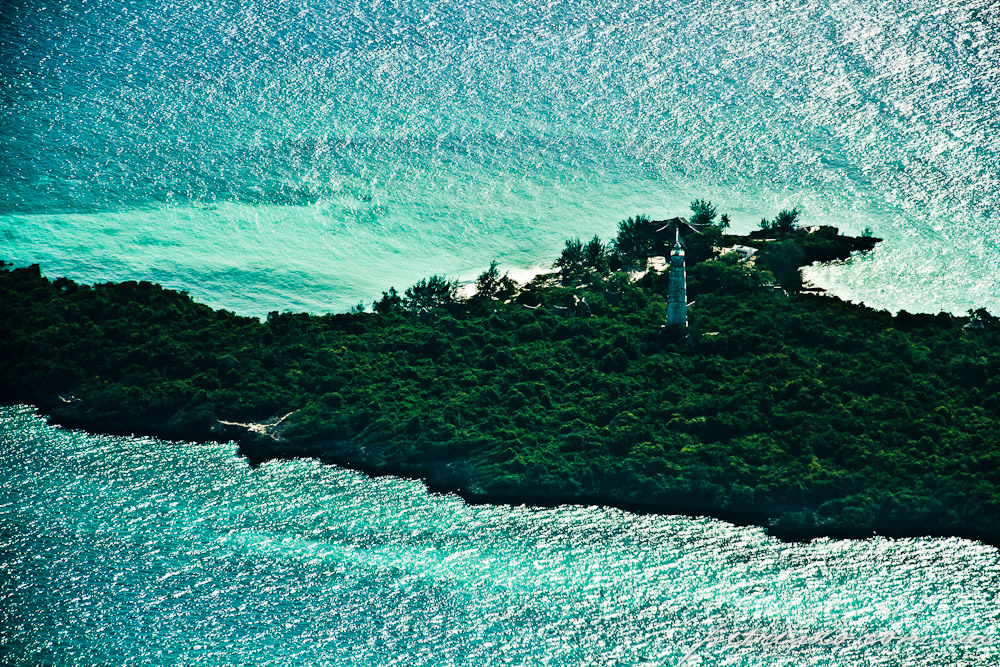
- Chumbe Island

- Location within Tanzania
- Location: Tanzania, Mjini Magharibi Region, Mjini District
- Nearest city: Zanzibar City
- Coordinates: 06°16′39″S 39°10′59″E
- Area: km²
- Established: 1994
- Governing body: Privately run but licensed under Marine Parks & Reserves Authority (Tanzania)
- Website: Chumbe Island Marine Park

The Chumbe Marine Park, officially recognized officially as Chumbe Reef Sanctuary (Hifadhi Bahari Akiba ya Kisiwa cha Chumbe, in Swahili) is a privately managed marine park on Chumbe Island, Zanzibar since 1994. It is successful as an ecotourism project. The objective of this sanctuary is to preserve and develop the rich biodiversity of the coral. Set up after controversial debate over a period of three years between the private developer of the park, the government and the local fishermen, the sanctuary has received funds from European Union, Gesellschaft für Technische Zusammenarbeit (the German aid agency) and many other donors including the initial developer.The sanctuary offers a terrestrial Nature Trail and an "Eco-lodge" for accommodation as well as an education centre. In particular, among the many awards it has received, the important ones are the "UNEP Global 500 Award for Environmental Achievement" and the British Airways Tourism for Tomorrow Southern Regional and Global Awards. It is one of the most beautiful and diverse shallow reefs in the region. It is home to 90% of hard coral in East Africa with over 400 fish species, and is also an important feeding ground for green turtles and hawksbill. The Coral Reef Sanctuary is vital for biodiversity conservation as well as for fisheries in the region.
