= Mnemba Island =

Island off the coast of Unguja, Zanzibar, Tanzania

Coordinates: 5°49′14.21″S 39°23′1.29″E

Mnemba Island is a single small island located about 3 km off the northeast coast of Unguja, the largest island of the Zanzibar Archipelago, Tanzania, opposite Muyuni Beach. It is roughly triangular in shape, about 500 metres (1,640 ft) in diameter and about 1.5 kilometres (0.9 mi) in circumference. It is surrounded by an oval reef seven by four kilometres in extent. These reefs have been declared a marine conservation area. Mnemba Island and its reef are sometimes called Mnemba Atoll which is incorrect because an atoll is an island that encircles a lagoon, which is not the case for Mnemba Island. Mnemba Island is a popular scuba diving site, with a wide variety of corals and associated species, as well as occasional sightings of larger species such as turtles and dolphins. Calm conditions are most frequent in November and March, with maximum visibility. As Mnemba is a private island, non-guests are not permitted to land on the island. The island has a 500-meter exclusion zone around the island within which non-guests are not permitted.

Mnemba Island is a 90-minute drive from Stone Town across the main Zanzibar Island, before a twenty-minute boat crossing.

The marine reserve comprises four distinct habitats which are home to a diverse array of Indian Ocean wildlife:

- Nesting place of threatened green sea turtles (monitoring and protection project has been underway since 1996)
- Three species of dolphin
- Whale sharks (the world's largest fish)
- Migratory and resident shore birds feed and roost on the Island
- Approximately 600 species of coral reef fish.

Green sea turtles can be seen laying their eggs on the beaches between February and September.

Mnemba Island forms part of the Mnemba Island Marine Conservation Area (MIMCA), which is managed through a collaborative framework involving government authorities, local communities, and conservation organisations.

Conservation efforts focus on maintaining coral reef health, supporting marine biodiversity, and reducing human impact through regulated access. Sea turtle monitoring and protection programmes are conducted in collaboration with organisations such as Oceans Without Borders and Wild Impact.

These initiatives include data collection, community engagement, and efforts to support the long-term sustainability of marine ecosystems in the region.
