= Ras Makunduchi Lighthouse =

- Location: Makunduchi; Kusini District; Unguja South Region; Tanzania
- Coordinates: 6°25′40.9″S 39°34′2.3″E

Tower
- Constructed: 1919
- Construction: concrete tower
- Height: 27 metres (89 ft)
- Shape: square tower with balcony and lantern
- Markings: white and ed horizontal bands
- Power source: solar power

Light
- Focal height: 44 metres (144 ft)
- Range: 18 nautical miles (33 km; 21 mi)
- Characteristic: Fl (2) W 15s.

The Ras Makunduchi Lighthouse is located at the south eastern tip of Kusini District Unguja South Region of Tanzania. The lighthouse is located near the historic town of Makunduchi. It is a 27m squared concrete tower painted red and white. The tower has 165 steps to the top and has two non resident operators. Since the lighthouse is on Zanzibar, it is managed by the Zanzibar Ports Corporation instead of the Tanzania Ports Authority.

== See also ==
- List of lighthouses in Tanzania
