= Mtegani =

Ward of the Kusini District in Unguja South Region of Tanzania

Mtegani Kata ya Mtegani (Swahili)
- Ward of Kusini District
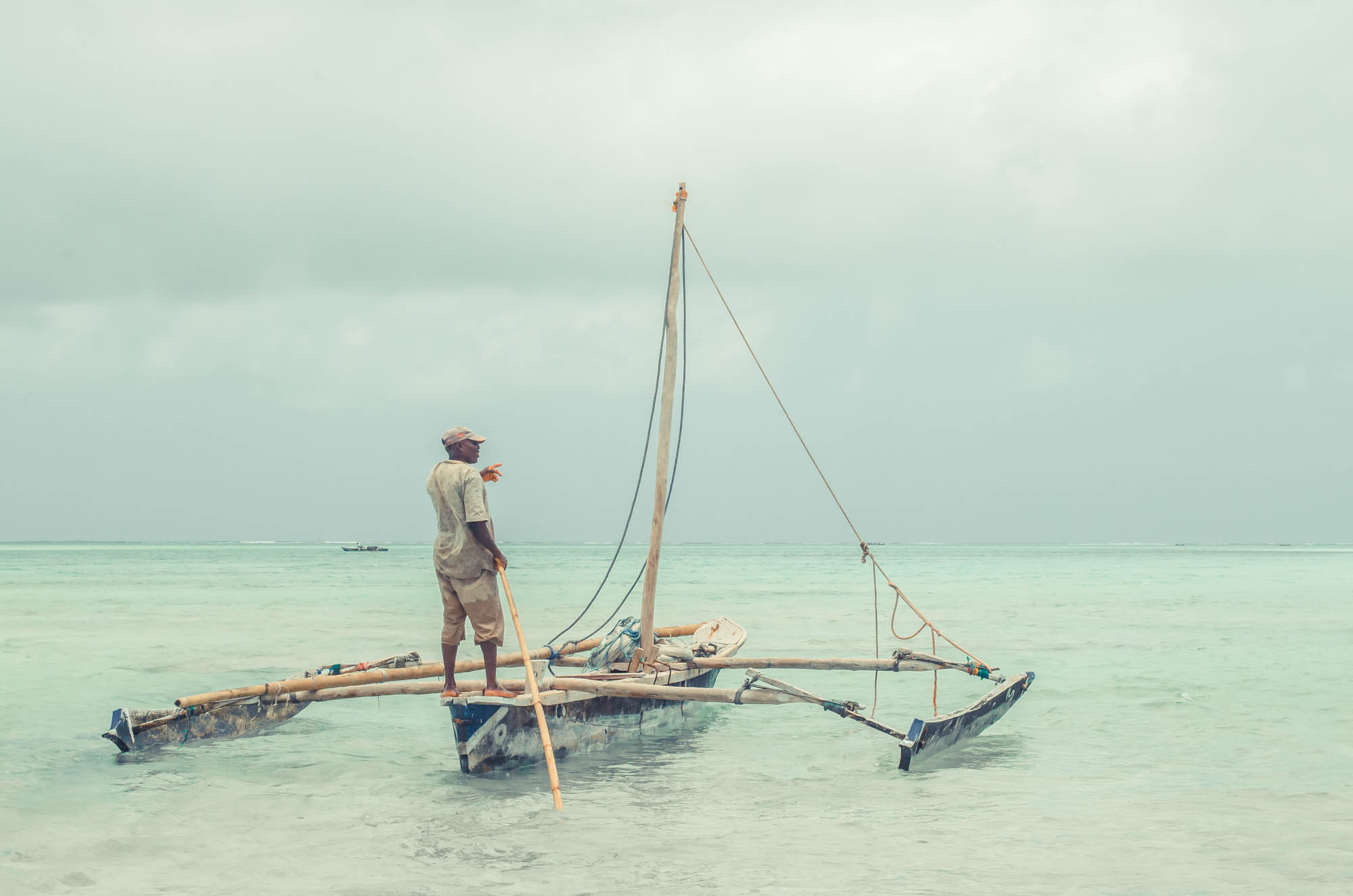
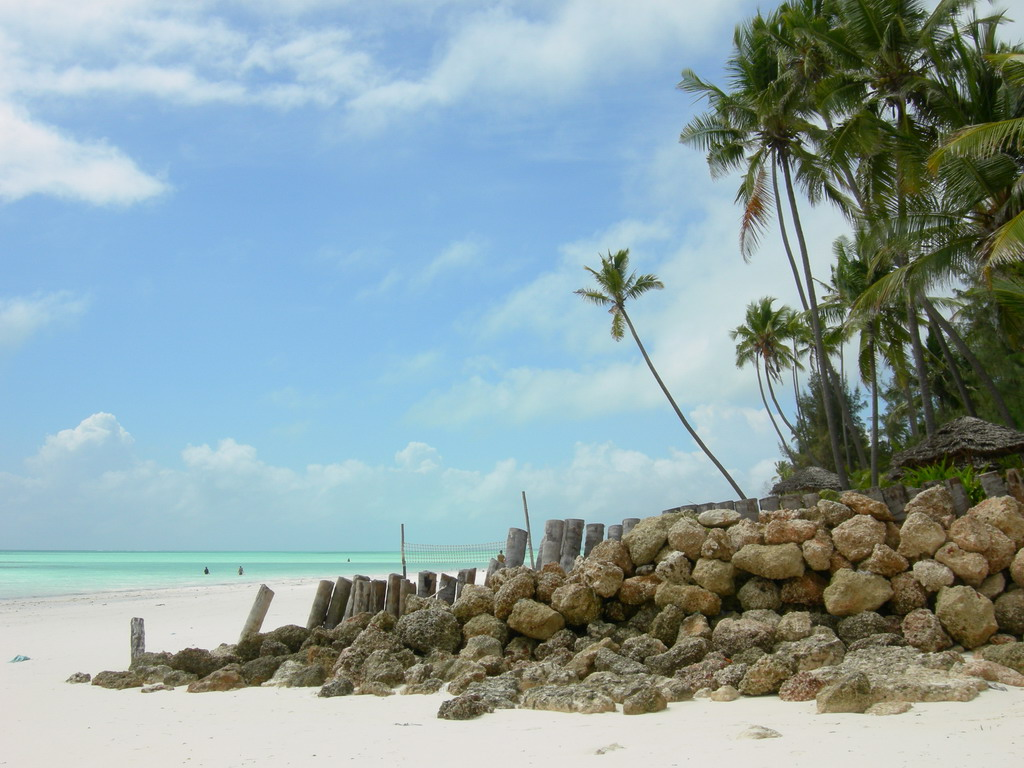
- From top to bottom: Metepe fisherman at Makunduchi beach & rocks on beach in Makunduchi, Mtegani ward

- Location within Tanzania
- Coordinates: 6°24′14.76″S 39°33′5.04″E
- Country: Tanzania
- Region: Unguja South Region
- District: Kusini District
- Headquarters: Kiongoni

Area
  - Total: 13.187 km^{2} (5.092 sq mi)

Population (2012)
  - Total: 3,156
- Demonym: Mtenganian

Ethnic groups
  - Settler: Swahili
  - Ancestral: Hadimu
- Tanzanian Postal Code: 72103

Mtegani (Kata ya Mtegani in Swahili) is an administrative ward in the Kusini District of the Unguja South Region in Tanzania. The ward is bordered by Kajengwa ward to the north, Mzuri ward to the south. Kizimkazi ward borders the ward to the west and the Indian Ocean to the east. Because former wards Kiongoni and Kijini were combined to form Mtengani ward, the ward covers an area of 13.187 km^{2} (5.092 sq mi), and has an average elevation of 31 m (102 ft). The ward administers the southern half of the town of Makunduchi. According to the 2012 census, the ward has a total population of 3,156.

== Administration ==
The postal code for Mtegani Ward is 72103. The ward is divided into the following neighborhoods (Mitaa):

- Kijini
- Kiongoni

=== Government ===
The ward, like every other ward in the country, has local government offices based on the population served.The Mtegani Ward administration building houses a court as per the Ward Tribunal Act of 1988, including other vital departments for the administration the ward. The ward has the following administration offices:

- Mtegani Ward Police Station located in Kiongoni neighborhood
- Mtegani Ward Government Office (Afisa Mtendaji) in Kiongoni Neighborhood
- Mtegani Ward Tribunal (Baraza La Kata) is a Department inside Ward Government Office

In the local government system of Tanzania, the ward is the smallest democratic unit. Each ward is composed of a committee of eight elected council members which include a chairperson, one salaried officer (with no voting rights), and an executive officer. One-third of seats are reserved for women councillors.
