= Mkapa =

Mkapa is a surname. Notable people with the surname include:

- Anna Mkapa, former First Lady of Tanzania
- Benjamin Mkapa (1938–2020), Tanzanian politician
- Dunstan Mkapa (born 1948), Tanzanian politician
