= Wanu Hafidh Ameir =

Tanzanian politician

Wanu Hafidh Ameir MP

Member of Parliament National Assembly (Tanzania)
- Incumbent
- Assumed office 2016
- Constituency: None (Special Seats)

Member of Zanzibar House of Representatives
- Incumbent
- Assumed office 2005
- Constituency: None (Special Seats)

Personal details
- Born: 9 February 1982 (age 44) Unguja South, Zanzibar, Tanzania
- Party: Chama Cha Mapinduzi
- Spouse: Mohamed Mchengerwa
- Parents: Hafidh Ameir Hassan (father); Samia Suluhu (mother)
- Education: Kawanda Secondary School; Centre for Foreign Relations (Dip); Open University of Tanzania (LL.B)

Wanu Hafidh Ameir (born 9 February 1982) is a Tanzanian CCM politician and a member of the Zanzibar House of Representatives in the National Assembly of Tanzania since 2005. Her mother Samia Suluhu Hassan became President of Tanzania in 2021.

She graduated in law in 2018 from the online Open University of Tanzania.
