= Hafidh Ameir Hassan =

First Gentleman of Tanzania from 2021 to 2026

First Gentleman of Tanzania
- In role 17 March 2021 – 7 September 2026
- President: Samia Suluhu Hassan
- Preceded by: Janeth Magufuli (as first lady)

Personal details
- Born: 1 January 1946 Kisakasaka, Sultanate of Zanzibar
- Died: 7 September 2026 (aged 80) Zanzibar, Tanzania
- Party: Chama Cha Mapinduzi
- Spouse: Samia Suluhu Hassan (m. 1978)
- Children: 4, including Wanu Hafidh Ameir
- Profession: Agriculturalist, Teacher

Hafidh Ameir Hassan (1 January 1946 – 7 September 2026) was a Tanzanian agriculturalist, teacher and agricultural academic who was First Gentleman of Tanzania from 2021 until his death in 2026 as the husband of President Samia Suluhu Hassan. He was the first man to hold the role after Hassan became Tanzania's first female president.

== Biography ==
Ameir was born on 1 January 1946 in Kisakasaka village, West B District, in the present-day Mjini Magharibi Region (Urban West Region) of Zanzibar. He completed primary school in 1960 and secondary school at Tumekuja Secondary School in 1965. In 1970, he enrolled at Zanzibar Teachers' College, graduating in 1973, and subsequently worked as a teacher at several schools in Tanzania.

In 1980, he studied agriculture at Uyole Agricultural College in Mbeya. He became an agriculture instructor at Fidel Castro School in Pemba in 1982. From 1986 to 1988, he pursued further agricultural studies in Sri Lanka, obtaining a diploma and specialising in coconut farming. After returning to Zanzibar, he worked at the Ministry of Agriculture. In 1990, he pursued a master's degree in agricultural machinery engineering in Britain. He continued working at the Ministry of Agriculture until his retirement in 2005 and later taught at Kizimbani Agricultural College in Unguja.

Ameir married Samia Suluhu Hassan in 1978, before she entered national politics. The couple had four children, three sons and a daughter. Their daughter, Wanu Hafidh Ameir, became a politician and a member of the Zanzibar House of Representatives.

When Hassan was sworn in as president on 19 March 2021, Ameir became Tanzania's first First Gentleman. He maintained a low public profile and was only occasionally seen accompanying his wife at official events.

Ameir died on 7 September 2026 at the Emilio Mzena Memorial Hospital in Zanzibar, where he had been receiving treatment for heart disease. He was 80. He was buried at his home in the coastal village of Kizimkazi, Unguja South Region, Zanzibar.

Honorary titles
Preceded by Janeth Magufuli as First Lady	First Gentleman of Tanzania; 2021–2026	Vacant
