= Dimbani =

Village on the island of Unguja, Zanzibar

Coordinates: 6°26′S 39°28′E

Dimbani - officially Kizimkazi Dimbani - is a village on the Tanzanian island of Unguja, part of Zanzibar. It is one of a pair of villages located close to the southern tip of the west coast, the other being Kizimkazi Mtendeni (commonly known simply as Kizimkazi).

Dimbani's most notable feature is Kizimkazi Mosque, one of the oldest Islamic structures in East Africa.

== See also ==
- Southeast Africa
