= Kizimkazi Mosque =

Mosque in Dimbani, Kusini, Tanzania

- Misikiti wa kale wa Kizimkazi Dimbani (Swahili)
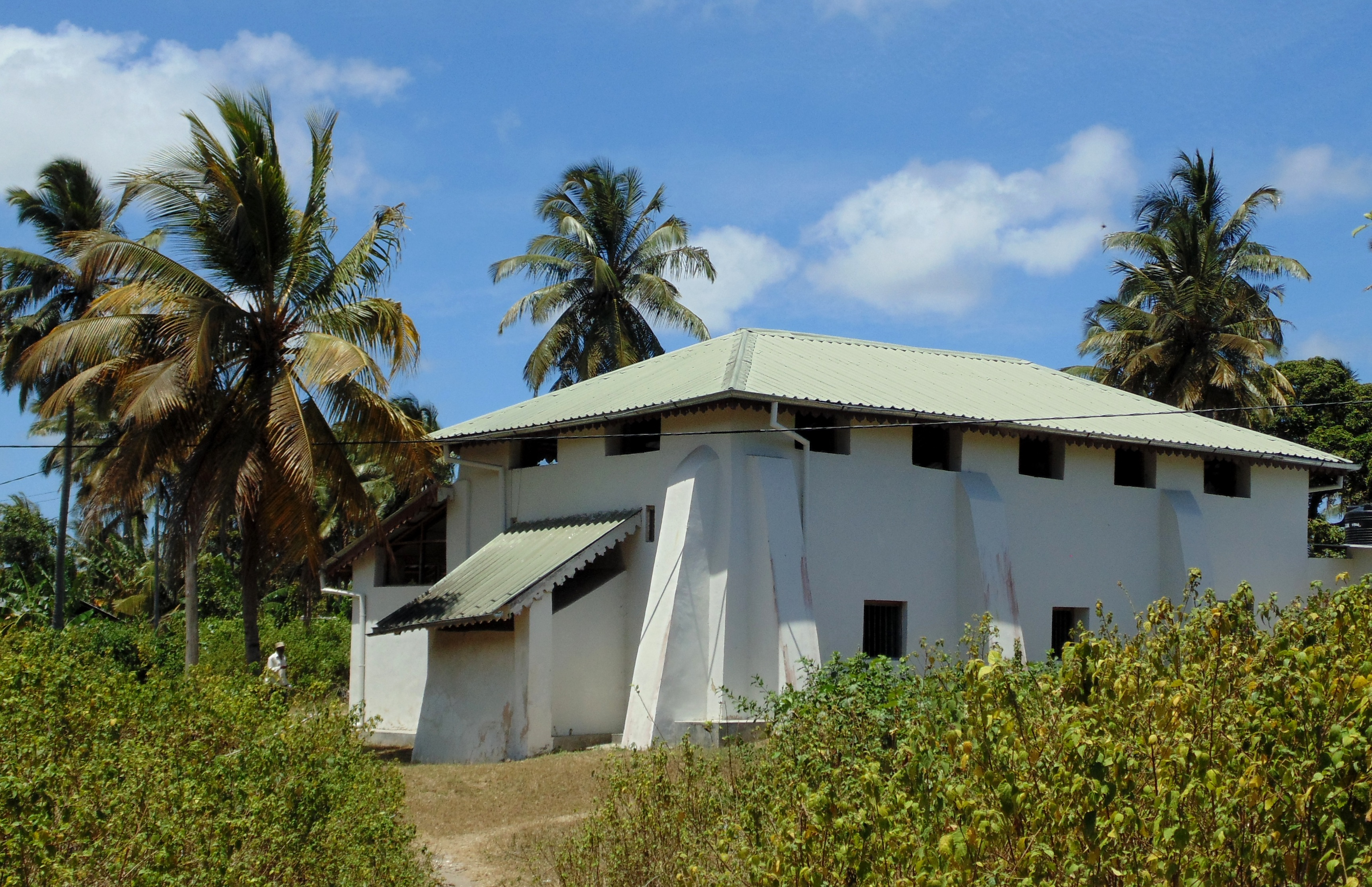

- Location in Tanzania

Religion
- Affiliation: Islam
- Ecclesiastical or organizational status: Mosque
- Ownership: Tanzanian Government

Location
- Location: Dimbani, Kusini District, Unguja South Region
- Country: Tanzania
- Interactive map of Kizimkazi Mosque
- Administration: Antiquities Division, Ministry of Natural Resources and Tourism
- Coordinates: 6°26′10″S 39°27′45″E

Architecture
- Type: Mosque
- Style: Swahili; Islamic
- Completed: 1107 CE
- Materials: Coral rag

National Historic Sites of Tanzania
- Official name: Kizimkazi Mosque
- Type: Cultural
- The oldest mosque that is still in use today in East Africa

The Kizimkazi Mosque, officially the Kizimkazi Dimbani Mosque (Swahili: Misikiti wa kale wa Kizimkazi Dimbani), is a mosque located in the town of Dimbani, in the Kusini District of Unguja South Region in Tanzania. It is situated on the southern tip of the island of Zanzibar in Tanzania and is one of the oldest Islamic buildings on the East African coast.

The mosque, in current use, was listed as a National Historic Site.

== Overview ==
Despite its name, it is located in Dimbani, not Kizimkazi, which is 4.8 kilometres (3 miles) away. (Note: The official names of the two joined villages are Kizimkazi Dimbani and Kizimkazi Mtendeni.) According to a preserved kufic inscription, the mosque was built in 1107 CE. Although the inscription and certain coral-carved decorative elements date from the period of construction, the majority of the present structure was rebuilt in the 18th century.

== Gallery ==
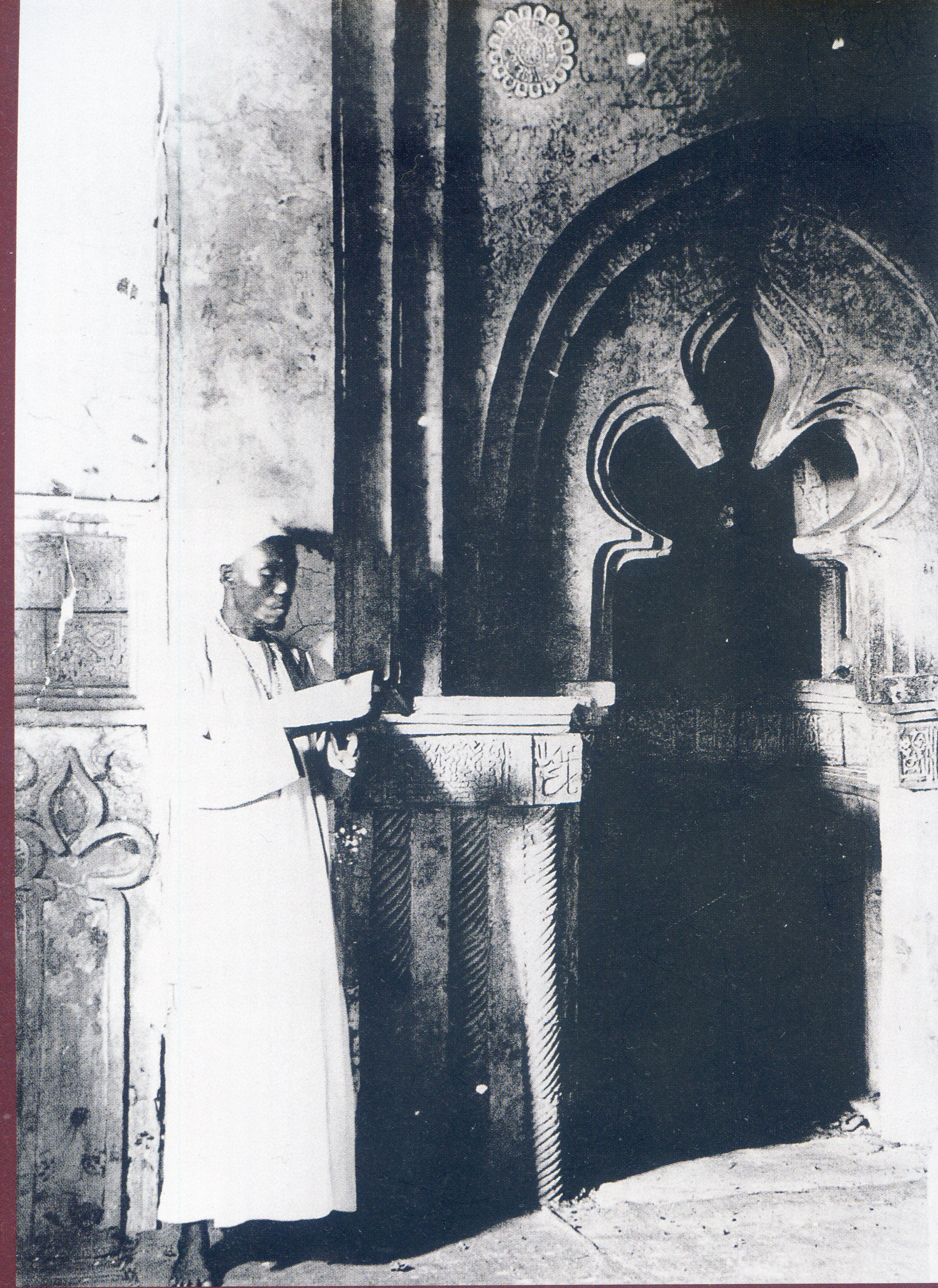
Kizimkazi Mosque interior in the 19th Century.

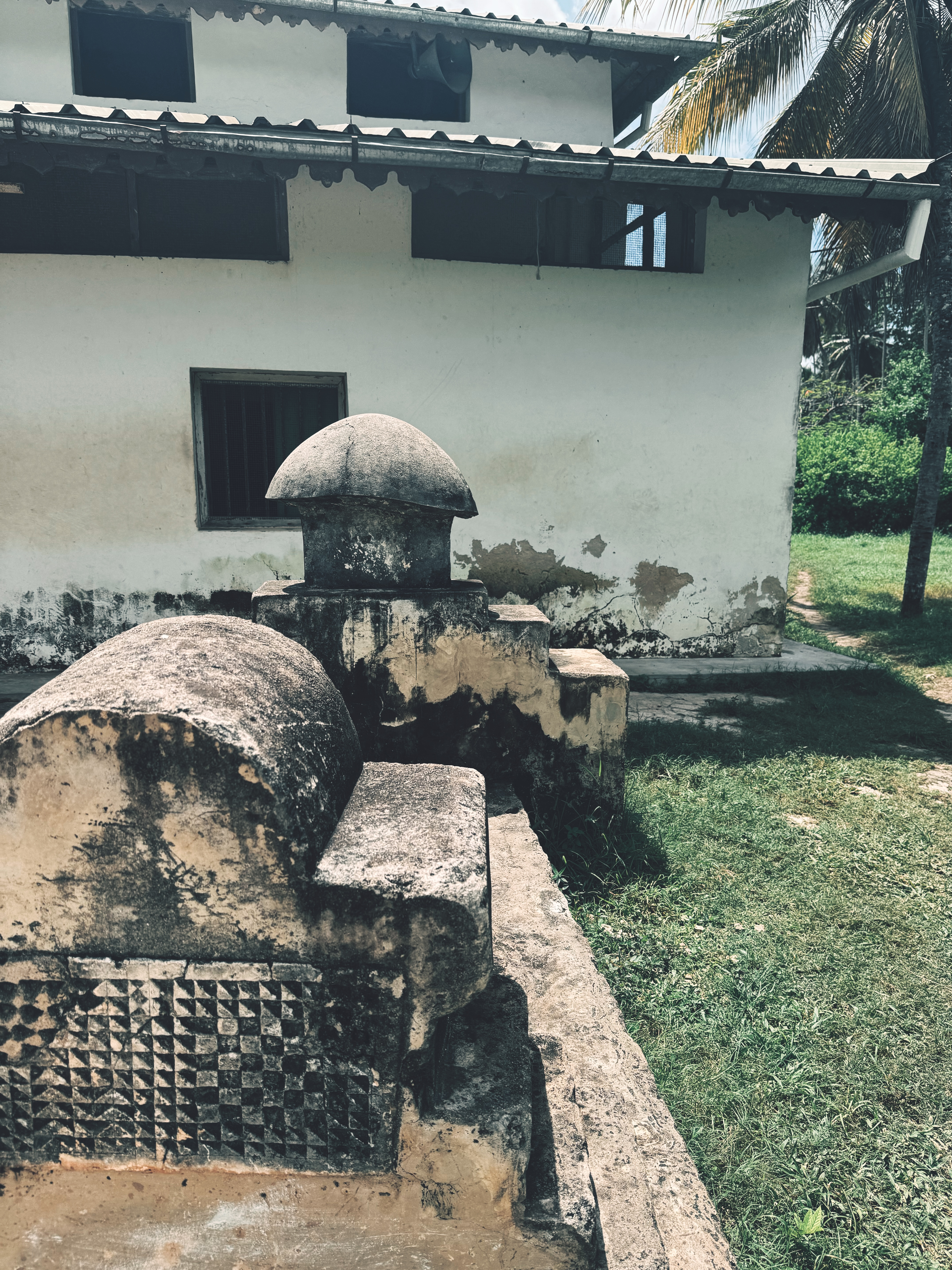
Kizimkazi Mosque Cemetery with pillar tombs

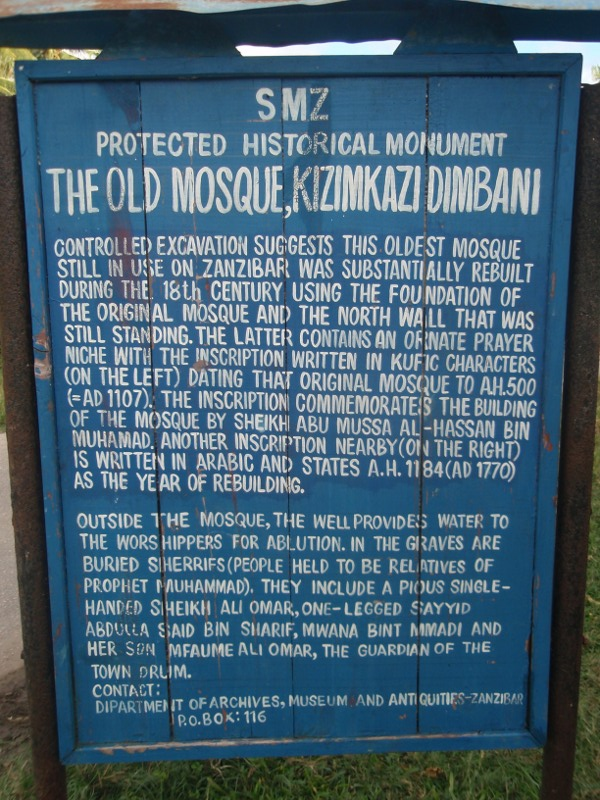
Information sign

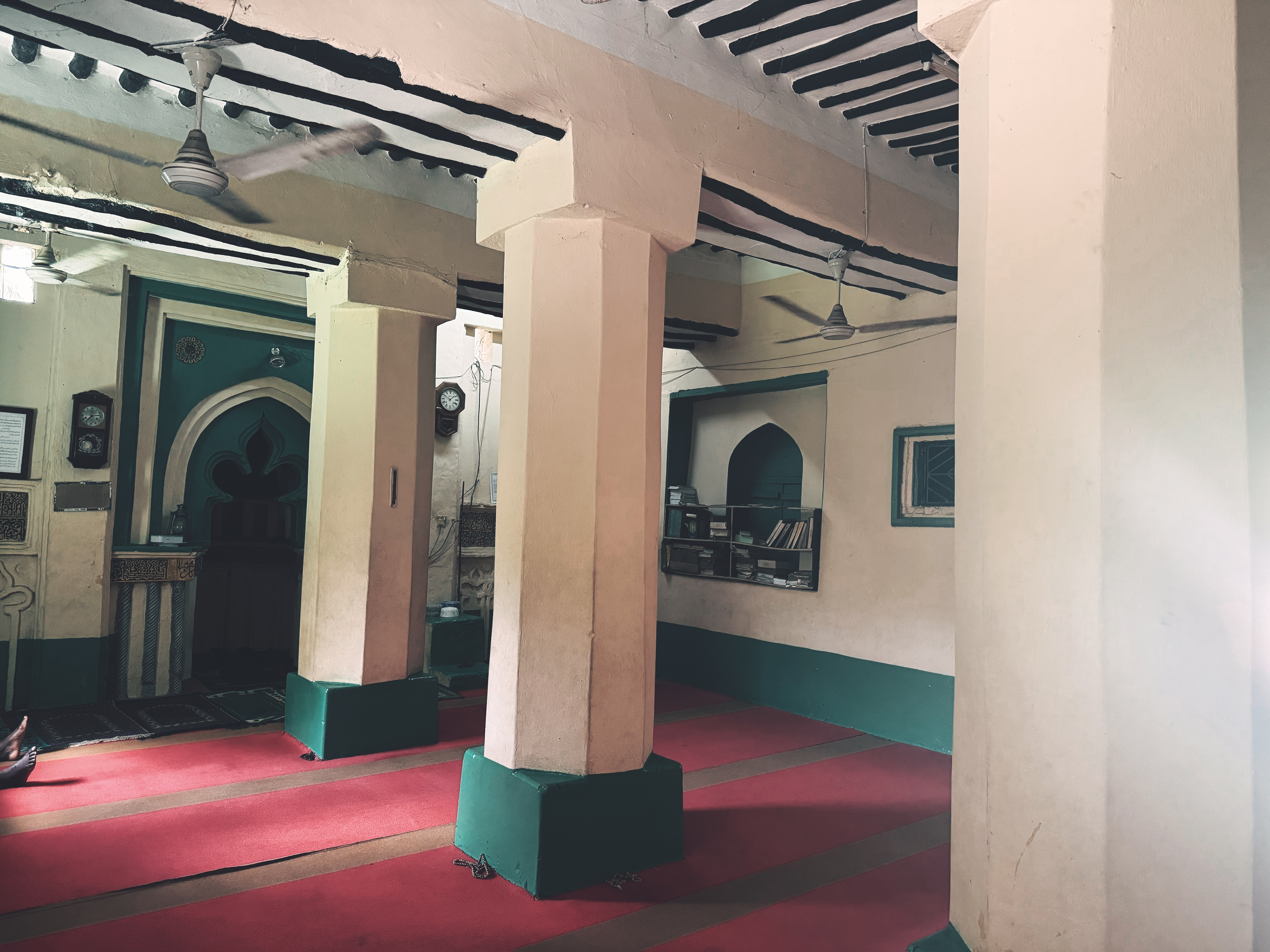
Kizimkazi Mosque prayer hall

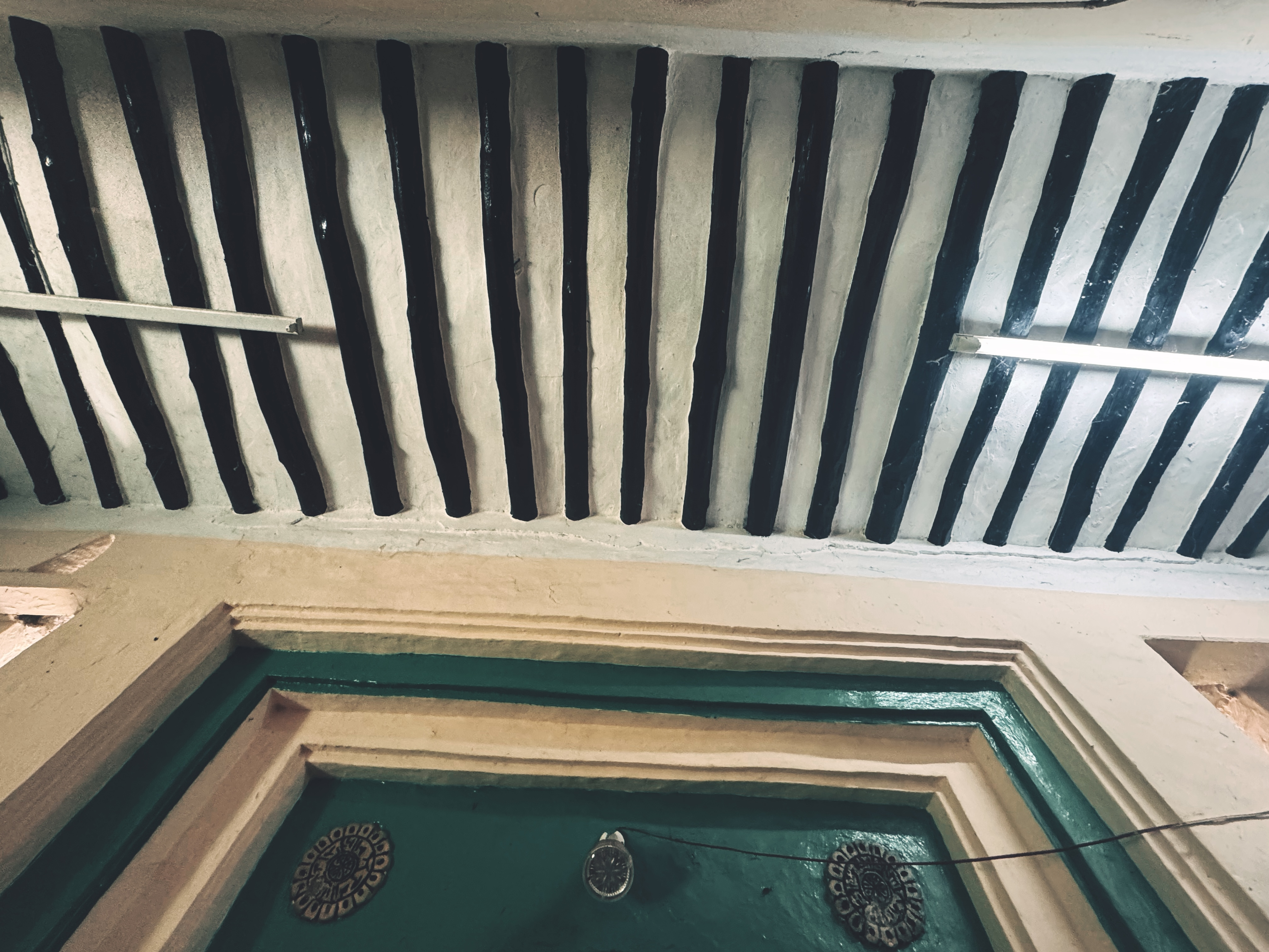
Swahili architecture magrove pool roofs at Kizimkazi Mosque

== See also ==
- Islam in Tanzania
- List of mosques in Tanzania
- Historic Swahili Settlements
