= Siti Mwinyi =

First Lady of Tanzania from 1985 to 1995

2nd First Lady of Tanzania
- In role 5 November 1985 – 23 November 1995
- President: Ali Hassan Mwinyi
- Preceded by: Maria Nyerere
- Succeeded by: Anna Mkapa

Personal details
- Born: 1932 (age 93–94) British Tanganyika
- Party: TANU and later CCM
- Spouse: Ali Hassan Mwinyi (m. 1960; died 2024)

Siti Mwinyi (born 1932) served as the second First Lady of Tanzania from 1985 to 1995.
