= Salma Kikwete =

Tanzanian activist and wife of Jakaya Kikwete

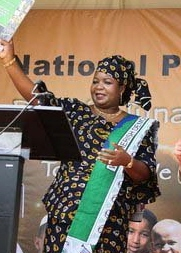

4th First Lady of Tanzania
- In role 21 December 2005 – 5 November 2015
- President: Jakaya Kikwete
- Preceded by: Anna Mkapa
- Succeeded by: Janeth Magufuli

First Lady of African Union
- In office 31 January 2008 – 2 February 2009
- President: John Kufuor
- Preceded by: Theresa Kufuor
- Succeeded by: Safia Farkash

Personal details
- Born: 30 November 1963 (age 62)
- Party: CCM
- Spouse: Jakaya Kikwete (m. 1989)
- Children: 5
- Profession: Teacher

Salma Kikwete (born 30 November 1963) is a Tanzanian educator, activist, and politician who served as the First Lady of Tanzania from 2005 to 2015 as the wife of Tanzanian President Jakaya Kikwete.

Salma Kikwete originally worked as a teacher for more than twenty years.

In 2005, the government launched a national campaign for voluntary HIV/AIDS testing in Dar es Salaam. Salma Kikwete and her husband were among the first in the country to be tested. As of 2009, she was Vice President of the Eastern Region of the Organisation of African First Ladies against HIV/AIDS (OAFLA). In 2012, the First Lady Salma Kikwete, former Botswana President Festus Mogae and ten other African figures partnered with UNESCO and UNAIDS to support the Eastern and Southern Africa Commitment on HIV Prevention and Sexual Health for Young People, which was launched in November 2011.

Kikwete also founded the Wanawake na Maendeleo, or Women in Development (WAMA), a nonprofit which promotes development among women and children.

Over a year after her husband left office, Salma Kikwete was appointed to a seat in the National Assembly by President John Magufuli on 1 March 2017.
