= Kati District =

District of Unguja South Region, Tanzania

Kati
- District of South Zanzibar
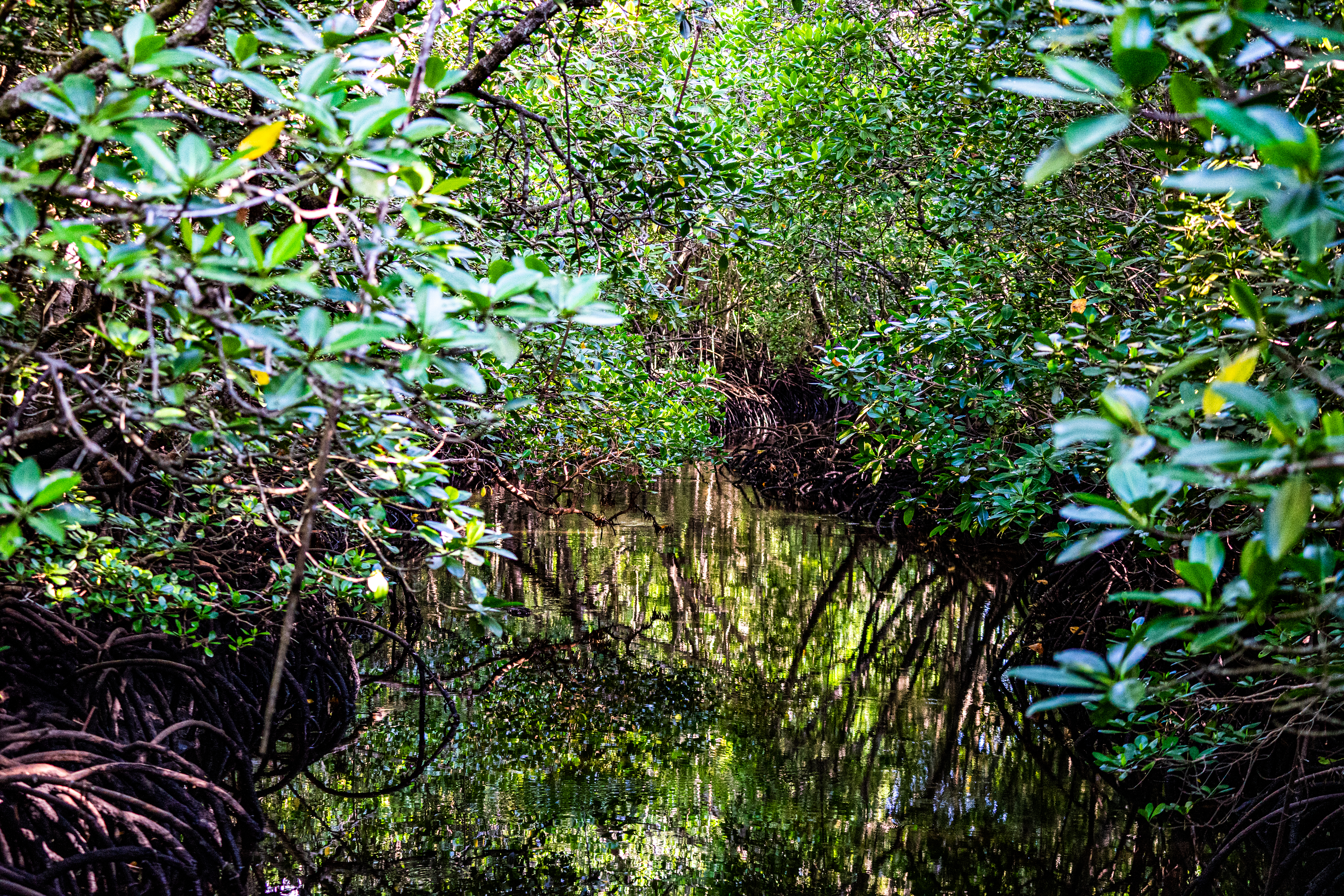
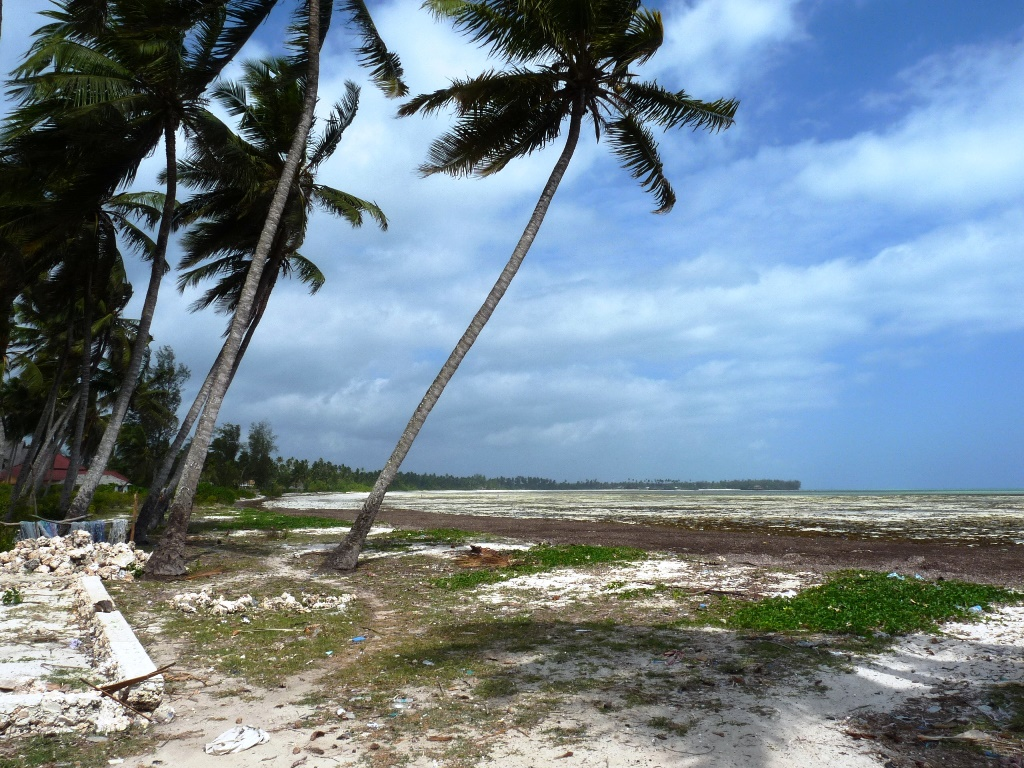
- From top to bottom: Jozani Chwaka Bay National Park & Pongwe coast
- Nickname: National Park district
- Location in Unguja South
- Coordinates: 6°5′59″S 39°17′59″E
- Country: Tanzania
- Region: Unguja South Region
- Capital: Tunguu

Area
  - Total: 505.8 km^{2} (195.3 sq mi)
  - Rank: 1st in Unguja South

Population (2022)
  - Total: 132,717
  - Rank: 1st in Unguja South
  - Density: 262.4/km^{2} (679.6/sq mi)
- Demonym: Zanzibari Kati

Ethnic groups
  - Settler: Swahili
  - Native: Hadimu

Kati District (Wilaya ya Kati in Swahili) is one of two administrative districts of Unguja South Region in Tanzania. The district covers an area of 505.8 km^{2} (195.3 sq mi). The district is comparable in size to the land area of Guam. The district has a water border to the east and west by the Indian Ocean. The district is bordered to the north by Kaskazini B District of Unguja North Region. To the south Kati District is bordered by Kusini District. The district seat (capital) is the town of Tunguu. The district is the birthplace of Bi Kidude, most famous Zanzibari musician born in Kitumba Village. According to the 2022 census, the district has a total population of 132,717. The Zanzibar University is located in Tunguu and was founded in 2002.

== Administrative subdivisions ==
As of 2012, Kati District was administratively divided into 11 wards.

=== Wards ===
1. Bambi
2. Chwaka
3. Dunga
4. Jumbi
5. Kibojeu
6. Koani

1. Michamvi
2. Ndijani
3. Unguja Ukuu
4. Uzi
5. Uzini

== Notable people from Kati District ==
- Bi Kidude, musician
