= Makunduchi =

Town and district capital of Kusini District in Unguja South Region of Tanzania

Makunduchi Mji wa Makunduchi (Swahili)
- Town of Kusini District
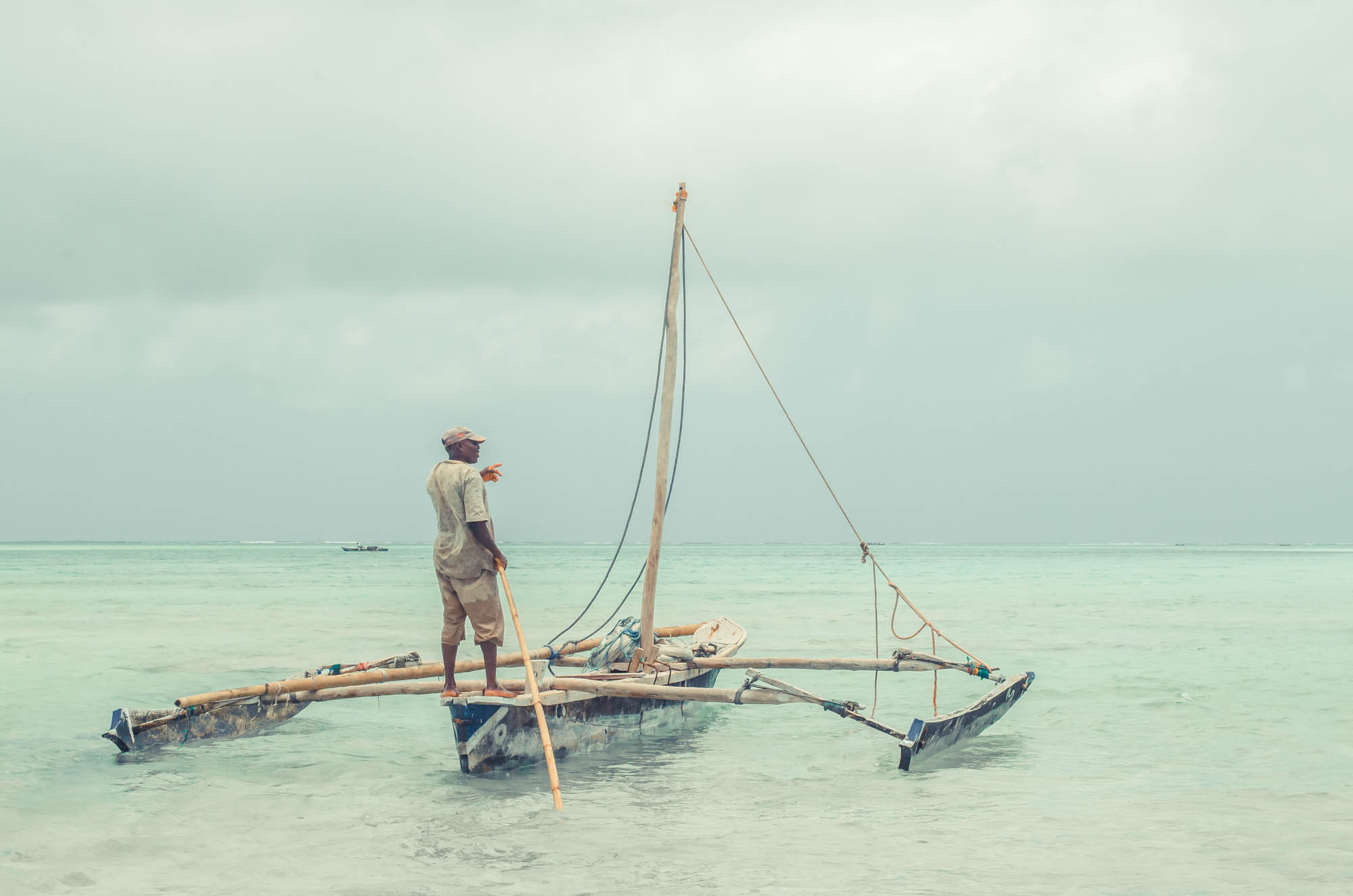
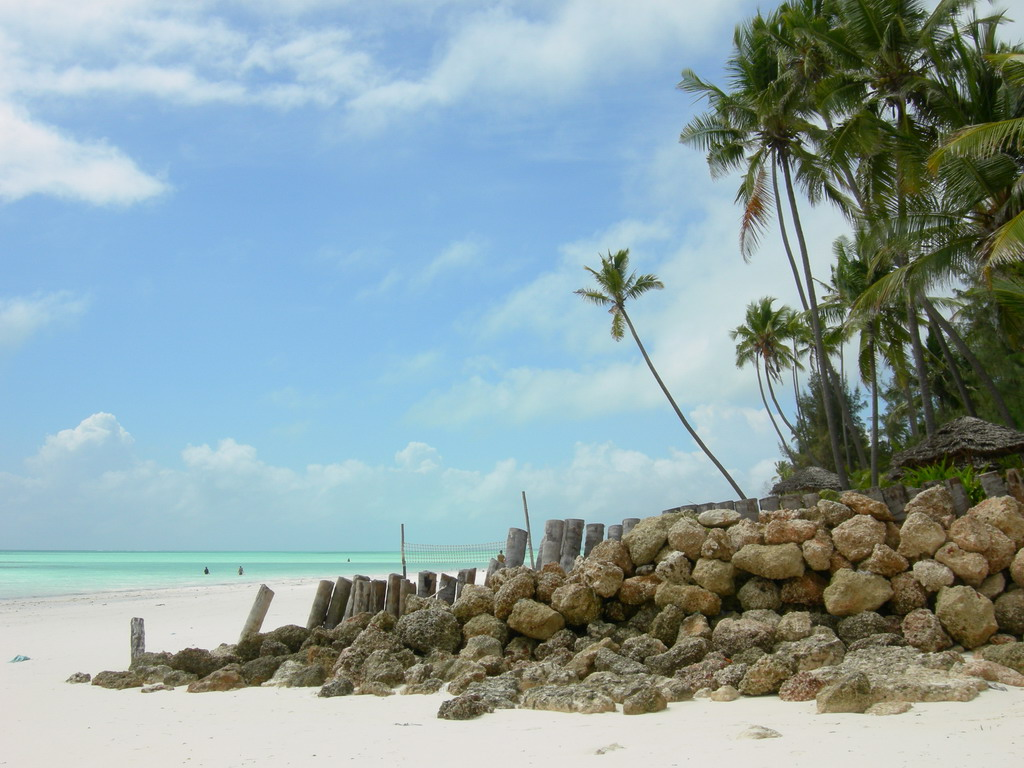
- From top to bottom: Metepe fisherman at Makunduchi beach & rocks on beach in Makunduchi, Mtegani ward
- Nickname: Kunduchi of the islands
- Location within Tanzania
- Coordinates: 6°24′14.76″S 39°33′5.04″E
- Country: Tanzania
- Region: Unguja South Region
- District: Kusini District
- Demonym: Makunduchian

Ethnic groups
  - Settler: Swahili
  - Ancestral: Hadimu

Makunduchi (Mji wa Makunduchi in Swahili) is a historic town and district capital in the Kusini District of the Unguja South Region in Tanzania. It is located inside the Kajengwa ward, and Mtegani ward, occupying Kiongoni neighborhood, Nganani neighborhood and Kijini neighborhood. The town comprises two distinct settlements, about 2 km from each other, "Old Makunduchi" on the east and "New Makunduchi". Old Makunduchi is a small fishermen's village on the shore of the Indian Ocean with the Nganani mtaa (neighborhood), while New Makunduchi has some modern buildings, shops, as well as some blocks of flats that were built in the 1970s with the aid of East Germans in return for Tanzanian political support internationally. The town is also the birthplace and resting place for the 4th president of Zanzibar Idris Abdul Wakil. Makunduchi is also the birthplace of Samia Suluhu Hassan, the president of Tanzania. Other famous politicians for Makunduchi include Mohamed Gharib Bilal. Also famous novelist Muhammed Said Abdulla.

== History ==
The Wahadimu are the Zanzibar Island's original inhabitants, and Makunduchi's native residents. Their old settlement Makunduchi can still be found in the southeast of the island's shore. According to the Native Census of 1924 done by the British, a total of 3,911 people lived there: 1,190 adult males, 1,531 adult females, 615 boys, and 575 girls. There are 1,579 cottages in total. The residents claim that the name Makunduchi is derived from the name of the place they claim to have come from, which was called Kunduchi and was located on the mainland across from the island's southernmost portion.

Makunduchi was the only location in the Zanzibar Sultanate where camels were still used for transportation as of the 1920s. These are primarily owned by the Indians known as Makumbaro. Makunduchi is the only location having a settlement of these Indians, whose homes are in Cutch and Kathiawar, with the exception of a few in Zanzibar City. There are roughly thirty families of potters living there, and the word comes from the Sanskrit Kumbhakar. They coexist in harmony with the Wahadimu, and raise their children in the countryside. The kids can converse in Kihadimu as well as the locals. The fronds of the wild date palm are used by the ladies of Makunduchi and Jambiani to create colorful mats with a fringe. This fringe is not made on the mats of other villages and is known as Ndevu, meaning beard. In 1919 the British colonial office builds the Ras Makunduchi Lighthouse next to the historic settlement.

== Festivals ==
In addition to the practices followed, the natives of Zanzibar and Pemba continue to use the ancient solar calendar that they acquired from the Persians. The other Wahadimu, Watumbatu, and Wapemba celebrate New Year's Day customs that include putting out fires, scattering ashes at intersections, dusting floury ash against the exteriors of homes, taking ceremonial baths in the sea, and holding feasts.

The Makunduchi people also follow two other traditions; two persons are placed within a tiny banda made of dried coconut leaves. The cottage is then lit on fire, and stones are hurled into the fire. Although the two men are meant to stay inside, they sneak out the back of the shack. After that, the elderly men dance around the grave of a long-gone patriarch whose name has been lost.

Makunduchi is mostly known for the Mwaka Kogwa or Mwaka Koga ("show of the year") celebrations, of Shirazi and Swahili heritage, that take place in July/August to celebrate the New Year. In Mwaka Kogwa, a ritual battle is fought, at the end of which a hut is burned. Then, predictions are made for the new year, based on the direction taken by the smoke.

The original purpose of this festival was to invoke the assistance and protection of spirits in order to ensure the prosperity of the nation and its citizens. It was a component of a larger set of agrarian ceremonies. Only the Mwaka kogwa, or New Year's festivity, remains today. In recent years, this festival has increased in significance rather than decreased. Tours are organised to visit the festival and to explain and point out the customs.

== Economy ==
Makunduchi is a historical protected area in Zanzibar. It has a significant part of Tanzanian history both modern and ancient. Like much of the island, holiday and event tourism is a growing and major industry in the town. The first international tourism hotel was built in Makunduchi beach in 2006.

== See also ==
Historic Swahili Settlements
