= Muhammed Said Abdulla =

Tanzanian novelist (1918–1991)

Muhammad Said Abdulla
- Born: 25 April 1918; Makunduchi, Zanzibar
- Died: 1991 (aged 72–73)
- Occupations: journalist, novelist
- Writing career
- Language: Swahili
- Genre: detective fiction

Muhammed Said Abdulla or Abdullah (25 April 1918 – March 1991), was a Tanzanian Swahili novelist who is often credited as a pioneer of Swahili popular literature.

== Life ==
Muhammed Said Abdulla was born in historic Makunduchi, Zanzibar, to a Muslim family in modern day Kusini District of Unguja South Region. He received his secondary education at a missionary school, and after graduating in 1938, began working for the state Civil Health Department as an inspector. While there he served as editor for the Department of Agriculture's Swahili Bulletin. Abdulla then went into journalism; in 1948, he became editor of the newspaper Zanzibari. He later became assistant editor of Al-Falaq, Afrika Kwetu, and Al Mahda. From 1958 to his retirement in 1968, he served as editor of the agricultural magazine Mkulima.

Abdulla's family was killed during the Zanzibar Revolution in 1964.

== Literary career ==
In 1958, his fiction work Mzimu wa Watu wa Kale (Shrine of the Ancestors) won top honors at the Swahili Story-Writing Competition held by the East African Literature Bureau; the work was published as a novel in 1960. The novel was noted for breaking away from folktale traditions that were popular in Swahili literature at the time. Mzimu wa Watu wa Kale marked the first appearance of Bwana Msa, a detective character that features in most of his subsequent works. The character has drawn comparisons with Sherlock Holmes, as both were pipe-smoking detectives which solved cases using observation and deductive skills.

Abdulla published six detective novels featuring Bwana Msa between 1960 and 1984. The plots of Abdulla's later novels became progressively more and more complex and sophisticated – described as overcomplicated by some critics. These plots usually involved a protagonist who must battle ignorance and superstition in order to resolve the conflict.

Apart from detective novels, he also wrote Mke Mmoja Waume Watatu (1975), which deals with marital fraud, and a collection of short stories in "Hekaya za Burudisha".

== Works ==
- Shrine of the Ancestors (Mzimu wa Watu wa Kale), 1960
- The Well of Giningi (Kisima cha Giningi), 1968
- In the World There Are People (Duniani Kuna Watu), 1973
- The Secret of the Zero (Siri ya Sifuri), 1974
- One Wife, Three Husbands (Mke Mmoja Waume Watatu), 1975
- The Devil's Child is Taken Care of (Mwana wa Yungi Hulewa), 1976
- Bwana Msa's Mistake (Kosa la Bwana Msa), 1984

== Awards ==
- Swahili Story-writing Contest (1957–8) Mzimu wa Watu wa Kale
