= Kusini District =

District of Unguja South Region, Tanzania

Kusini District Wilaya ya Kusini (Swahili)
- District of South Zanzibar
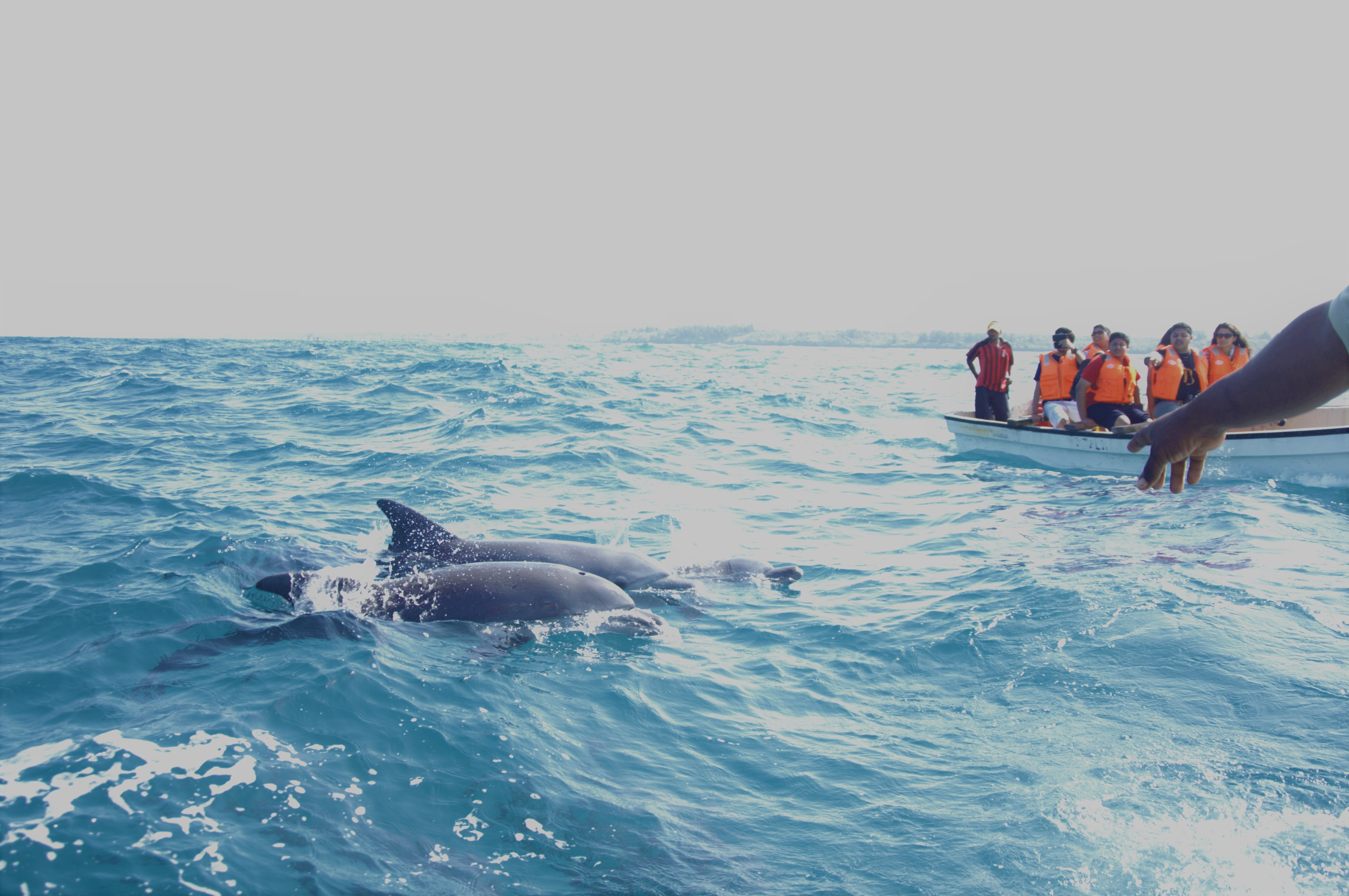
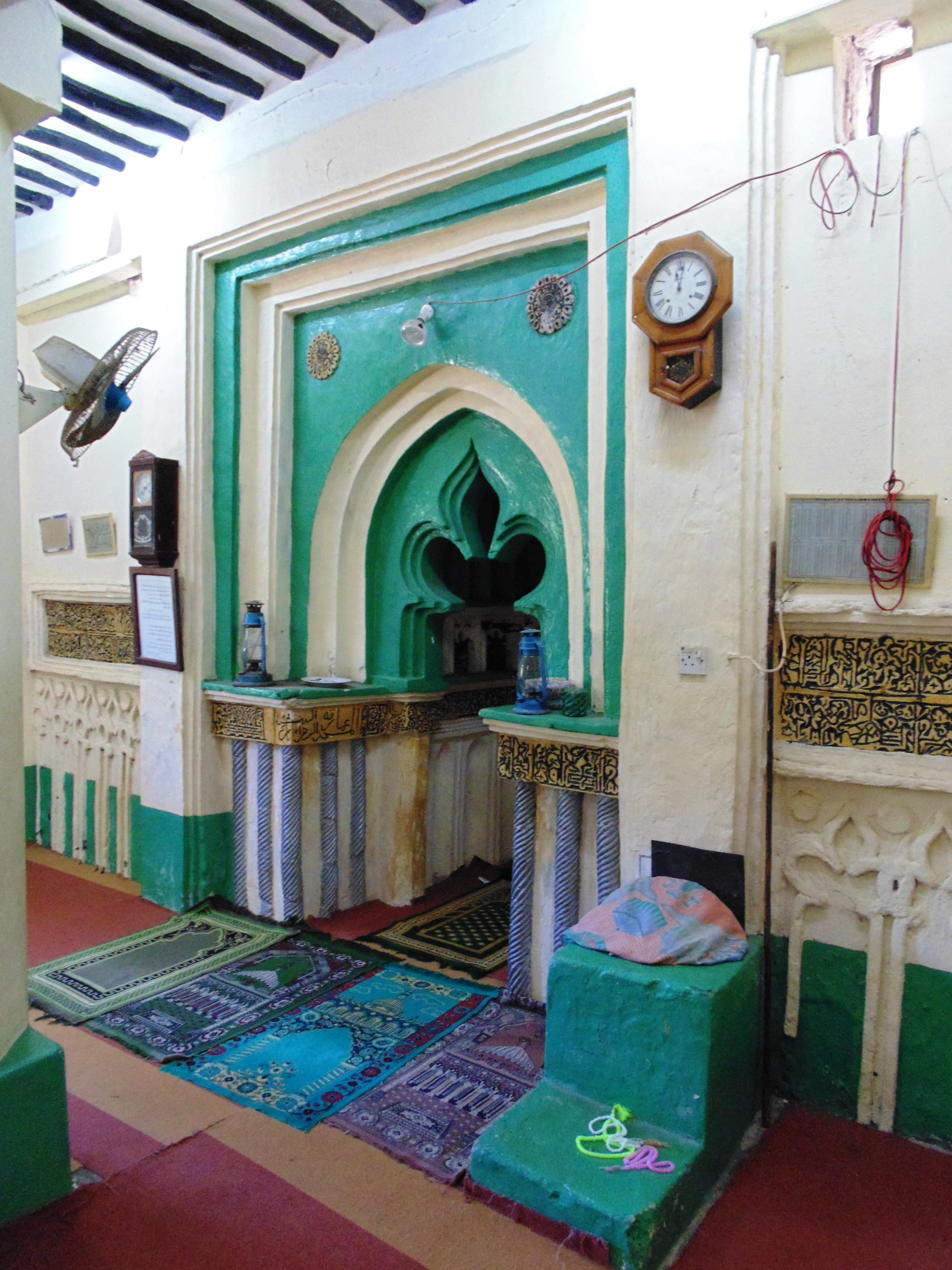
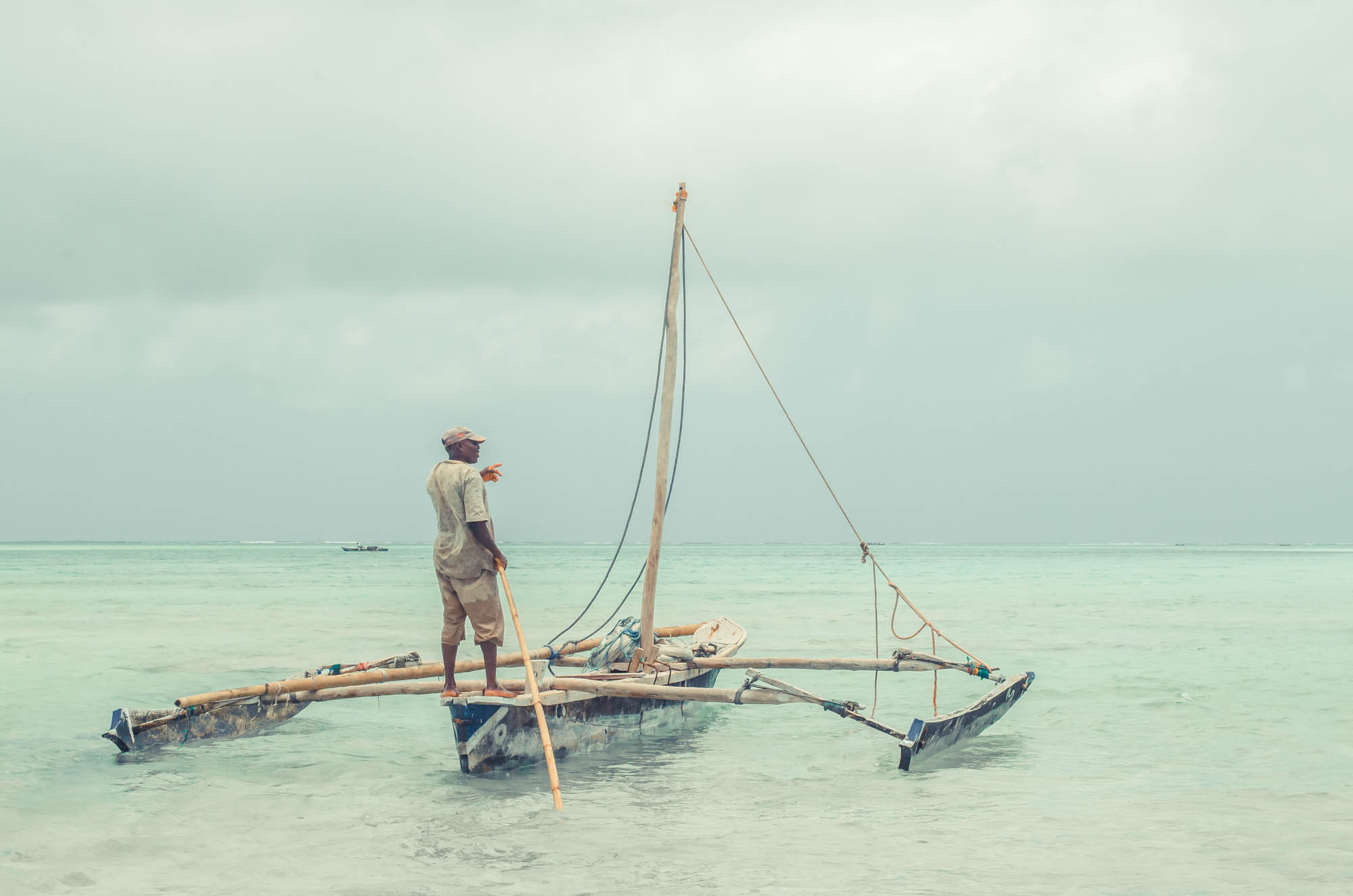
- From top to bottom: Spinner dolphins in Kizimkazi, historic Kizimkazi Mosque and Mtepe boat in Makunduchi
- Nickname: The dolphin coast
- Location in Unguja South
- Coordinates: 6°20′37.32″S 39°30′25.56″E
- Country: Tanzania
- Region: Unguja South Region
- Capital: Makunduchi

Area
  - Total: 379.5 km^{2} (146.5 sq mi)
  - Rank: 2nd in Unguja South
- Highest elevation (Kitongani ward): 254 m (833 ft)

Population (2022)
  - Total: 63,156
  - Rank: 2nd in Unguja South
  - Density: 166.4/km^{2} (431.0/sq mi)
- Demonym: South Zanzibari

Ethnic groups
  - Settler: Swahili
  - Native: Hadimu
- Time zone: UTC+3 (EAT)
- Tanzanian Postcode: 721xx
- Symbols of Tanzania
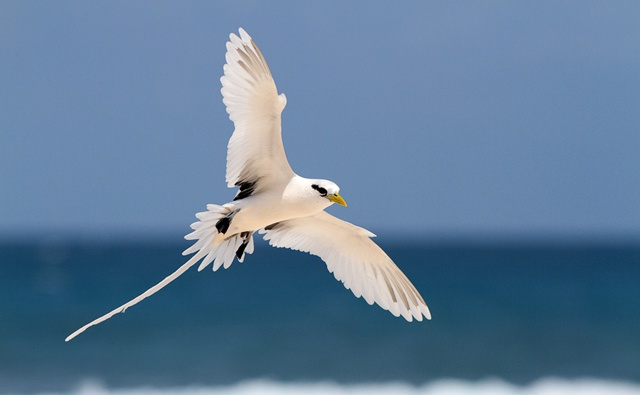
- Bird: White-tailed tropicbird

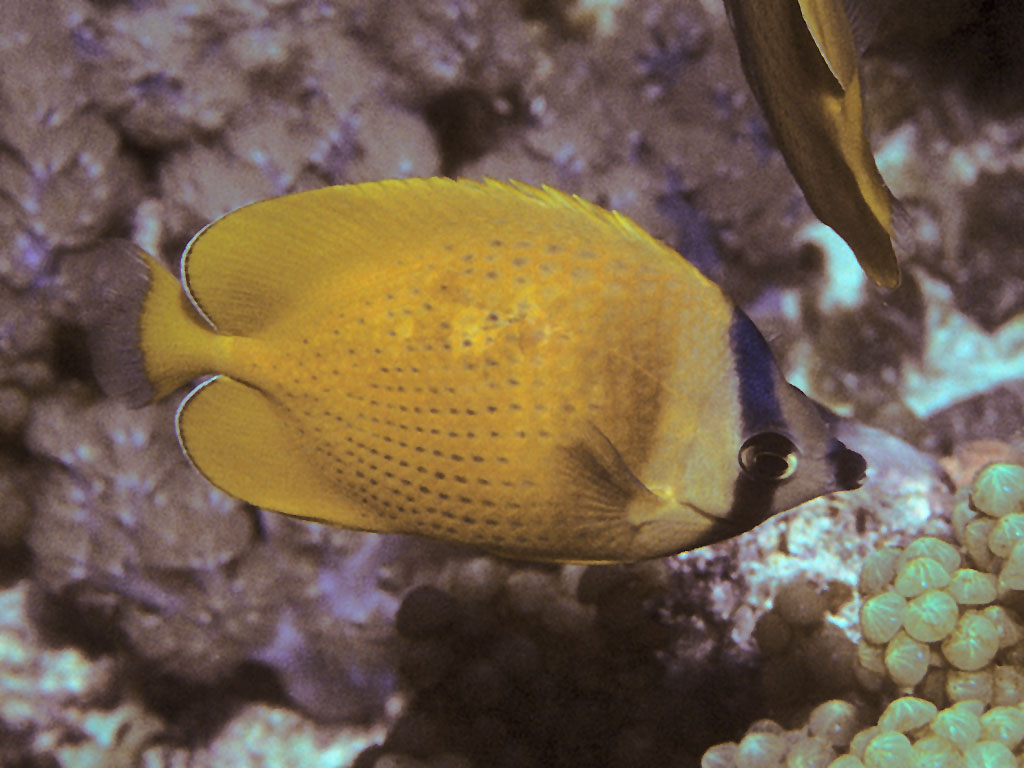
- Fish: Sunburst butterflyfish
- Mammal: Zanzibar servaline genet

Kusini District (Wilaya ya Kusini in Swahili) is one of two administrative districts of Unguja South Region of Tanzania. The district has a water border to the east, south and west by the Indian Ocean. Kati District borders the district to the north. The district covers an area of 379.5 km^{2} (146.5 sq mi). The district is comparable in size to the land area of Saint Vincent and the Grenadines. The administrative seat is the historic town of Makunduchi.The district is home to the oldest mosque in use in East Africa, the historic Kizimkazi Mosque, also a National Historic Site. The district is also frequently visited by Spinner dolphins, which is one of the biggest tourism attractions in the district. According to the 2022 census, the district has a total population of 63,156.

== Geography ==
The district covers a total area of 361.2 km2, of which 79% is coral and 21% is used for residential and agricultural purposes. As a result, the district's entire land area is divided among coral land, which covers 71.46 ha, arable land, which covers 8.2 ha, and Jozani Chwaka Bay National Park, which covers the remaining areas.

== Economy ==
The biggest source of income for Kusini District is tourism followed by fishing. The projected number of fishermen in the Kusini district is 3,745 (3086 men and 659 women), including 2167 vessel fishers. There are 25 landing areas in the district. 16 fisheries cooperative associations have been established by the district in the area of fisheries cooperative associations. As of 2018, there are seven fish farming ponds (2 for cold water and 5 for salt water), and another nine are being built.

Another significant economic activity in the district is seaweed farming, which employs 2800 people. However, seaweed production has decreased, from 643,333 kg in 2013 to 113,819 kg in 2017. Two centers for seaweed value addition have been established with the help of the district. Thirteen fisheries and sea weed Committees have been established by the Council in coordination with Shehia leadership to improve management of fishing operations. There are two methods used to store fish: using modern facilities and using conventional or native techniques (sun drying, salting, and smoking). However, the majority store their fish in the conventional manner.

A total of 34,864 ha make up the district, of which 13,967 ha are designated as alternative use areas, 9693 ha as conservation areas, 1,0428 ha as utilization areas, and 776 ha as conservation reserves. There are 95 private forest nurseries and two government-owned nurseries. Participatory forest management has been used in the district to improve the management of natural resources. There are 14 village natural resource management committees that are operational. There are currently five village committees being established in Nganani, Kijini, Mzuri, Kiongoni, and Tasani.

== Administrative subdivisions ==
As of 2012, Kusini District was administratively divided into 10 wards. by 2016 they were increased to 11.

=== Wards ===
1. Bwejuu
2. Kajengwa
3. Kibigija
4. Kikadini
5. Kizimkazi

1. Mtegani
2. Mtende
3. Muungoni
4. Muyuni
5. Nganani
6. Mzuri
7. Paje

== Education and Health ==
There are a total of 53 schools in the Kusini District Council, comprising 29 public and 24 private schools. 14,288 children are enrolled in schools, 7156 of whom are boys and 7132 of whom are girls. Pre-primary, primary, and secondary enrolment rates are 67.2%, 93.3%, and 61.7%, respectively, in 2018–19.

With 83 pupils (71 female and 12 male), the district's five adult education programs total 83 students. With 186 female members, there are six scientific plan groups in six Shehias: Kizimkazi Mkunguni, Paje, Kajengwa, Kijini, Tasani, and Mzuri. The groups work on making soap and custom clothing. For form II and form IV graduates, Makunduchi Secondary School has a continuous education center. 45 pupils are enrolled at the center right now (15 female and 30 male). There are 712 teachers employed by the council, 339 of them are men and 373 of whom are women. The ratio of students to teachers in the council ranges from 20 to 45.

== Notable people from Kusini District ==
- Samia Suluhu Hassan, President
- Mohamed Gharib Bilal, politician
- Muhammed Said Abdulla, novelist
