= Kizimkazi =

Fishing village on the southern coast of Zanzibar, Tanzania

Coordinates: 6°27′S 39°28′E

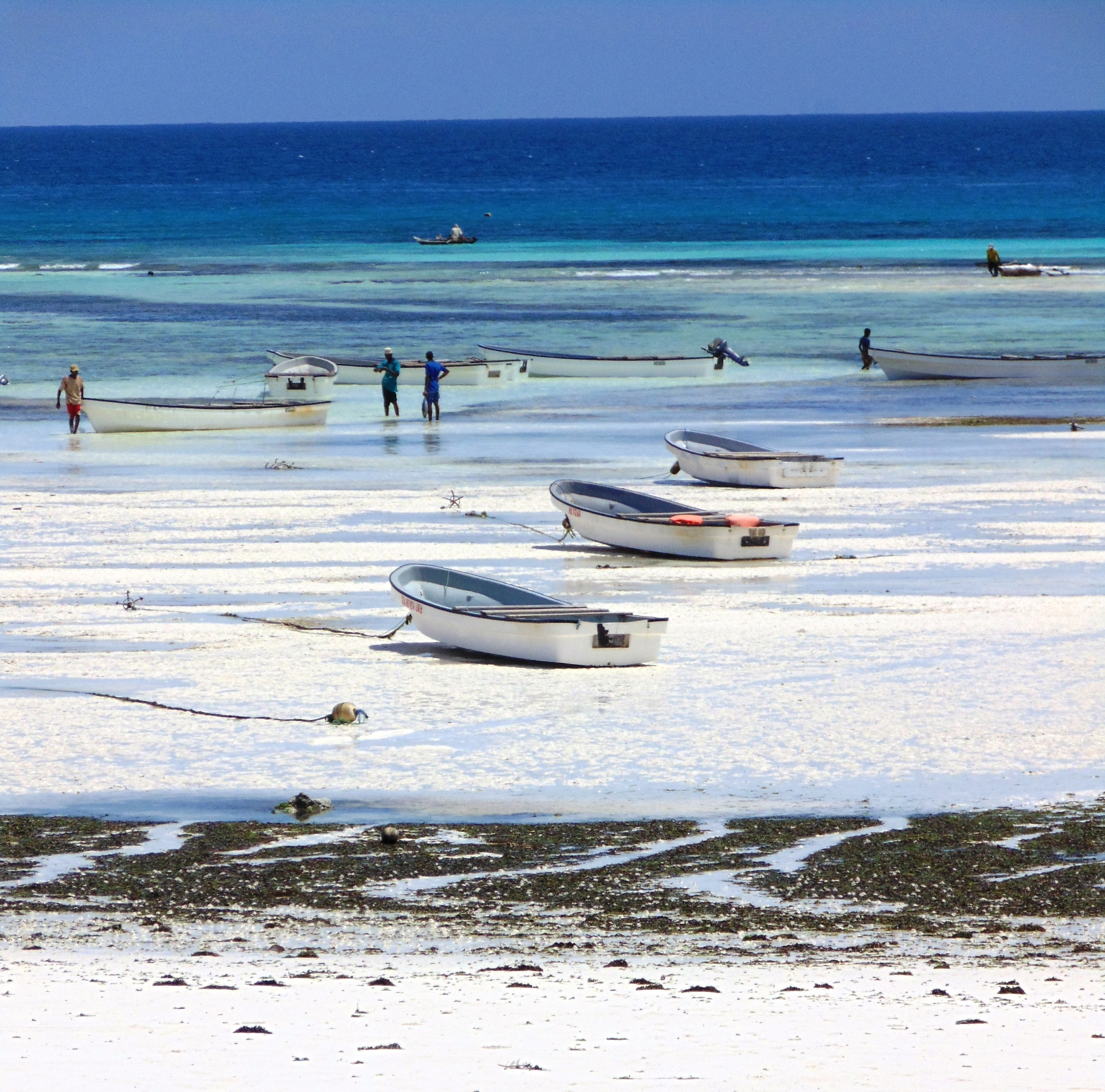
Kizimkazi

Kizimkazi - officially Kizimkazi Mkunguni, but also known as Kizimkazi Mtendeni - is a fishing village in Unguja South Region on the southern coast of Zanzibar, Tanzania, and was once a walled city. It is situated 4.8 km (3.0 mi) southeast of the Kizimkazi Mosque (which is located in Kizimkazi Dimbani, commonly known just as Dimbani). In recent years, Kizimkazi has become a major tourist attraction, as daily boat tours are organized to bring visitors off shore to watch bottlenose dolphins and swim with them.

== Notable residents ==
- Hafidh Ameir Hassan - Agriculturist, former First Gentleman of Tanzania (2021–2026), and late husband of President Samia Suluhu Hassan
- Samia Suluhu Hassan - President of Tanzania since 2021

== See also ==
Historic Swahili Settlements
