= Janeth Magufuli =

5th First Lady of Tanzania

5th First Lady of Tanzania
- In role 5 November 2015 – 17 March 2021
- President: John Magufuli
- Preceded by: Salma Kikwete
- Succeeded by: Hafidh Ameir Hassan (as first gentleman)

Personal details
- Born: 1960 (age 65–66) Tanzania
- Party: CCM
- Spouse: John Magufuli (died 2021)
- Children: 7
- Parent: Juliana Stephano Kidaso (mother)
- Profession: Teacher

Janeth Magufuli (born 1960) is a Tanzanian educator who was First Lady of Tanzania from 2015 to 2021 as the wife of president John Magufuli.

Magufuli originally worked as a primary school teacher for more than twenty years.

Honorary titles
Preceded by Salma Kikwete	First Lady of Tanzania; 2015–2021	Succeeded by Hafidh Ameir Hassan as First Gentleman
