= Maria Nyerere =

First Lady of Tanzania from 1964 to 1985

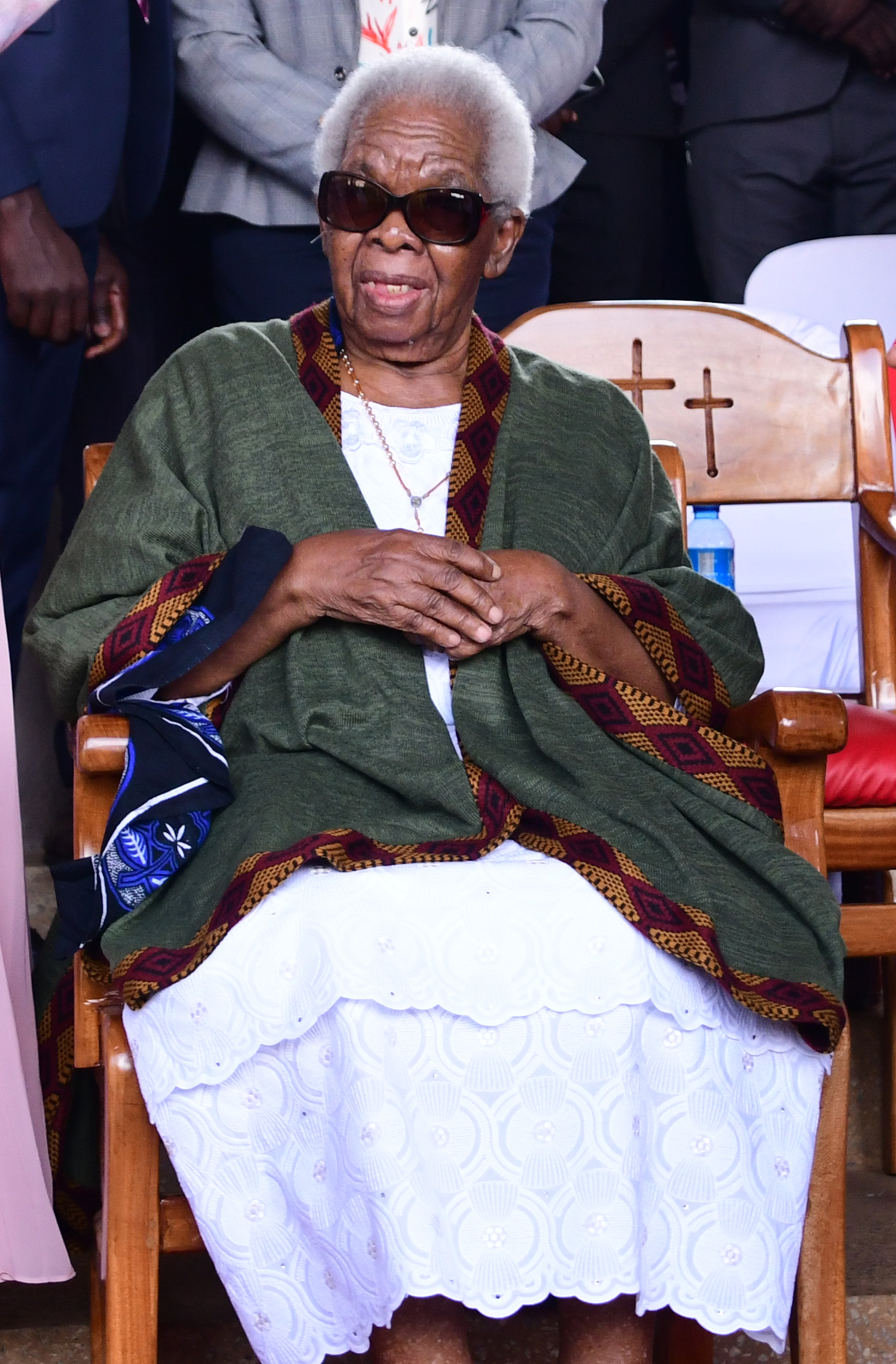
- Nyerere in 2024

1st First Lady of Tanzania
- In role 29 October 1964 – 5 November 1985
- Preceded by: Role established
- Succeeded by: Siti Mwinyi

First Lady of Tanganyika
- In role 9 December 1962 – 25 April 1964

Personal details
- Born: Maria Waningu Gabriel Magige; 31 December 1930 (age 95) Tanganyika
- Spouse: Julius Nyerere (m. 1953; died 1999)
- Children: 7: Andrew; Anna; Magige; John; Makongoro; Madaraka; Rosemary
- Profession: Teacher

Maria Nyerere (born Maria Waningu Gabriel Magige; 31 December 1930) served as the inaugural First Lady of Tanzania from 1964 to 1985. She was the seventh of nine children of Mr. Gabriel Magige, of Baraki, Tareme and his wife Hannah Nyashiboha.

Nyerere was educated at the White Sisters' School at Nyegina and Ukerewe School. She was a boarding scholar at Sumve Teacher Training College in Mwanza, where she attained a teaching certificate and She began her work by teaching at Nyegina Primary School at Musoma.

In 1953 she married Julius Nyerere, who was then also a teacher. He became an activist and politician, co-founder and president of Tanzania.

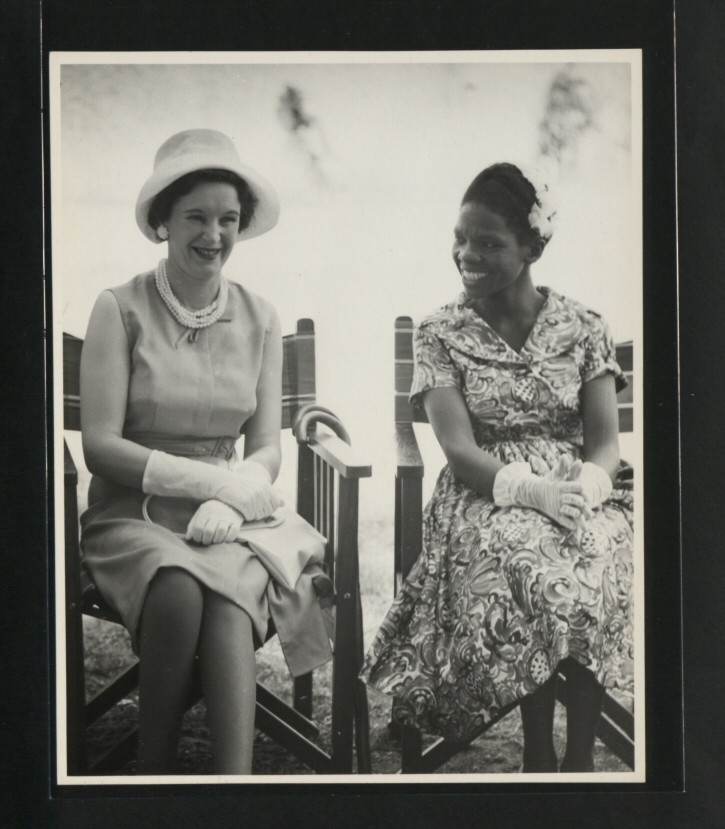
Nyerere (right) with Evelyn Macleod (left)

Nyerere currently serves as one of ten members of the council of elders of the Alliance for Tanzania Youth Economic Empowerment (Atyee), which also includes former Union President Ali Hassan Mwinyi and former Zanzibar President Amani Abeid Karume. She is commonly known as Mama Maria in the Tanzanian media.
