= Anna Mkapa =

First Lady of Tanzania from 1995 to 2005

3rd First Lady of Tanzania
- In role 23 November 1995 – 21 December 2005
- Preceded by: Siti Mwinyi
- Succeeded by: Salma Kikwete

Personal details
- Born: Anna Joseph Maro
- Spouse: Benjamin Mkapa
- Children: 3

Anna Mkapa (born Anna Joseph Maro) served as the third First Lady of Tanzania from 1995 to 2005. She is the widow of former President Benjamin Mkapa.

== First Lady of Tanzania (1995-2005) ==
As First Lady of Tanzania, Anna Mkapa was a strong advocate for improving the lives of children and women. In 1997, she founded the nonprofit Equal Opportunity for All Trust Fund (EOTF). She promoted women's economic, social, and political status. She helped female entrepreneurs, increased female representation in parliament, and ensured maternal healthcare and reproductive rights were included in the White Ribbon Alliance's healthcare initiative. The public affectionately referred to her as "Mama Mkapa" and "Dada (sister in Swahili) Mkapa".

== Honours and awards ==
=== Awards ===
- 1999: Graven Award by Wartburg College
- 2016: Order of the Smile Award

=== Honorary degrees ===
- Briar Cliff College, Honorary degree, 1999
- Wartburg College, Doctor of Humane Letters, 2002
