= First ladies and gentlemen of Tanzania =

First Gentleman of the United Republic of Tanzania
- Swahili: Mume wa Rais wa Tanzania
- Incumbent; Vacant since 7 September 2026
- Style: His Excellency (Formal); Swahili: Mheshimiwa Baba
- Residence: Ikulu, Dar es Salaam
- Inaugural holder: Maria Nyerere
- Formation: 1 November 1964

First Gentleman of Tanzania or First Lady of Tanzania is the unofficial title held by the husband or wife of the president of Tanzania. Until 19 March 2021, the position was held by women and thus referred to as First Lady until Hafidh Ameir Hassan, the husband of Samia Suluhu Hassan and the country's inaugural First Gentleman, took the role until his death in 2026.

Present and former Tanzanian first ladies are often affectionately called "Mama" within the country. In recent years, there has been public debate over the increasingly prominent role of the first ladies and gentlemen of Tanzania. There have been calls for Parliament to formalize the office of the first lady and first gentleman of Tanzania.

== First ladies and gentlemen of Tanzania ==
#	First Lady/First Gentleman Born/Died	Portrait	Date tenure began	Date tenure ended	President (Husband or wife)	Notes
1	Maria Nyerere (born 1930)		1 November 1964	5 November 1985	Julius Nyerere	
2	Siti Mwinyi (born 1932)		5 November 1985	23 November 1995	Ali Hassan Mwinyi	
3	Anna Mkapa (born ?)		23 November 1995	21 December 2005	Benjamin Mkapa	
4	Salma Kikwete (born 1963)		21 December 2005	5 November 2015	Jakaya Kikwete	
5	Janeth Magufuli (born 1960)		5 November 2015	17 March 2021	John Magufuli	
6	Hafidh Ameir Hassan (1946–2026)		19 March 2021	7 September 2026	Samia Suluhu Hassan	Tanzania's inaugural First Gentleman. Died on 7 September 2026.
