= Unguja South Region =

Region of Tanzania

Unguja South Region Mkoa wa Unguja Kusini (Swahili)
- Region
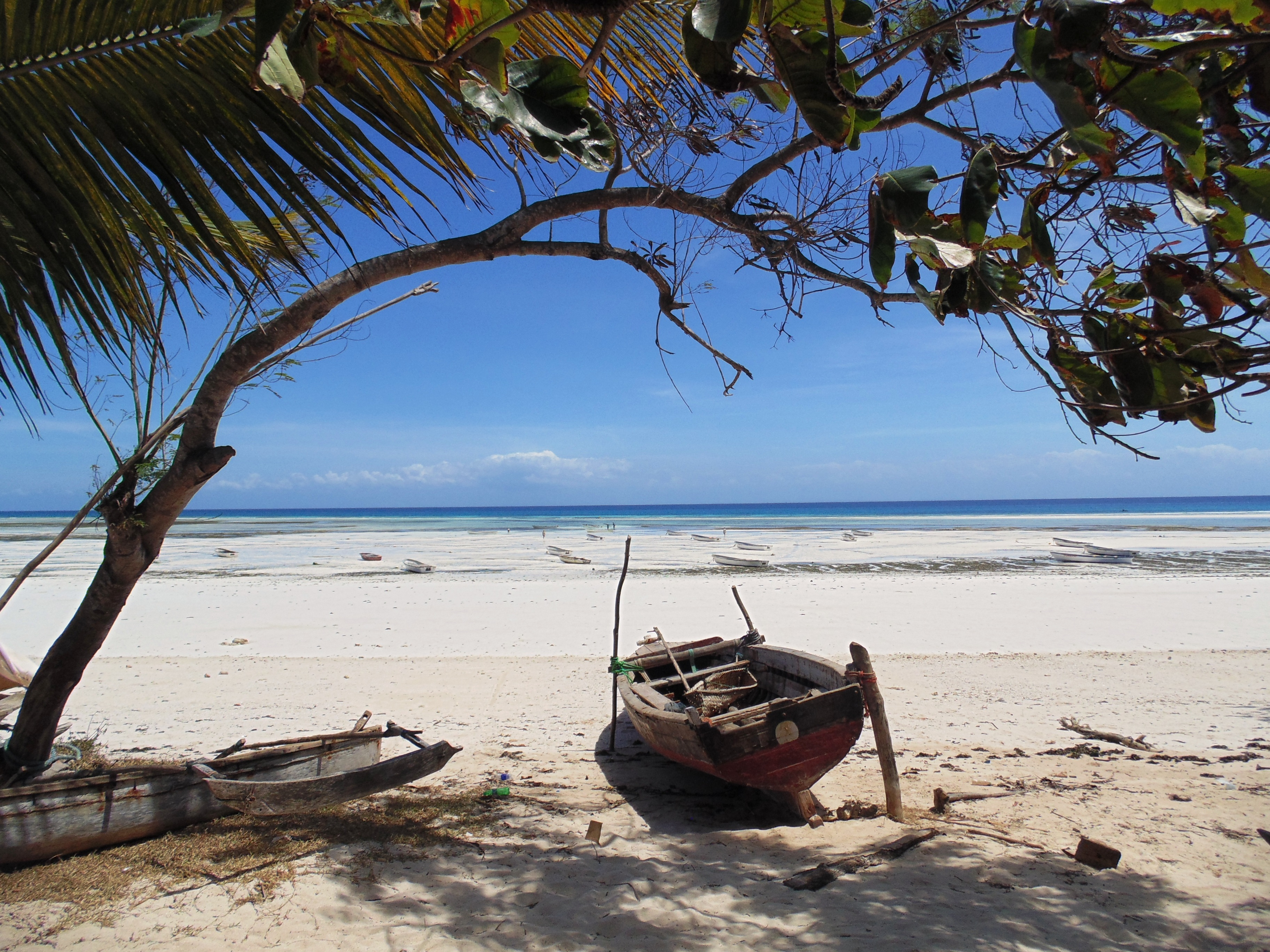
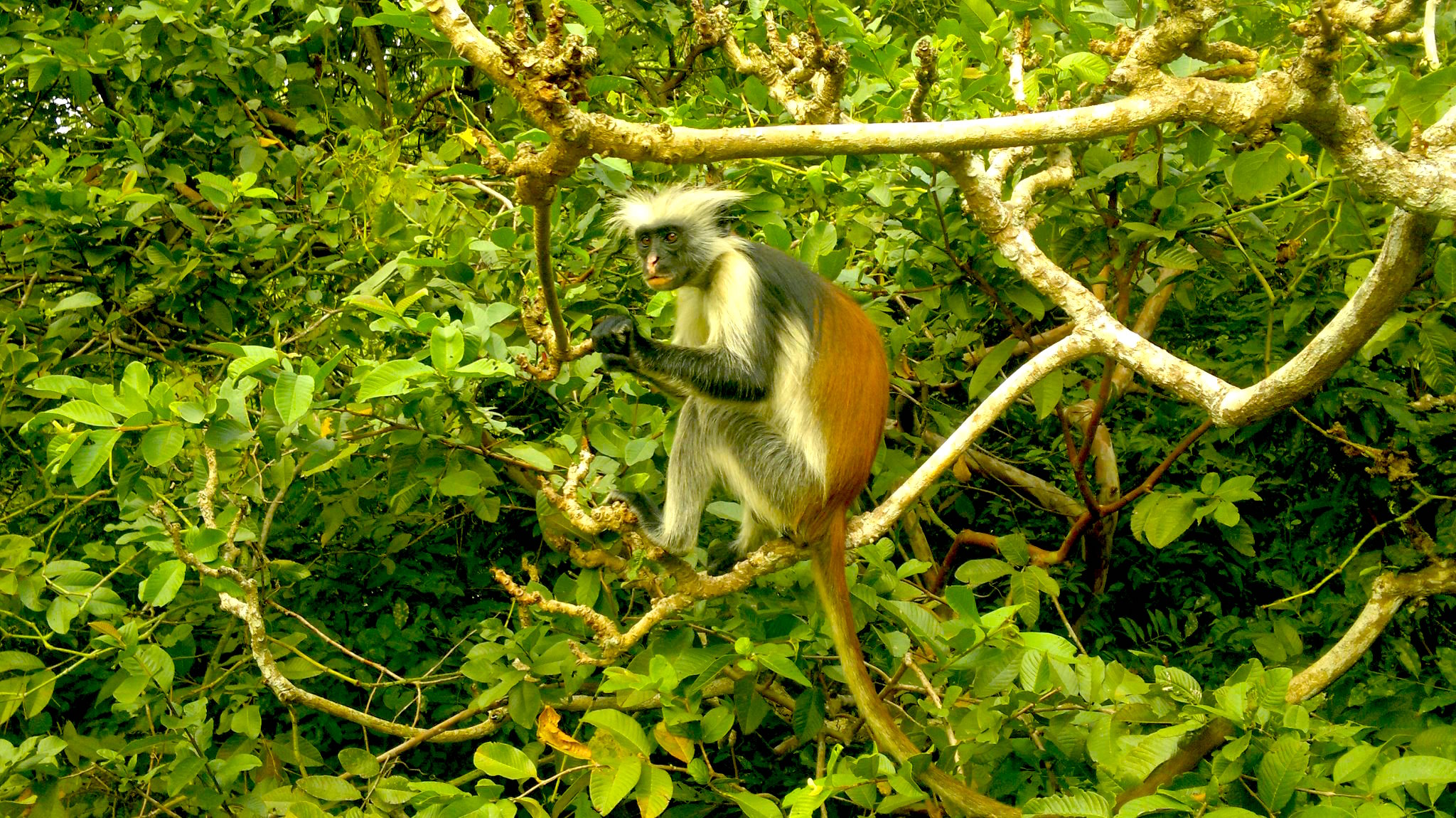
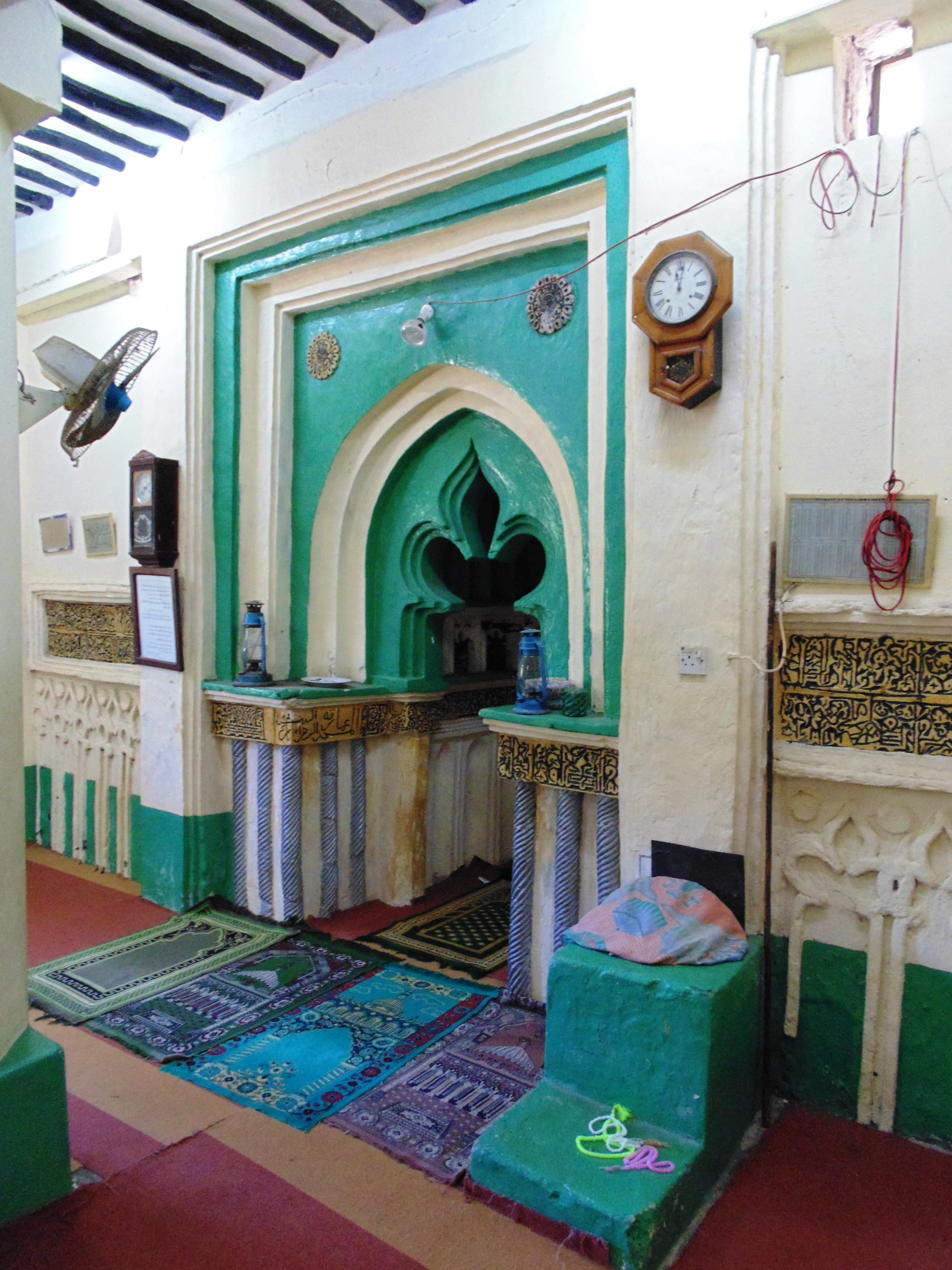
- From top to bottom: Kizimkazi scene, Kizimkazi Mosque & Red colobus in Jozani forest
- Nickname: Wild Zanzibar
- Location in Tanzania
- Coordinates: 6°15′51.48″S 39°26′42″E
- Country: Tanzania
- Named for: Unguja Island
- Capital: Koani
- Districts: List: Kati; Kusini

Area
  - Total: 854 km^{2} (330 sq mi)
  - Rank: 29th of 31

Population (2022)
  - Total: 195,873
  - Rank: 31st of 31
  - Density: 229/km^{2} (594/sq mi)
- Demonym: South Zanzibari

Ethnic groups
  - Settler: Swahili, Shirazi, Omani, Indians
  - Native: Hadimu
- Time zone: UTC+3 (EAT)
- Postcode: 72xxx
- Area code: 024
- ISO 3166 code: TZ-11
- HDI (2021): 0.639 medium · 4th
- Website: Official website
- Symbols of Tanzania
- Bird: Pemba white-eye
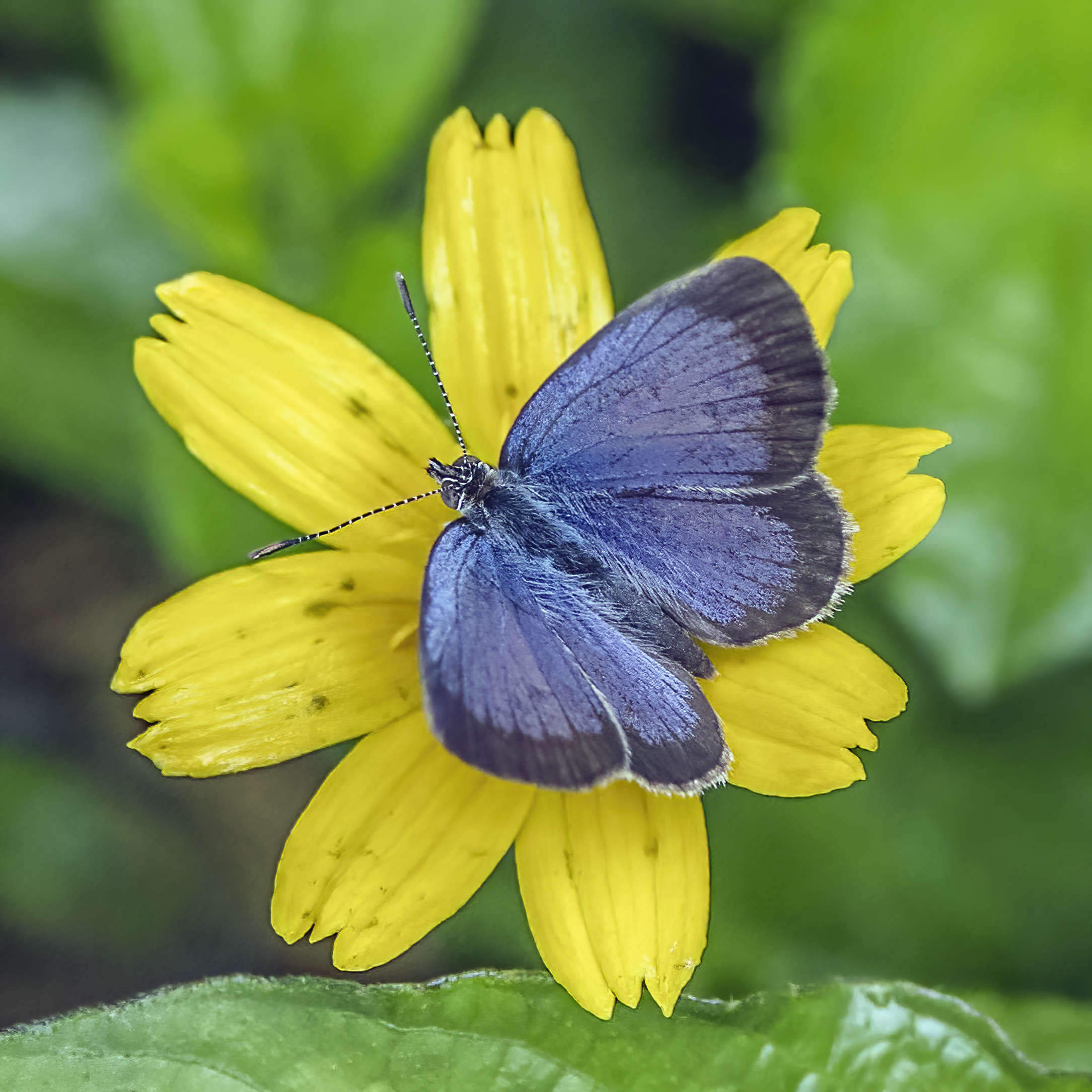
- Butterfly: African grass blue

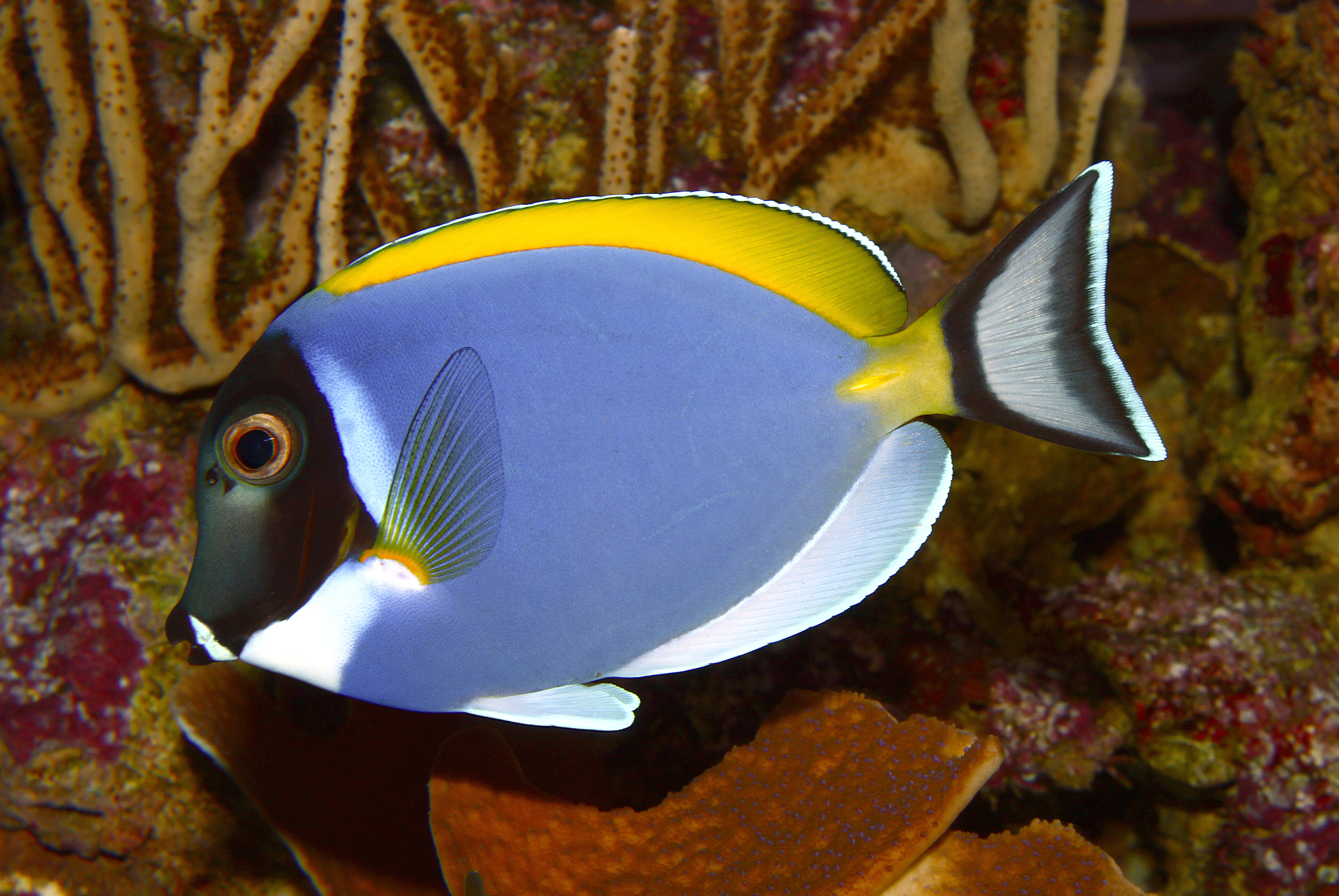
- Fish: Powder blue surgeonfish

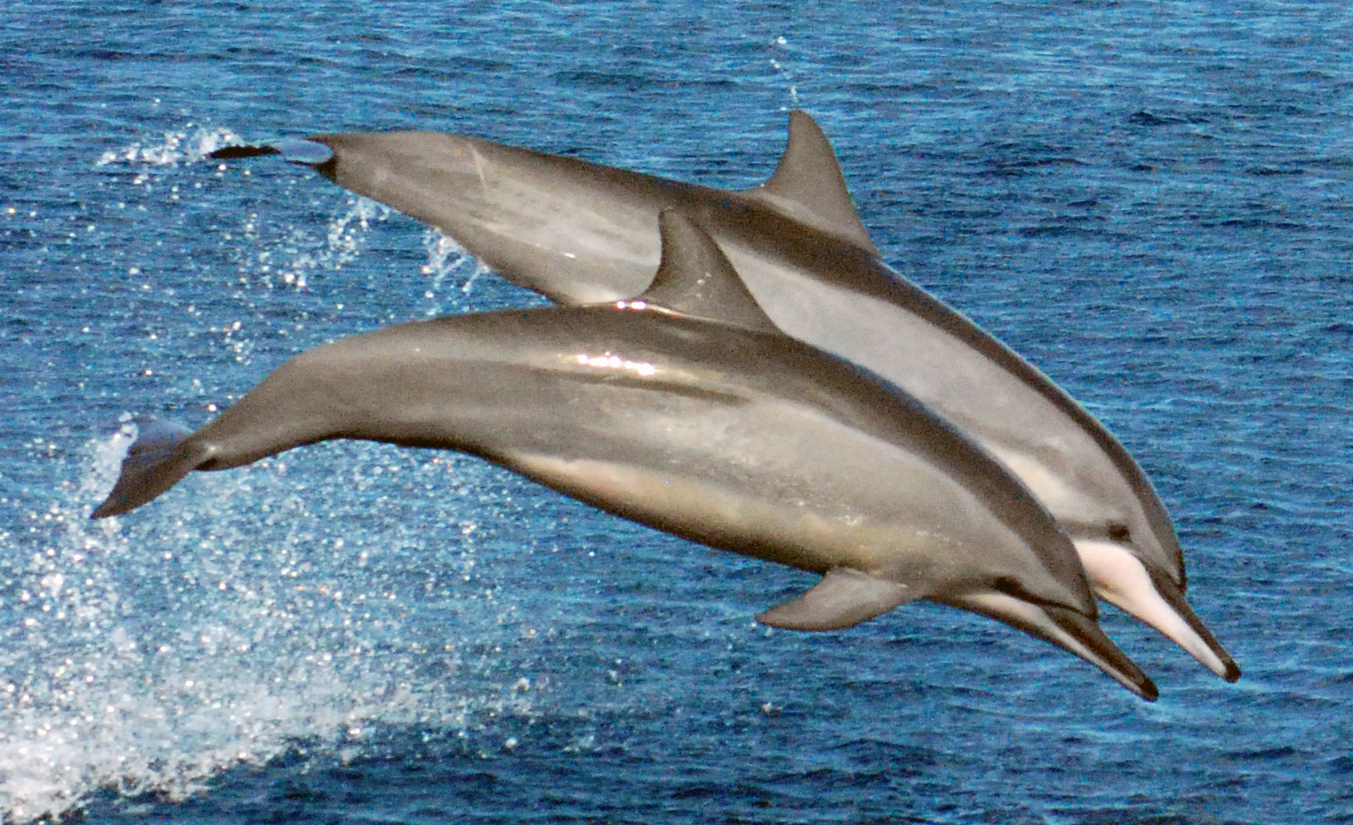
- Mammal: Spinner dolphin

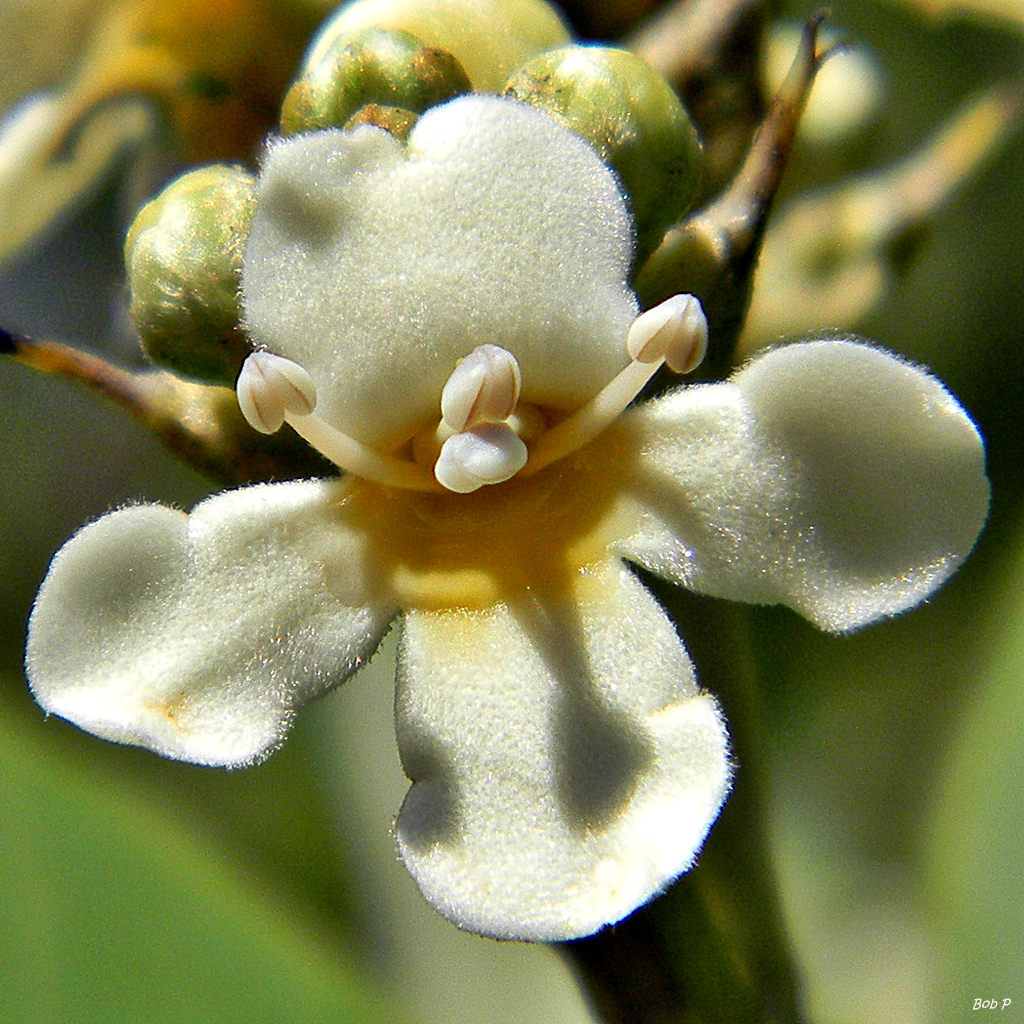
- Tree: Black mangrove

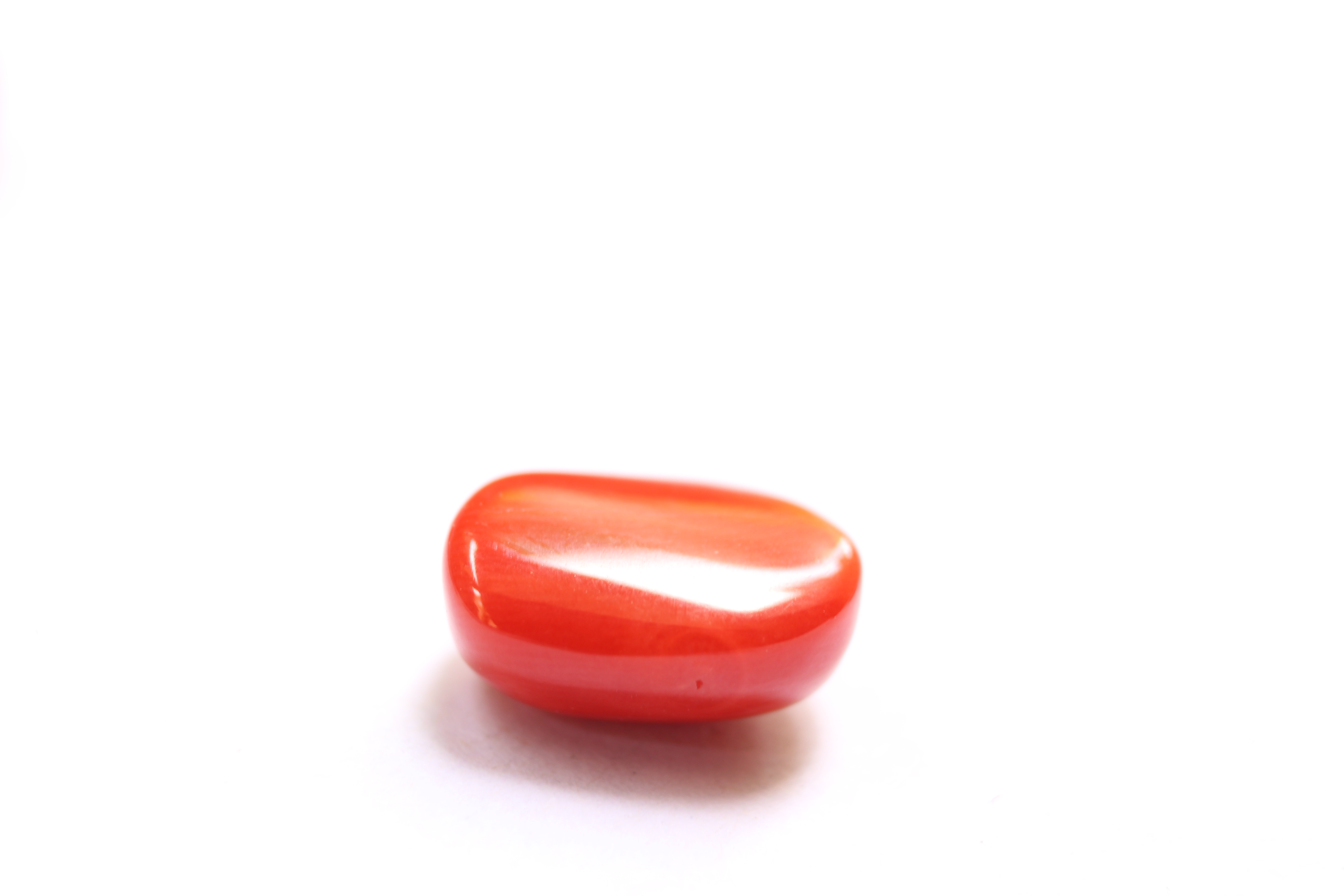
- Mineral: Coral

Unguja South Region, Zanzibar South Region or South Zanzibar Region (Mkoa wa Unguja Kusini in Swahili) is one of the 31 regions of Tanzania. The region covers an area of 854 km^{2} (330 sq mi). The region is comparable in size to the combined land area of the nation state of Kiribati. The administrative region is located entirely on the island of Zanzibar. Unguja South Region is bordered on three sides to the south by Indian Ocean, northeast by Unguja North Region and northwest by Mjini Magharibi Region. The regional capital is the town of Koani. Besides being known for its Spinner dolphin populations, the region is also home to the oldest mosque in East Africa, the Kizimkazi Mosque and also historic Makunduchi town. The region has the fourth highest HDI in the country, making one of the most developed regions in the country. According to the 2022 census, the region has a total population of 195,873.

== Geography ==
=== Geology ===
The geological area of Unguja Island that is on its southern and eastern sides shares a border with Unguja North Region to the north, and Unguja Urban West Region to the west. There aren't many rivers, but three major freshwater creeks that feed Chwaka Bay are surrounded by mangrove forests and expand into huge stretches of seagrass and calcareous Halimeda beds.4,934 acres of Unguja Island is covered with mangroves, the majority of which is in the South Unguja Region, particularly the Uzi Island complex in the south and the Chwaka Bay forest in the northeast. For many marine life forms, especially fish and crustaceans, the Chwaka Bay is crucial as spawning grounds and feeding grounds. There are a few clay-bound sands and gravels near to river-dominated areas, although biogenic and recent limestone origins are generally the dominant sediment types.

=== Coral reefs ===
The region is distinguished by a significant length of bordering reef that stretches from the region's northernmost point, where it borders with Unguja North, southward to the island's southwest, where it borders with West Region. These reefs are rather small in size and mostly comprise a reef flat and a reef slope. There are a few weak and small patch reefs in the lagoon on the landward of this bordering reef. The Menai Bay in the western part of the region is an exception, since it contains a number of small islands and sand banks with several patch reefs on the sheltered side and diverse formations of bordering reefs around the islands, particularly on the sides that are exposed to high seas.Pungume, Mianembe, Komunda, and Miwi Islets are some of Unguja South Region's reefs.

=== Temperature and precipitation ===
In the coastal plains, the climate is hot and muggy, whereas in the highlands, it is temperate. The highest monthly means are between 31.6 °C and 33 °C during the hot season from December to March, when the temperatures only drop to 23.5 °C to 24.1 °C. The data on average monthly temperatures from Zanzibar weather station (Zanzibar Airport) between 1986 and 2012 show ranges from a low of around 20.5 °C during the coolest months of August and September, when maximum temperatures are 29.1 °C and 30.3 °C for those months. The minimum relative humidity during the dry season (July to September) is 60%. Relative humidity ranges from 87% in April to 76% in November.

Over the period of 1987 to 2012, the nearest weather station at Zanzibar Airport recorded an average annual rainfall of 1,583 mm (ranging from 704 mm to 2,459 mm), with monthly rainfall peaks in April and May (the main wet season), when 641 mm of rain fell during those two months, and November to December (the short rains), when over 375 mm of rain fell. This rainfall pattern is clearly predominantly bi-modal.

== Economy ==
The people of the Unguja South Region participate in a variety of economic activities, with farming, fishing, tourism, seaweed farming, retail trade, and employment in the government among the major ones. The region's two main industries, farming and fishing, employ roughly 26% and 23% of the labor force, respectively. Tourism employs 14.5%, seaweed farming employs 24.5%, and all other activities combined employ 10.3%.

=== Infrastructure ===
The Region is connected to adjacent areas and to the entire Unguja Island by a decent network of tarmac roads. A number of feeder roads exist. Almost every village has a road that leads to it, with varying degrees of accessibility throughout the year. There aren't many feeder roads that are challenging to maneuver when it rains. Since there are numerous phone towers in this area and all major mobile phone operators have networks there, the coverage is adequate.

=== Agriculture ===
On the entire Unguja Island (or roughly 34% of the entire island), there are 528 km2 of agricultural land. Coconut, cloves, maize (678 ha), paddy (1813 ha), sorghum (228 ha), seaweed (142 ha), sweet potatoes (1955 ha), yams (789 ha), cocoyam (358 ha), and cassava (4,248 ha) are the main crops grown in the Unguja South region, according to the 2007/8 agricultural census. Other crops grown include okra, cabbage, bitter aubergine, radish, cowpeas, green peas, and many kinds of vegetables. 4,488 people work as seaweed farmers in the Unguja South region, largely in coastal communities on the district's eastern beaches, primarily in the communities near Chwaka Bay and as far south as Paje and Jambiani.

The Unguja South region has roughly 33,003 cattle, 20,915 goats, 155,063 chickens, 3,900 ducks, and minor numbers of other species of livestock, making livestock rearing another significant agricultural activity.

In the South Unguja Region, fishing is the third-largest industry after agriculture and tourism, employing 3,360 fishermen in addition to 1,681 foot fishers. In 2009, the South region's annual capture of fishery products was 3,331 tons, of which 1,535 tons were collected in the Kati District and 1,796 tons in the Kusini District. There are 1,386 different types of fishing boats total, including dinghy, dugout canoe, outrigger canoe, boats, and dhow.

=== Tourism ===
Beaches and hotels of all classes and standards may be found in South Unguja Region, which is very well known for them. In the South Unguja Region, 13.3% of families work directly in the tourism industry, which includes jobs in direct sales, product sales, dolphin tourism (at Kizimkazi), handcraft production and sales, and tour guiding. Although handcrafting and some hotel jobs, particularly housekeeping, are predominately held by women, the business is largely controlled by men. Between June and November, humpback whale sightings in the Zanzibar Channel are frequently reported to be only a few miles offshore. Bottlenose and humpback dolphin sightings are also frequent near the Zanzibar Channel reefs. The almost 250 bottlenose dolphins that live off Kizimkazi contribute to the area's main tourist draw. The Jozani Forest Nature Reserve, which has been expanded to include Chwaka Bay, is home to the Red Colubus Monkey, Zanzibar Duiker, and maybe Zanzibar Leopard as well. On the entire Unguja Island, there are 756 km2 of woodland (representing about 49% of the island) and 42 km2 of natural forest (representing about 3%). Unguja's protected woods and woodlands are primarily found in the South, in Jozani-Chwaka Bay.

== Population ==
The first people in what is now Unguja South Region are the Hadimu, whom trace their ancestry to Pwani Region. Followed by the Swahili, Shirazi, Omani and Indian communities over the centuries. There are 115,588 people total in Unguja South Region, 57,708 females and 57,880 males. The region's population increased by more than 26% throughout the ten-year period, with an average annual growth rate of 2.33% between 2002 and 2012. From 104 people per square kilometer in 2002, the population density in the area increased to 131 people per square kilometer in 2012. 53.8% of people live in poverty in Unguja South, compared to a 49% total poverty incidence in Zanzibar (Zanzibar HBS, 2004/05). According to figures from 2006, 94.7% of males and 90.3% of women over the age of 15 were literate, while the under-five mortality rate in Unguja South was 114 (per 1,000 live births).

== Administrative divisions ==
=== Districts ===
Unguja South Region is divided into two districts, each administered by a council:

Districts of Unguja South Region
Map	District	Population (2022)
	Kati District	132,717
	Kusini District	63,156
	Total	195,873

=== Constituencies ===
For parliamentary elections, Tanzania is divided into constituencies. As of the 2010 elections Zanzibar Central/South Region had five constituencies:

- Kati District
  - Chwaka Constituency
  - Koani Constituency
  - Uzini Constituency
- Kusini District
  - Makunduchi Constituency
  - Muyuni Constituency

== Notable people from Unguja Kusini Region ==
- Samia Suluhu Hassan, 6th president of Tanzania
- Idris Abdul Wakil, 4th president of Zanzibar
- Mohamed Gharib Bilal, politician
- Muhammed Said Abdulla, novelist
- Bi Kidude, musician
