= Timeline of Zanzibar City =

Coordinates: 6.165833°S 39.199167°E

The following is a timeline of the history of Zanzibar City, Unguja island, Zanzibar, Tanzania. The city is composed of Ng'ambo and Stone Town. Until recently it was known as Zanzibar Town.

== Prior to 19th century ==
- 1700 – Old Fort of Zanzibar is built by Omanis (approximate date).
- 1710 – Queen Fatima in power.
- 1746 – "Arab garrison" installed in fort.
- 1753 – Fort "unsuccessfully attacked by Mazrui Arabs from Mombasa."
- 1784 – Zanzibar becomes part of Oman.

== 19th century ==
- 1822 – Moresby Treaty.
- 1828 – The sultan orders a particular portion of the land to be cultivated in to cloe plantations. This result in an expansion of slave import.
- 1830 – Mtoni Palace built near town.
- 1832 – Capital of the Sultanate of Muscat and Oman relocated to Zanzibar from Muscat, Oman by Said bin Sultan.
- 1836 – United States consulate established.
- 1841 – British consulate established.
- 1844 – French consulate established.
- 1845 – Hamerton Treaty.
- 1850 - Kidichi Baths built near town.
- 1856 – Majid bin Said of Zanzibar in power.
- 1870
  - Barghash ibn Said in power.
  - Population: 70,000 (approximate).
- 1872 - Cyclone.
- 1873 – Frere Treaty. British "forced the closure of the slave market."
- 1879 – Anglican Christ Church built.
- 1880 – Marhubi Palace built near town.
- 1883 – House of Wonders built.
- 1888 – Hamamni Persian Baths built.
- 1890 – British in power per Heligoland–Zanzibar Treaty.
  - The purchase and selling of slaves is prohibited; slavery itself is preserved.
- 1896 – 27 August: Anglo-Zanzibar War.
- 1897 – Slavery in Zanzibar abolished except in the case of concubines (abolished in 1909).
- 1898 – Catholic St. Joseph's Cathedral built.

== 20th century ==
- 1904 – Darajani Market building constructed.
- 1905
  - Bububu railway constructed.
  - Plague.
- 1909 – Slavery in Zanzibar fully abolished with the abolition of slave concubinage.
- 1910
  - Law courts built.
  - Population: 35,262.
- 1914 – 20 September: German SMS Königsberg sinks British HMS Pegasus in harbour.
- 1925 – Peace Memorial Museum established.
- 1928 - Rent strike in Ng'ambo.
- 1935 - Jubilee Gardens laid out.
- 1948
  - General strike.
  - Population: 45,284.
- 1957 – Afro-Shirazi Party headquartered in town.
- 1961 – June: Unrest.
- 1964
  - 12 January: Zanzibar Revolution; city becomes capital of People's Republic of Zanzibar and Pemba.
  - April: Sultanate of Zanzibar becomes part of the new United Republic of Tanzania.
  - City becomes capital of semiautonomous region of Zanzibar.
  - Mtoro Rehani becomes mayor.
- 1966 - Kikwajuni GDR housing built.
- 1972 - 7 April: Abeid Karume assassinated.
- 1973 - Television Zanzibar inaugurated.
- 1977 - Trains of Michenzani (housing) built (approximate date).
- 1985
  - Economic liberalization begins.
  - Population: 133,000 (estimate).
- 1994
  - Palace Museum established.
  - Stone Town Conservation Plan approved.
  - Old Dispensary building restored.
- 1997
  - Zanzibar International Film Festival founded.
  - Keele Square rehabilitated.
- 1999
  - Area of city: 1,600 hectares.
  - Population: 195,000 (estimate).
- 2000 – Stone Town designated a UNESCO World Heritage Site.

== 21st century ==
- 2004 – Sauti za Busara (music festival) begins.
- 2005 – Population: 220,000 (estimate).
- 2008 – 21 May – 19 June: 2008 Zanzibar power blackout.
- 2009–2010 – 10 December–March: Second Zanzibar power blackout
- 2009 – Forodhani Gardens rehabilitated.
- 2012 – Anti-government protests.
- 2013 – August: Two 18-year-old, British volunteer teachers, Katie Gee and Kirstie Trup, were injured by an acid attack by men on a motorcycle near Stone Town.
- 2014 – June: Mosque bombed.

== See also ==
- History of Stone Town
- History of Ng'ambo
- Wards of Zanzibar City
- History of Zanzibar (islands)
- List of sultans of Zanzibar
- Zanzibar Urban/West Region (Zanzibar City is capital)
- List of football clubs in Zanzibar
- Timelines of other cities in Tanzania: Dar es Salaam

== Bibliography ==
Published in 19th century

- Edward Steere (1869), Some account of the town of Zanzibar, London: Charles Cull, OCLC 181102819, OL 23332973M
- Richard Burton (1872), "Zanzibar: city, island, and coast", Nature, 5 (122), London: Tinsley brothers: 338, Bibcode:1872Natur...5..338., doi:10.1038/005338a0, hdl:2027/mdp.39015020056217, OCLC 3816910, OL 23363070M, S2CID 39092274
- Karl Wilhelm Schmidt (1888), Sansibar: Ein ostafrikanisches Culturbild (in German), Leipzig: F.A. Brockhaus
- "Zanzibar". Handbook of British East Africa. London: War Office. 1893.
- Great Britain. Hydrographic Dept. (1897), "Zanzibar Town", Africa Pilot (6th ed.), London

Published in 20th century

- Robert Nunez Lyne (1905), Zanzibar in contemporary times, London: Hurst and Blackett, OL 17935092M
- Chisholm, Hugh, ed. (1910). "Zanzibar (seaport)" . Encyclopædia Britannica. Vol. 28 (11th ed.). Cambridge University Press. pp. 958–959.
- "Sansibar". Deutsches Kolonial-Lexikon (in German). 1920 – via Universitätsbibliothek Frankfurt.
- F.B. Pearce (1920), Zanzibar: the island metropolis of eastern Africa, London: T.F. Unwin, OL 13518480M
- "Zanzibar". The Red Book 1922–23: Handbook and Directory for Kenya Colony and Protectorate, Uganda Protectorate, Tanganyika Territory, and Zanzibar Sultanate. Nairobi: East Africa Standard Ltd. 1922. hdl:2027/inu.30000125593750.
- "Zanzibar". Encyclopaedia of Islam. E.J. Brill. 1936. p. 1214+. ISBN 9789004097940.
- "Clove-Scented Zanzibar", National Geographic Magazine, vol. 101, Washington DC, 1952
- Nancy Ingram Nooter (1984). "Zanzibar Doors". African Arts. 17.
- Garth A. Myers (1994), "Making the Socialist City of Zanzibar", Geographical Review, 84 (4): 451–464, doi:10.2307/215759, JSTOR 215759
- Andrew Petersen (1996). "Zanzibar". Dictionary of Islamic Architecture. Routledge. p. 316. ISBN 978-1-134-61366-3.
- Noelle Watson, ed. (1996). "Zanzibar". International Dictionary of Historic Places: Middle East and Africa. UK: Routledge. pp. 723–728. ISBN 1884964036.
- Laura Fair (1997). "Kickin' It: Leisure, Politics and Football in Colonial Zanzibar, 1900s–1950s". Africa: Journal of the International African Institute. 67.
- Garth Andrew Myers (1997). "Sticks and Stones: Colonialism and Zanzibari Housing". Africa: Journal of the International African Institute. 67 (2): 252–272. doi:10.2307/1161444. JSTOR 1161444. S2CID 146516949.
- Mary Fitzpatrick (1999), "Unguja (Zanzibar Island)", Tanzania, Zanzibar & Pemba, Lonely Planet, p. 148+, ISBN 9780864427267, OL 8314875M
- Francesco Siravo (1999). "Zanzibar: A Plan for the Historic Stone Town". Environmental Design: Journal of the Islamic Environmental Design Research Centre. Archived from the original on 3 July 2013.

Published in 21st century

- Jørgen Andreasen (2001). "The legacy of mobilisation from above: participation in a Zanzibar neighbourhood". In Arne Tostensen; et al. (eds.). Associational Life in African Cities: Popular Responses to the Urban Crisis. Sweden: Nordiska Afrikainstitutet. ISBN 978-91-7106-465-3.
- Brian Hoyle (2002). "Urban Waterfront Revitalization in Developing Countries: The Example of Zanzibar's Stone Town". Geographical Journal. 168.
- Paul Tiyambe Zeleza; Dickson Eyoh, eds. (2003). "Zanzibar, Tanzania". Encyclopedia of Twentieth-Century African History. Routledge. ISBN 0415234794.
- Kevin Shillington, ed. (2005). "Zanzibar (City)". Encyclopedia of African History. Fitzroy Dearborn. ISBN 978-1-57958-245-6.
- Bruce E. Stanley; Michael R.T. Dumper, eds. (2008), "Zanzibar", Cities of the Middle East and North Africa, Santa Barbara, USA: ABC-CLIO
