= Darajani Market =

Coordinates: 6.1621°S 39.1935°E

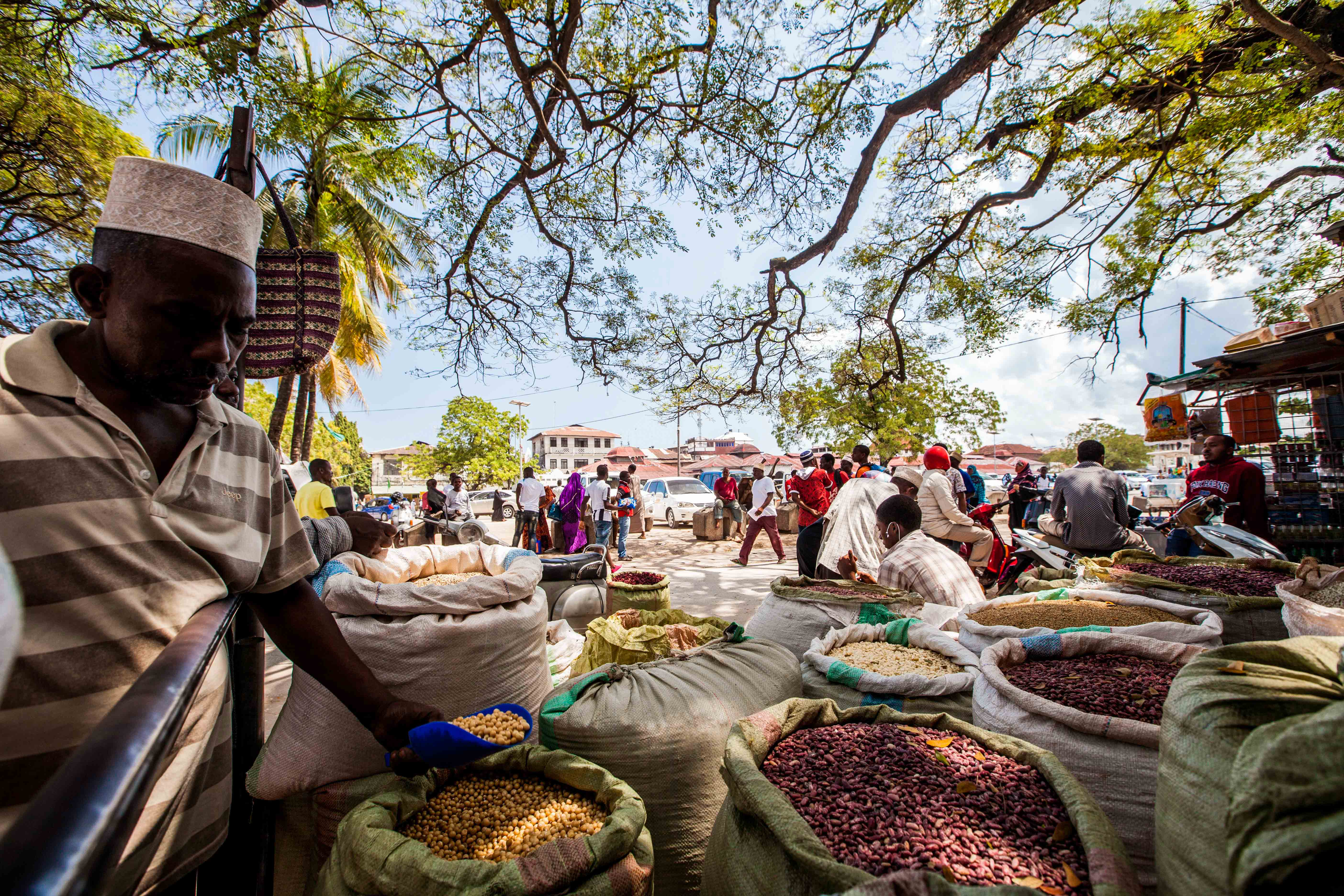
Darajani Market

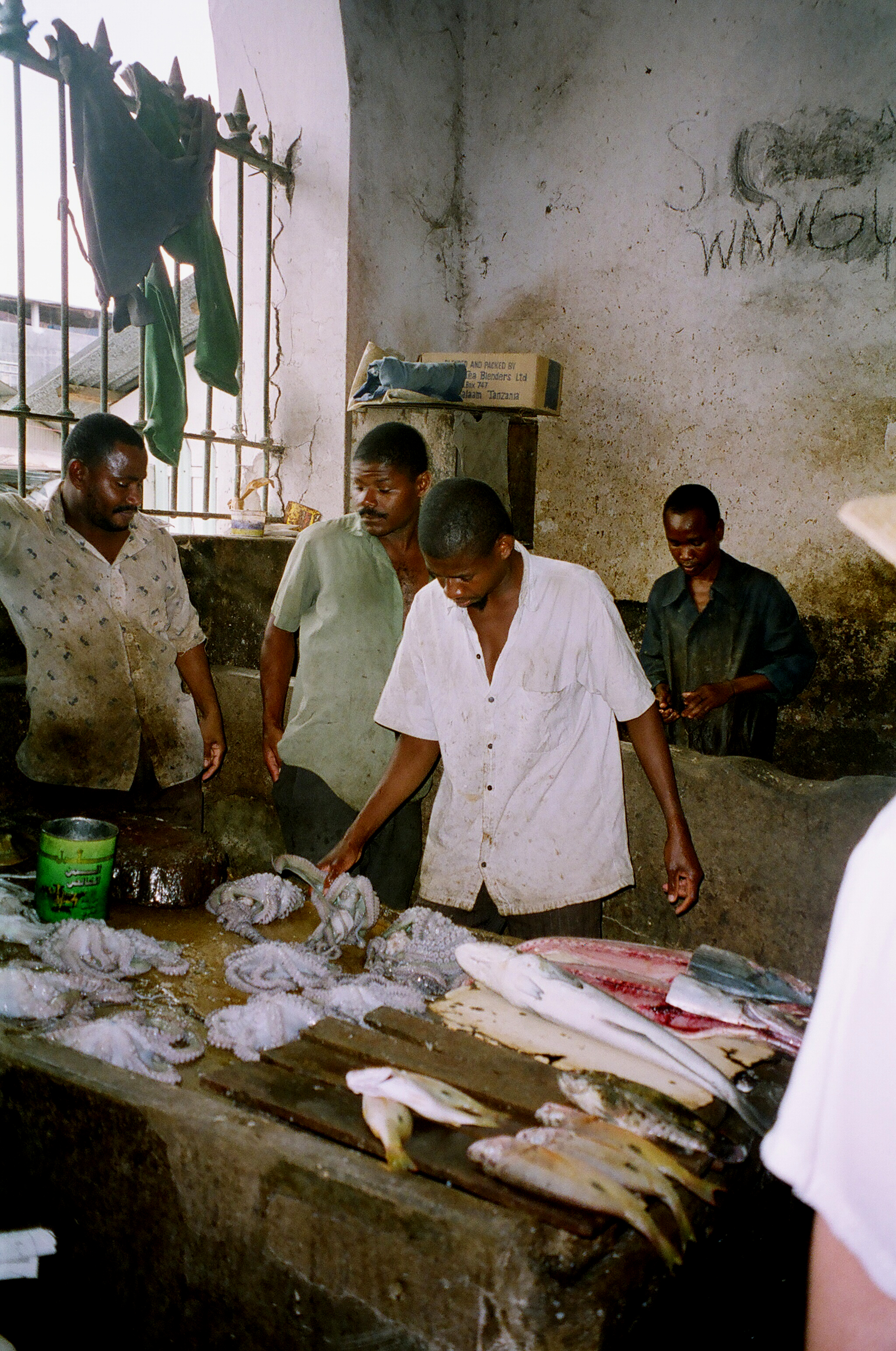
Fish vendor in Darajani

The Darajani Market (or Bazaar) is the main bazaar in Stone Town, Zanzibar. It is also known as Estella Market (after Countess Estella, sister of Lloyd Mathews, Prime Minister of Zanzibar) and informally as Marikiti Kuu (in swahili, "main market"). The market is located in Darajani Road, in the surroundings of the Anglican Cathedral of Christ.

The main structure of the market was built in 1904 by Bomanjee Maneckjee, for Sultan Ali bin Hamud. It was later extended and restored.

Darajani Bazaar is mainly a food market (seafood, meat, fruits, grains, spices), but there are also shops selling a number of different goods, from consumer electronics to clothing.

== See also ==
- Bazaar
- Bazaari
- Market (place)
- Retail
- Souq
