= Hamamni Persian Baths =

Coordinates: 6.1623°S 39.1910°E

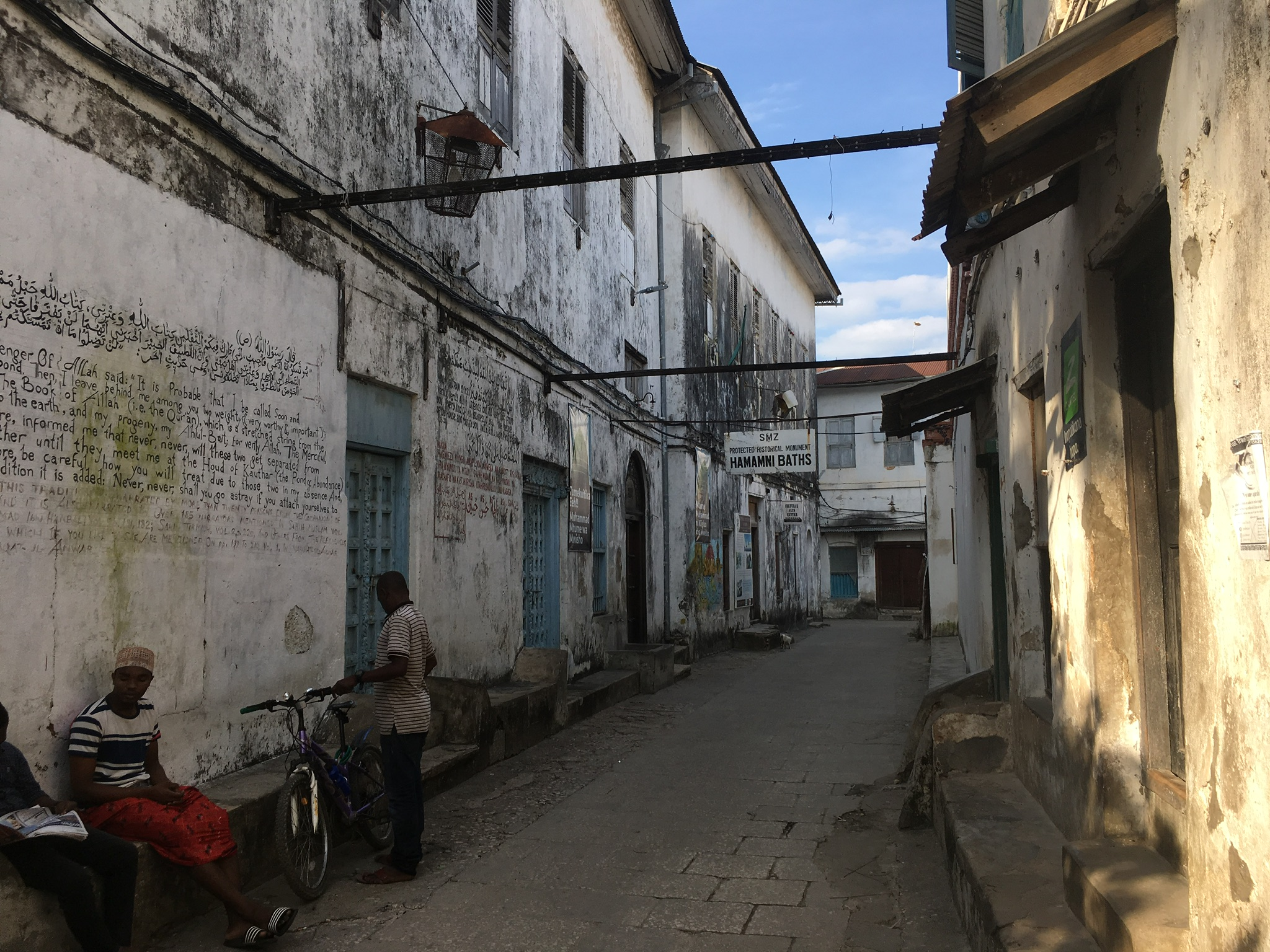
Street view of location of Hamamni Persian Baths, June 2019

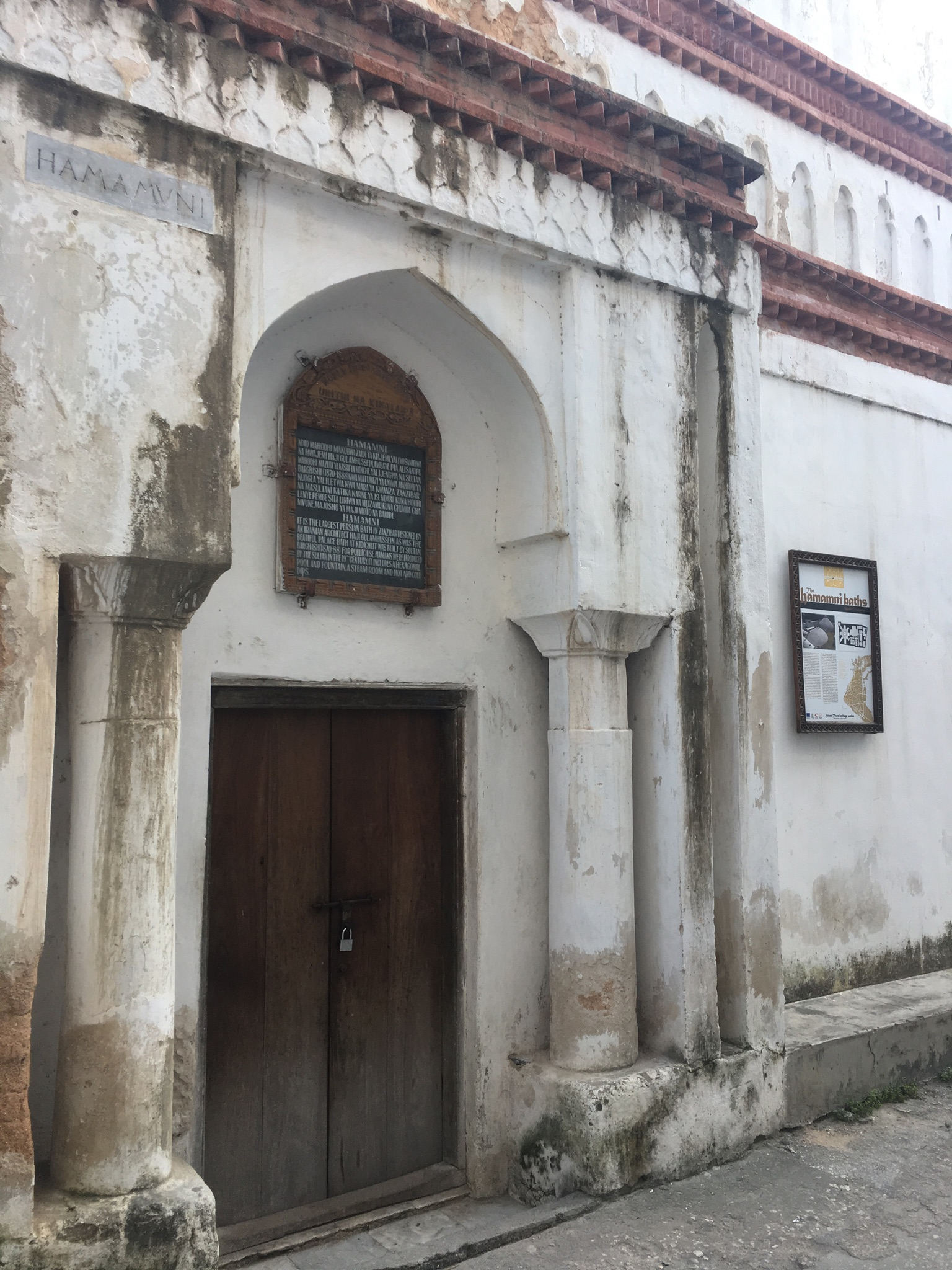
Entrance

The Hamamni Persian Baths is located in a historical building of Stone Town, Zanzibar. The name Hamamni is also used to refer to the neighbourhood where the building is located.

The Baths were built between 1870 and 1888 for sultan Barghash bin Said for use as public baths, and maintained this function until 1920. They are referred to as "Persian" because their construction was commissioned to Shirazi architects. The word "Hamamni" means "the place of the baths".

The building had a complex structure with several rooms, including hot and cold baths, toilets, shaving areas, and a restaurant. Hot water was provided by underground aqueducts. Entrance was subject to a fee, so that only wealthy zanzibaris could use them regularly. They were open both to men and women, but with different hours of admittance.

The Baths are not working anymore, but they are open to visitors and are a major tourist attractions of Stone Town. They were restored in 2006 by volunteers from the CHAM association.

Visits are limited to some areas of the original complex because part of it (e.g., the restaurant) has since been adapted for private residences.
