= Michenzani =

Neighbourhood of Zanzibar City

Coordinates: 6.16526°S 39.19880°E

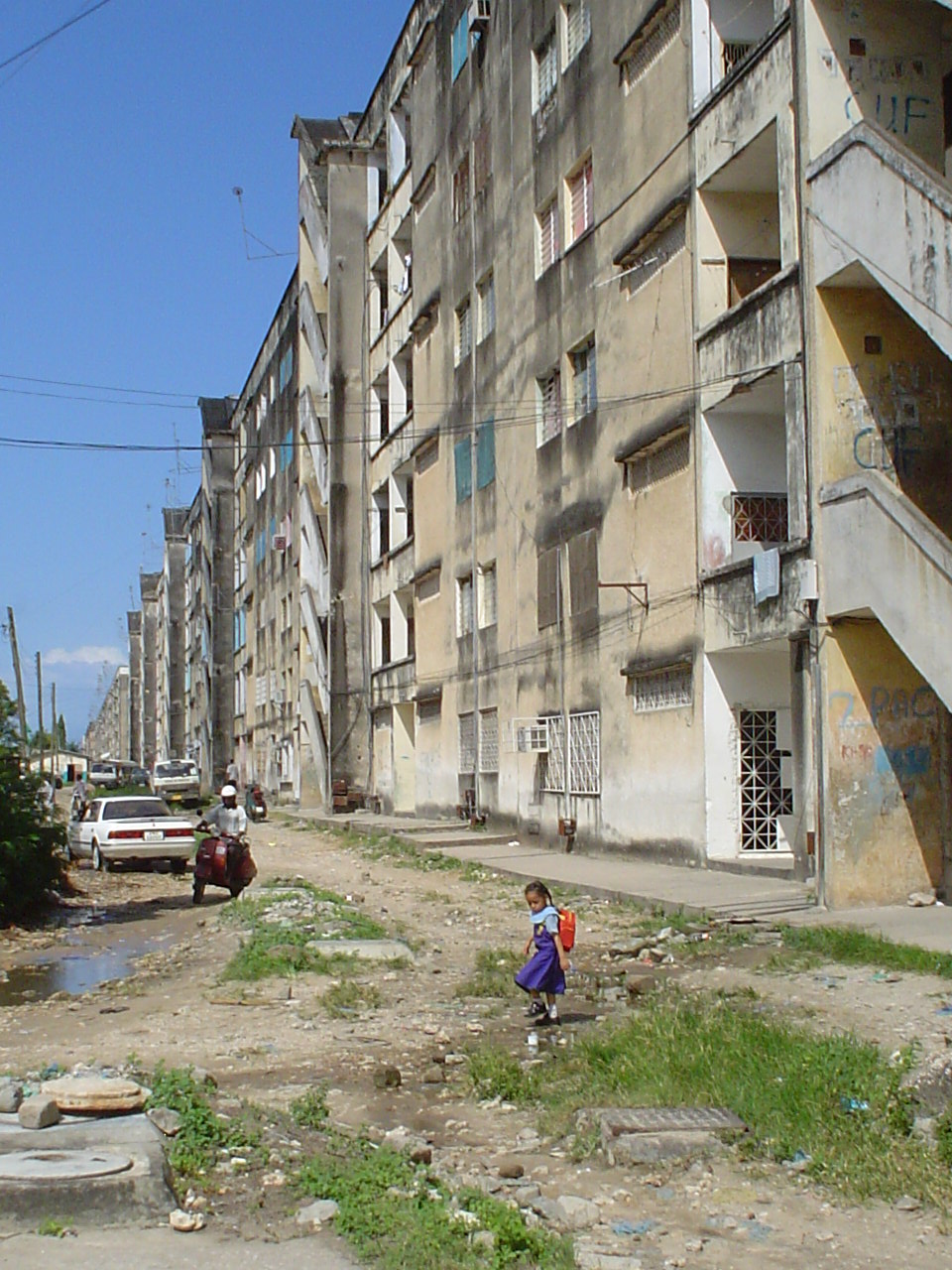
Apartment blocks in Michenzani

Michenzani is a large neighbourhood of Ng'ambo, the more modern part of Zanzibar City in Tanzania. It is located just across Creek Road, that separates the historical part of the city, Stone Town (to the west) and Ng'ambo (to the east). The place is mostly known for the Plattenbauten, i.e., the large apartment blocks that were built here in the late 1960s and early 1970s with the aid of East Germany.

== History ==
The Michenzani neighbourhood gained its fame during the 1970s, when an urban renewal plan was started in Ng'ambo by Zanzibari revolutionary government, with the aid of East Germany. A complex of "Plattenbauten" (apartment blocks constructed from large, prefabricated concrete slabs) was built in Michenzani as well as other areas of suburban and rural Zanzibar.

The buildings are different sizes, with the tallest having seven floors and the shortest four floors. As a consequence of the construction process, some buildings comprise different parts with a different number of floors each: for example, block #7 is partly five floors and partly seven floors high. Despite being the tallest public buildings in Zanzibar, no lifts were installed and all the flats are only accessible by stairs.

The Michenzani apartment blocks used to be the pride of revolutionary Zanzibar; despite this, virtually no maintenance has been made after the 1970s, so the buildings are now in a state of decay. Lack of water pressure makes water services unavailable from the second floors up. As a result, many residents have installed their own water pumps, which are not in keeping with the original style of the buildings.

Some of the apartments were renovated in 2010, giving them a fresh coat of paint.
