= History of rail transport in Zanzibar =

Railway services in Zanzibar

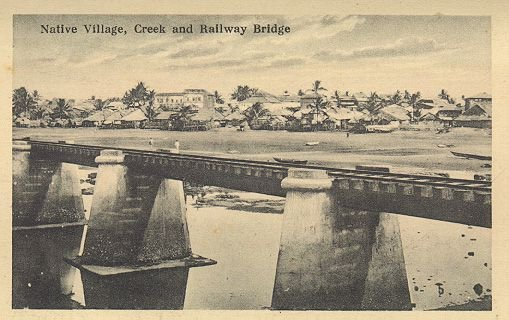
Zanzibar village, creek and railway bridge, ca. 1905

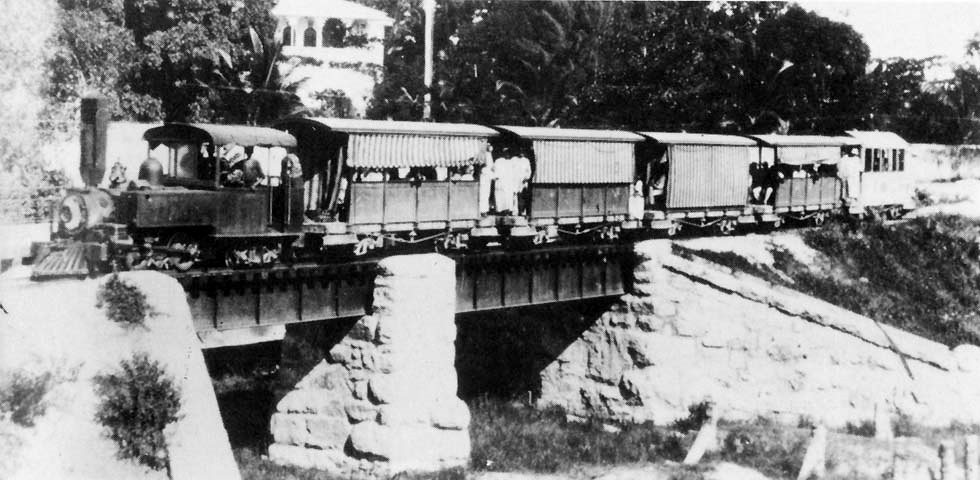
Bububu Railway

Zanzibar was the first country in East Africa to introduce the steam locomotive.

== Sultan's railway ==
Sultan Bargash bin Said had a seven-mile railway constructed from his palace at Stone Town to Chukwani in 1879. Initially the two Pullman cars were hauled by mules but in 1881 the Sultan ordered an 0-4-2T locomotive from the English locomotive builders Bagnall. The railway saw service until the Sultan died in 1888 when the track and locomotive were scrapped.

== Zanzibar Railroad Company (Bububu Railway) ==
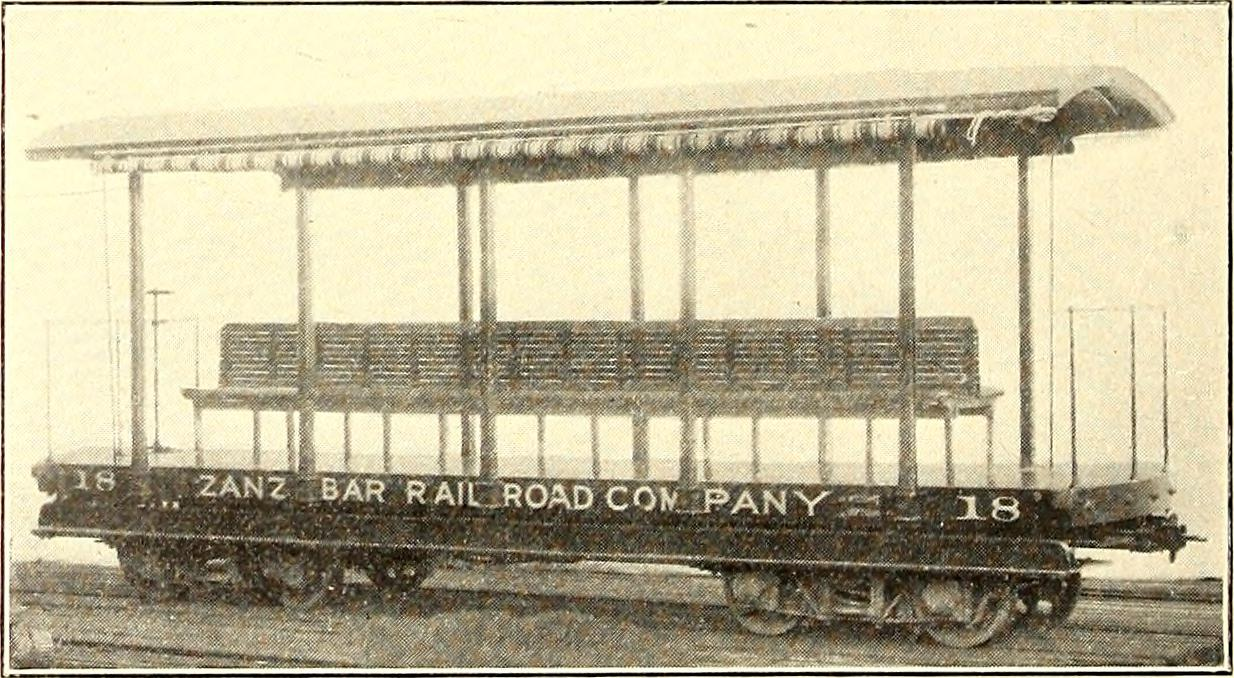
Car 18, The Street railway journal (1905)

In 1905 the American company Arnold Cheyney built a seven-mile line from Zanzibar Town to the village of Bububu. It was notorious for its ability to set fire to property and the surrounding countryside, but it ran for 25 years until it closed in 1930. Within the town, the railway operated on some of the narrowest streets.

Around the 1920s, the Bububu Railway plied the route to Zanzibar Town 6 or 7 times daily. The train was popular among the locals, but a special first class coach was available for the benefit of sightseeing tourists.

During the railway construction the Americans undertook the task of installing electrical power lines along the track. Wherever the rails were placed, metal poles were installed and power lines strung overhead. By 1906, Stone Town had electric street lights. In 1911, the railway was sold to the government, and by 1922 the passenger service ceased. As roads improved and motor vehicles on the island increased, its popularity diminished.

With the improvement of the port the railway was used for the haulage of stone which was used to reclaim the seafront. Today much of the old track bed has been built on however some of the railway’s bridges and embankments remain close to the main road to Bububu.

== See also ==
- History of Zanzibar
- Rail transport in Tanzania
- History of rail transport in Tanzania
