= Ng'ambo =

Major part of Zanzibar City, Tanzania

Coordinates: 6.16367°S 39.19841°E

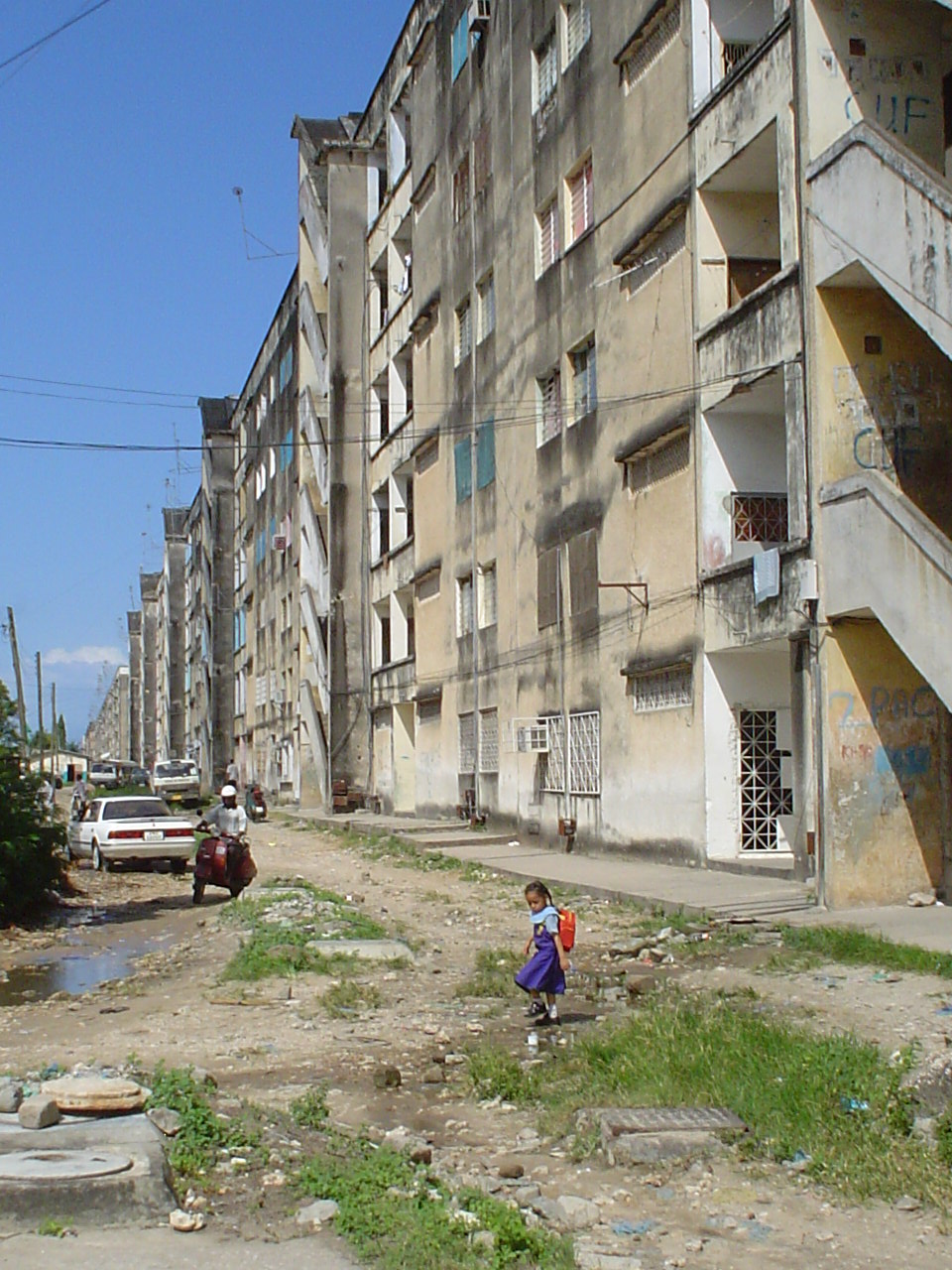
Apartment blocks in Michenzani

Ng'ambo (literally, "The Other Side"; sometimes also referred to as the "New City") is one of the two main parts comprising Zanzibar City, the capital of Zanzibar, the other being the historical Stone Town. Ng'ambo is much larger and more modern than Stone Town, with office buildings and large apartment blocks, as well as slum areas. Ng'ambo and Stone Town are divided by Creek Road.

== History ==
Until the mid 19th Century, Ng'ambo was a small community of African slaves. It then began to grow, and by 1895 it comprised 15 wards and was home to 15,000 people. By 1922 its population was twice that of nearby Stone Town, and by the time of independence from Britain in 1964 it housed 80,000 people.

After the Zanzibar Revolution, Ng'ambo was the site of the "New Zanzibar Project", a 1968 urban redevelopment scheme started by the revolutionary government. This scheme was funded, in part, by the German Democratic Republic. It was to be the start of a project to provide the entire population of Zanzibar with western-style apartments, located in ten new towns. The 1968 plan called for 9,992 apartments to be built in the Soviet-style on land created by the demolition of existing homes. A prominent example of apartment blocks built with the GDR aid in Ng'ambo is found in the Michenzani neighbourhood. The new apartments were often reserved for ASP party members or doled out as favours and so many of those whose homes had been demolished were left without a place to live. The small apartments were unpopular with Zanzibaris used to large families and construction stopped after just 1,102 apartments were built; the project was viewed as a political failure, although they have seen a resurgence in use as starter homes.

== Bibliography ==
- Ng'ambo Atlas. Historic urban landscape of Zanzibar town's "other side". Ed. by Antoni Folkers & Iga Perzyna. Department of Rural and Urban Planning, Zanzibar & African Architecture Matters. LM Publishers, 2019. ISBN 9789460225178 Digital edition
- Myers, Garth A. (1994), "Making the Socialist City of Zanzibar", Geographical Review, 84 (4), American Geographical Society: 451–464, doi:10.2307/215759, JSTOR 215759.
- Shillington, Kevin (2005), Encyclopedia of African History, CRC Press, ISBN 1-57958-245-1.
