= St. Joseph's Cathedral, Zanzibar =

Historic building in Stone Town, Zanzibar

St. Joseph's Cathedral
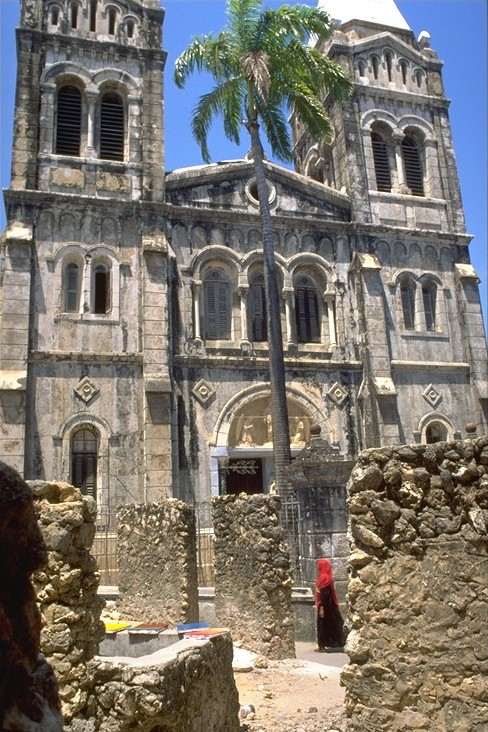
- St. Joseph's Cathedral in Stone Town, with the old palm tree

- Location within Tanzania

Religion
- Affiliation: Roman Catholic

Location
- Location: Zanzibar, Tanzania
- Municipality: Stone Town
- Interactive map of St. Joseph's Cathedral
- Coordinates: 6°09′46″S 39°11′20″E

Architecture
- Completed: 1893
- Spire: 2

The Roman Catholic cathedral of St. Joseph is one of the most important historical buildings in Stone Town, Zanzibar, as well as one of its main visitor attractions.

The church is regularly used by the local Catholic community, with several masses being held each Sunday and occasionally on weekdays.

== Location ==
The church is located in the Baghani area, off Kenyatta road. While its twin spires are easily seen from a distance and from elevated places in Stone Town (i.e., the House of Wonders balconies), the church itself can prove hard to find in the maze of narrow streets of Baghani. The easiest route to the church is following Kenyatta Road to Gizenga Street and then taking the first street on the right.

== History and style ==
The church was built by French missionaries between 1893 and 1898. The design of the church was based on that of the Marseille Cathedral, and in fact the two churches bear some resemblance to each other, the Stone Town cathedral being much smaller. Its main architectural feature is twin spires (like those of Marseille's church) that are one of the easiest elements of Stone Town's skyline to spot from elevated places as well as from the ocean. The interior is painted with scenes from the Old Testament, all of which have been destroyed due to the poorly done restoration in 2014. The tiles and stained glass windows were imported from France.

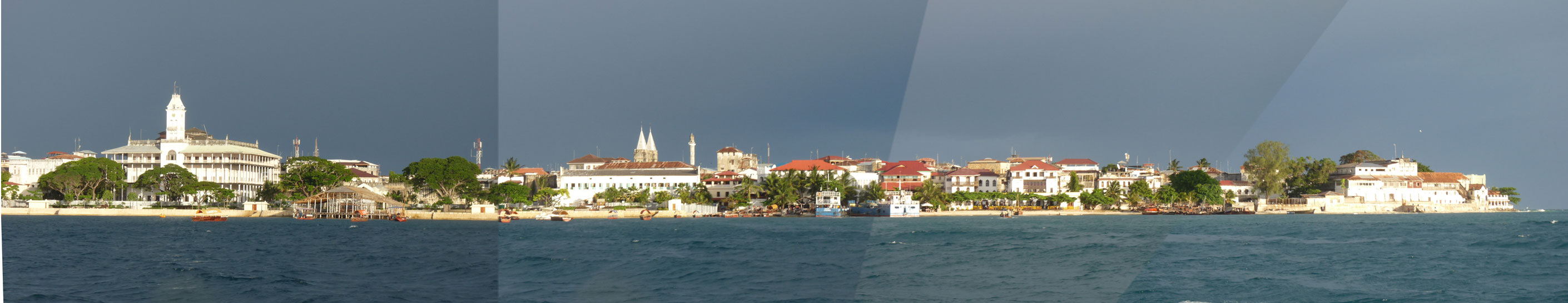
A panorama of Stone Town taken from the Zanzibar Channel. The twin spires of St. Joseph's cathedral are clearly visible in the central part of the panorama.

In the narrow churchyard there used to be a tall palm tree, which appears in most pictures of the church; the tree has been cut down sometimes in the 2000s.
