= Bububu =

Town in Zanzibar, Tanzania

Coordinates: 6°6′S 39°13′E

Bububu is a town on the Tanzanian island of Unguja, the main island of Zanzibar. It is located on the central west coast, 10 kilometres north of the Zanzibari capital of Stone Town.

The town is primarily a densely populated industrial area but is also known for its beach, one of the most popular and accessible from the capital.

One of the first railways in Zanzibar was built in 1905 to connect Bububu with Stone Town.
