= Christ Church Cathedral, Zanzibar =

Anglican cathedral in Stone Town, Zanzibar, Tanzania

Christ Church
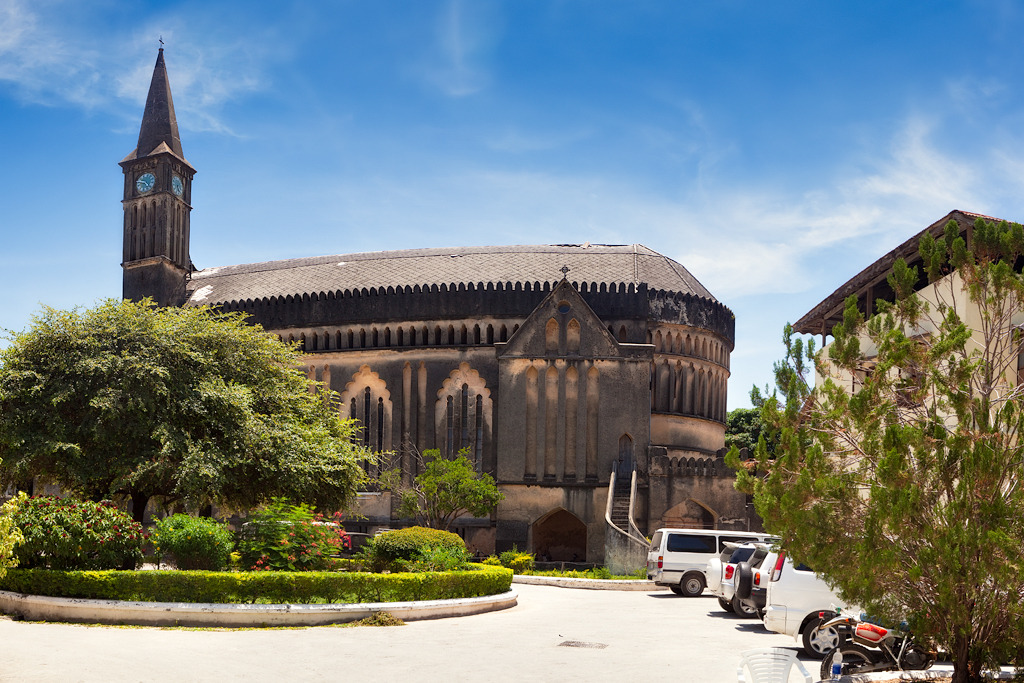
- View of the cathedral

- Location within Tanzania

Religion
- Affiliation: Anglican

Location
- Location: Zanzibar, Tanzania
- Municipality: Stone Town
- Coordinates: 6.1629°S 39.1925°E

Architecture
- Groundbreaking: 1873
- Completed: 1879

Christ Church is an Anglican cathedral in Stone Town, Zanzibar, Tanzania. It belongs to the Anglican Church of Tanzania. It is a landmark historical church, as well as one of the most prominent examples of early Christian architecture in East Africa.

It was built in seven years, the foundation stone being laid on Christmas Day 1873 until the opening on Christmas 1879, based on a vision of Edward Steere, third Anglican bishop of Zanzibar, who actively contributed to the design. As most buildings in Stone Town, it is made mostly of coral stone. It has a unique concrete roof shaped in an unusual barrel vault (that was Steere's idea) and the overall structure mixes Perpendicular Gothic and Islamic details. The cathedral was consecrated in 1903 and named after Canterbury Cathedral.

The church is located in Mkunazini Road, in the centre of the old town, and occupies a large area where the biggest slave market of Zanzibar used to be; the construction of the cathedral was in fact intended to celebrate the end of slavery. The altar is said to be in the exact place where the main "whipping post" of the market used to be. In the square there is a well-known monument to the slaves (a few human figures in chains emerging from a pit) as well as a museum on slavery.

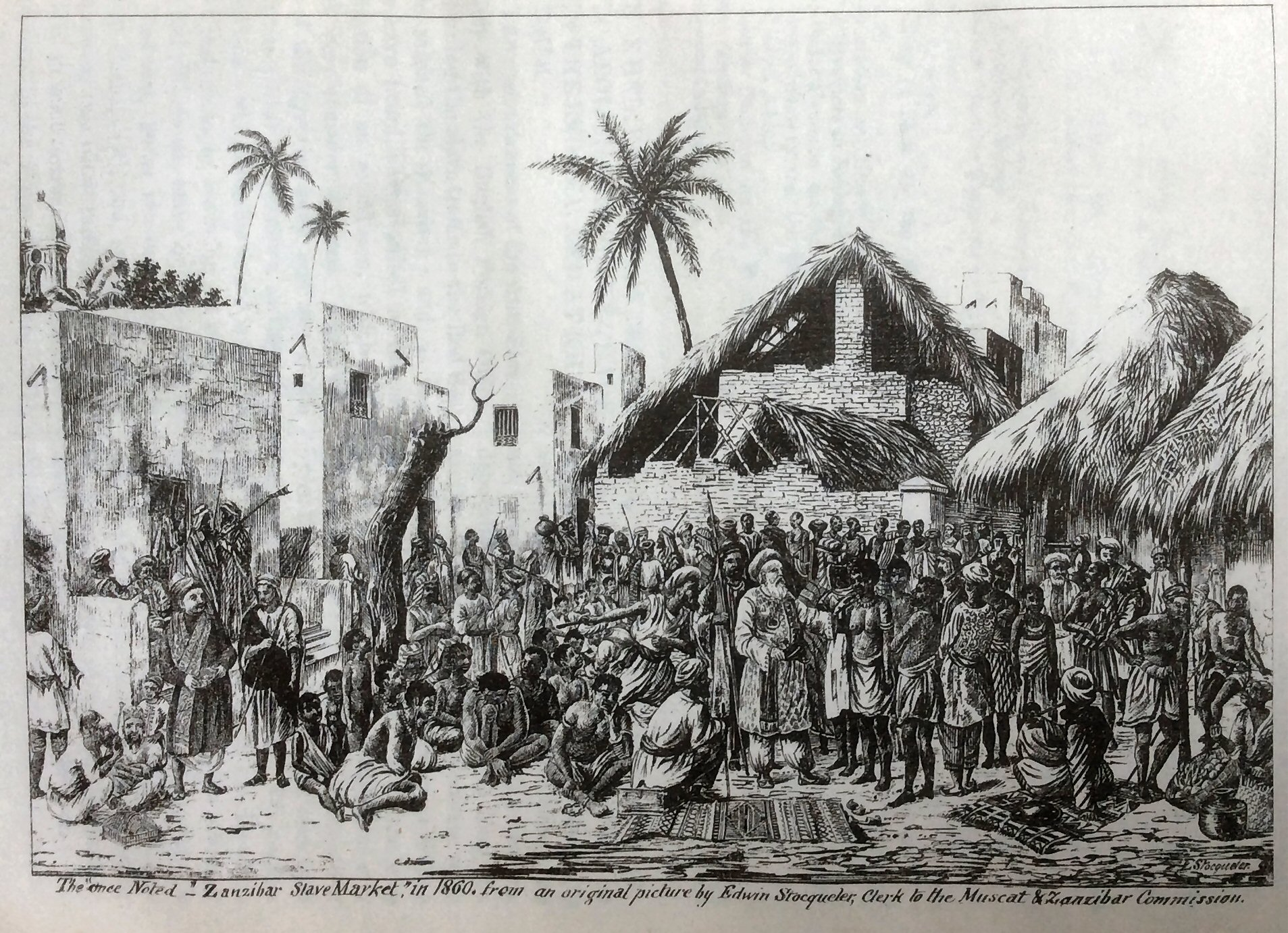
Former slave market in Stone Town.

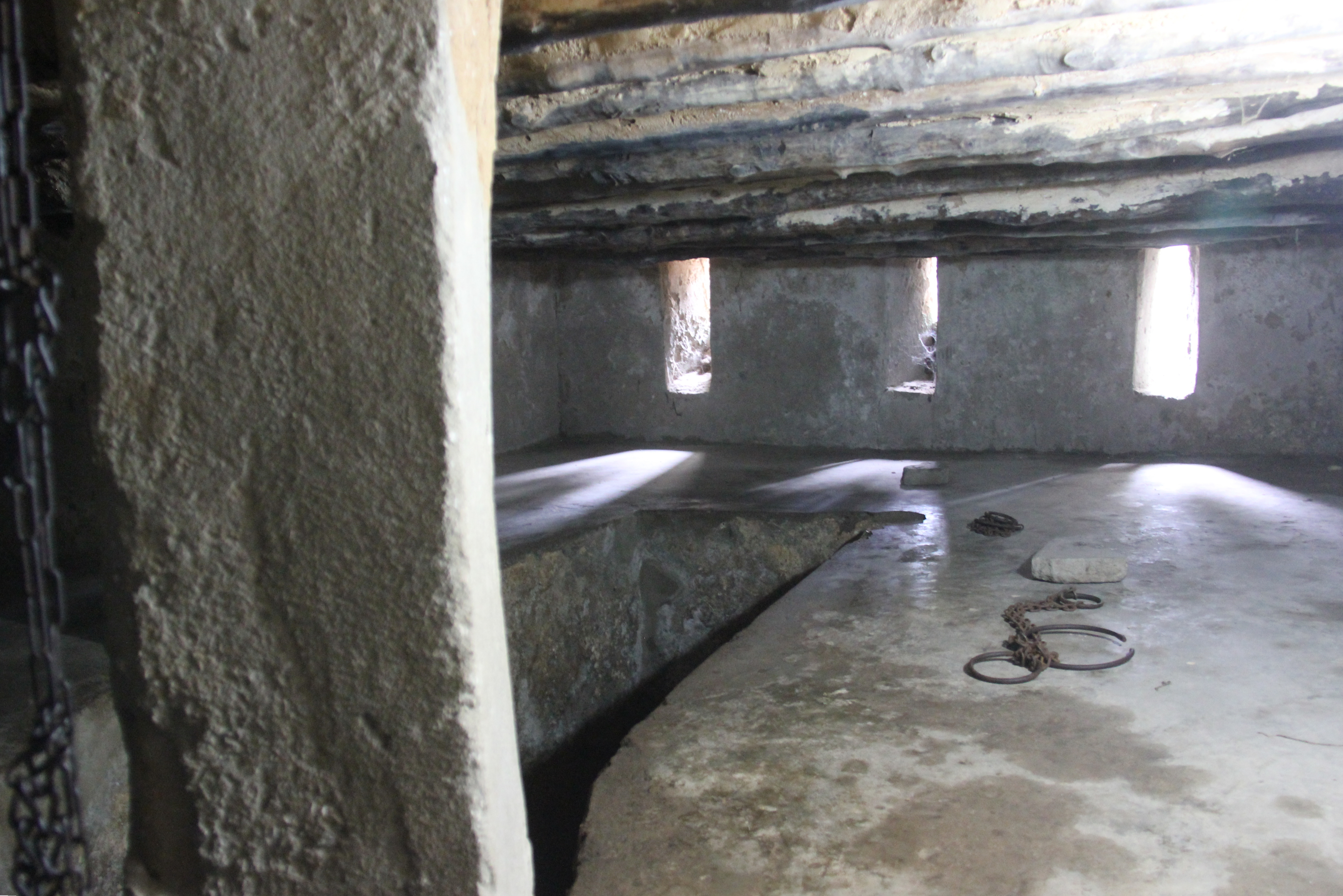
A place where slaves were kept before being sold in Zanzibar.

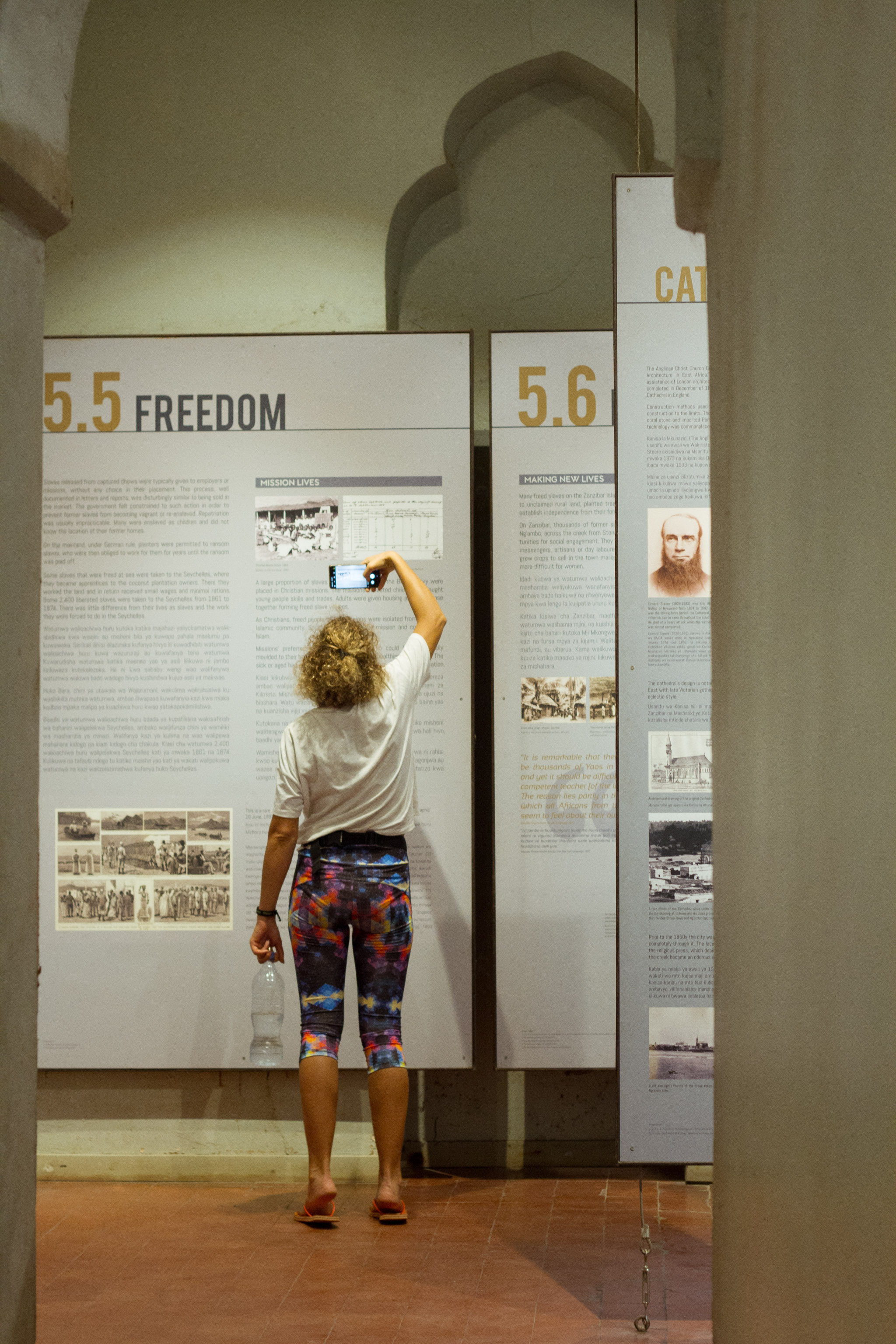
A foreign visitor learns something about freedom.

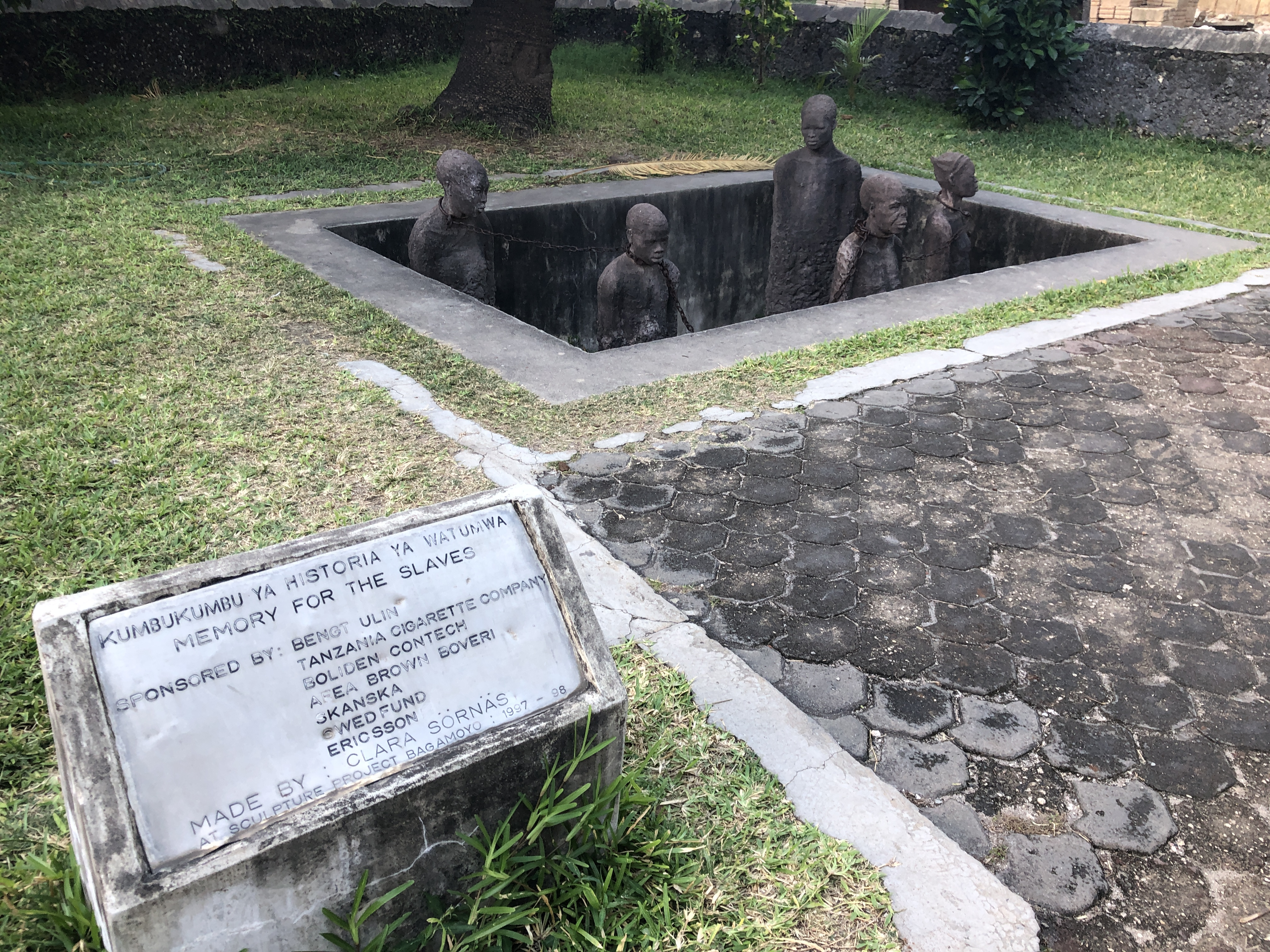
The Slave Monument.

Edward Steere died of a heart attack when the cathedral was almost completed, and was buried behind the altar. Inside the church there is a cross that was made from the wood of the tree that grows on the place where David Livingstone's heart was buried, in Chitambo.

As many other historical coral-stone buildings in Stone Town, the Cathedral experiences decay and structural problems and needs restoring.

The cathedral is linked with Ely Cathedral, in the diocese of Ely, Cambridgeshire, UK.
