= Stone Town =

Old town of Zanzibar City, Tanzania

UNESCO World Heritage Site
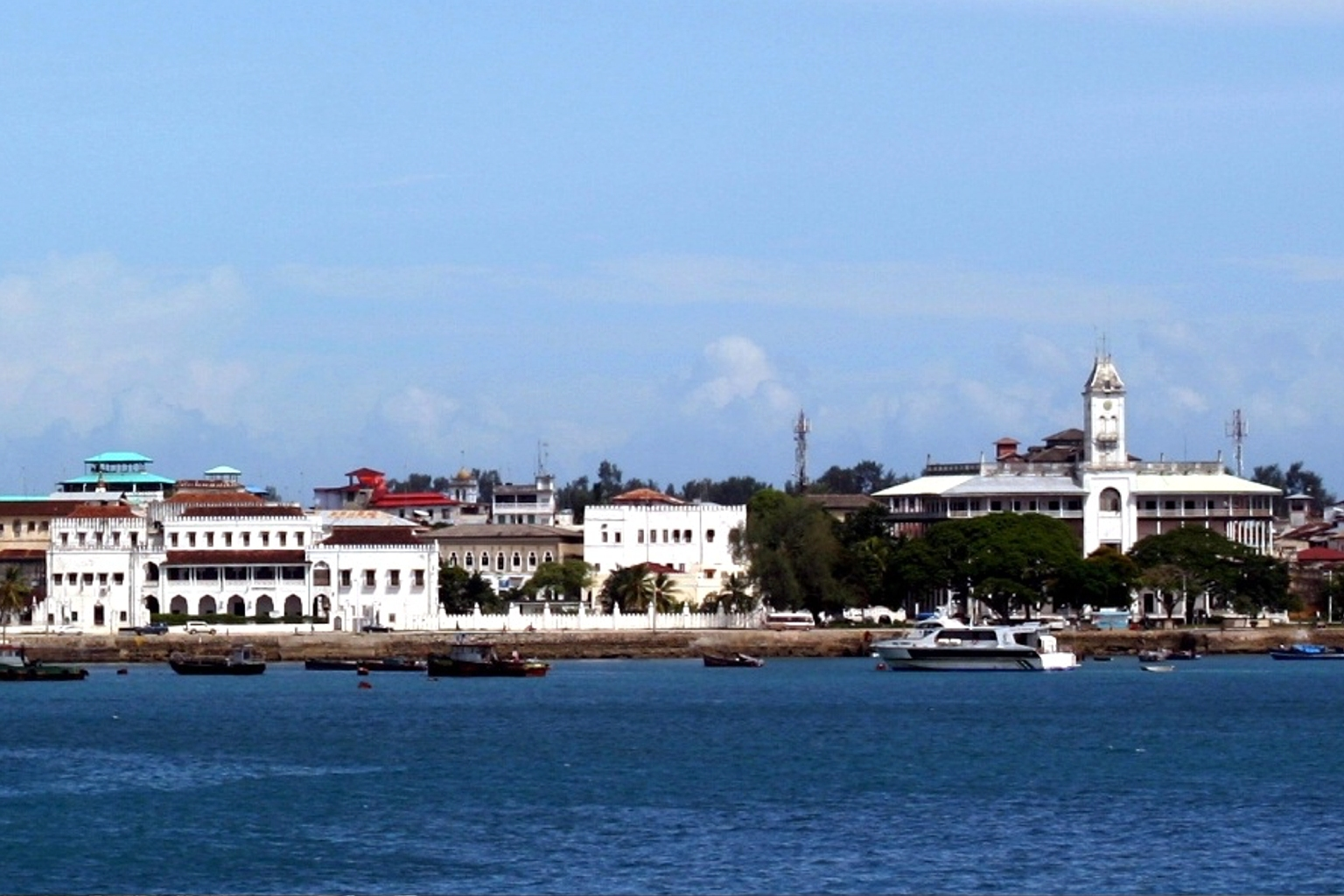

- Location within Tanzania
- Location: Zanzibar City, Tanzania
- Criteria: Cultural: ii, iii, vi
- Reference: 173
- Inscription: 2000 (24th Session)
- Area: 96 ha (240 acres)
- Buffer zone: 84.79 ha (209.5 acres)
- Coordinates: 6°09′45″S 39°11′29″E

The Stone Town of Zanzibar (Arabic: مدينة زنجبار الحجرية, romanized: madīnat Zanjibār al-ḥajariyya), also known as Mji Mkongwe (Swahili for 'old town'), is the old part of Zanzibar City, the main city of Zanzibar, in Tanzania. The newer portion of the city is known as Ng'ambo, Swahili for 'the other side'. Stone Town is located on the western coast of Unguja, the main island of the Zanzibar Archipelago. Former capital of the Sultanate of Zanzibar, and flourishing centre of the spice trade as well as the Indian Ocean slave trade in the 19th century, it retained its importance as the main city of Zanzibar during the period of the British protectorate. When Tanganyika and Zanzibar joined each other to form the United Republic of Tanzania, Zanzibar kept a semi-autonomous status, with Stone Town as its local government seat.

Stone Town is a city of prominent historical and artistic importance in East Africa. Its architecture, mostly dating back to the 19th century, reflects the diverse influences underlying the Swahili culture, giving a unique mixture of Arab, Persian, Indian and European elements. For this reason, the town was designated as a UNESCO World Heritage Site in 2000.

Due to its heritage, Stone Town is also a major tourist attraction in Tanzania, and a large part of its economy depends on tourism-related activities.

== Overview ==
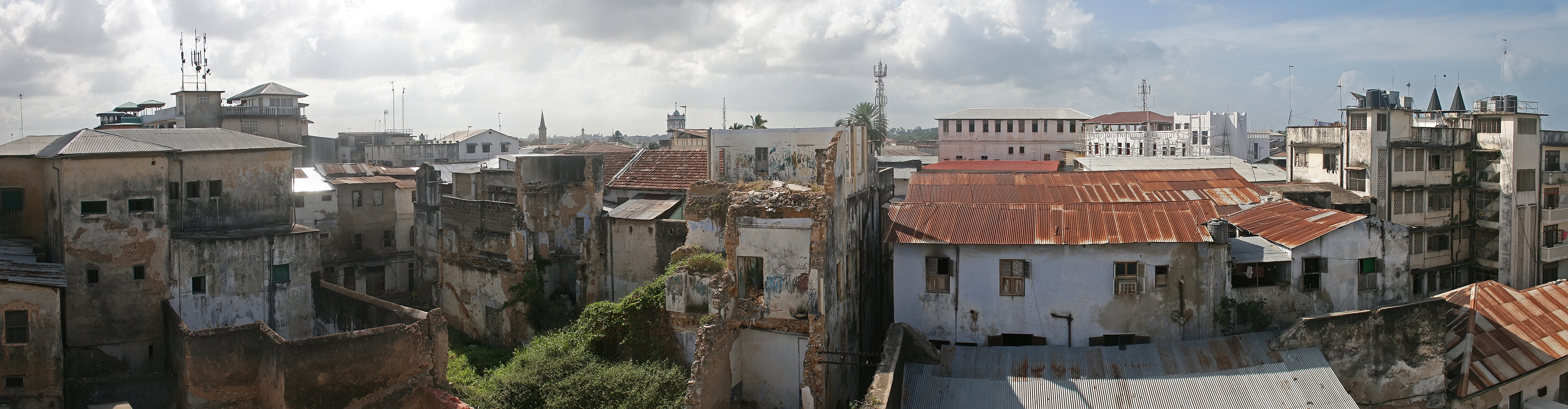
Stone Town panorama

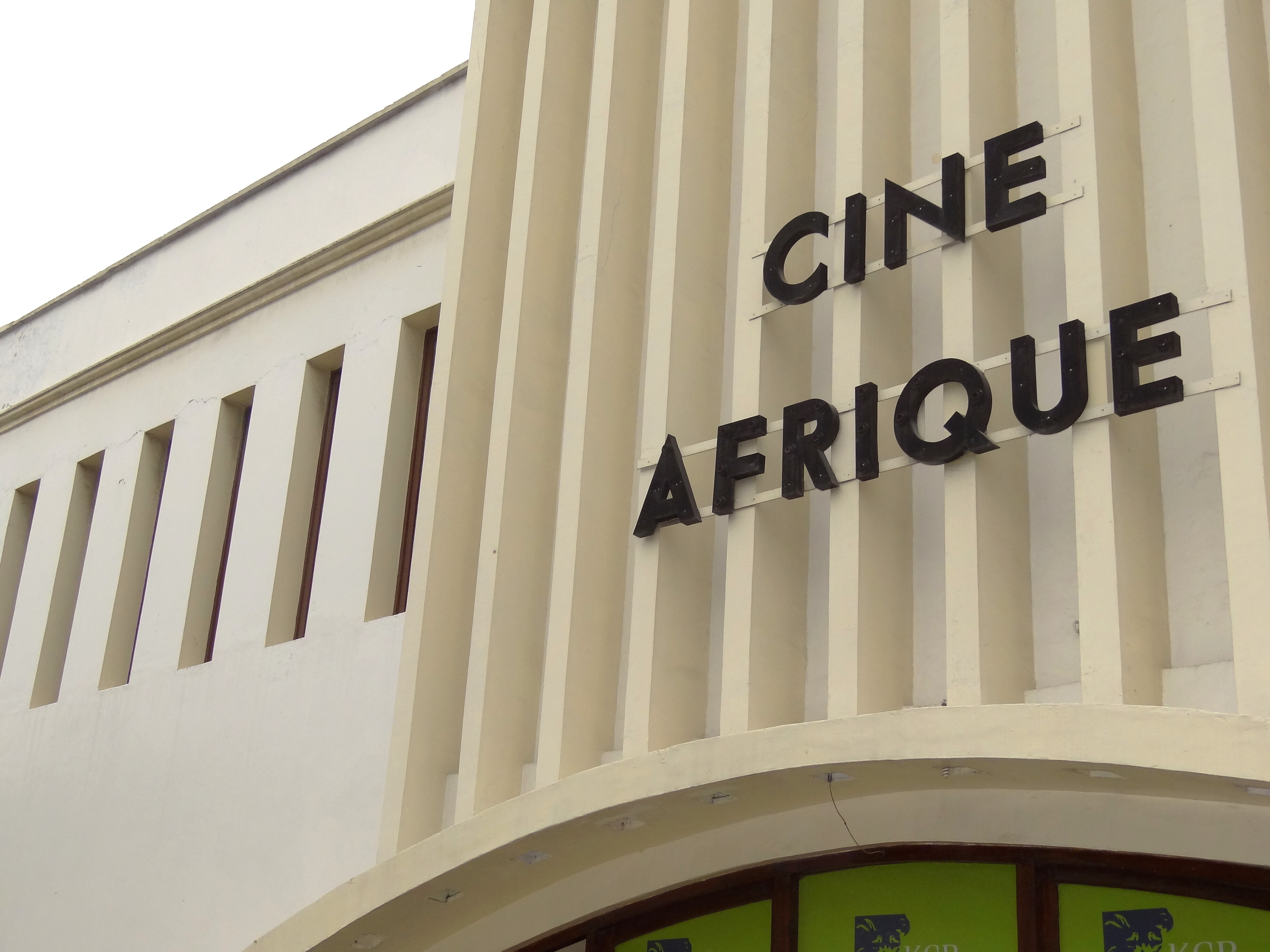
Art Deco detail of the Ciné Afrique in Stone Town

Old wall of coral rag stones and mud mortar, with renovated section of coral rag bricks (ca. 2026)

The heart of Stone Town mostly consists of a maze of narrow alleys lined by houses, shops, bazaars and mosques. Since most streets are too narrow for cars, the town is crowded with bicycles and motorbikes. The seafront has wider streets and larger, more regularly placed buildings.

Stone Town's architecture has a number of distinctive features, as a result of Arab, Persian, Indian, European, and African traditions mixing together. The name "Stone Town" comes from the ubiquitous use of coral stone as the main construction material; this stone gives the town a characteristic, reddish warm colour. Traditional buildings have a baraza, a long stone bench along the outside walls; this is used as an elevated sidewalk if heavy rains make the streets impracticable, or otherwise as benches to sit down, rest, socialize. Another key feature of most buildings is large verandas protected by carved wooden balustrades. The best-known feature of Zanzibari houses are the finely decorated wooden doors, with rich carvings and bas-reliefs, sometimes with big brass studs of Indian tradition. Two main types of doors can be distinguished: those of Indian style have rounded tops, while those in the Omani Arab style are rectangular. Carvings are often Islamic in content (for example, many consist of verses of the Qur'an), but other symbolism is occasionally used, e.g., Indian lotus flowers as emblems of prosperity.

Stone Town is punctuated with major historical buildings, several of which are found on the seafront; these include former palaces of the sultans, fortifications, churches, mosques, and other institutional buildings.

The Stone Town Conservation and Development Act of 1994 specifies actions and strategies to be taken to safeguard, conserve and develop the values of the Stone Town. Despite the establishment of a Conservation Authority, about 80% of the 1,709 buildings of Stone Town are in a deteriorating condition. As coral stone is very friable, frequent maintenance is needed for most of these buildings. Some major restoration projects (especially on the seafront) have been done in recent times by the Aga Khan Trust for Culture (AKTC).

== History ==
Zanzibar Historical affiliations

Sultanate of Kilwa before 1503
Portuguese Empire 1503–1698
Sultanate of Oman 1698–1856
Sultanate of Zanzibar 1856–1890
British Empire 1890–1963
Republic of Zanzibar 1964
Tanzania 1964–present

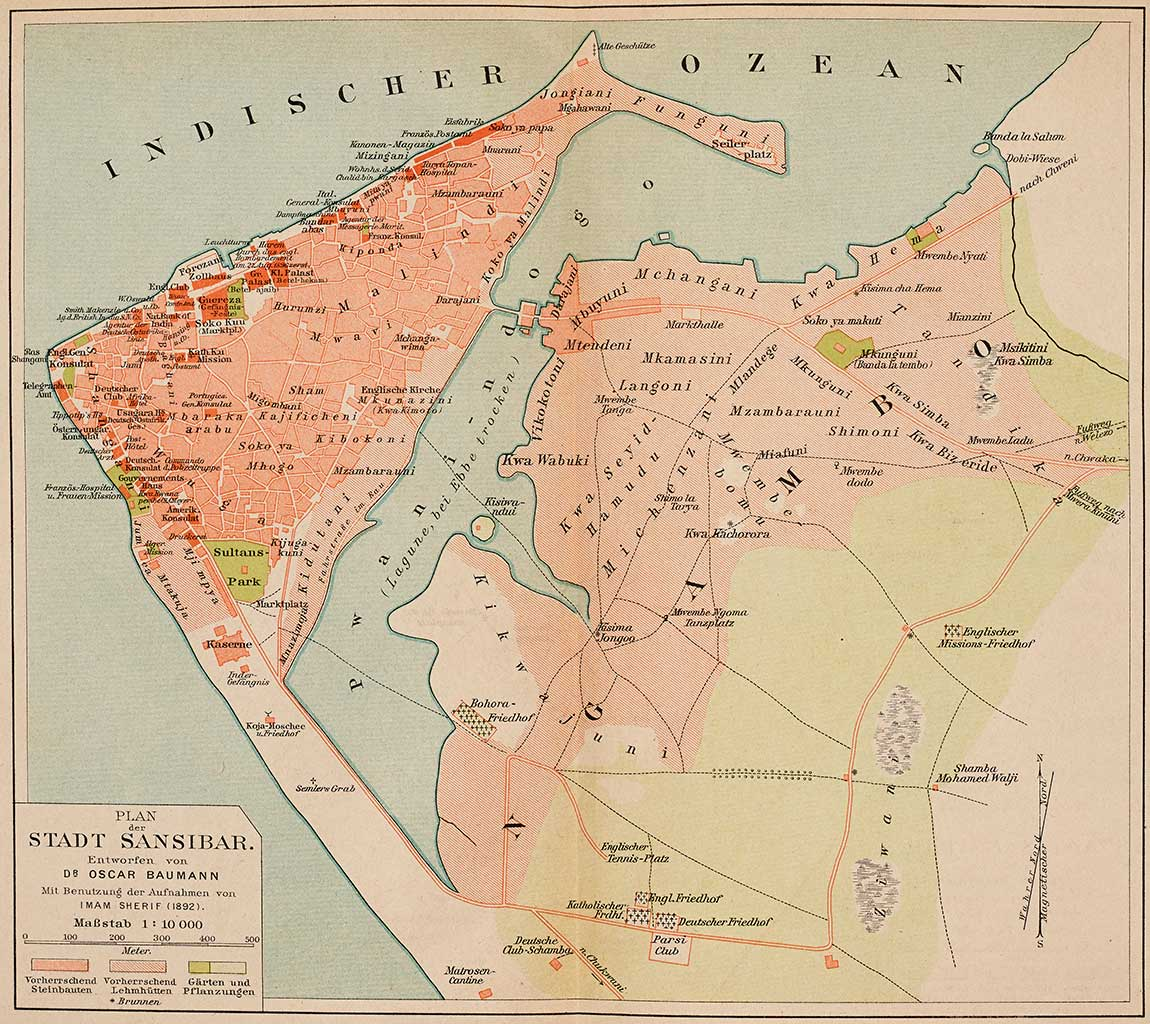
A map of Zanzibar City by Oscar Baumann, 1892. Stone Town was the western peninsula.

=== Medieval Zanzibar ===
A Greco-Roman text between the 1st and 3rd centuries, the Periplus of the Erythraean Sea, mentioned the island of Menuthias (Ancient Greek: Μενουθιάς), which is probably Unguja. Zanzibar, like the nearby coast, was settled by Bantu-speakers at the outset of the first millennium. Archaeological finds at Fukuchani, on the north-west coast of Zanzibar, indicate a settled agricultural and fishing community from the 6th century CE at the latest. The considerable amount of daub found indicates timber buildings, and shell beads, bead grinders, and iron slag have been found at the site. There is evidence for limited engagement in long-distance trade: a small amount of imported pottery has been found, less than 1% of total pottery finds, mostly from the Gulf and dated to the 5th to 8th century. The similarity to contemporary sites such as Mkokotoni and Dar es Salaam indicate a unified group of communities that developed into the first center of coastal maritime culture. The coastal towns, including those on Zanzibar, appear to have been engaged in Indian Ocean trade at this early period. Trade rapidly increased in importance and quantity beginning in the mid-8th century and by the close of the 10th century Zanzibar was one of the central Swahili trading towns.

Shangani, the original fishing town that developed into Stone Town, was a small, largely unimportant Swahili site founded in the 11th century. Bigger towns at Unguja Ukuu, Kizimkazi, and Tumbatu were the island's powers from the 8th to the 16th century. The Portuguese built a church at Shangani in the early 16th century, and the Queen of northern Unguja had a house built there in the mid-17th century. When the Portuguese were ousted by Zanzibaris and Pembans in the 17th century, local patricians invited the Sultan of Oman to wield political power in exchange for defense against Portuguese reprisals. Part of the Portuguese church was built into the Omani fort, which housed roughly fifty soldiers. The Sultan also appointed a local governor, but political authority was still largely vested in the Mwinyi Mkuu, at this time Queen Fatima.

Excavations at nearby Pemba Island, but especially at Shanga in the Lamu Archipelago, provide the clearest picture of architectural development. Houses were originally built with timber (c. 1050) and later in mud with coral walls (c. 1150). The houses were continually rebuilt with more permanent materials. By the 13th century, houses were built with stone, and bonded with mud, and the 14th century saw the use of lime to bond stone. Only the wealthier patricians would have had stone and lime built houses, the strength of the materials allowing for flat roofs, while the majority of the population lived in single-story thatched houses similar to those from the 11th and 12th centuries. According to Tom Middleton and Mark Horton, the architectural style of these stone houses have no Arab or Persian elements, and should be viewed as an entirely indigenous development of local vernacular architecture. While much of Zanzibar Town's architecture was rebuilt during Omani rule, nearby sites elucidate the general development of Swahili, and Zanzibari, architecture before the 15th century.

=== Omani dominion ===
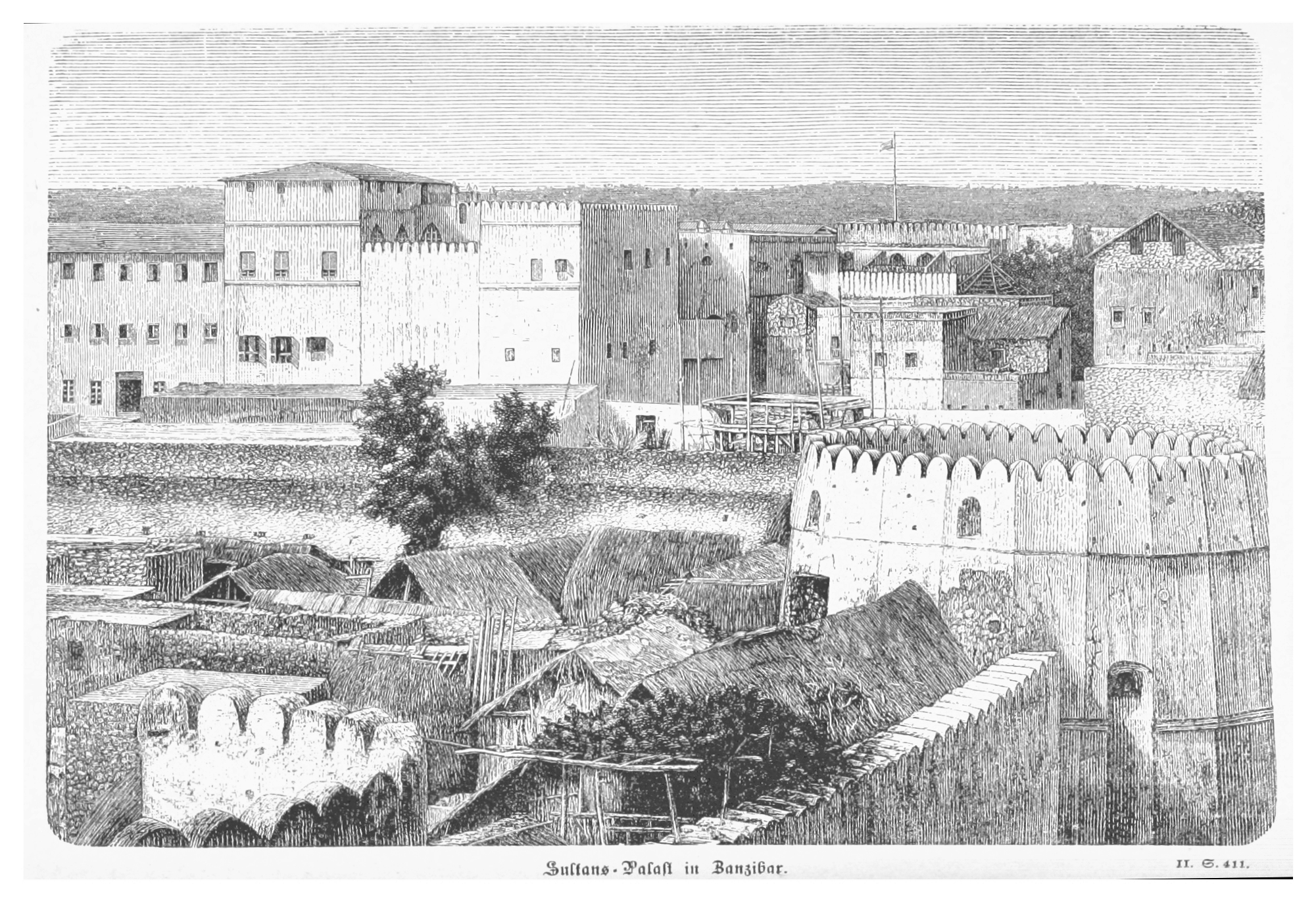
A sketch of Stone Town showing the old fort and palace from the year 1871 to the year 1875

Stone Town is located along a natural harbour and the first Europeans to set foot on the island of Zanzibar were the Portuguese. The Portuguese ruled the island for over two centuries and began constructing Stone Town's first stone structure, the Old Fort. However, towards the end of the 17th century the Sultanate of Oman took over the island and completed the fort to prevent future attacks. The first stone houses in Stone Town probably began to be built in the early 1800s, gradually replacing an earlier fishing village around the Old Fort. The Old Fort, the oldest building in Stone Town, was built in 1699 by the Omanis. At the time the Sultanate of Oman controlled the Zanzibar Archipelago, Mombasa and the Swahili coast.

In 1824, Sultan Said bin Sultan moved his seat from Muscat, Oman, to Stone Town, which thus entered an era of quick development as the new capital of the Sultanate of Oman and Zanzibar. With the British outlawing the slave trade in the Indian Ocean, the Sultanate's fortunes crashed. The Muscat economy was in shambles and many Omanis migrated to Zanzibar. The increase in the Arab population on the island facilitated further growth and more buildings began to spring up in the town. Furthermore, grand royal structures like the House of Wonders and the Sultan's Palace were also built. In 1861, as a consequence of a war of succession within the Omani royal family, Zanzibar and Oman were separated, with Zanzibar becoming an independent sultanate under Sultan Majid bin Said.

In the 19th century Stone Town flourished as a trading centre. It was especially renowned for the commerce of spices (mostly cloves) and slaves. Around middle of the century, the sultanate had a close relationship with the British; David Livingstone, for example, is known to have stayed in Stone Town in 1866 while he was preparing his final expedition into the interior of East Africa. In the same period, several immigrant communities from Oman, Persia and India formed as a consequence of the town's intense commercial activity. The Sultan of Zanzibar encouraged immigration of foreign traders who became very wealthy and settled in the city who brought diversity to the city's architecture.

=== Colonial control ===
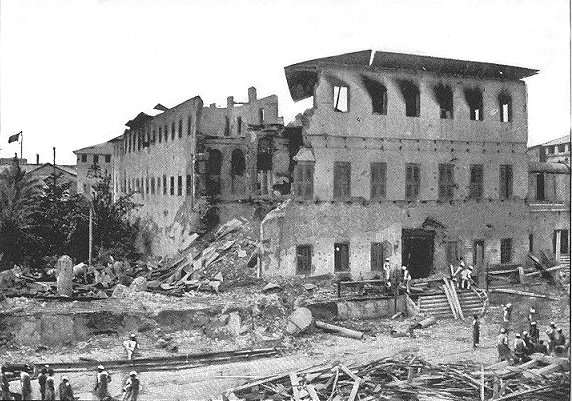
Effects of the British naval bombardment of the 1896 Anglo-Zanzibar War

In the last decades of the century, the Sultans of Zanzibar gradually lost their possessions in mainland East Africa to the German Empire and the United Kingdom. In 1890, with the Heligoland-Zanzibar Treaty, Zanzibar itself became a British protectorate. In 1896, a sudden rebellion of the Zanzibari Omanis against the British rule led to the Anglo-Zanzibar War, which is remembered as the shortest war in history: the Sultan surrendered after 45 minutes of naval bombardment of Stone Town by the Royal Navy.

During the period of British protection, the Sultan still retained some power and Stone Town remained a relatively important trading centre for the informal trade. Though the town previously had a small railway, the British constructed a railway from the Town to Bububu village. The British did not fund major developments in the town and allowed the sultan to manage the islands affairs from Stone Town. The British gave privileges to Mombasa and Dar es Salaam as their trading stations in East Africa.

=== Zanzibar Revolution ===
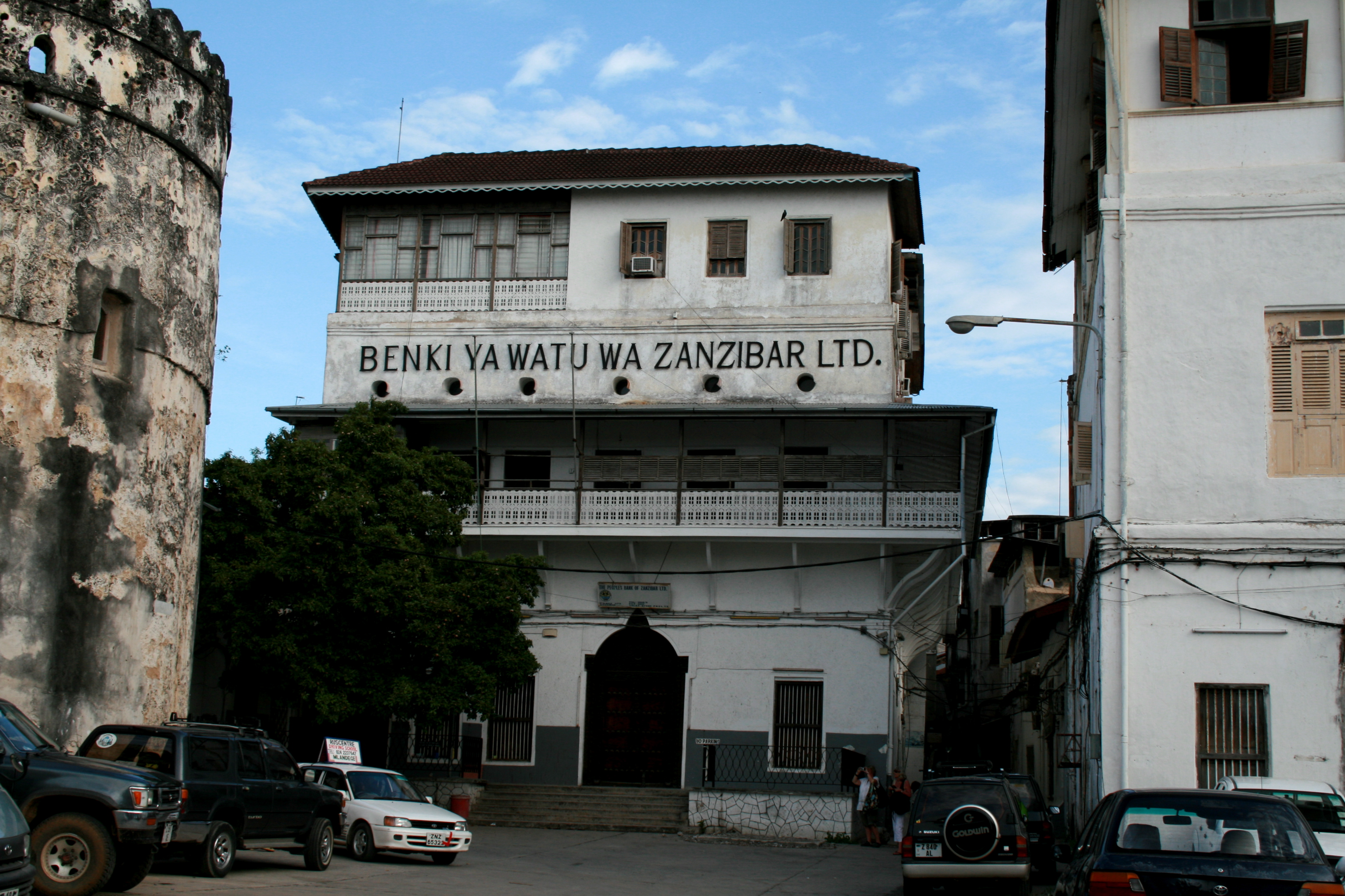
Former house converted to People's Bank of Zanzibar after revolution

In 1964, Stone Town was the theatre of the Zanzibar Revolution, which brought about the removal of the sultan and the birth of a socialist government led by the Afro-Shirazi Party (ASP). More than 20,000 people were killed and refugees, especially Arabs and Indians, escaped the island as a consequence of the revolution. The Arabs and Indians left behind everything they had and the ASP quickly occupied old homes and converted them into public buildings. In 1964, when Tanganyika and Zanzibar combined to form Tanzania, Stone Town kept its role as a capital and government seat for Zanzibar, which was declared a semi-autonomous part of the new nation.

== Geography ==
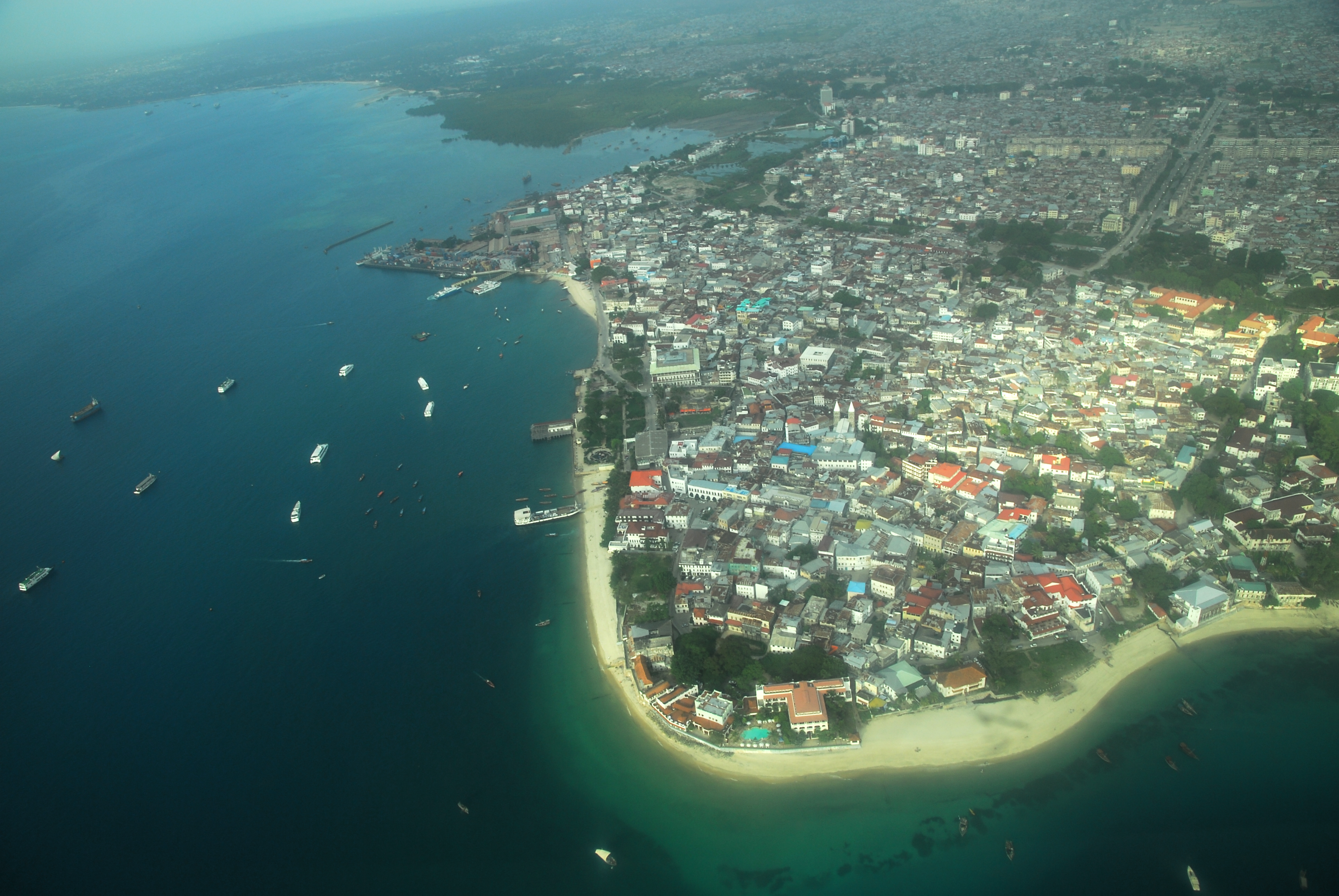
Aerial view of Stone Town and Stone Town Harbour

Stone Town is located roughly in the middle of the west coast of Unguja, on a small promontory protruding into the Zanzibar Channel. The closest major settlement on the Tanzanian coast, opposite Stone Town, is Bagamoyo (to the south-west). Stone Town is part of Zanzibar City, which also includes the 'New City' of Ng'ambo ("the Other Side"), which mostly extends in the interior of Unguja to the south-east. The dividing line between Stone Town and Ng'ambo is Creek Road, later renamed to Benjamin Mkapa Road, marking the west side of the now reclaimed creek that separated them.

== Demographics ==
Historical population
Year	Pop.	±%
1870 Est.	10,000	—
1948	16,698	+67.0%
1958	18,179	+8.9%
1978	15,493	−14.8%
1988	15,854	+2.3%
2008	15,000	−5.4%
2016 Est.	16,000	+6.7%

== Landmarks ==
=== Historical buildings and sites ===
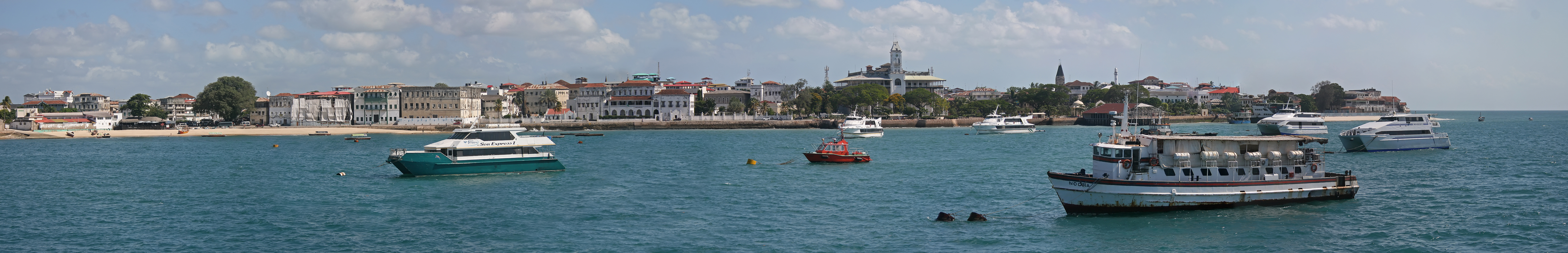
A panorama of Zanzibar, particularly the Stone Town, panorama taken from the Indian Ocean. Seen in the picture are the Sultan's palace, House of Wonders, Forodhani Gardens, and the St. Joseph's Cathedral.

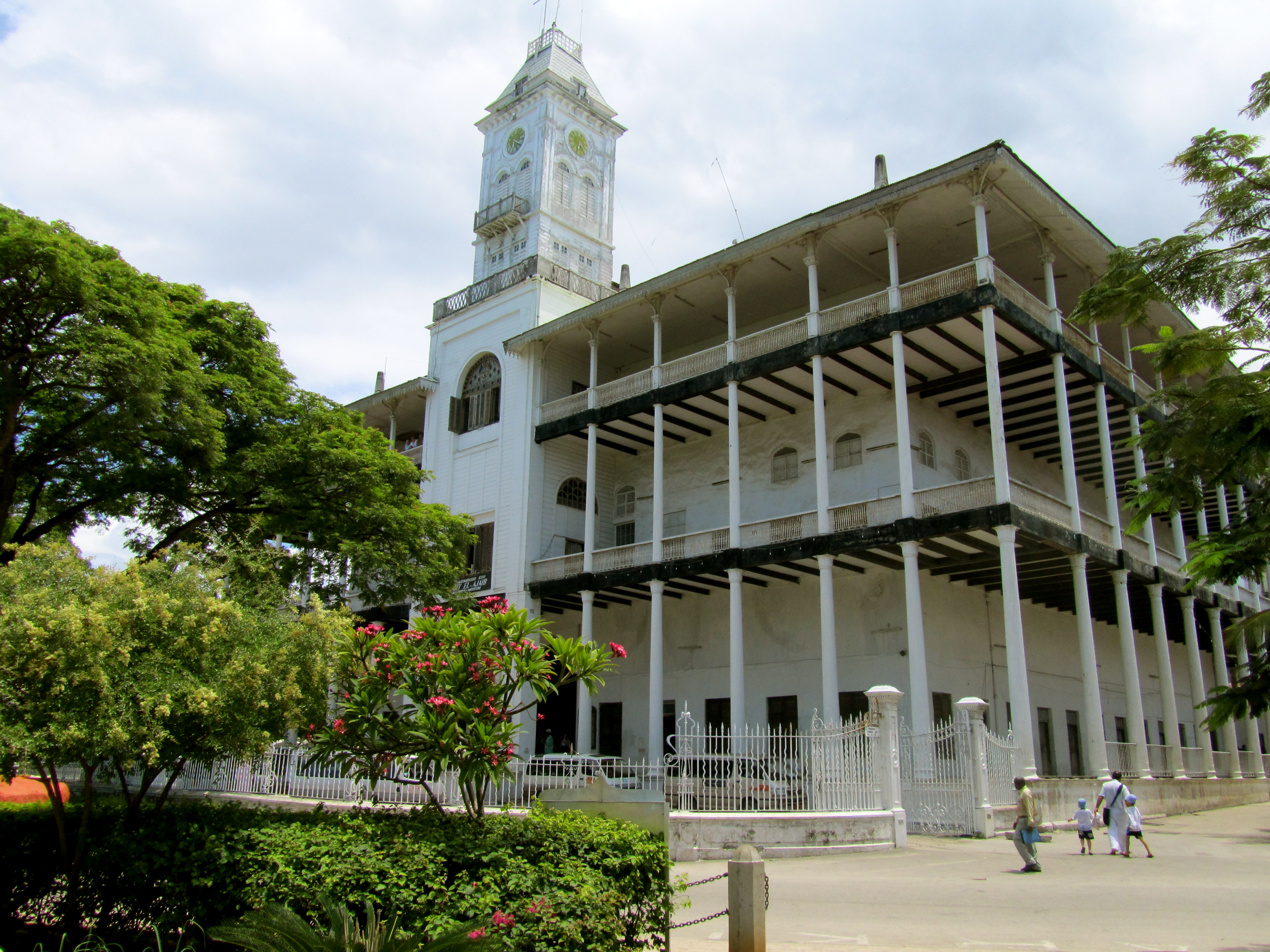
The House of Wonders, now hosting a museum on Swahili culture

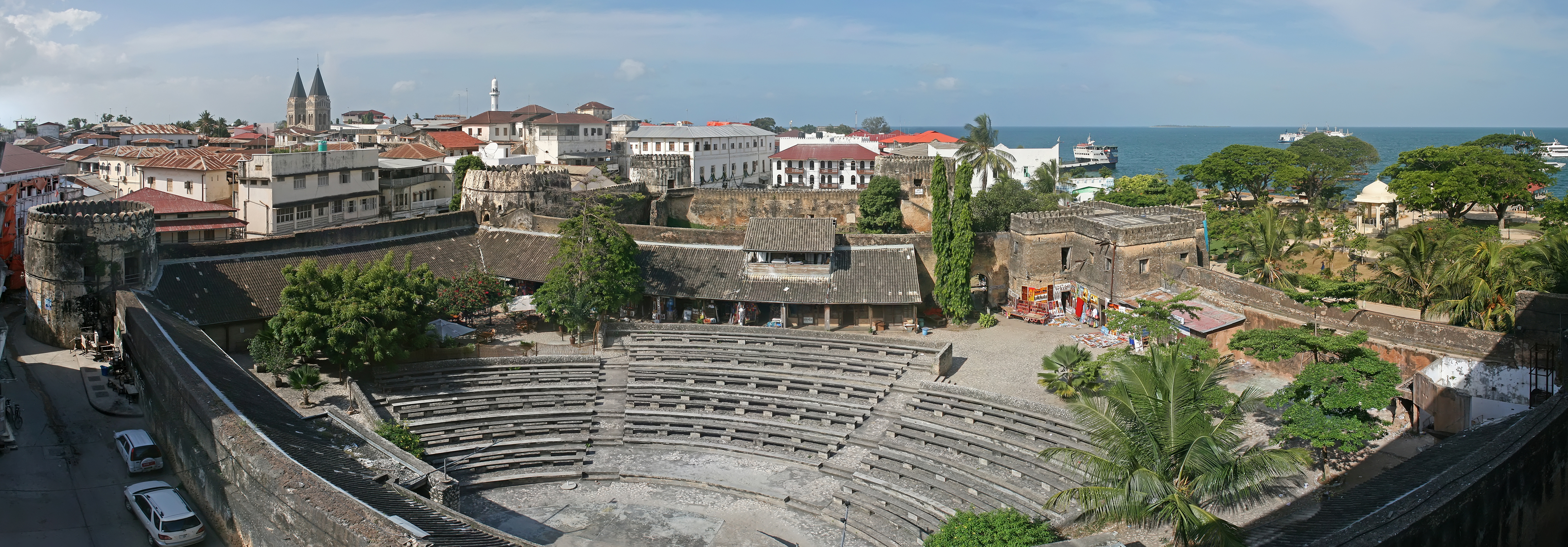
The old fort as seen from the House of Wonders

1. The famous House of Wonders (or "Palace of Wonders", also known as "Beit-al-Ajaib"), is located on the Mizingani Road along the Stone Town seafront. It was built in 1883 and restored after the Anglo-Zanzibar War of 1896. Formerly the Sultan's residence, it became the seat of the Afro-Shirazi Party after the revolution. It was the first building in Zanzibar to have electricity as well as the first building in East Africa to have a lift. Since 2000, its interior has been dedicated to a museum on Swahili and Zanzibar culture. In December 2020, during renovations, a large part of the building collapsed in a major accident.
2. The Old Fort ("Ngome Kongwe" in Swahili), adjacent to the House of Wonders, is a heavy stone fortress that was built in the 17th century by the Omanis. Also known as the Omani fort it was built by the early rulers to protect the city from European invasions. It has a roughly square shape and the internal courtyard is now a cultural centre with shops, workshops, and a small arena where live dance and music shows are held daily. The fort location is also used for the Zanzibar International Film Festival.
3. The Old Dispensary (or "Ithnashiri Dispensary") was built from 1887 to 1894 by a wealthy Indian trader, to serve as a charity hospital for the poor but was later used as a dispensary. It is one of the most finely decorated buildings of Stone Town, with large carved wooden balconies, stained-glass windows, and neo-classical stucco adornments. After falling into decay in the 1970s and 1980s, the building was accurately restored by the AKTC.
4. The Palace Museum (also known as the "Sultan's Palace", "Beit el-Sahel" in Arab) is another former sultan's palace, on the seafront, to the north of the House of Wonders. It was built in late 19th century and now hosts a museum about the daily life of the Zanzibari royal family, including items that belonged to Sayyida Salme, a former Zanzibar princess who fled to relocate in Europe with her husband.
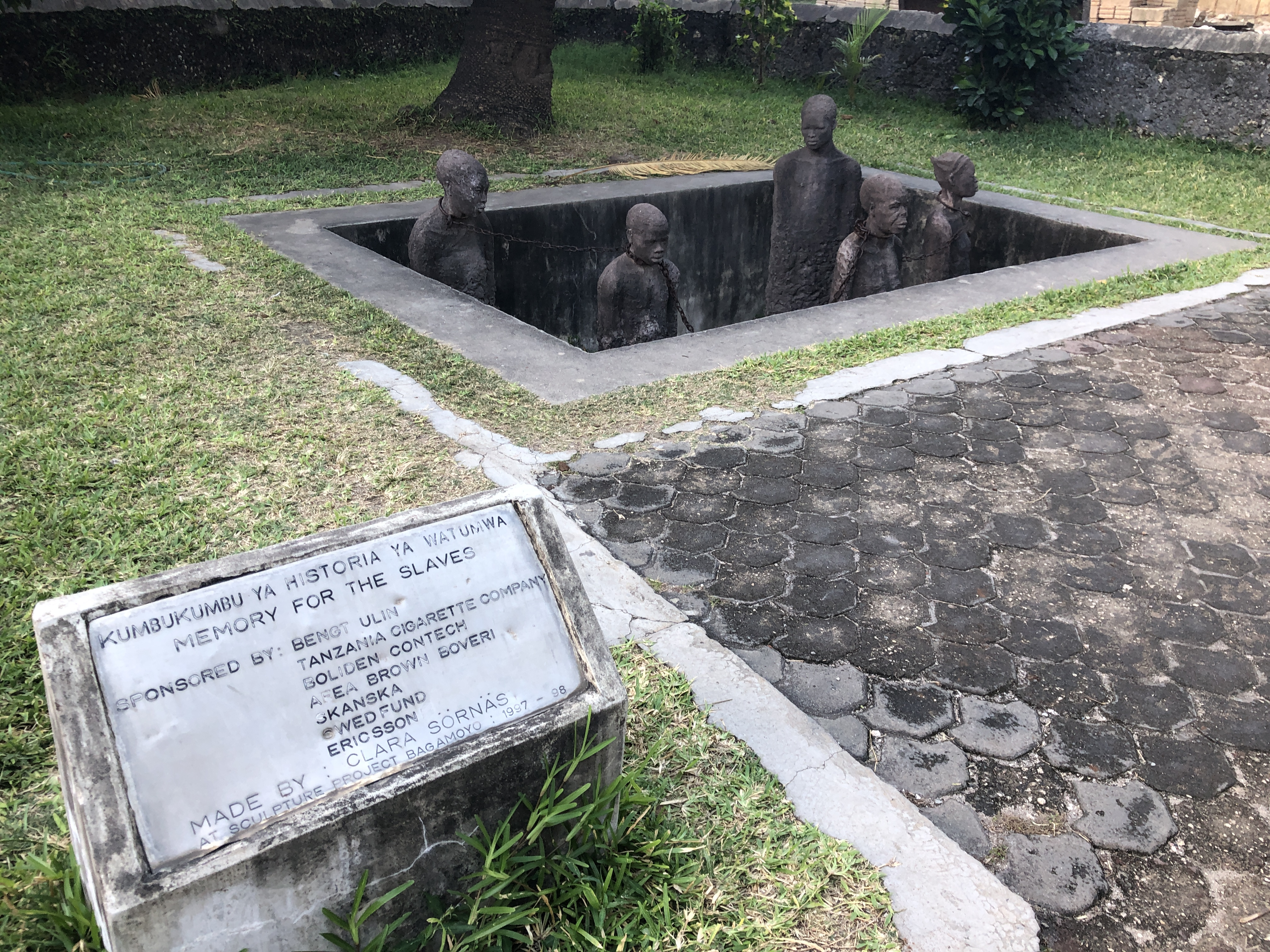
5. The Slave Monument, 2002, beside the Anglican cathedral
  The Anglican cathedral of Christ Church, on Mkunazini Road, was built at the end of the 19th century by Edward Steere, third bishop of Zanzibar. The cathedral was constructed in a large area at the centre of Stone Town that previously hosted the biggest slave market of Zanzibar; the place was deliberately chosen to celebrate the end of slavery, and the altar was in the exact spot where the main whipping post of the market used to be. A monument to the slaves, as well as a museum on the history of slavery, are besides the church.
6. The Roman Catholic Cathedral of St. Joseph was built by French missionaries between 1893 and 1897. The design of the church was based on that of the Marseille Cathedral, its façade, with two high spires, is one of the most well-known landmarks of Stone Town and can be seen from a distance when sailing into the harbor. The church is still operational today and holds regular mass on Sundays.
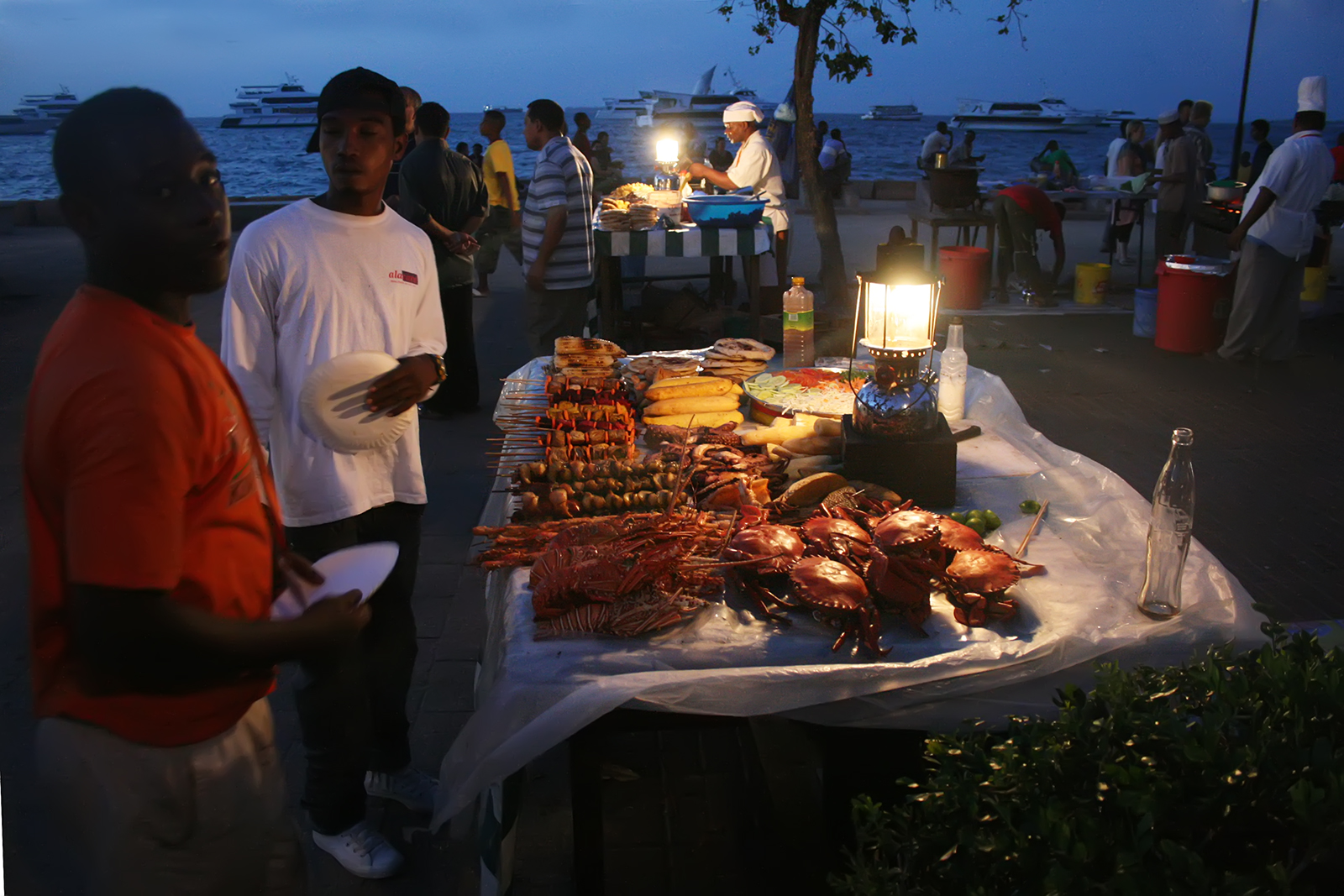
7. Zanzibari cuisine is sold at the Forodhani gardens.
  The Forodhani Gardens are a small park in the main sea walk of Stone Town, right in front of the Old Fort and the House of Wonders. The garden was recently restored for 3 million dollars by the Aga Khan Trust for Culture. Every evening after sunset the gardens host a popular, tourist-oriented market selling grilled seafood and other Zanzibari recipes which attracts both tourists and locals

== Transportation ==
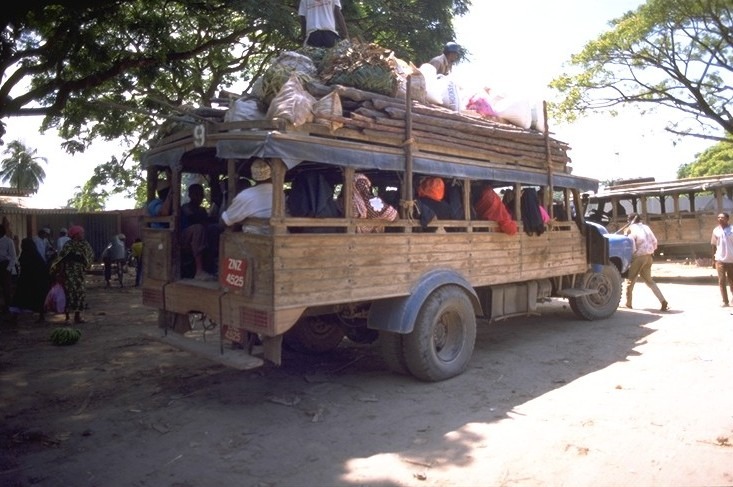
Zanzibari "mabasi" waiting for passengers at the Bus Terminal

The streets in Stone Town are very narrow and getting almost anywhere within the town must be done on foot. The narrow streets provide shade and almost everything is accessible from within the town. However, on slightly wider roads historically bicycles and now most recently motor cycles are used to transport people and goods. The town is accessible from Zanzibar and the rest of the region through three possible ports of entry.

The main form of public transport in Zanzibar are the daladala share taxis; and the main station is located by the Darajani Market. Daladalas connect Stone Town to several island locations, such as Bububu (a village north of Stone Town), the airport, the Amaan Stadium, Jangombe, and Magomeni, Zanzibar. For longer trips, "mabasi" (Swahili for "bus", singular "basi") are available, which are trucks adapted for passenger transport. The main "mabasi" station is also close to the Market and the "mabasi" network stretch across the entire island and is the cheapest form of long-distance transit.

The main Zanzibar island harbour is in the heart of Stone Town and regular ferries from Dar es Salaam and Pemba connect the town to the mainland. The town is also in close proximity to the Island's major airport. Zanzibar Airport, 9 kilometres (5.6 miles) south of Stone Town has flights to mainland Tanzania (especially Arusha and Dar es Salaam) as well as other African main airports such as Nairobi, Mombasa, and Johannesburg.

== Climate ==
Stone Town along with the entire Zanzibar Archipelago experiences a similar climate throughout the year. The island has a hot tropical weather all year round with the hottest months being February and March and the cooler months being July and August. During most months of the year there is significant rainfall with a long rain season spanning from March–May and a shorter rain season from November–December. The lesser dry season occurs between December–February and May–August and consequently is the peak tourist season due to beach tourism on the island.

Climate data for Stone Town
Month	Jan	Feb	Mar	Apr	May	Jun	Jul	Aug	Sep	Oct	Nov	Dec	Year
Record high °C (°F)	35 (95)	38 (100)	38 (100)	34 (93)	33 (91)	32 (90)	31 (88)	31 (88)	32 (90)	32 (90)	36 (97)	34 (93)	38 (100)
Mean daily maximum °C (°F)	32 (90)	32 (90)	32 (90)	31 (88)	30 (86)	29 (84)	29 (84)	29 (84)	30 (86)	31 (88)	31 (88)	32 (90)	31 (87)
Mean daily minimum °C (°F)	24 (75)	24 (75)	25 (77)	25 (77)	23 (73)	23 (73)	22 (72)	22 (72)	22 (72)	22 (72)	23 (73)	24 (75)	23 (74)
Record low °C (°F)	18 (64)	22 (72)	16 (61)	19 (66)	18 (64)	19 (66)	18 (64)	18 (64)	14 (57)	14 (57)	15 (59)	16 (61)	14 (57)
Average rainfall mm (inches)	53.7 (2.11)	53.9 (2.12)	116.0 (4.57)	178.6 (7.03)	131.8 (5.19)	35.3 (1.39)	29.5 (1.16)	23.9 (0.94)	14.8 (0.58)	52.0 (2.05)	75.9 (2.99)	80.9 (3.19)	846.3 (33.32)
Average rainy days	5	5	8	11	10	4	2	2	3	4	9	8	71
Source: MSN Weather

== Notable residents ==
- Freddie Mercury (Farrokh Bulsara), lead vocalist of the British rock band Queen, was born in Stone Town.
- Ali Muhsin al-Barwani, first foreign minister of independent Zanzibar
- Bi Kidude, singer
- David Livingstone, Scottish explorer and missionary
- Tippu Tip, slave trader
- Abdulrazak Gurnah, Nobel prize laureate in literature.

== Gallery ==
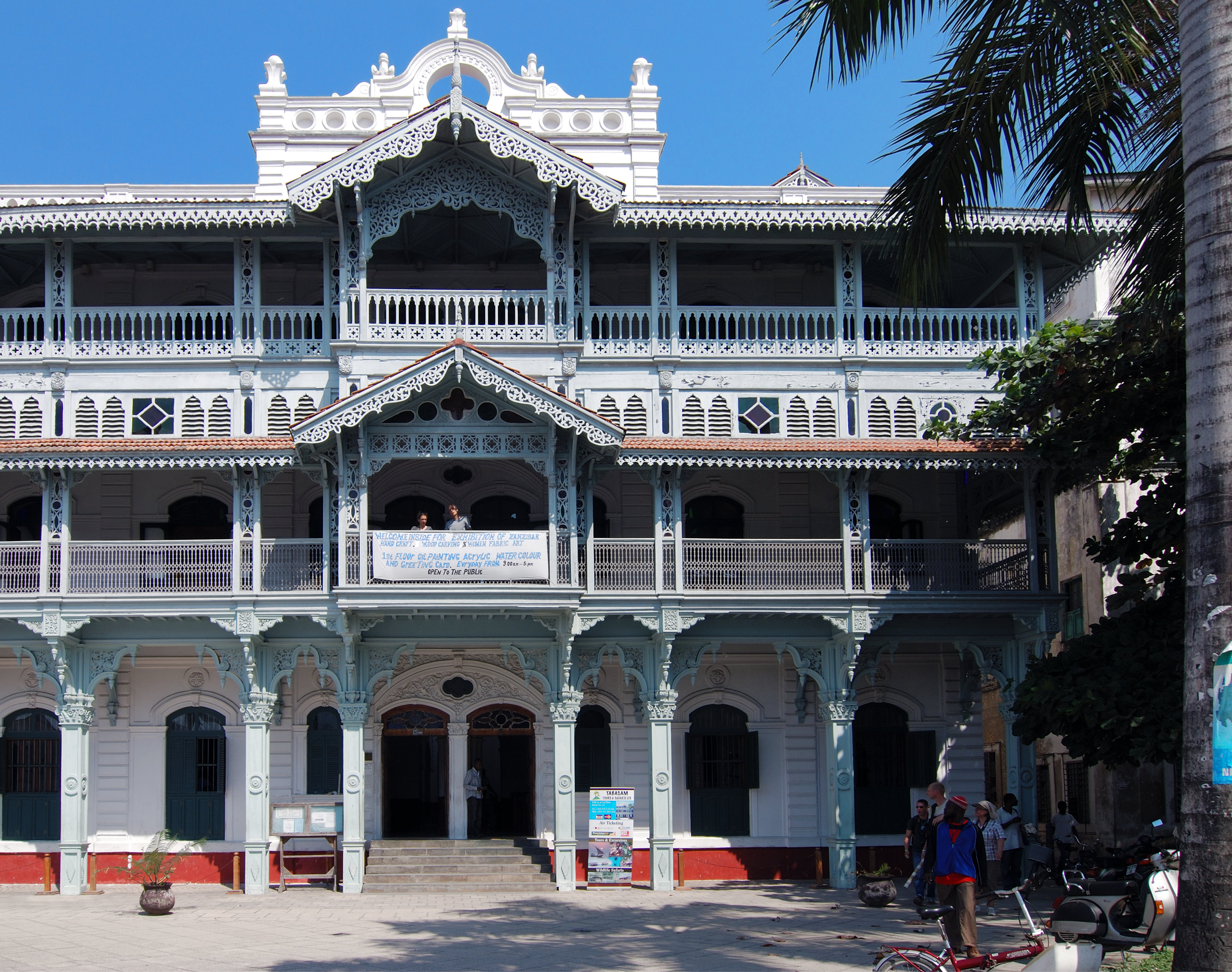
The Old Dispensary

Shangani Post Office (central facade)

Traditional door with carved frame

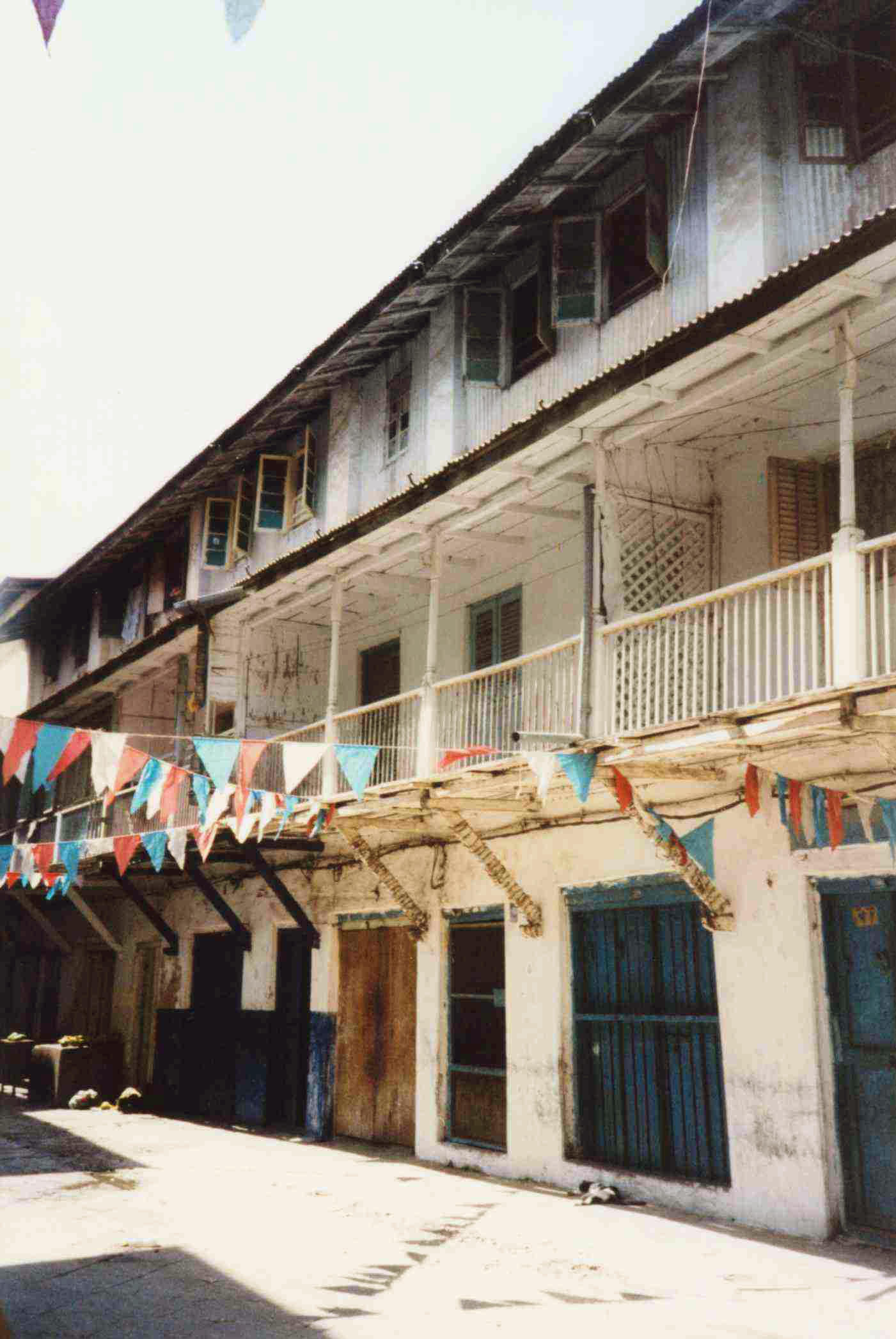
Birth house of Freddie Mercury

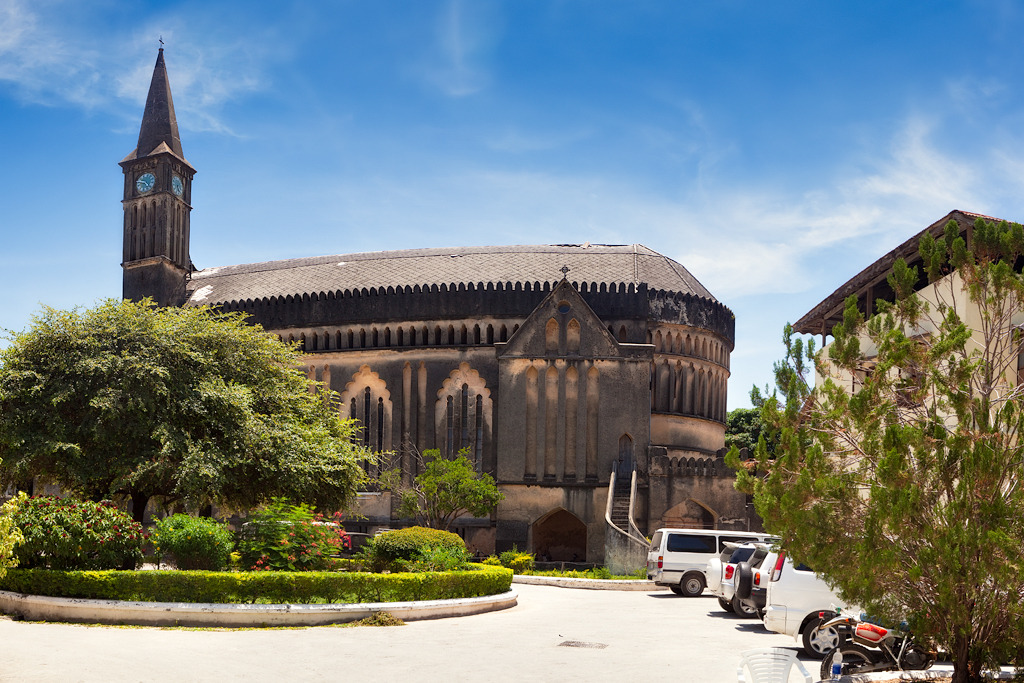
The Anglican Cathedral of Zanzibar

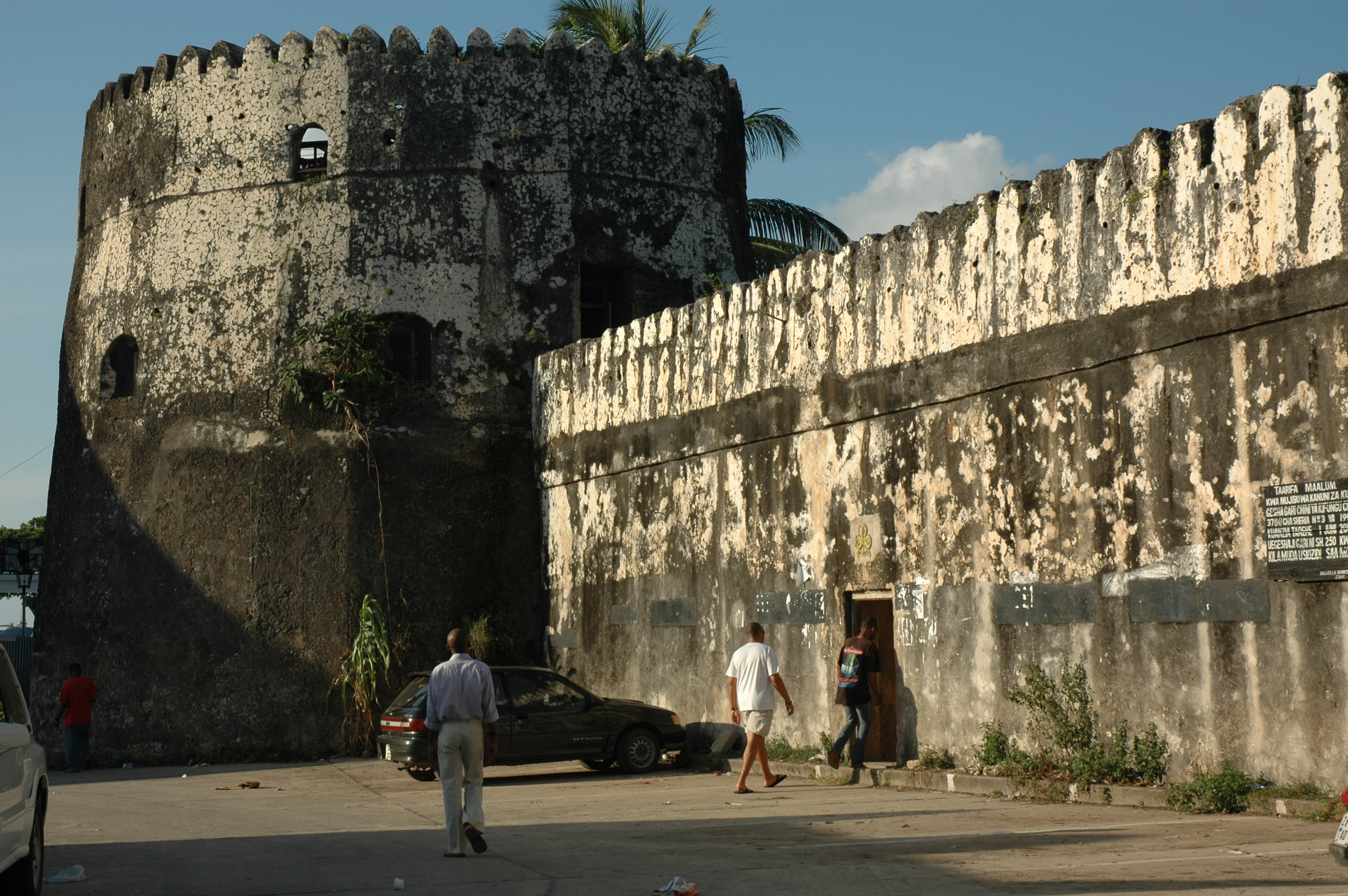
Old Fort

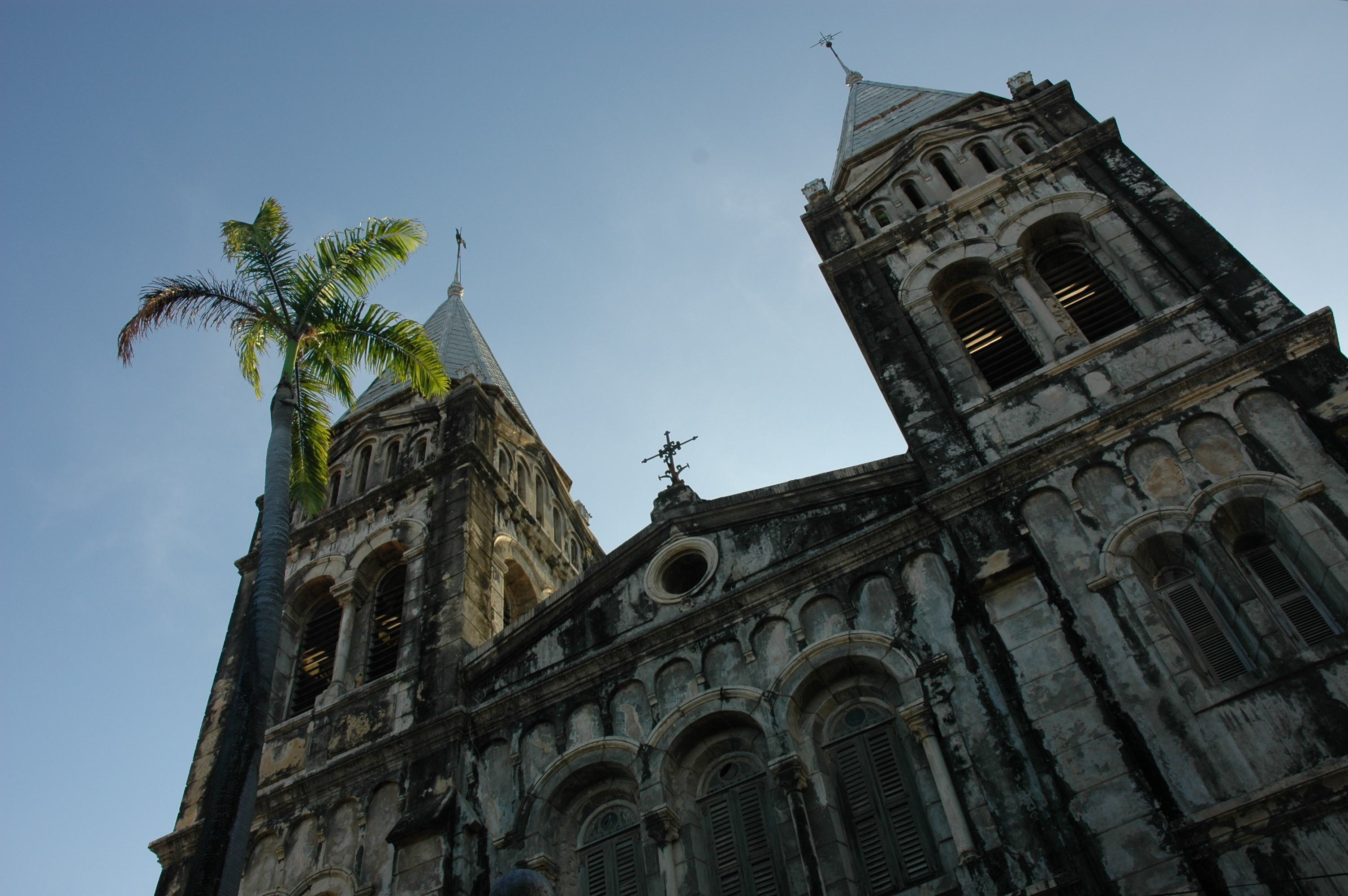
St. Joseph's Cathedral, Zanzibar

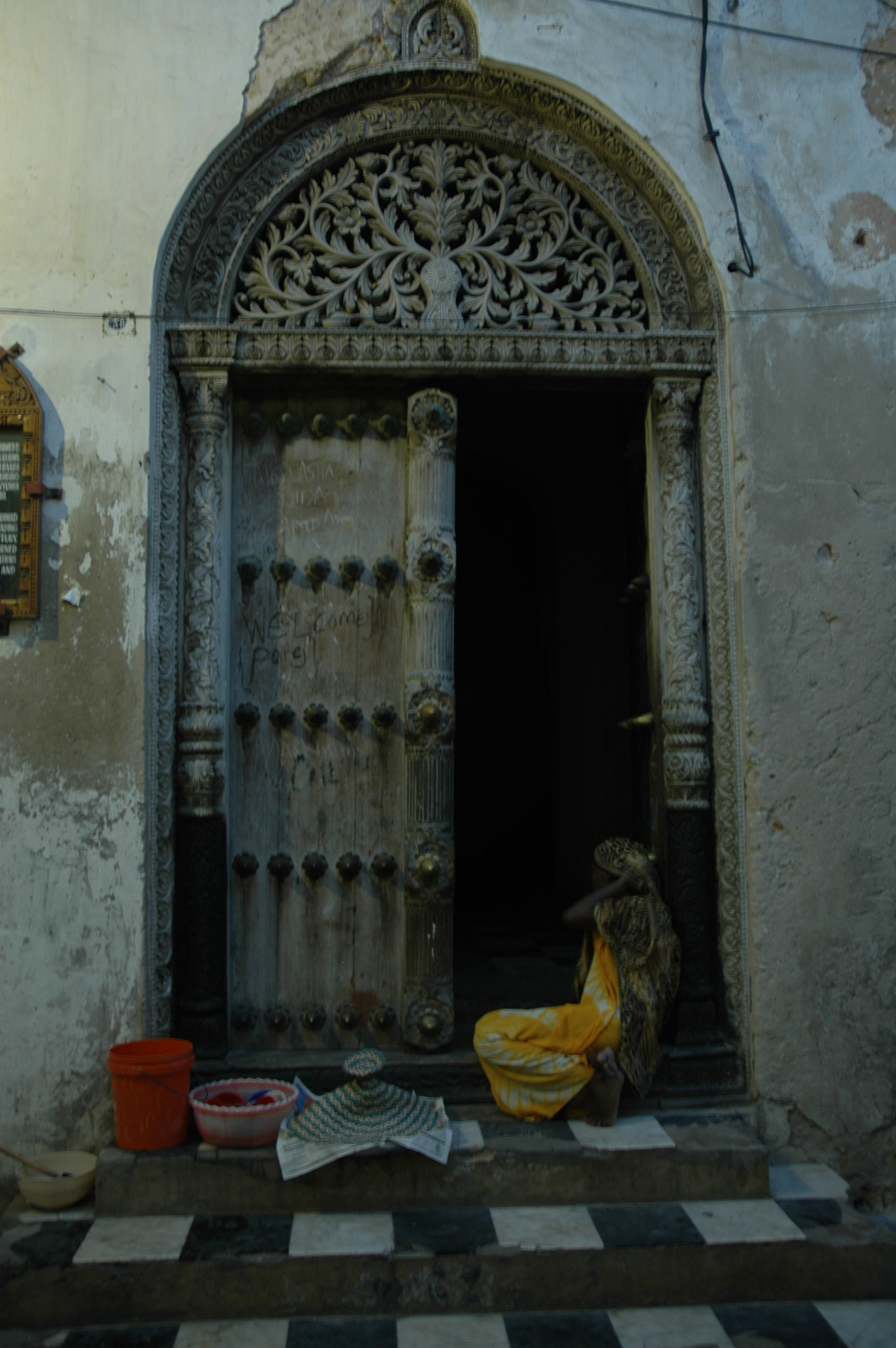
Swahili door

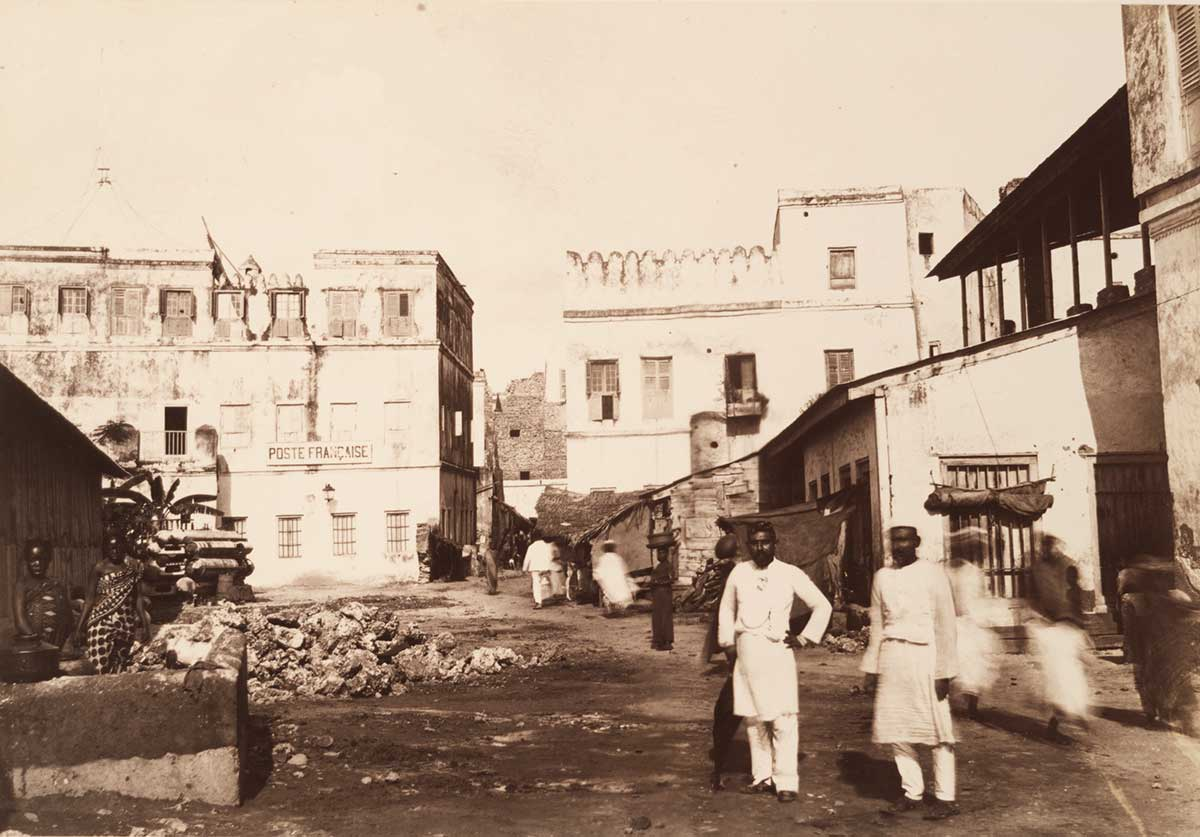
"Poste française". French post office with French flag in Stone Town, before 1900.

Tembo Hotel
