= Menai Bay =

Coastal bay in Tanzania

- Ghuba la Menai (Swahili)
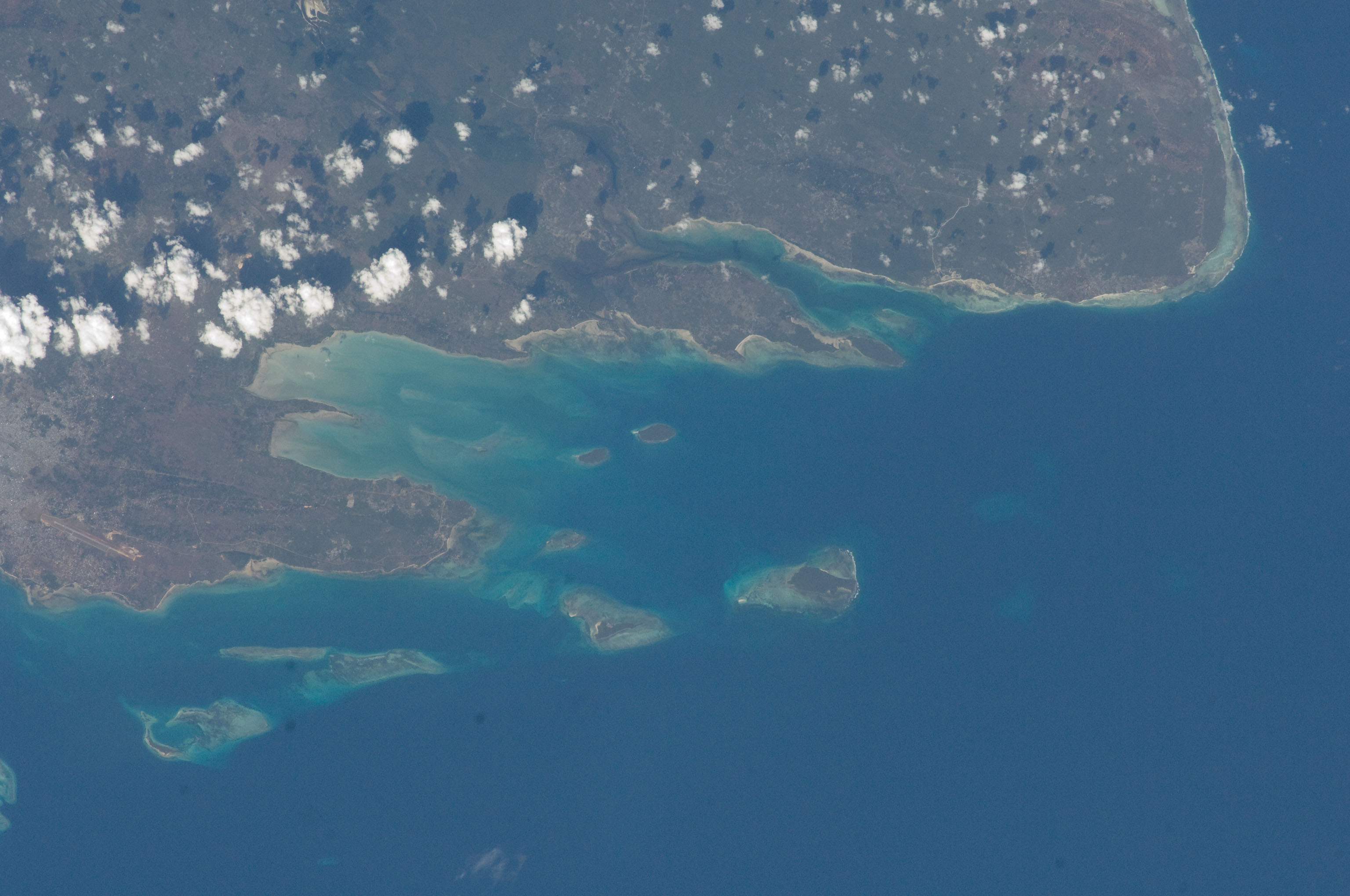
- Satellite view of Menai Bay of Zanzibar

- Location in Tanzania
- Location: Tanzania, Mjini Magharibi Region, Tanga City Council
- Group: Zanzibar Channel
- Coordinates: 6°22′12″S 39°20′43″E
- Type: Bay
- Ocean/sea sources: Indian Ocean
- Designation: Protected waterbody
- Max. length: 15 km (9.3 mi)
- Max. width: 10 km (6.2 mi)
- Islands: Kwale Island, Zanzibar, Pamunda Island, Sume Island, Miwi Island, Niamembe Island & Pungume Island
- Settlements: Fumba, Unguja Ukuu

Menai Bay (Ghuba ya Menai, in Swahili) is a bay in Mkinga District of Mjini Magharibi Region of Tanzania. The bay is geographically part of the Zanzibar Archipelago.

== Geography ==
It is a 10 km wide bay on the Zanzibar Channel of the Western Indian Ocean. The long coastline of Menai Bay has nineteen villages, with a total population of around 17,000. The villages are within the Unguja South Region of Zanzibar. The Menai Bay Conservation Area (MBCA) is a marine reserve protecting the habitats and biota of the bay area.

== Mangrove degradation ==
The mangroves in Menai Bay that are closest to settlements like Unguja Ukuu, Pete, and Uzi are losing the most of their natural state. Therefore, the western portion of Menai has more mangrove deterioration than the eastern part. Though there are currently legal and regulatory structures in place to slow the deterioration of mangroves, the rate of degradation in Zanzibar is concerning. B. gymnorrhiza, R. mucronata, and C. tagal are the most impacted mangrove species.

== Dolphins ==
There are eight species of delphinids in the vicinity of Zanzibar; however, the only two that live year-round in the Menai Bay Conservation Area (MBCA), which is situated off the southwest coast of Unguja Island, are the Indo-Pacific bottlenose dolphin (Tursiops aduncus) and the Indian Ocean humpback dolphin (Sousa plumbea). The MBCA's two dolphin species are both under peril from boat-based tourism and bycatch from fisheries. This fragility is highlighted by the low estimated population sizes of both species, 35 S. plumbea and 136 T. aduncus. However, there isn't any management in place for these species at the moment in terms of fishing or tourism. There has never been any prior study done in this field that looked into differences in distribution, occurrence, or behaviour. Furthermore, our knowledge of the effects and limitations that anthropogenic and environmental factors have on the distribution of the species is limited.
