= Pungume Island =

Protected island in Mjini Magharibi Region of Zanzibar, Tanzania

- Location within Tanzania

Geography
- Location: Zanzibar Channel
- Coordinates: 06°25′31″S 39°20′12″E
- Archipelago: Zanzibar Archipelago
- Adjacent to: Indian Ocean
- Length: 2.5 km (1.55 mi)
- Width: 0.96 km (0.597 mi)

Administration
- Tanzania
- Region: Mjini Magharibi Region
- District: Mjini
- Ward: Fumba

Demographics
- Languages: Swahili
- Ethnic groups: Hadimu

Pungume Island (Kisiwa cha Pungume, in Swahili) is a protected island located in Fumba ward of Mjini District in Mjini Magharibi Region, Tanzania. The largest of the Menai Bay islands, the island is composed of limestone and is a part of the Menai Bay Marine Conservation Area. The island was close to the location of the 2012 capsized ship MV Skagit.

The island boasts some of the best fishing in the archipelago. In one study it was found that roughly 27% of respondents thought Pungume Island was the best location for seasonal closure for fish stock recovery, while almost one-third thought the islets of Nyemembe and Miwi were the best options.
