= Pamunda Island =

Protected island in Mjini Magharibi Region of Zanziabr, Tanzania

- Location within Tanzania

Geography
- Location: Zanzibar Channel
- Coordinates: 06°21′08″S 39°18′17″E
- Archipelago: Zanzibar Archipelago
- Adjacent to: Indian Ocean
- Length: 1.3 km (0.81 mi)
- Width: 0.3 km (0.19 mi)

Administration
- Tanzania
- Region: Mjini Magharibi Region
- District: Mjini
- Ward: Fumba

Demographics
- Languages: Swahili
- Ethnic groups: Hadimu

Pamunda Island or Komunda Island (Kisiwa cha Pamunda, in Swahili) is a protected island located in Fumba ward of Mjini District in Mjini Magharibi Region, Tanzania. One of the Menai Bay islands, the island is part of the Menai Bay Marine Conservation Area. The native Eucheuma denticulatum grows abundantly around Pamunda Island.
