= Ukombe Island =

Protected island in Mjini Magharibi Region of Zanziabr, Tanzania

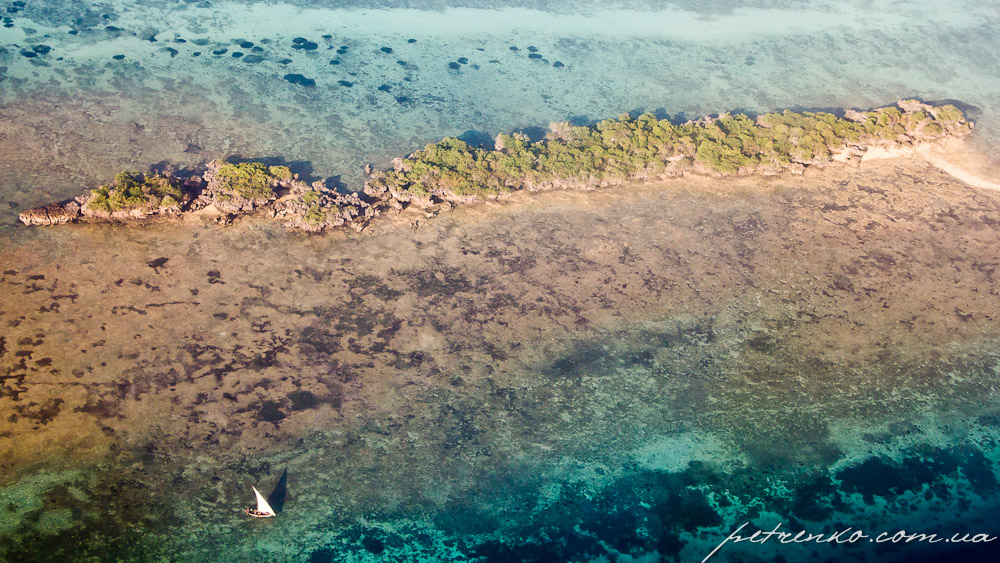
- Bird's eye view of Ukombe Island of Zanzibar

- Location within Tanzania

Geography
- Location: Zanzibar Channel
- Coordinates: 06°17′31″S 39°13′27″E
- Archipelago: Zanzibar Archipelago
- Adjacent to: Indian Ocean
- Length: 1.0 km (0.62 mi)
- Width: 0.8 km (0.5 mi)

Administration
- Tanzania
- Region: Mjini Magharibi Region
- District: Mjini
- Ward: Dimani

Demographics
- Languages: Swahili
- Ethnic groups: Hadimu

Ukombe Island (Kisiwa cha Ukombe, in Swahili) is a protected island located in Dimani ward of Mjini District in Mjini Magharibi Region, Tanzania. The island is part of the Menai Bay Marine Conservation Area.

Despite being a marine sanctuary, the island's reefs have been threatened by fishermen using sharp iron rods, known as umangu, to catch octopuses, which destroys coral reefs. Since there are no laws governing the harvesting of wild bivalves, anyone can gather bivalves of any size. The inhabitants of Fumba have also identified since netting near the sand banks of islands like Pungume, Kwale, and Ukombe as a threat to biodiversity, even though this practice is carried out secretly.
