= Niamembe Island =

Protected island in Mjini Magharibi Region of Zanziabr, Tanzania

- Location within Tanzania

Geography
- Location: Zanzibar Channel
- Coordinates: 06°21′25″S 39°21′11″E
- Archipelago: Zanzibar Archipelago
- Adjacent to: Indian Ocean
- Length: 1.55 km (0.963 mi)
- Width: 0.62 km (0.385 mi)

Administration
- Tanzania
- Region: Mjini Magharibi Region
- District: Mjini
- Ward: Fumba

Demographics
- Languages: Swahili
- Ethnic groups: Hadimu

Niamembe Island (Kisiwa cha Niamembe, in Swahili) is a protected island located in Fumba ward of Mjini District in Mjini Magharibi Region, Tanzania. One of the Menai Bay islands, the island is a part of the Menai Bay Marine Conservation Area and is composed of limestone.
