= Kwale Island, Zanzibar =

Protected island in Mjini Magharibi Region of Zanziabr, Tanzania

Kwale Island
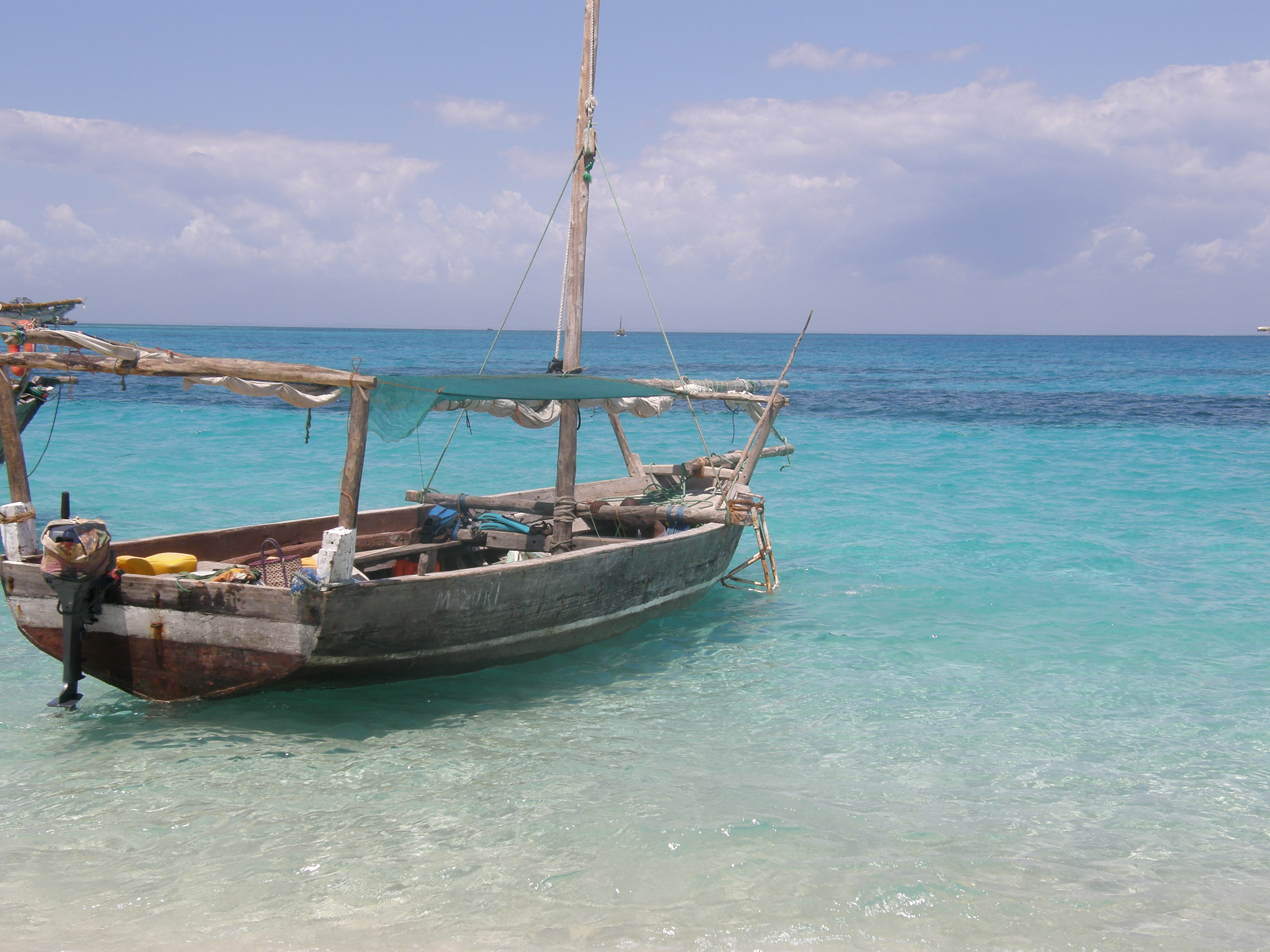
- Sandbank next to Kwale Island of Zanizbar

- Location within Tanzania

Geography
- Location: Zanzibar Channel
- Coordinates: 06°22′44″S 39°17′14″E
- Archipelago: Zanzibar Archipelago
- Adjacent to: Indian Ocean
- Length: 0.9 km (0.56 mi)
- Width: 0.6 km (0.37 mi)

Administration
- Tanzania
- Region: Mjini Magharibi Region
- District: Mjini
- Ward: Fumba

Demographics
- Languages: Swahili
- Ethnic groups: Hadimu

Kwale Island (Kisiwa cha Kwale, in Swahili) is a protected island located in Fumba ward of Mjini District in Mjini Magharibi Region, Tanzania. The island is included in the marine conservation area of Menai Bay (Menai Bay Conservation Area).

== Tourism and conservation ==
Located on Zanzibar's western coast, Kwale Island is a popular tourist destination that offers snorkeling, dolphin viewing, and sandback activities. Numerous small boats, including tour boats (Safari Blue) and local fishing boats, may be seen along the Fumba beach. The tour boats transport visitors to Kwale Island and around Menai Bay. Plastics are among the many various types of garbage that severely damage the beach. The samples were collected from the main Kwale Island picnic area, the beach outside the settlement, and the island near Fumba Beach. It is thought that the location is somewhat contaminated.

Since there are no laws governing the harvesting of wild bivalves, anyone can gather bivalves of any size; the residents of Fumba have also identified since netting near the sand banks of islands like Pungume, Kwale, and Ukombe as a threat to biodiversity, even though this practice is carried out covertly. In spite of the island's status as a marine sanctuary, fishermen have been using sharp iron rods, known as "umangu"' to catch Octopuses, which destroys coral reefs.

== Coral bleaching of 1999 ==
With the exception of the Chume Reef, which is south of Zanzibar town, where coral cover dropped from 51.9% in 1997 to 27.5% in 1999, and Kwale, where coral cover dropped to 29.7% in 1997 and 13.3% in 1999, Unguja reefs did not appear to be seriously impacted by coral bleaching. According to the 1999 coral reef assessment and monitoring, the significant bleaching event had an impact on every reef evaluated. Approximately 80% of the corals on Tutia, Mafia Island, and the reefs on Misali Island near Pemba perished, as a result of severe or catastrophic coral mortality. 30% to 55% of hard corals at Chumbe and Kwale in Zanzibar and Mnazi Bay in Mtwara had intermediate levels of coral mortality.
