= Sume Island =

Protected island in Mjini Magharibi Region of Zanziabr, Tanzania

- Location within Tanzania

Geography
- Location: Zanzibar Channel
- Coordinates: 06°18′47″S 39°19′03″E
- Archipelago: Zanzibar Archipelago
- Adjacent to: Indian Ocean
- Length: 0.3 km (0.19 mi)
- Width: 0.07 km (0.043 mi)

Administration
- Tanzania
- Region: Mjini Magharibi Region
- District: Mjini
- Ward: Fumba

Demographics
- Languages: Swahili
- Ethnic groups: Hadimu

Sume Island (Kisiwa cha Sume, in Swahili) is a protected island located in Fumba ward of Mjini District in Mjini Magharibi Region, Tanzania. The island is included in the Menai Bay Marine Conservation Area. Sume reef protects on the biodiverse island. Field observations of Acropora spp. reefs on Sume Island in southern Zanzibar indicate that native Eucheuma denticulatum is flourishing there.

Anadara antiquata from Sume Island
