= Menai Bay Conservation Area =

Conservation area in Zanzibar, Tanzania

- IUCN category VI (protected area with sustainable use of natural resources)
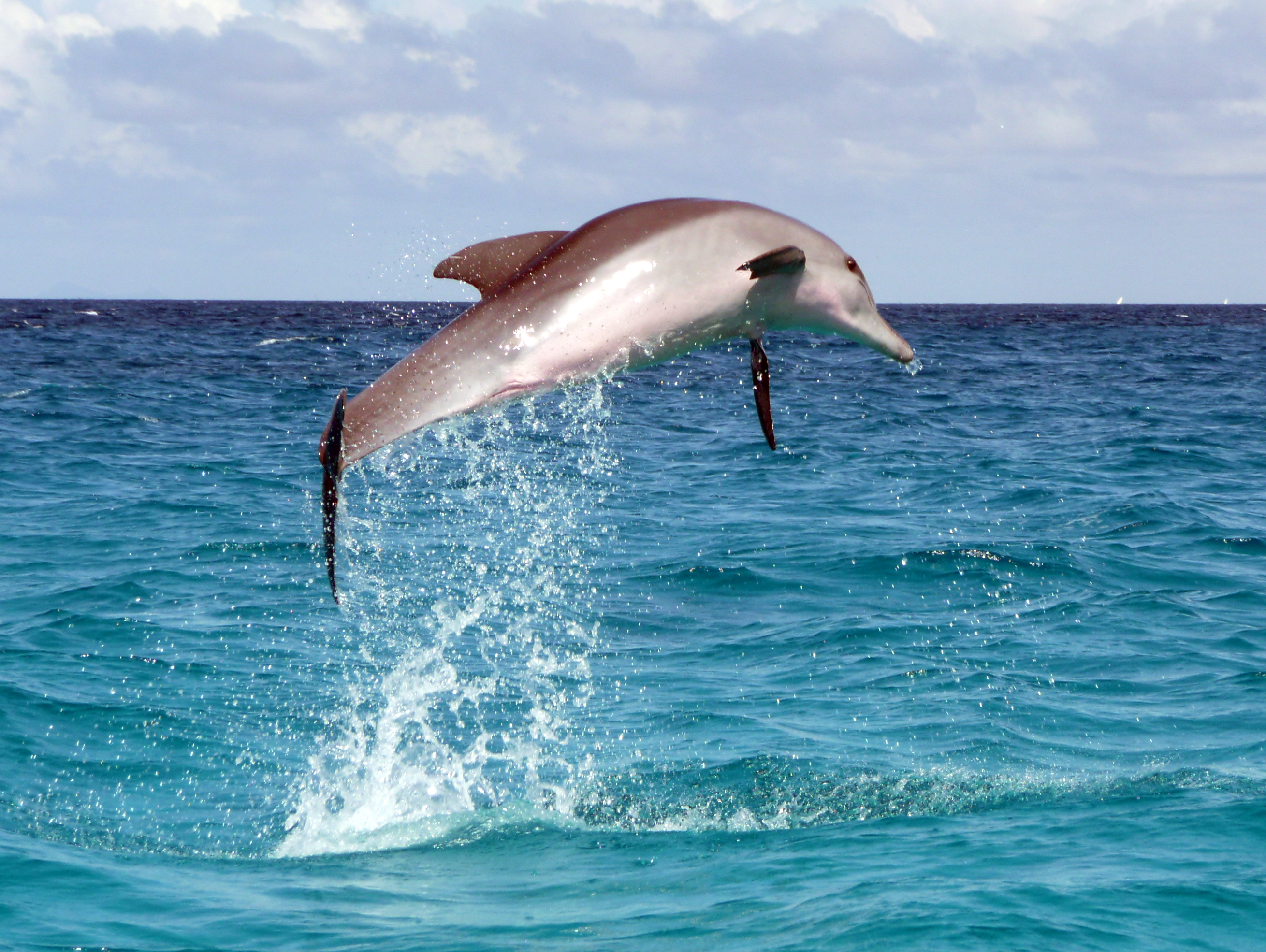
- Dolphins in the Menai Bay in Indian Ocean off Unguja coast.

- Location of Menai Bay Conservation Area.
- Coordinates: 6°23′0″S 39°22′00″E
- Area: 470 km^{2} (180 sq mi)
- Established: August 1997
- Governing body: Fisheries Department

The Menai Bay Conservation Area (MBCA) is located in Menai Bay, Zanzibar Tanzania. At 470 square kilometres (180 sq mi), it is Zanzibar's largest marine protected area. It was officially established as a conservation area in August 1997 in the traditional fishing area, known as Unguja Island, covering the tropical marine environment comprising extensive coral reefs, tropical fish, sea grasses, and mangrove forests. In addition to controlling illegal fishing, MBCA's alternative initiatives have included bee keeping, mangrove replanting, tree nurseries and tourism. The management of the MBCA falls upon the Fisheries Department and the bay's local villages. It is rated by the IUCN as Category VI Managed Resource Protected Area.

The conservation project started operating one year after it was formally established. The project was initiated by WWF and has been fully supported with funds by USAID, the British Government and Switzerland. It is a participatory project with community of 19 villages in the project area actively involved in pursuing the conservation efforts, and to this end they have set up village level Conservation Committees to restrain illegal fishing using circular nets and blasting techniques. Of all the villages, the villagers of Kizimkazi on the eastern part of the project area have been successful in their conservation efforts largely because of good network of paved roads and financial support from WWF. These efforts have attracted 200 bottlenose and humpback dolphins to the shores of their village. The villagers who were earlier killing these animals for food are now deriving economic benefits working with their boats as guides to show the dolphins to visitors. About 20,000 tourists have visited the area in 1998.

== Legislation ==
Marine Reserves were designated in 1975 but were not legislated. However, as the legislation of the Marine Parks and Reserves Act 1994 came into effect, five marines reserves and two marine parks came to be established. The new marine protected area that came to be established in 1997 was named the Marine Bay Conservation Area. It is situated on the south coast of Zanzibar. It administratively includes the islands of Unguja (also known as Zanzibar Island) and Pemba Island, with operation and management responsibility decreed as a joint effort of the local government and village community.

== Geography ==
Located in southwest of Unguja Island of the Zanzibar Archipelago, has six islets, a coast line of 61 km and is the largest conservation area in Zanzibar. Islands protected inside the conservation are Ukombe Island, Kwale Island, kamunda Islands, Sume Island, Miwi Island, Niamembe Island and Pungume Island. The average water depth in the bay area is about 10 m during high tide. Initially the reserve area covered 17 villages with a population of about 16,000 people with fishing in the reserve area as their main avocation (other avenues being agriculture, livestock, carpentry and trading). The initial 17 villages covered under the project were Fumba, Bweleo, Dimani, Kombeni, Mtende, Kizimkazi Dimbani, Kizimkazi, Mkunguni, Muyuni A, Muyuni B, Muyuni C, Muungoni, Bungi, Unguja Ukuu, Kaepwani, Unguja Ukuu Kaebona, Kikungwi, Uzi and Ng’amb’wa. By 2003, 19 of the area villages were participating in the conservation work.

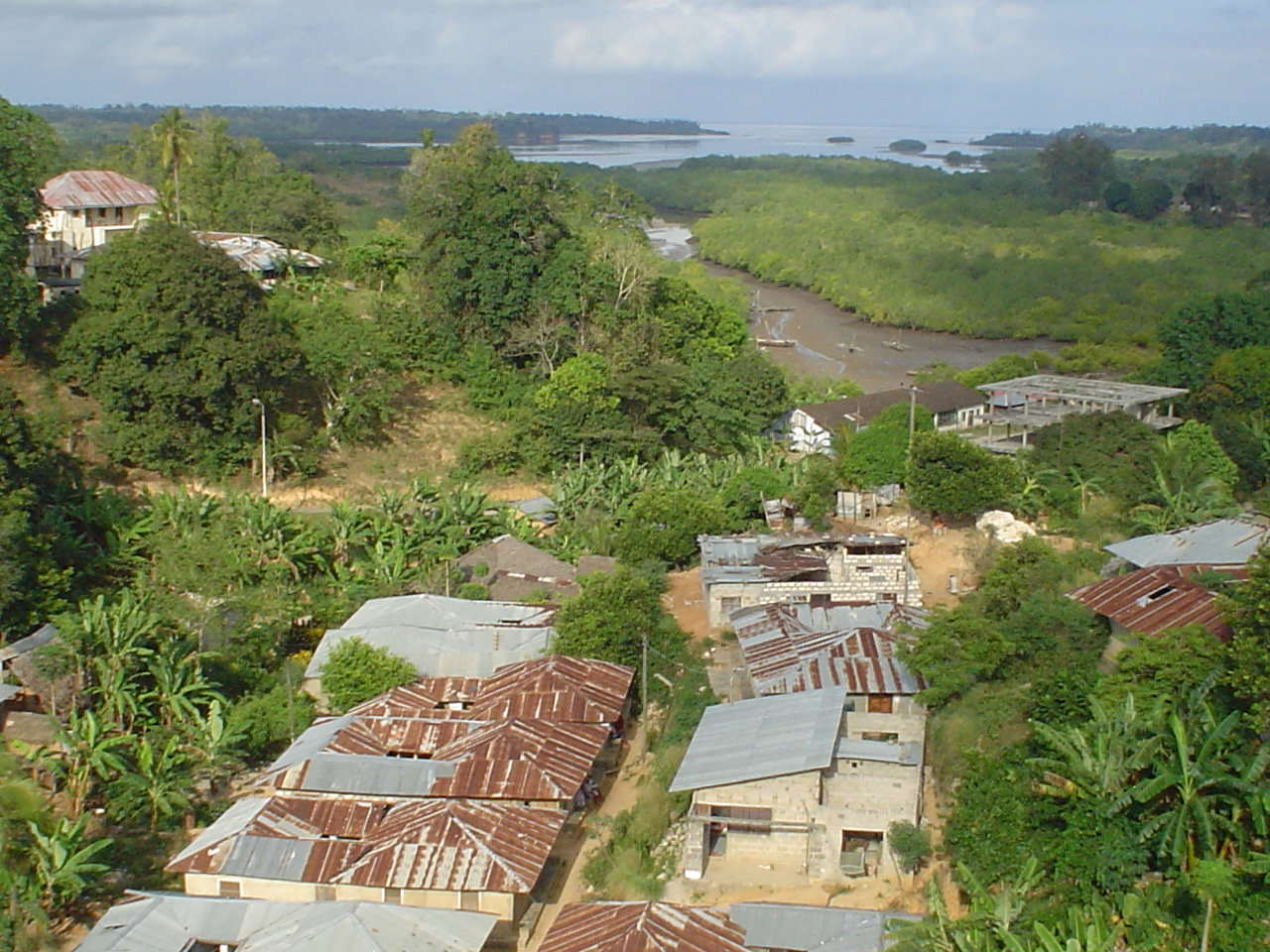
Mangrove forests in Pemba Island.

Traditionally, the Menai Bay area is a heterogeneous habitat of mangrove forest, sea grasses, coral rag land, and a marine ecosystem with a rich biodiversity of in biodiversity of plant, invertebrate and bird species. Mangrove forests abound on Uzi, Nyamanzi, Nga’mbwa shorelines and also around some of the islets. Mangrove resources have provided livelihood to generations of community residing around Menai Bay either directly or indirectly. The forests have been the source of wood for domestic fuel and also an economic source of income, the extraction of which has been the prerogative of the women, with men concentrating on its use as construction material and to make charcoal. The mangroves have 10 different species that protect the coast against the open sea. Locals have been traditionally harvesting them for boat building also.

The coral reefs which are of the fringe coral type are found all along the coast line of Zanzibar, which includes MBCA, contain layers of calcium carbonate created by secretions of millions of polyps (150 species have been reported in the entire coastline); they provide food and shelter to fish, crabs, lobsters and clams. The open sea in the MBCA is rich in phytoplankton and zooplankton, which serve as food for sardines and small pelagic fish having commercial value for local fishermen. It is also a safe habitat for marine mammals such as, whales, dolphins and dugongs, as well as for sea turtles.

== History ==
A forest reserve decree of 1950 protects the mangrove in the project area. In 1978, a subcommission of fisheries was established which was a followed by sea weed farming in one of the villages of the project area where after in the 1980s the area starts deteriorating.

In the 1980s and 1990s, fishing operations had a deleterious effect on the conditions in the area due to increased number of fishermen (many from outside the area) also adopting unacceptable practices for fishing such as dynamite, beach seines and kigumi fishing, where corals are broken deliberately to force fish out into the surrounding net. Local poisonous weed called "Utupa" also aggravated the problem. Studies also indicated that the traditional "dago" system of temporary fishing camp during the fishing season was replaced by permanent settlements, which caused serious damage to the coral reefs of the bay. In order to control these activities, local villagers started operating patrols in the fishing zones, such as in Fumba peninsula, with proactive support of the Commission of Natural Resources. Though these operations failed to be effective due to inadequate knowledge of such operations, it resulted in the eventual creation of the MBCA.

In the early 1990s, the heavy degradation of the area is confirmed by Institute of Marine Science (IMS) and WWF establish their office in 1990 in Zanzibar. A fund for self-reliance gets established in 1991. In 1994, the World Wide Fund for Nature established a conservation program in MBCA to address over–fishing. A marine reserve was announced in August 1997.

== Practices ==
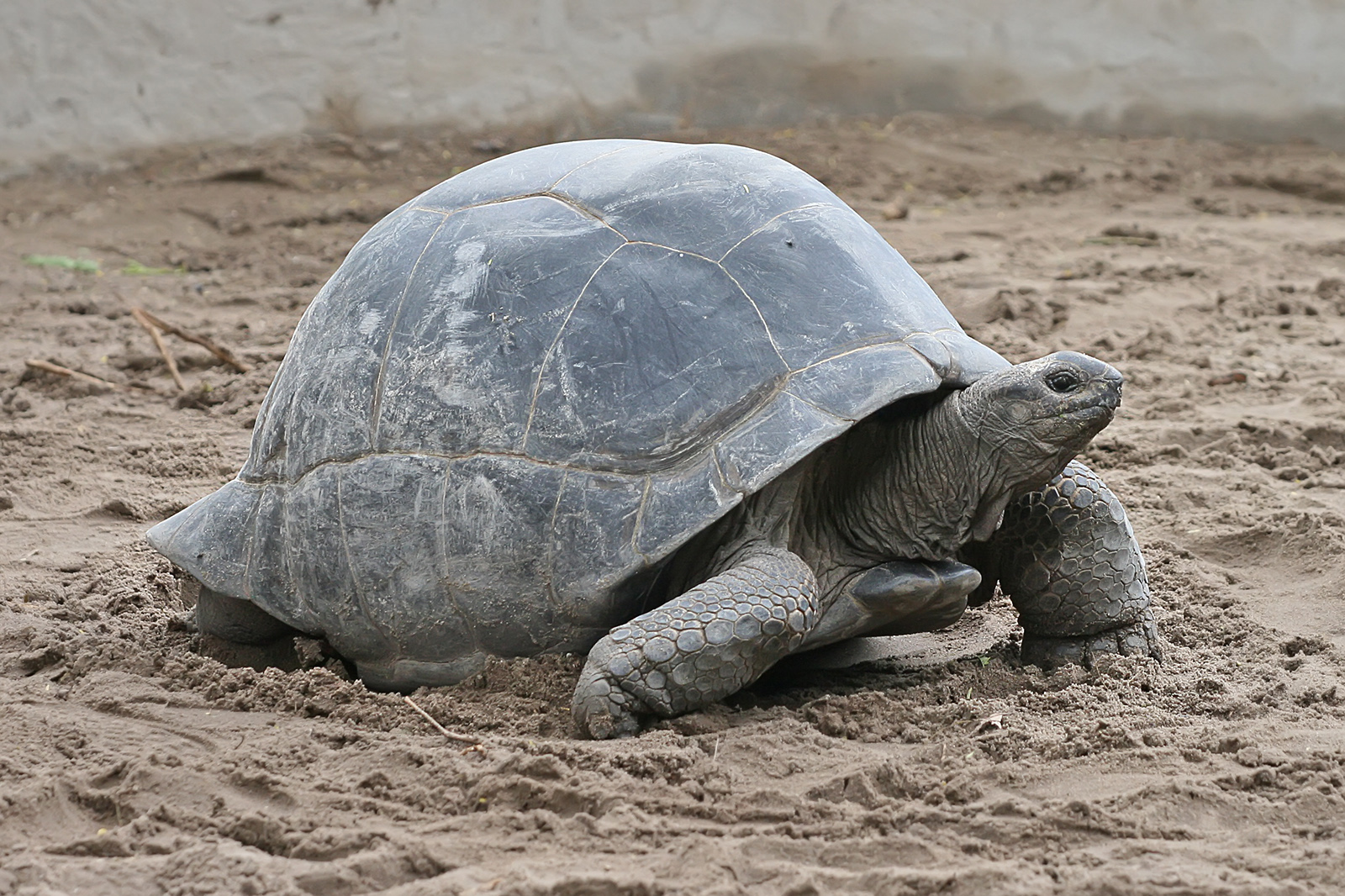
Aldabra giant tortoise (Geochelone gigantea)

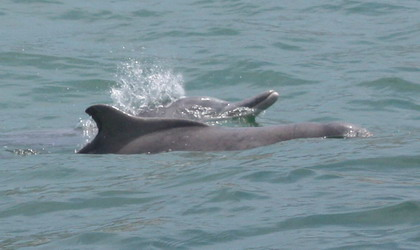
Indo-Pacific humpback dolphins.

The historical practices in the area consisted of cultivation of Eucheuma seaweed and use of Ulva and Enteromorpha species as fish baits; green algae was also collected for medicinal use. USAID supported pilot projects in three islands where seaweed grew densely, given the protection provided at these locations from waves. The subspecies of Eucheuma, namely Eucheuma spinosum and Eucheuma striatum, were selected for the purpose by adopting fixed bottom cultivation method. They were also developed as demonstration farms to provide training and extension services to the local fishermen in enhancing the quality of dry seaweed. Though Eucheuma spinosum was grown largely in the area, Eucheuma cottonii was also considered but proved to be not profitable due to climatic effects. Commercial collection of seaweed were also started by private companies, which contributed nearly 20% to the island's earning and employed a significant fraction of women. The local women have engaged in seaweed farming and coconut-husk weaving. However, a "monopsonyl arrangement" of farming controlled by individual buyers to buy the yield at their predetermined rates, on the basis of the initial supply of materials such as lines and seaweed seedlings to the producers, is in vogue.

In 1998, 160 resident Indo-Pacific bottlenose dolphins and 69 Indo-Pacific humpback dolphins were reported under a dolphin photo-ID project undertaken by the Stockholm University and the Institute of Marine Sciences of Zanzibar. Evaluation carried out in 2001 indicated that as a result of control of bad practices followed in the past in fishing operations, fish catch has improved. Other improvements were establishment of a radio network, providing environmental education to the villagers and community members assisting in legal proceeding in the court against unlawful activities. In the same year Kizimkazi became the headquarters of MBCA, and the area has also started attracting tourists. While the first phase of the project was completed, in June 2002, further activity has been continued under the World Bank funded project titled the "Marine and Coastal Environment Management Project" (MACEMP) which includes the MBCA area also under the multimillion-dollar funding programme. In 2003, under a grant received from the McKnight Foundation, instituted bivalve farming in the Fumba Peninsula of the project area to increase resource base of the intertidal zone and of wild stocks of oysters, isognomon, mussels and clams. In 2002, approximately 12,000 tourists visited the MBCA.

Now, MBCA supports 2000 fishers and is also a tourist area. Non-resident fishers are permitted to use the area for fishing only after buying a specific permit. The revenue so generated is used for management and community development of the area.
