= Mjini Magharibi Region =

Region of Tanzania

Mjini Magharibi Region Mkoa wa Mjini Magharibi (Swahili)
- Region
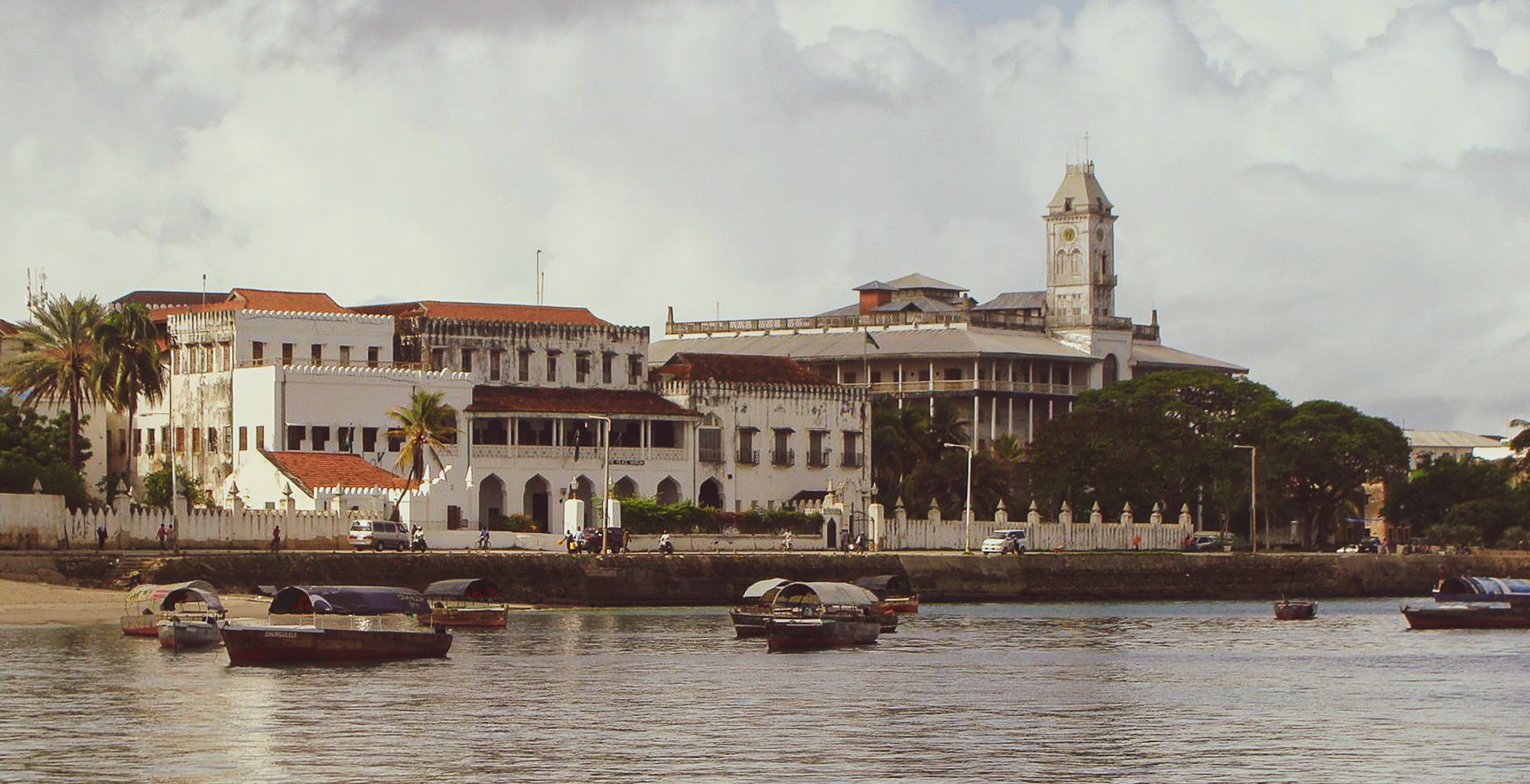
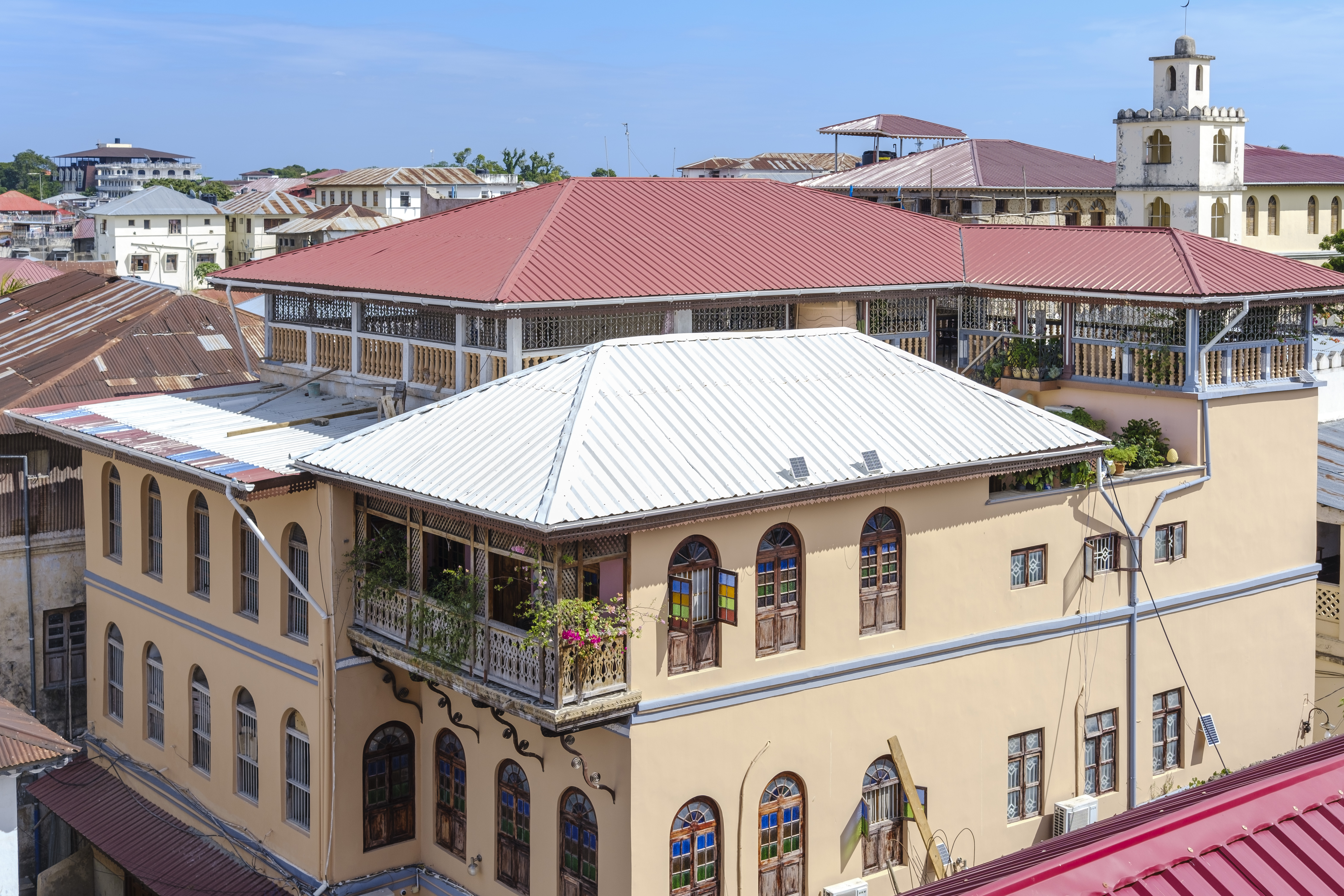
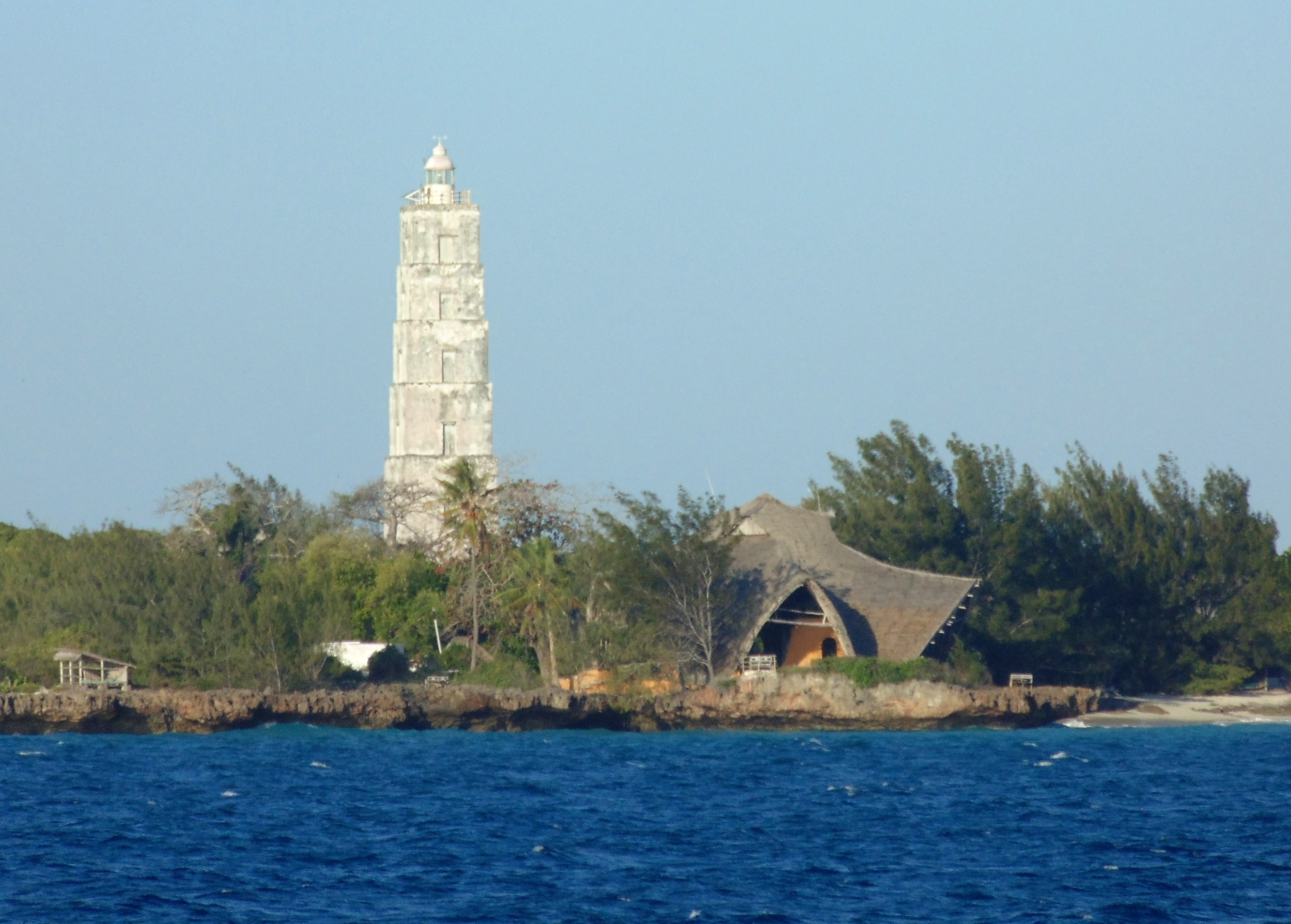
- From top to bottom: Stonetown scene, view of Stonetown & Lighthouse in Chumbe Island
- Nickname: Home of Stonetown
- Location in Tanzania
- Coordinates: 6°13′47.28″S 39°15′29.88″E
- Country: Tanzania
- Named for: Unguja Island
- Capital: Zanzibar City
- Districts: List: Magharibi District; Mjini District

Area
  - Region: 230 km^{2} (89 sq mi)
  - Rank: 31st of 31

Population (2022 census)
  - Region: 893,169
  - Rank: 26th of 31
  - Density: 3,900/km^{2} (10,000/sq mi)
  - Urban: 709,809
- Demonym: Mjini Zanzibari

Ethnic groups
  - Settler: Swahili
  - Native: Hadimu
- Time zone: UTC+3 (EAT)
- Postcode: 71xxx
- Area code: 024
- ISO 3166 code: TZ-15
- HDI (2021): 0.718 high · 1st
- Website: Official website
- Symbols of Tanzania
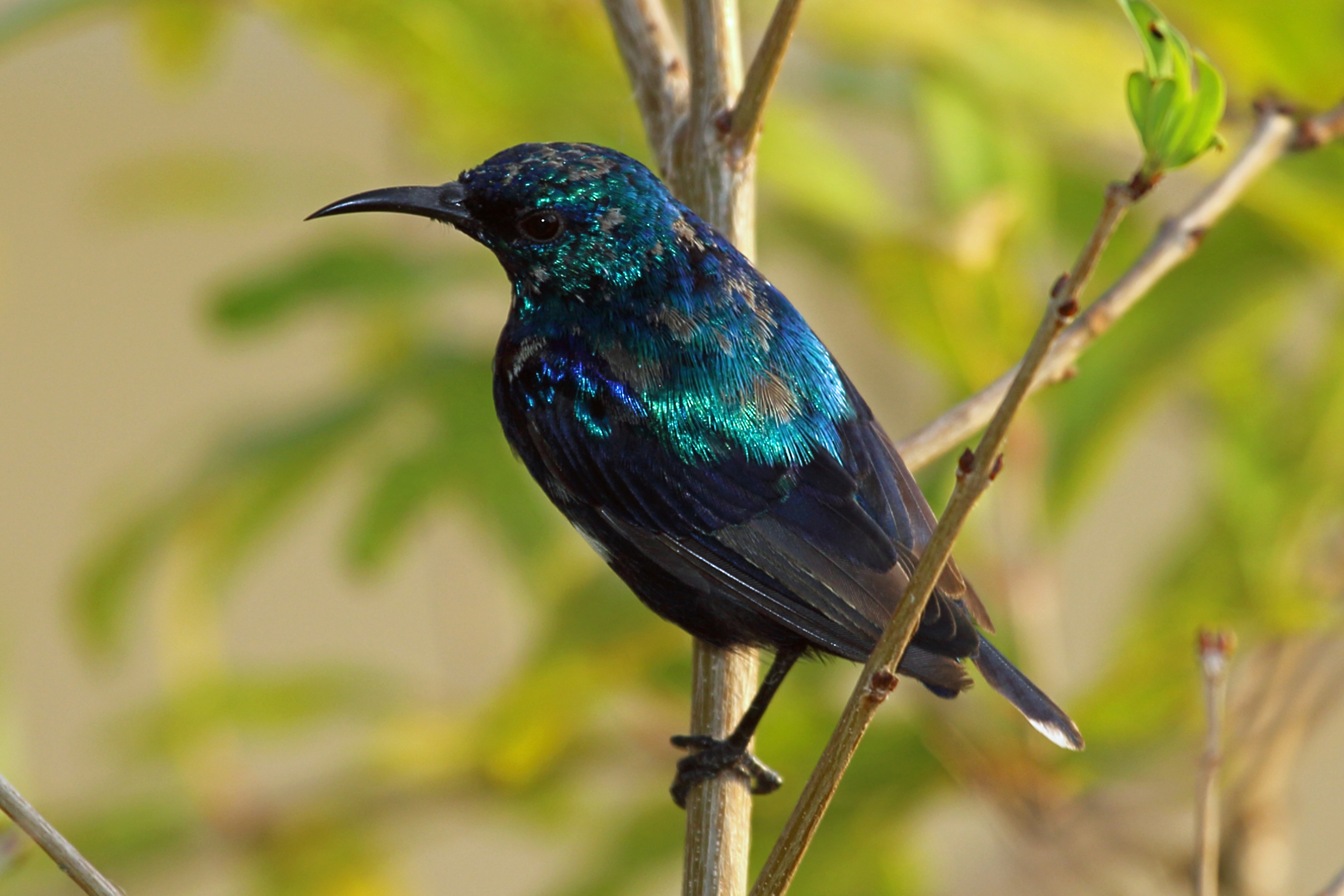
- Bird: Pemba sunbird

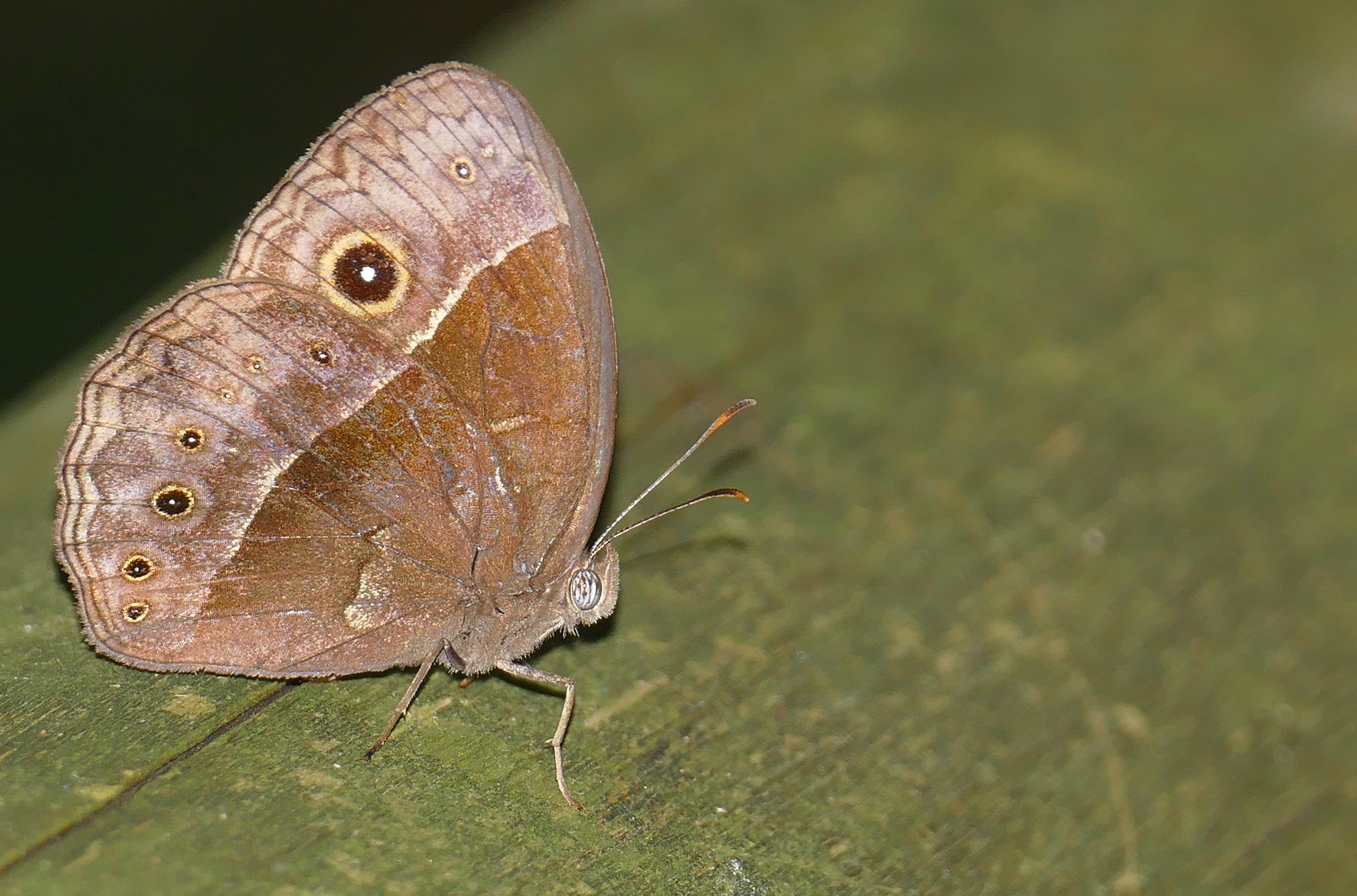
- Butterfly: Common bush brown

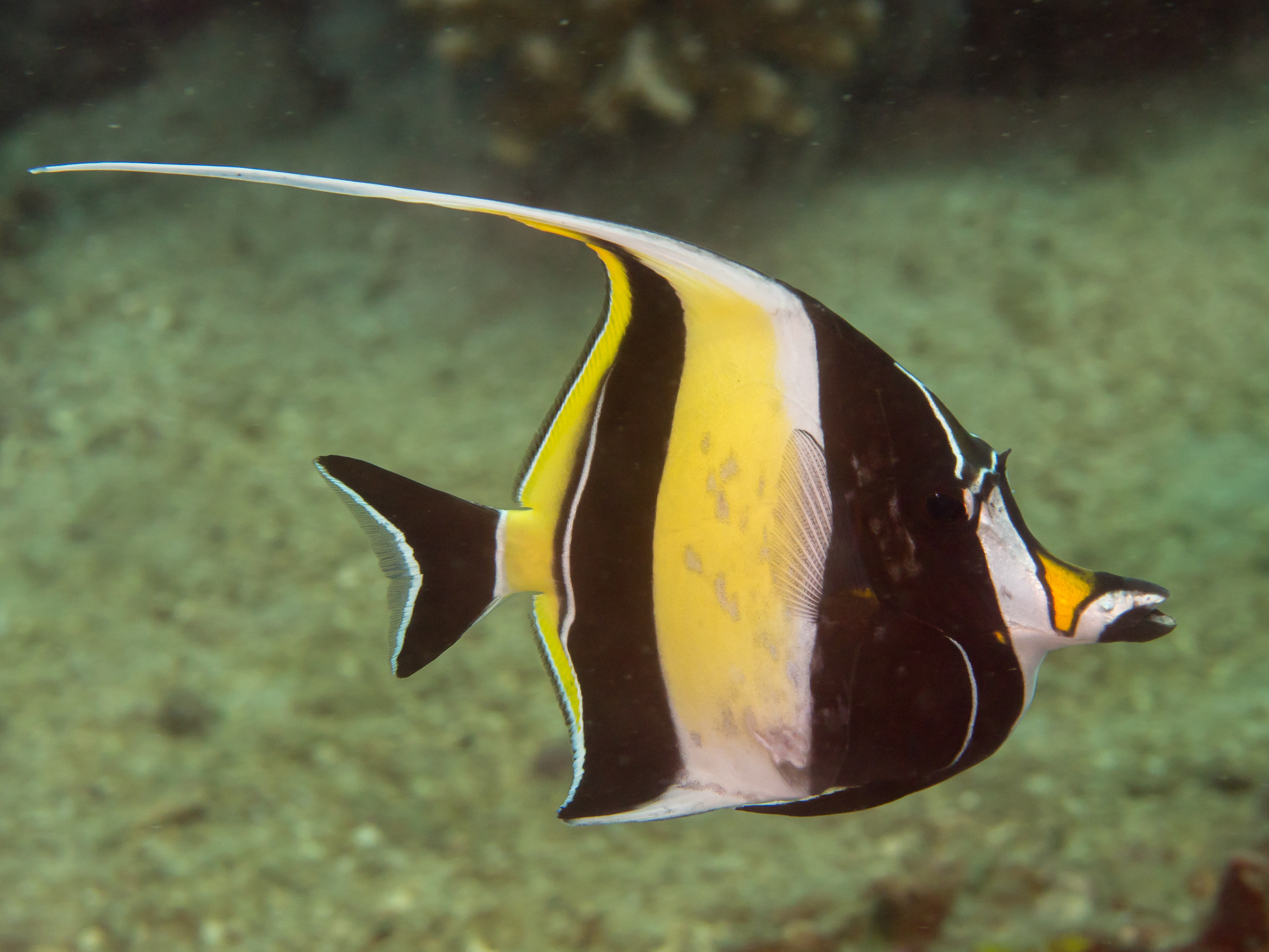
- Fish: Moorish idol

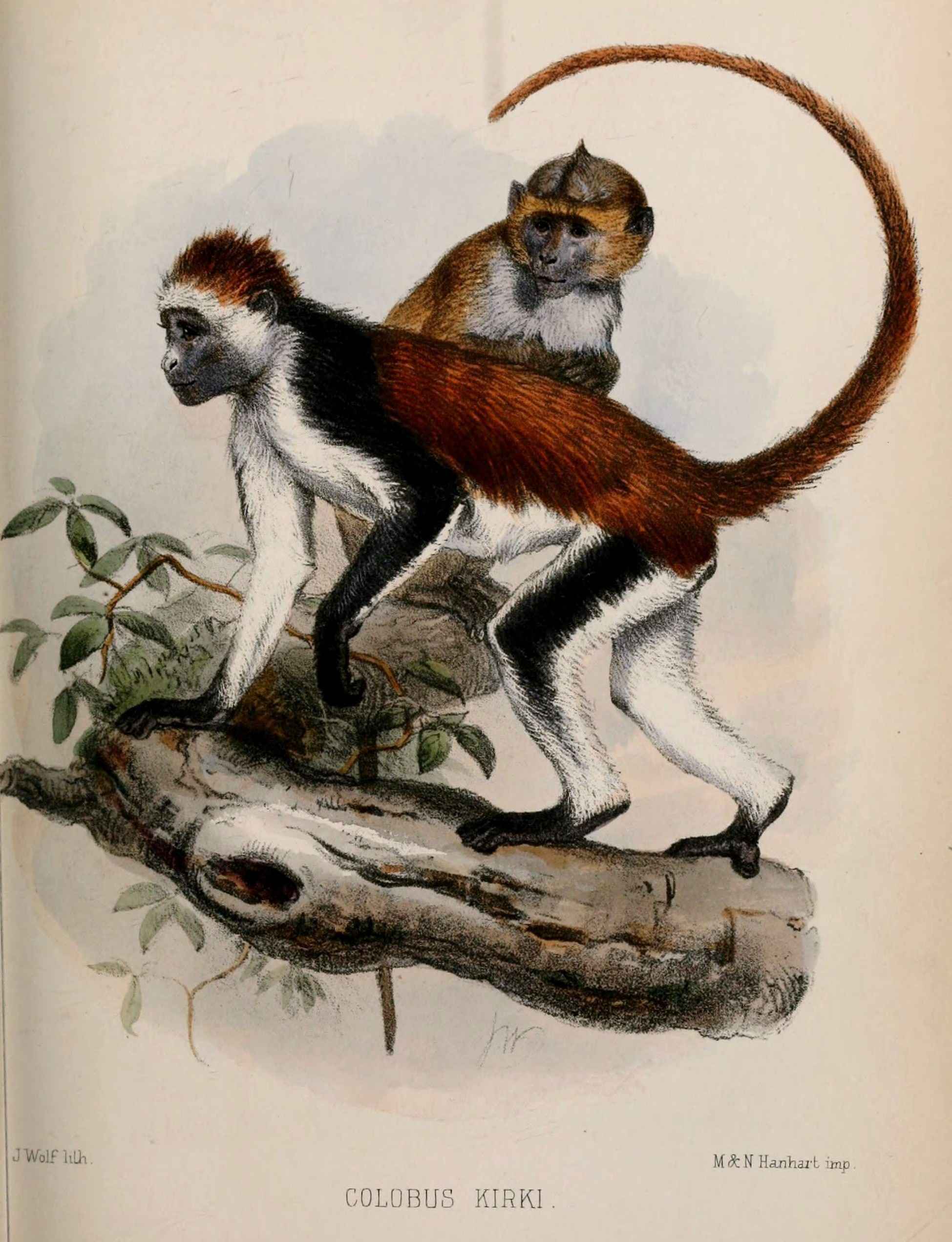
- Mammal: Zanzibar red colobus

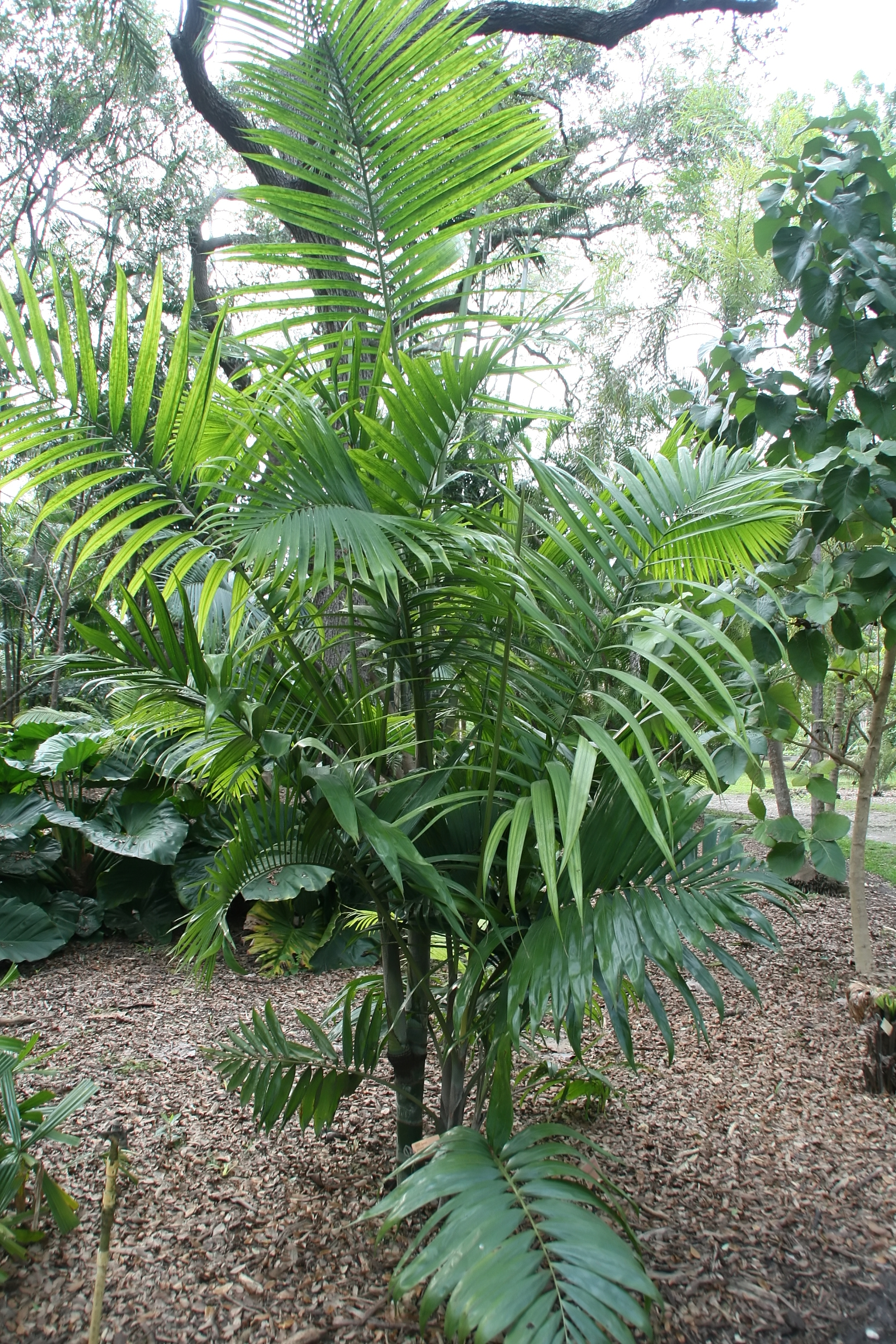
- Tree: Zanzibar palm

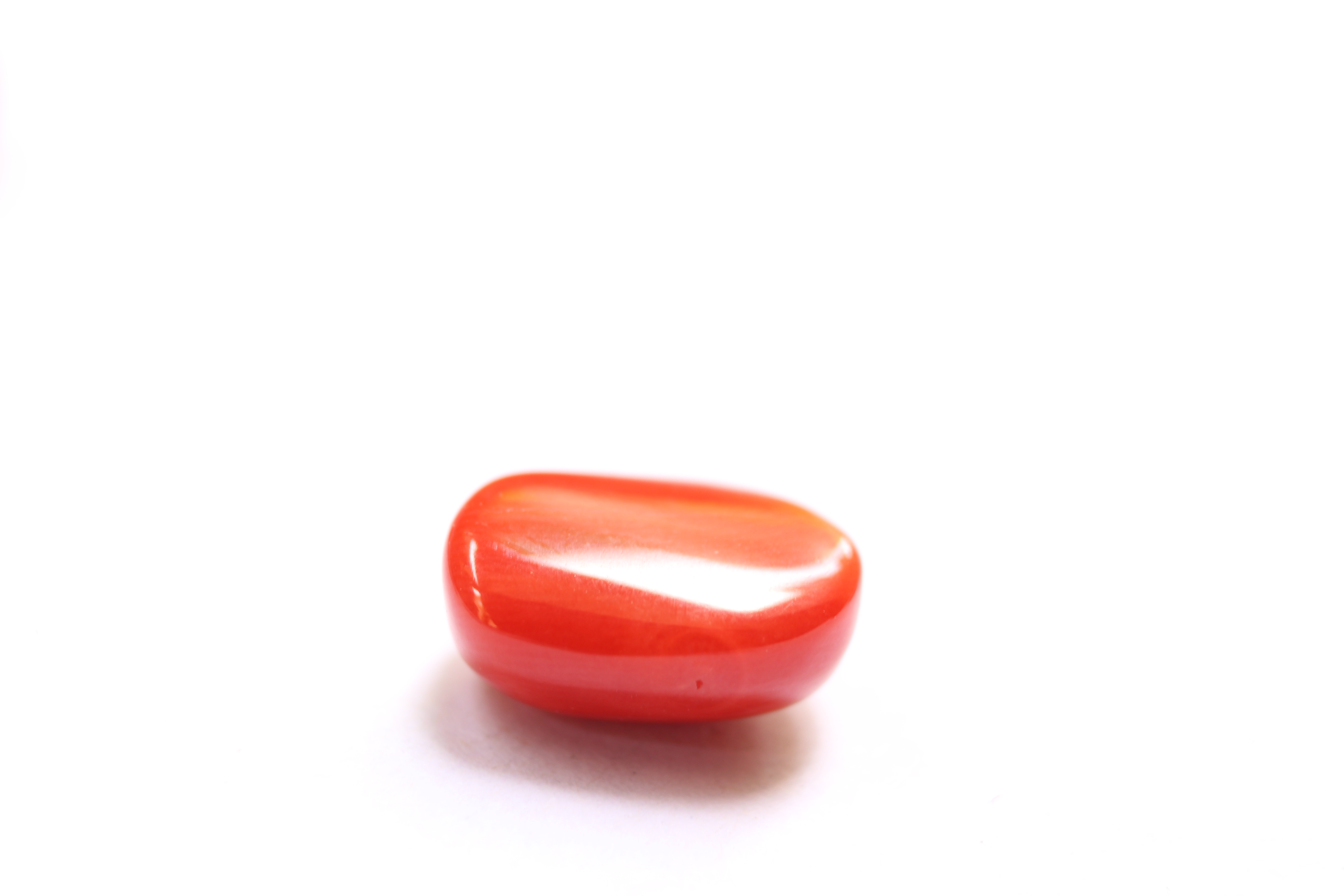
- Mineral: Coral

Mjini Magharibi Region, Zanzibar Urban West Region or West Zanzibar Region (Swahili: Mkoa wa Mjini Magharibi) is one of the 31 regions of Tanzania. The region covers an area of 230 km^{2} (89 sq mi). The region is located entirely on the island of Zanzibar and bordered to the west by the Indian Ocean, the north by Unguja North Region and the east by Unguja South Region. The region is home to one of the seven World Heritage Sites located in Tanzania, namely; Stonetown of Zanzibar. The regional capital is Zanzibar City. The region is the most developed region with the highest human development index in Tanzania at 0.718. According to the 2012 census, the region has a total population of 593,678.

== Administrative divisions ==
=== Districts ===
Mjini Magharibi Region is divided into two districts, each administered by a council:

Districts of Mjini Magharibi Region
Map	District	Population (2012)
	Magharibi	370,645
	Mjini	223,033
	Total	593,678

=== Constituencies ===
For parliamentary elections, Tanzania is divided into constituencies. As of the 2010 elections Zanzibar Urban/West Region had nineteen constituencies:

- Amani Constituency (Urban)
- Bububu Constituency (West)
- Chumbuni Constituency (Urban)
- Dimani Constituency (West)
- Dole Constituency (West)
- Fuoni Constituency (West)
- Jang'ombe Constituency (Urban)
- Kiembesamaki Constituency (West)
- Kikwajuni Constituency (Urban)
- Kwahani Constituency (Urban)
- Kwamtipura Constituency (Urban)
- Magogoni Constituency (West)
- Magomeni Constituency (Urban)
- Mfenesini Constituency (West)
- Mji Mkongwe Constituency (Urban)
- Mpendae Constituency (Urban)
- Mtoni Constituency (West)
- Mwanakwerekwe Constituency (West)
- Raha Leo Constituency (Urban)

== Notable people ==
- Siti binti Saad, musician
