= Zanzibar City =

District of Mjini Magharibi Region, Tanzania

Zanzibar City Jiji la Zanzibar (Swahili)
- District & Port city of Mjini Mashariki Region
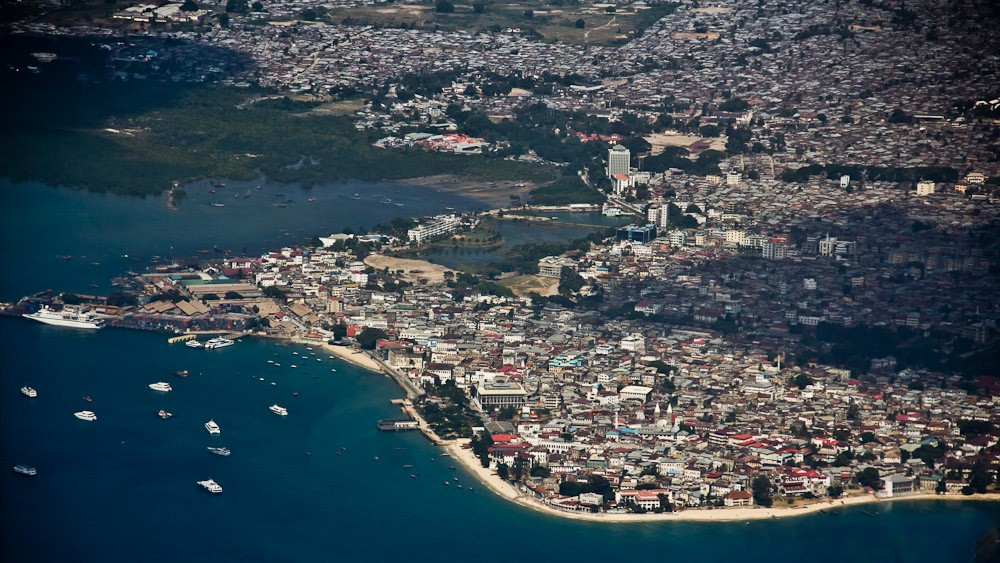
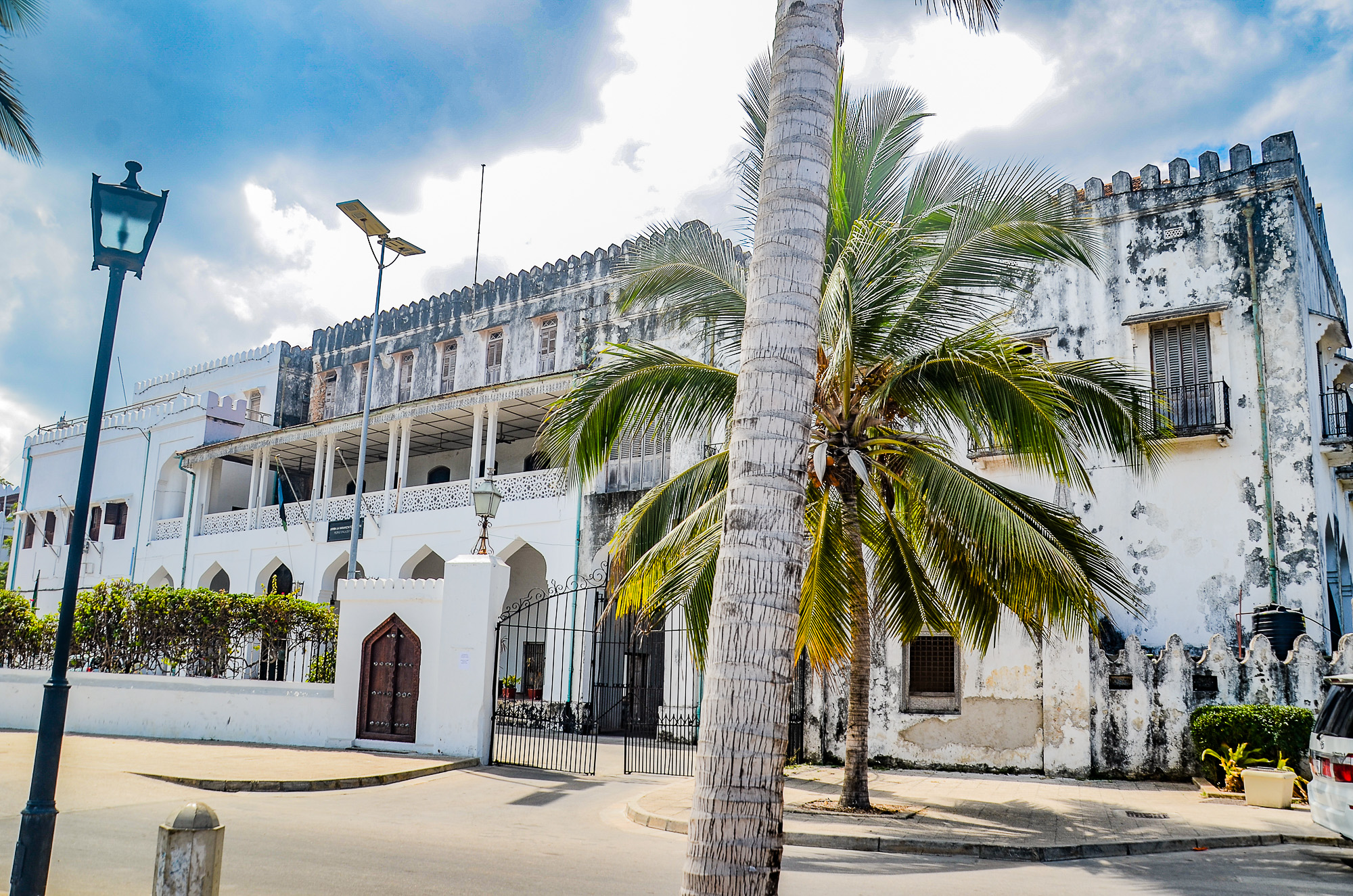
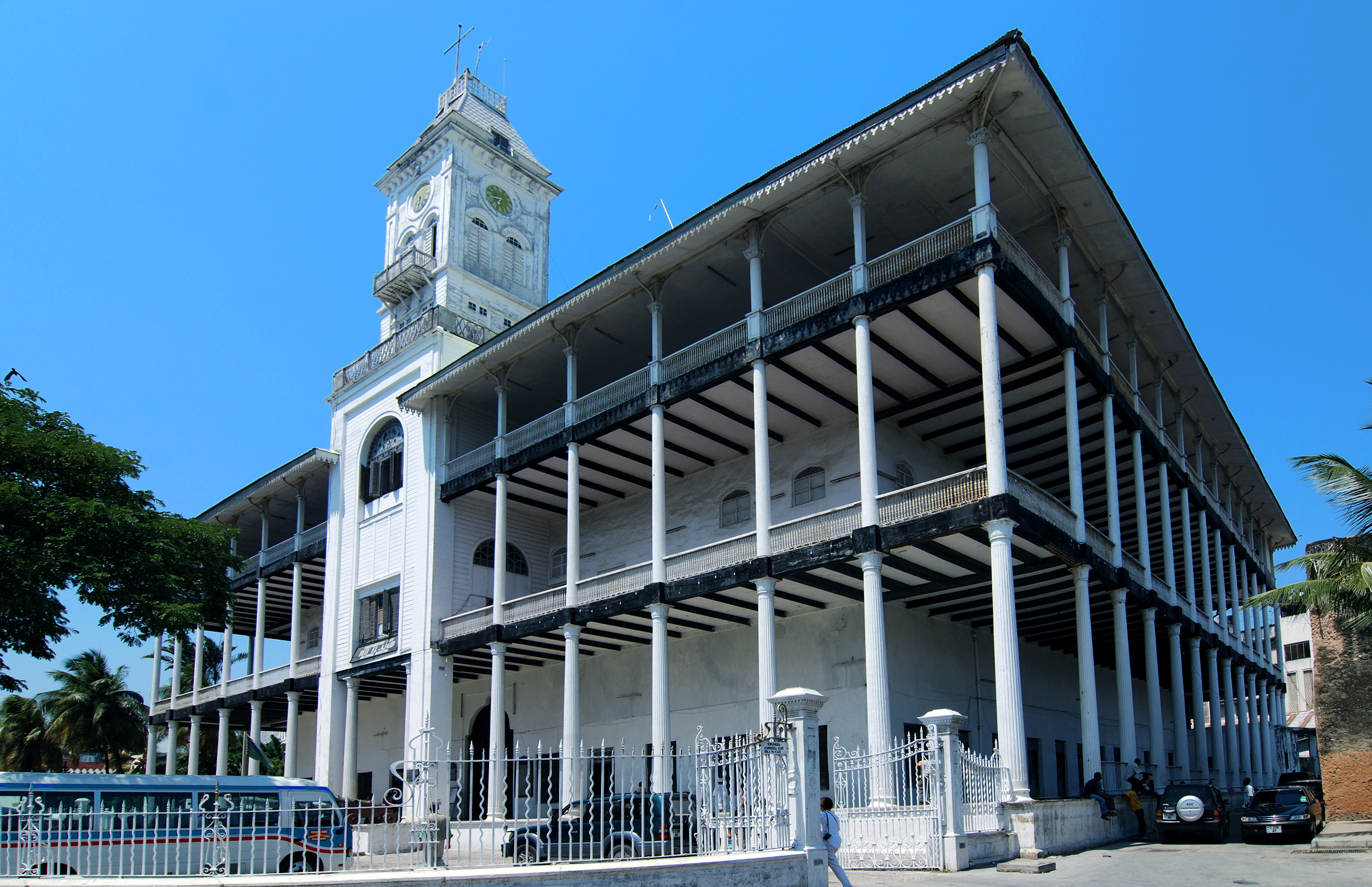
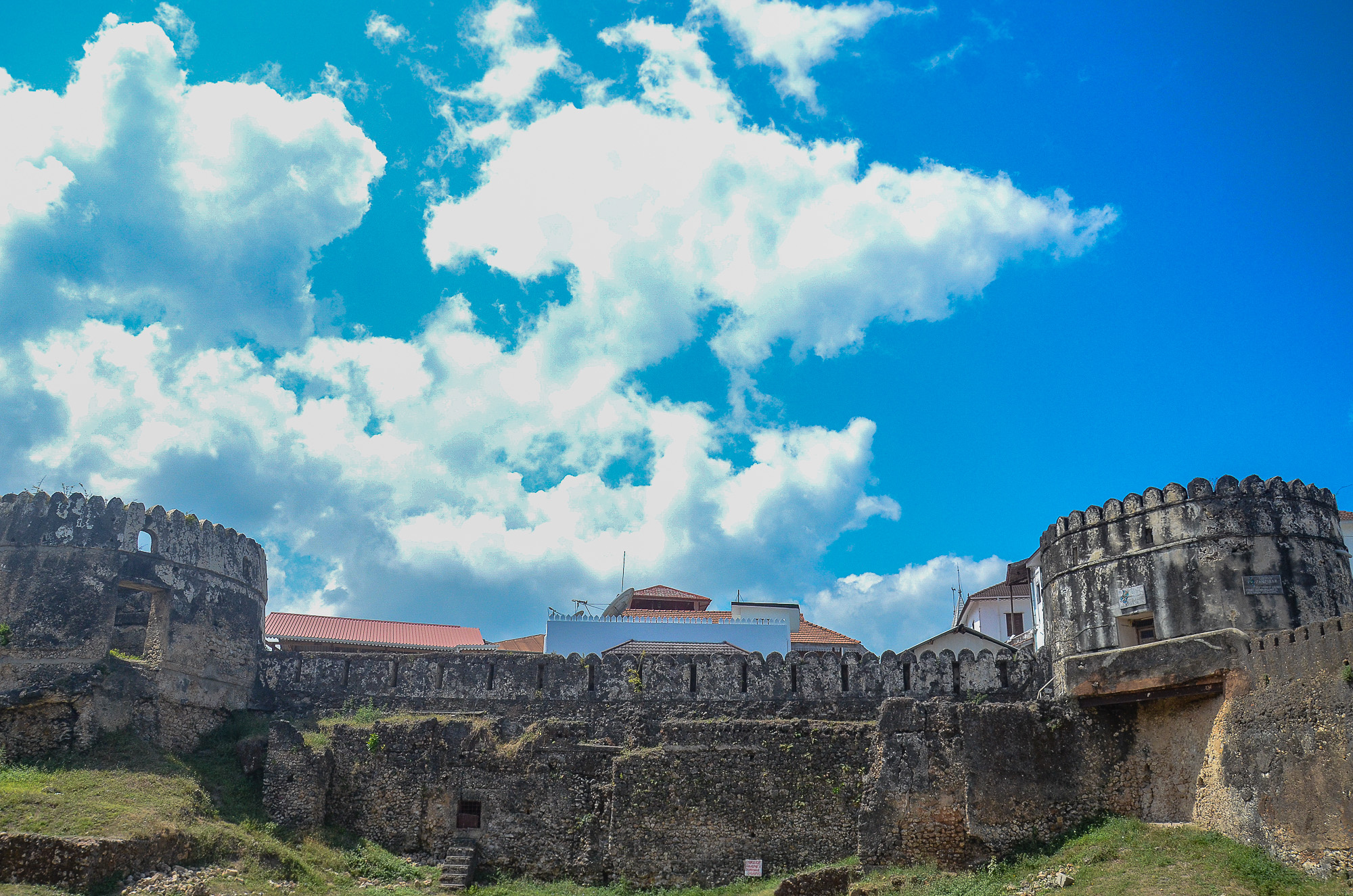
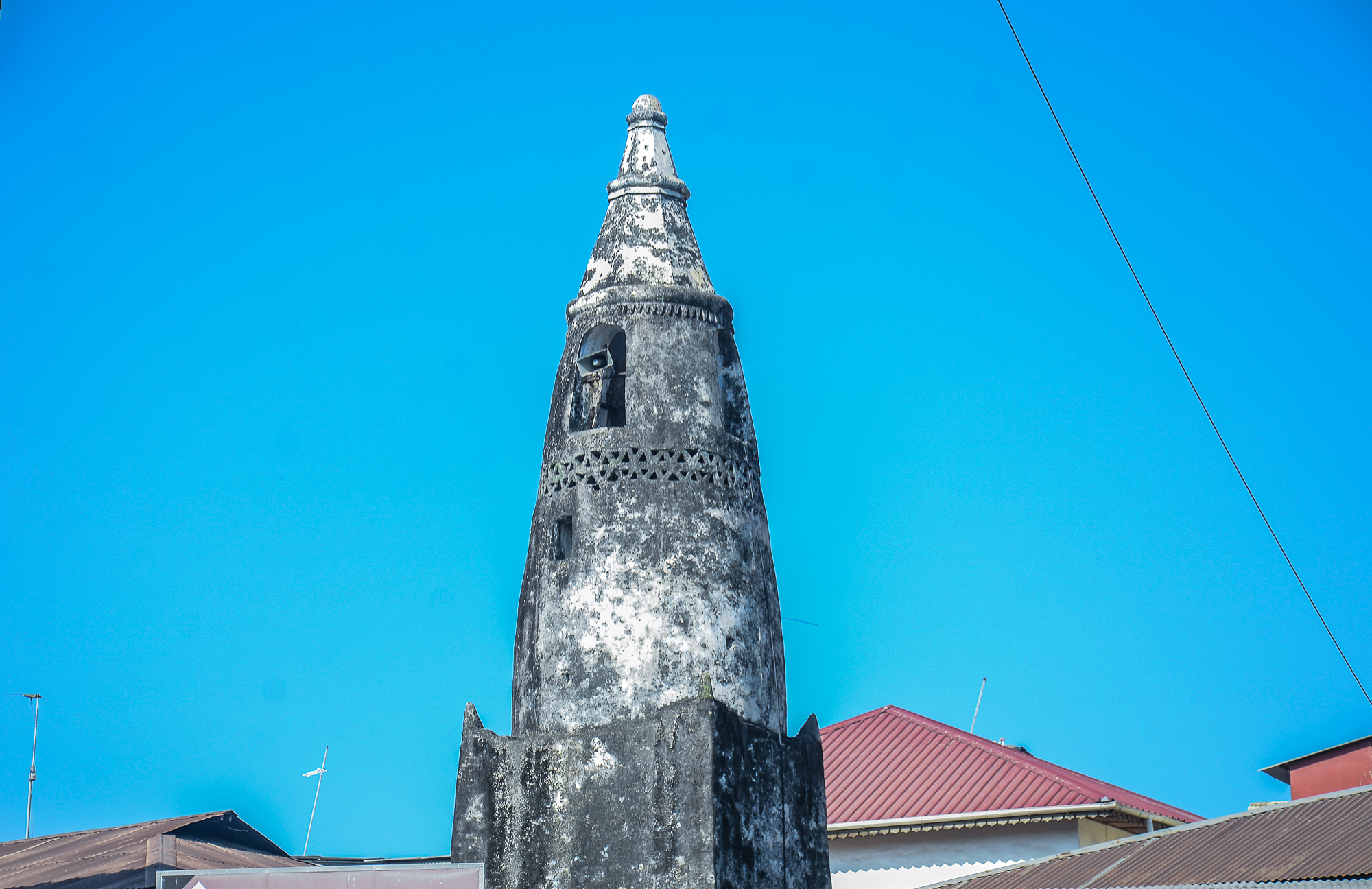
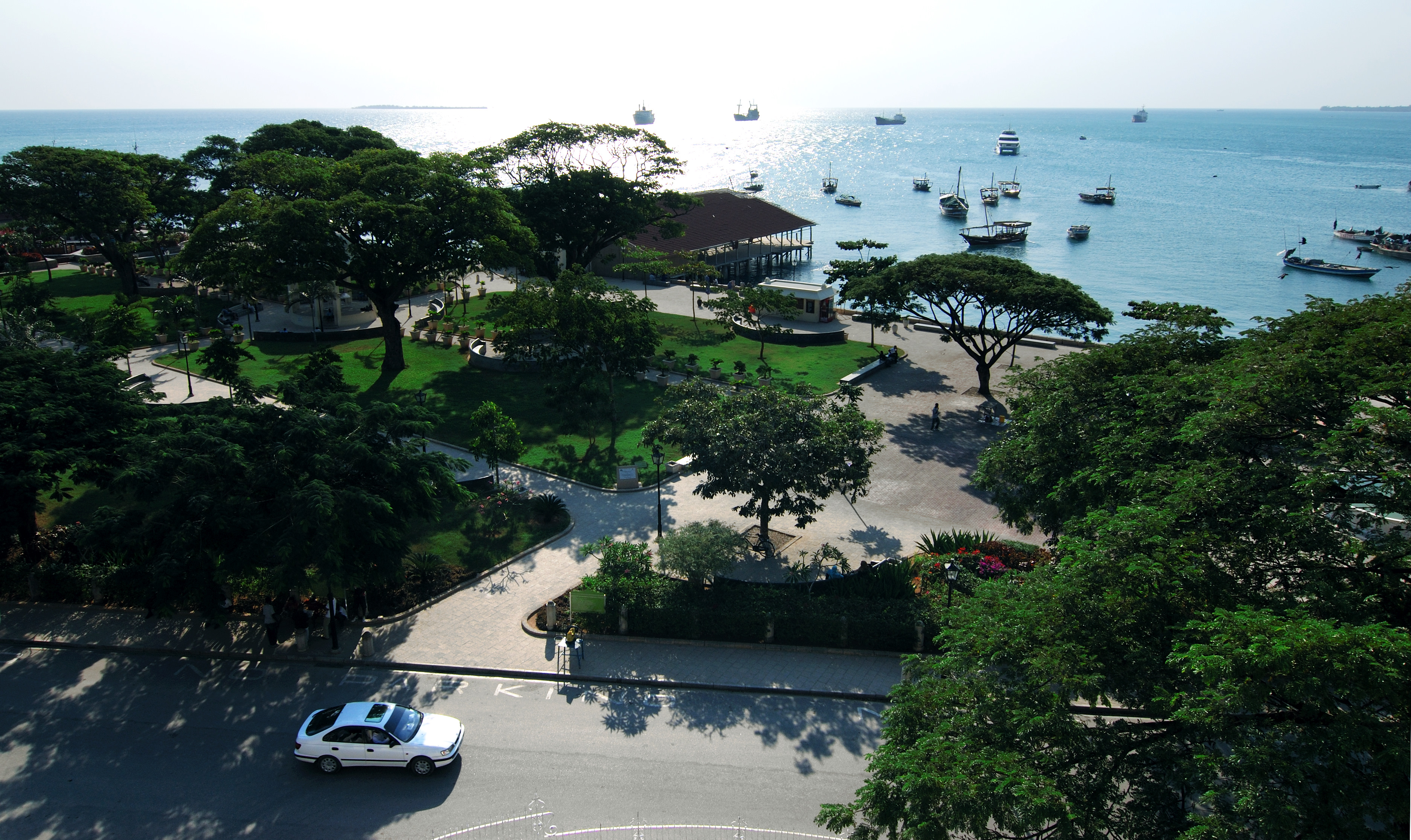
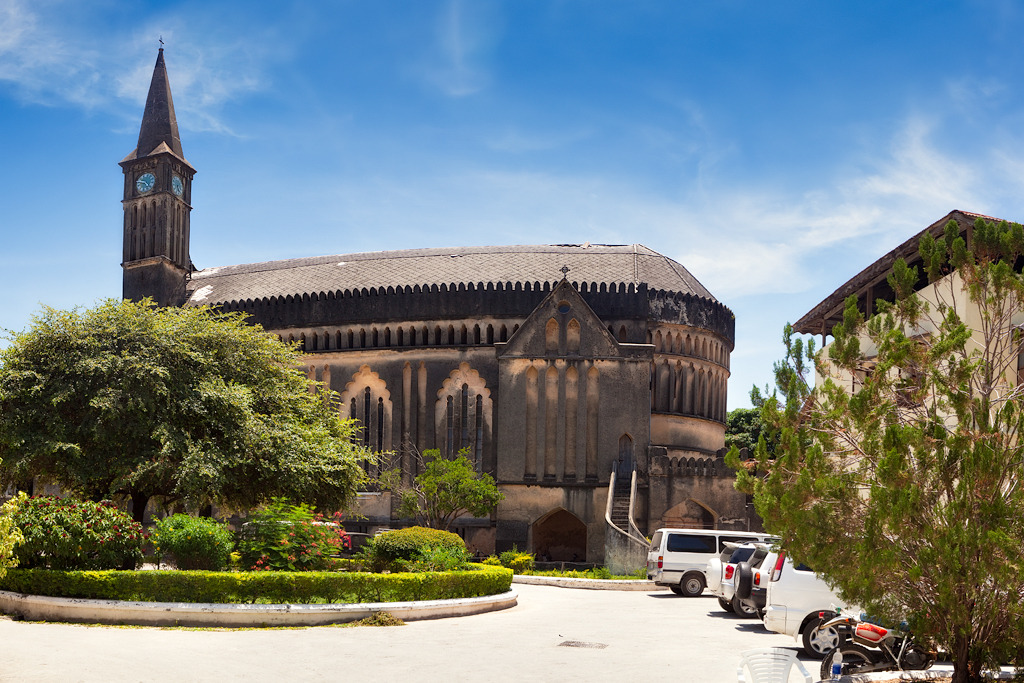
- Aerial view of Stone Town Sultan's Palace Museum House of Wonders Old Fort Malindi Mosque Minaret Forodhani Gardens Christ Church
- Nickname: Home of Stonetown
- Location in Mjini Magharibi Region
- Coordinates: 6.165°S 39.199°E
- Country: Tanzania
- Region: Mjini Magharibi Region
- Capital: Stonetown

Government
  - Type: Municipal
  - Mayor: Khatib Abdulrahman Khatib

Area
  - Total: 15.4 km^{2} (5.9 sq mi)
  - Rank: 2nd in Mjini Magharibi

Population (2022)
  - Total: 219,007
  - Rank: 2nd in Mjini Maharibi
  - Density: 14,200/km^{2} (36,800/sq mi)
- Demonym: Wamjini

Ethnic groups
  - Settler: Swahili & Arabs
  - Native: Hadimu
- Climate: Aw

Zanzibar City or Mjini District, often simply referred to as Zanzibar (Wilaya ya Zanzibar Mjini or Jiji la Zanzibar in Swahili), is one of two administrative districts of Mjini Magharibi Region in Tanzania. The district covers an area of 15.4 km^{2} (5.9 sq mi). The district has a water border to the west by the Indian Ocean. The district is bordered to the east by Magharibi District. The district seat is in Stonetown. The city is the largest on the island of Zanzibar. It is located on the west coast of Unguja, the main island of the Zanzibar Archipelago, north of the much larger city of Dar es Salaam across the Zanzibar Channel. The city also serves as the capital of the Zanzibar Urban/West Region. In 2022 its population was 219,007.

Zanzibar City comprises two main parts, Stone Town and Ng'ambo (literally: "The Other Side"); the two areas were historically divided by a creek since filled in, with the street on the Stone Town side of the creek originally called Creek Road but later renamed to Benjamin Mkapa Road. Stone Town is the historical core of the city, the former capital of the Zanzibar Sultanate; because of its unique architecture and culture, it was declared a UNESCO World Heritage Site in 2000. Ng'ambo is a much larger, modern area that developed around Stone Town after the Zanzibar Revolution, with office buildings and large apartment blocks such as those of the Michenzani neighbourhood. Zanzibar City is served by a number of international and domestic airlines via Abeid Amani Karume International Airport.

== History ==
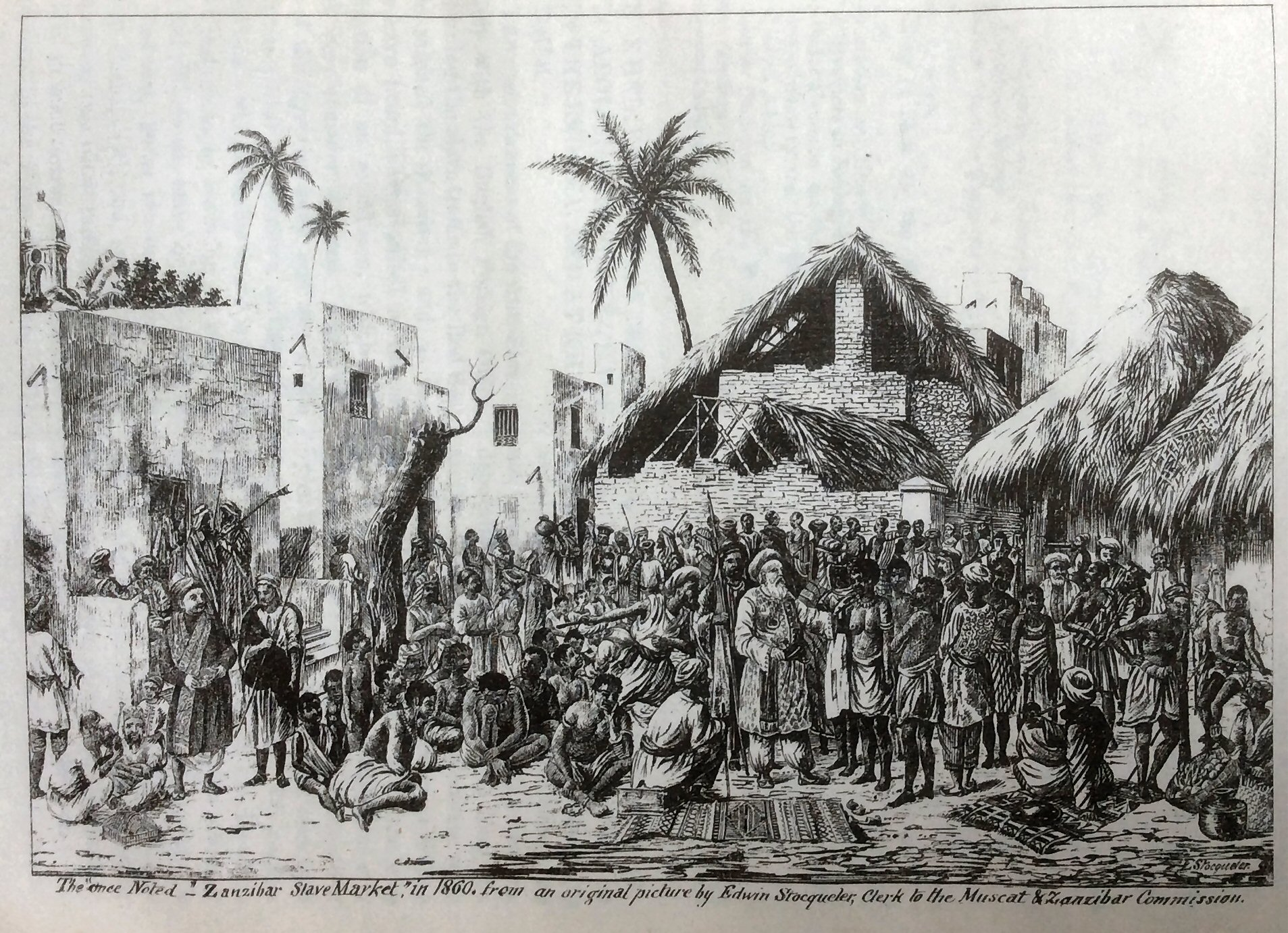
Slave market in Zanzibar city in 1860

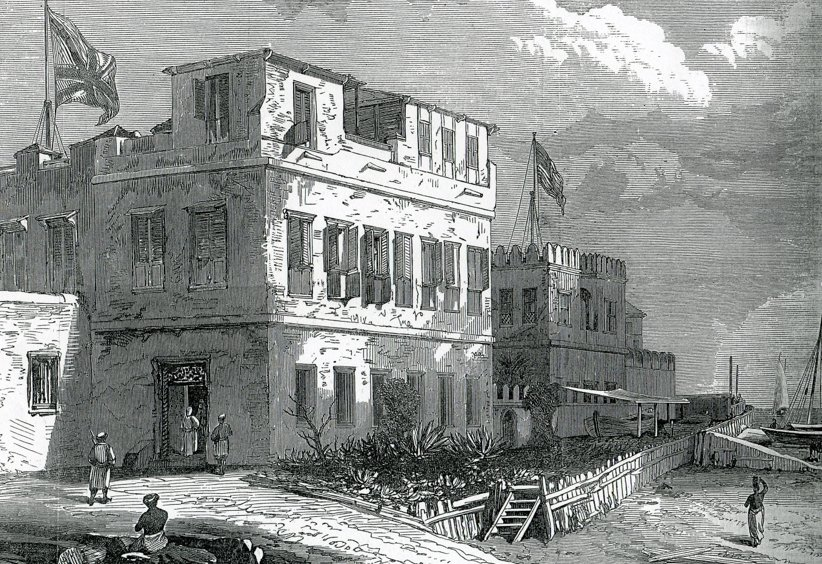
British Agency Building, 1872

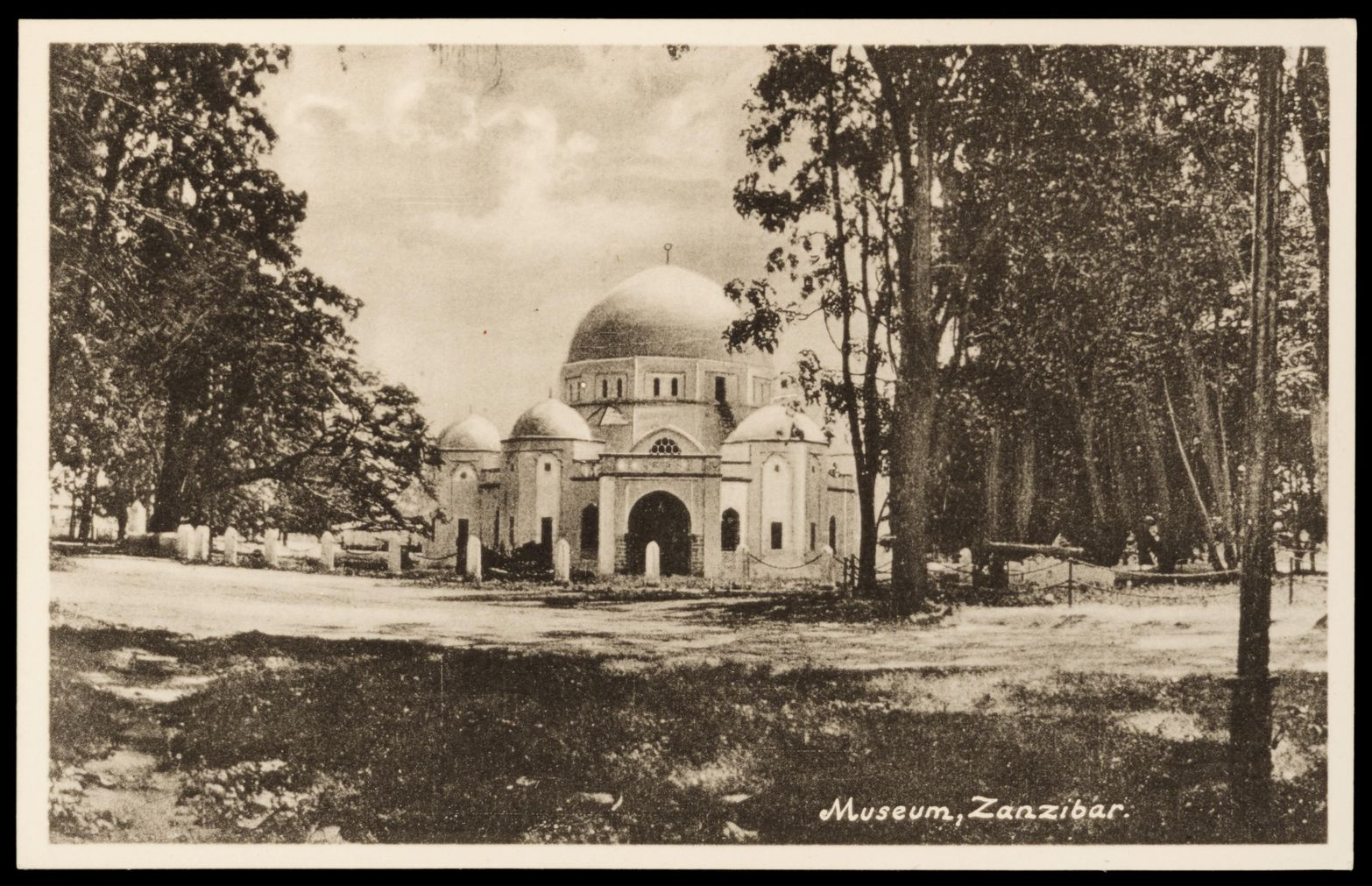
Zanzibar museum, 1890.

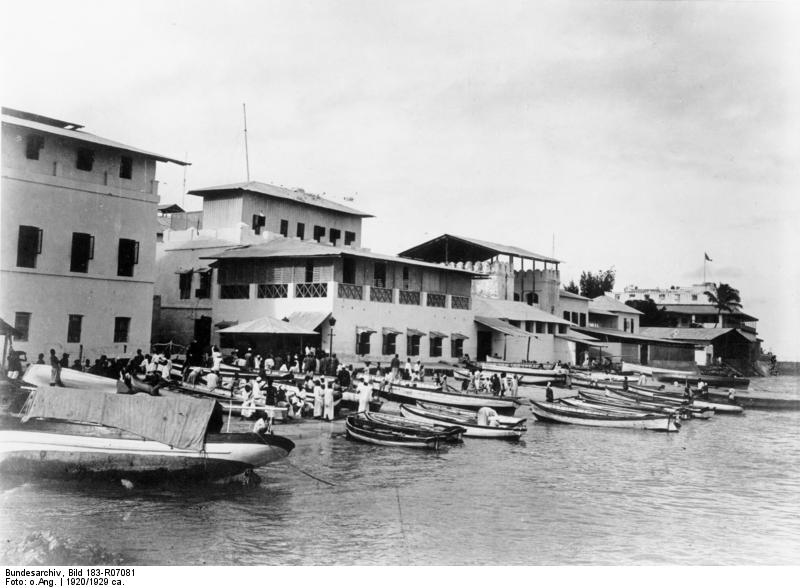
Zanzibar in 1920

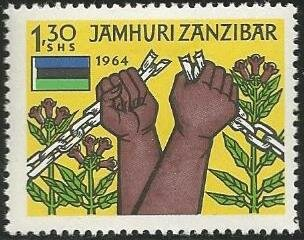
Zanzibar freedom stamp 1964

In 1592, the first English ship arrived in port. In 1824, Said bin Sultan, Sultan of Muscat and Oman established the capital of his kingdom in the city. The city was a high place of slavery, one of the main ports of East Africa for the slave trade. The famous slave trader Tippu Tip lived there. In 1846, the island had 360,000 enslaved for 450,000 inhabitants. In 1866, the British explorer David Livingstone (1813–1873) stayed in Zanzibar to prepare his last expedition to Tanzania. In 1892, Zanzibar was declared a free port.

== Coordinates ==
The coordinates for Zanzibar City are 6 degrees south, and 39 degrees East. The exact coordinates are

Latitude	6.165917° S
Longitude	39.202641° E

== Climate ==
Zanzibar City has a tropical climate, very similar to whole Unguja island, and slightly hotter than what is found in Pemba. This climate is classified as a tropical monsoon climate (Köppen climate classification Am). The average temperature in Zanzibar City is 26.9 °C (80.4 °F). The average annual rainfall is 1,512 mm (59.5 in). The monthly average temperatures are usually between 25.1 and 28.8 °C (77.2 and 83.8 °F). There are two rain seasons, with most rainfall coming between March and May and smaller rain season coming between November and December. Drier months are January - February, and a longer drier season between June and October.

Climate data for Zanzibar City (1991–2020)
Month	Jan	Feb	Mar	Apr	May	Jun	Jul	Aug	Sep	Oct	Nov	Dec	Year
Mean daily maximum °C (°F)	32.6 (90.7)	33.2 (91.8)	32.5 (90.5)	30.6 (87.1)	29.7 (85.5)	29.3 (84.7)	29.0 (84.2)	29.4 (84.9)	30.4 (86.7)	31.2 (88.2)	31.0 (87.8)	31.8 (89.2)	30.9 (87.6)
Daily mean °C (°F)	28.5 (83.3)	28.5 (83.3)	28.4 (83.1)	27.4 (81.3)	26.6 (79.9)	25.9 (78.6)	25.3 (77.5)	25.2 (77.4)	25.7 (78.3)	26.5 (79.7)	27.1 (80.8)	28.0 (82.4)	26.9 (80.5)
Mean daily minimum °C (°F)	24.5 (76.1)	24.3 (75.7)	24.5 (76.1)	24.5 (76.1)	23.8 (74.8)	22.9 (73.2)	22.1 (71.8)	21.1 (70.0)	21.0 (69.8)	22.0 (71.6)	23.1 (73.6)	24.0 (75.2)	23.1 (73.6)
Average precipitation mm (inches)	73.6 (2.90)	50.8 (2.00)	176.9 (6.96)	408.5 (16.08)	297.8 (11.72)	51.9 (2.04)	30.8 (1.21)	37.7 (1.48)	36.8 (1.45)	115.7 (4.56)	201.3 (7.93)	167.7 (6.60)	1,649.5 (64.94)
Average precipitation days (≥ 1.0 mm)	5.6	3.6	11.0	17.5	13.8	5.3	4.3	6.0	5.1	6.9	13.7	12.2	105.0
Source 1: NOAA
Source 2: Tokyo Climate Center (mean temperatures 1991–2020)

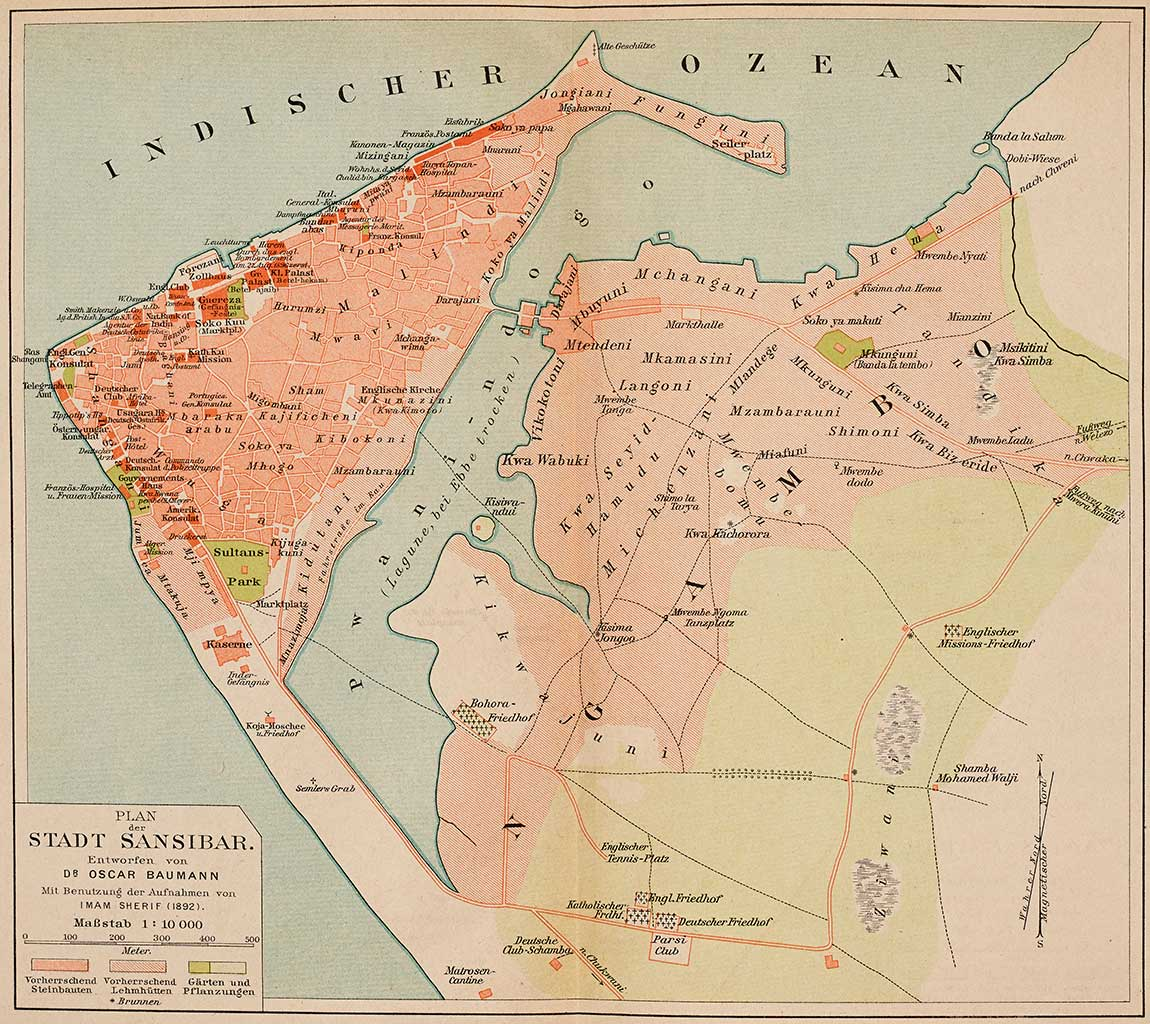
A map of Zanzibar City by Oscar Baumann, 1892.

== Places of worship ==
The places of worship in the city are predominantly Muslim mosques. There are also Christian churches and temples: Roman Catholic Diocese of Zanzibar (Catholic Church), Anglican Church of Tanzania (Anglican Communion), Evangelical Lutheran Church in Tanzania (Lutheran World Federation), Baptist Convention of Tanzania (Baptist World Alliance), Assemblies of God.

== Constituencies ==
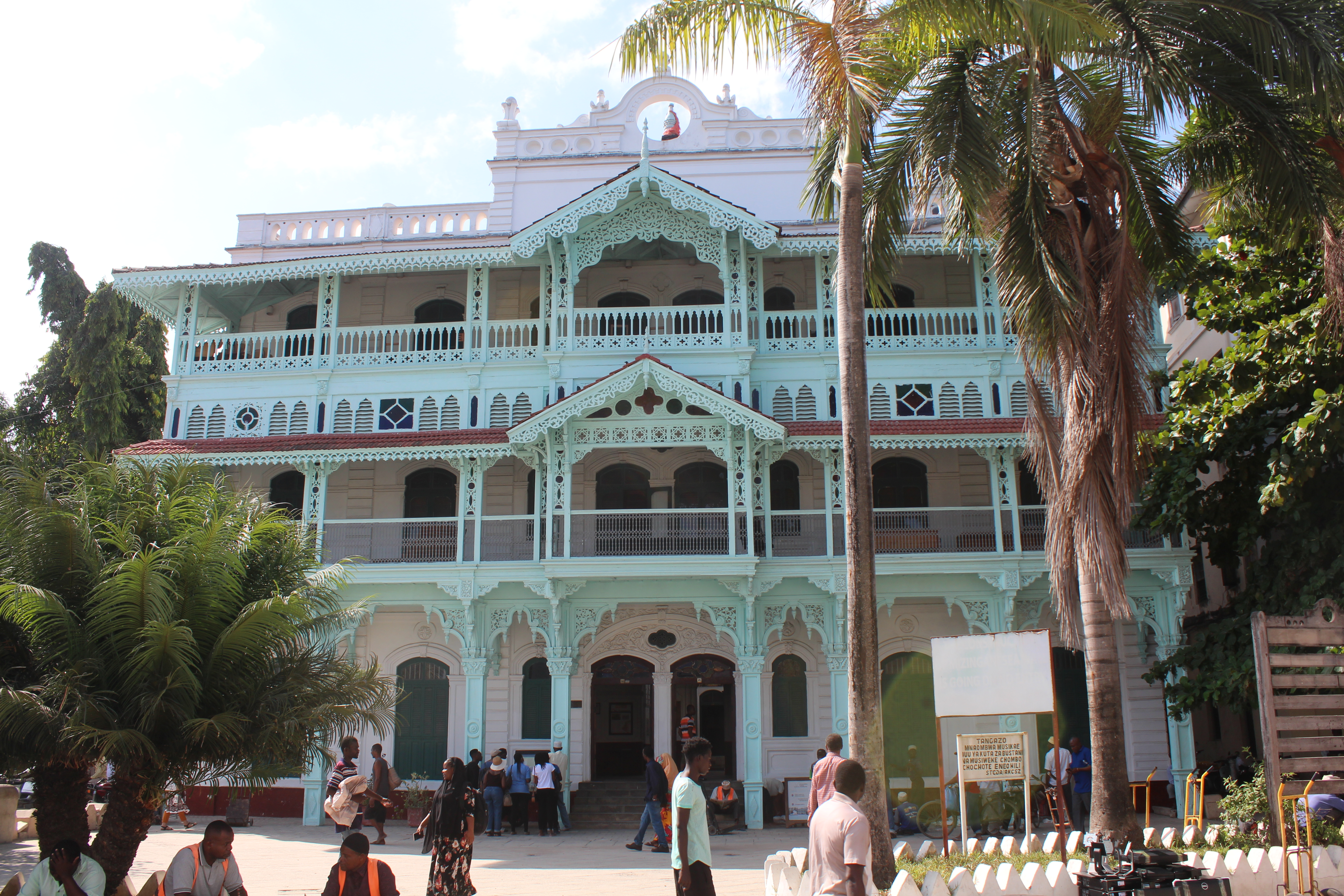
Old Dispensary, Stone Town

For parliamentary elections, Tanzania is divided into constituencies. As of the 2010 elections the area for Zanzibar City District had ten of the nineteen constituencies in the region:

- Amani Constituency
- Chumbuni Constituency
- Jangombe Constituency
- Kikwajuni Constituency
- Kwahani Constituency
- Kwamtipura Constituency
- Magomeni Constituency
- Mji Mkongwe Constituency
- Mpendae Constituency
- Rahaleo Constituency

== Wards ==
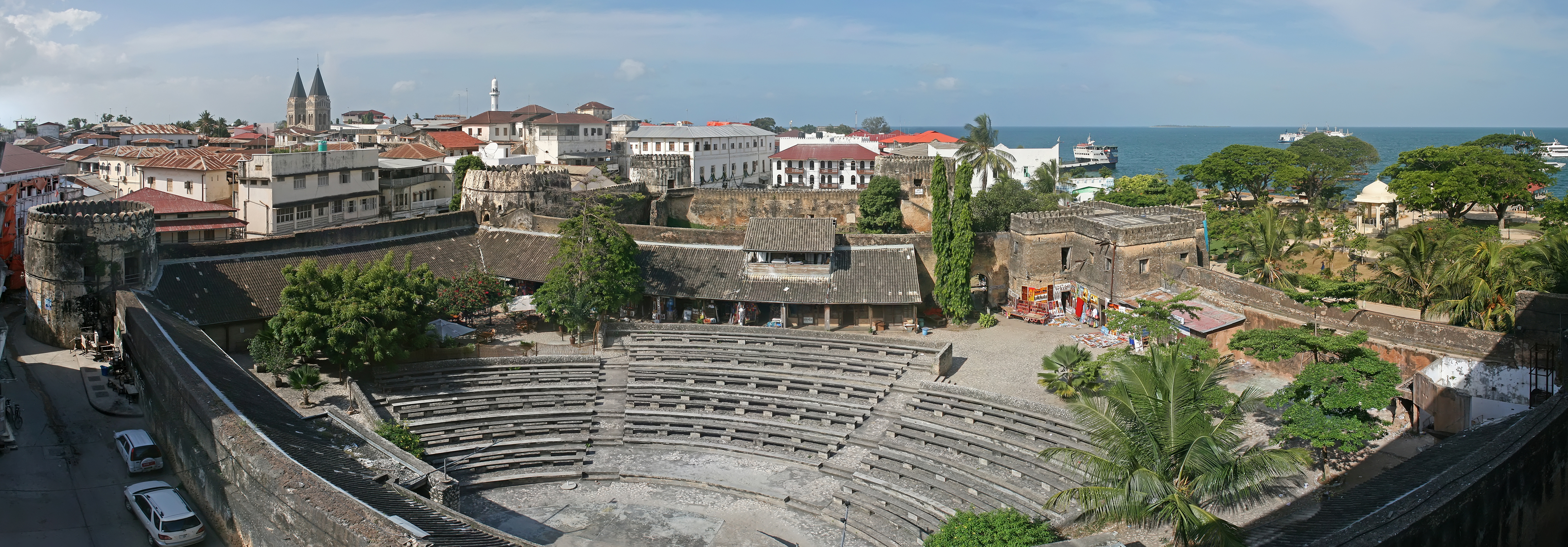
Old Fort in Zanzibar City

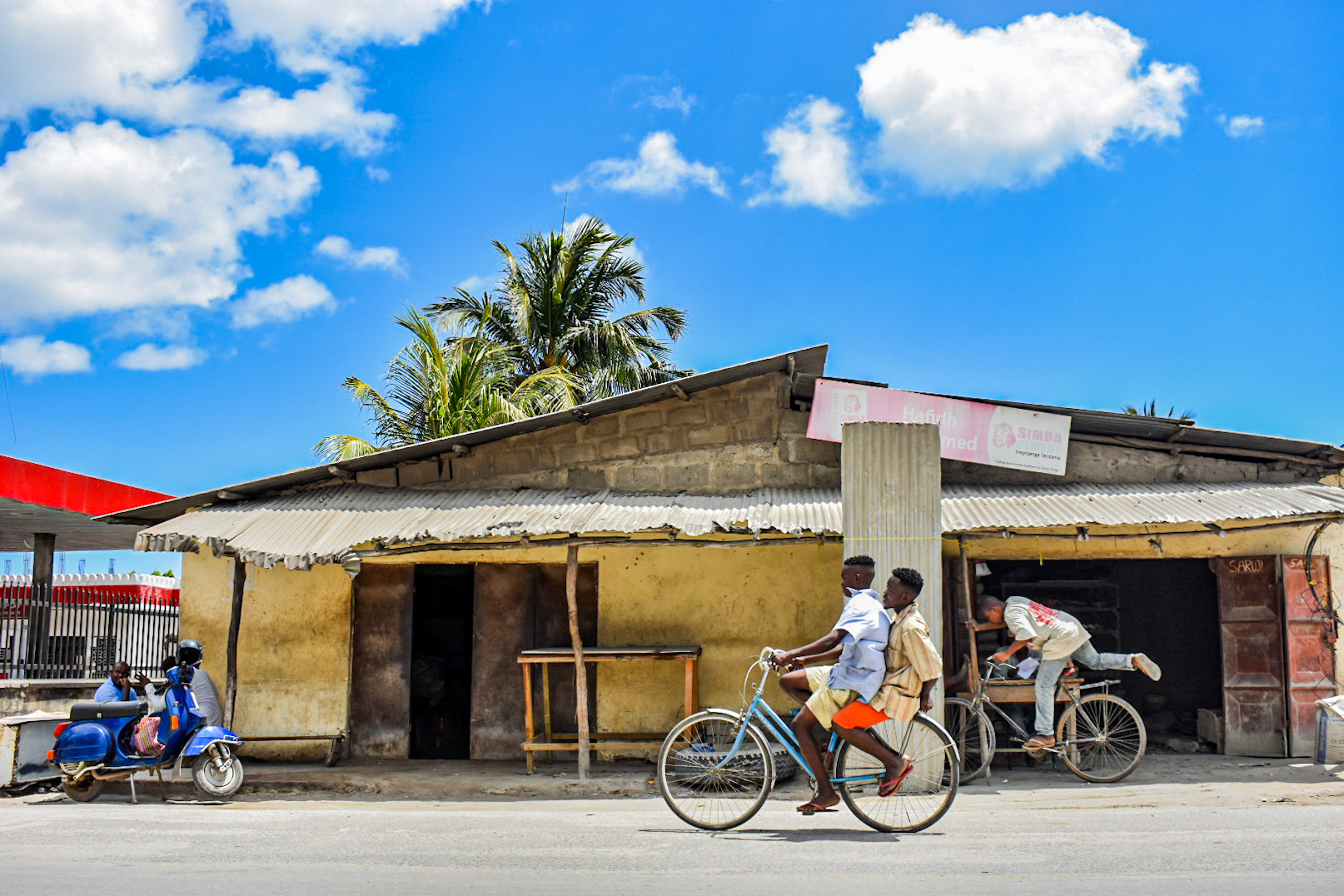
Children playing in Zanzibar city

The Zanzibar Urban District is administratively divided into 45 wards:

Nr.	Ward (Shehia)	Population 2012	Parliamentary Constituency
1	Shangani	3,886	Mji Kongwe
2	Mkunazini	3,308	Mji Kongwe
3	Kiponda	1,654	Mji Kongwe
4	Malindi	3,204	Mji Kongwe
5	Mchangani	2,211	Mji Kongwe
6	Vikokotoni	1,872	Mji Kongwe
7	Mwembetanga	2,610	Mji Kongwe
8	Kisiwandui	1,590	Kikwajuni
9	Kikwajuni Juu	2,408	Kikwajuni
10	Kikwajuni Bondeni	2,257	Kikwajuni
11	Kisima Majongoo	2,615	Kikwajuni
12	Miembeni	6,095	Kikwajuni
13	Kilimani	2,911	Kikwajuni
14	Migombani	7,164	Mpendae
15	Mpendae	13,252	Mpendae
16	Meya	5,777	Mpendae
17	Jang'ombe	6,122	Jang'ombe
18	Urusi	7,532	Jang'ombe
19	Matarumbeta	2,711	Jang'ombe
20	Kwaalinato	5,438	Jang'ombe
21	Mwembeshauri	1,933	Rahaleo
22	Rahaleo	1,950	Rahaleo
23	Mlandege	2,070	Rahaleo
24	Muembe Ladu	2,954	Rahaleo
25	Gulioni	2,488	Rahaleo
26	Makadara	5,048	Rahaleo
27	Kwaalamsha	3,479	Kwahani
28	Mikunguni	2,984	Kwahani
29	Kwahani	4,815	Kwahani
30	Kidongo Chekundu	2,290	Kwahani
31	Muungano	5,304	Kwahani
32	Sogea	4,801	Magomeni
33	Magomeni	6,165	Magomeni
34	Nyerere	9,657	Magomeni
35	Kwa Wazee	6,454	Magomeni
36	Sebleni	5,102	Amaani
37	Amaani	6,156	Amaani
38	Kilimahewa Bondeni	5,116	Amaani
39	Kilimahewa Juu	4,714	Amaani
40	Kwamtipura	11,572	Kwamtipura
41	Mkele	7,140	Kwamtipura
42	Shaurimoyo	8,335	Kwamtipura
43	Chumbuni	10,925	Chumbuni
44	Karakana	8,610	Chumbuni
45	Muembe Makumbi	8,354	Chumbuni
Total	Zanzibar Urban	223,033	

As of 2012, Mjini District was administratively divided into 20 wards.

=== Wards ===
1. Amani
2. Chumbuni
3. Jang'ombe
4. Kikwajuni
5. Kilimahewa
6. Kwaalinathoo
7. Kwahani
8. Kwamtipura
9. Magomeni
1. Makadara
2. Mchangani
3. Meya
4. Miembeni
5. Mkele
6. Mkunazini
7. Mpandae
8. Muungano
9. Mwembe Makumbi
10. Nyerere
11. Rahaleo

== Demographics ==
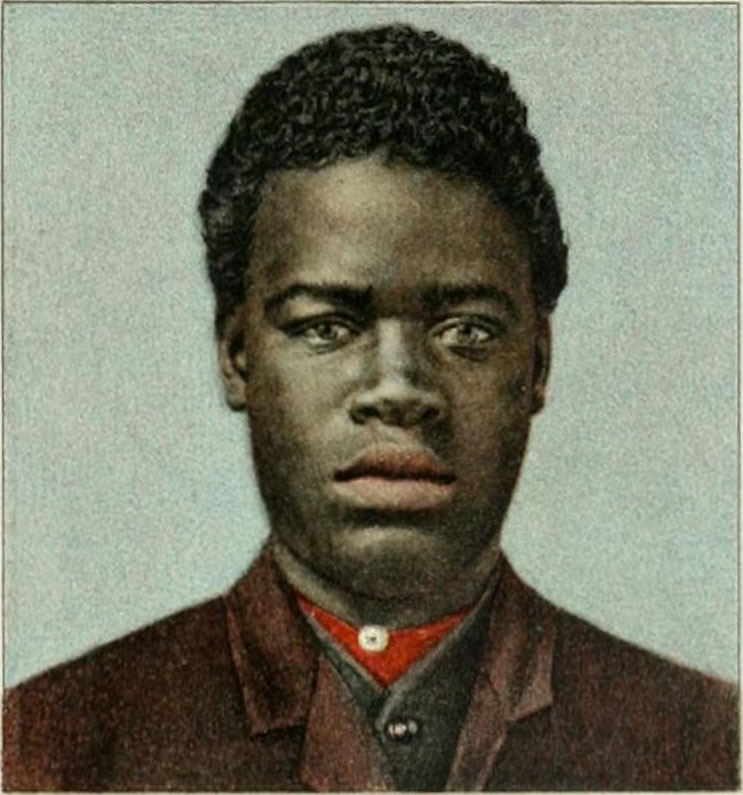
Zanzibari Man, 1905.

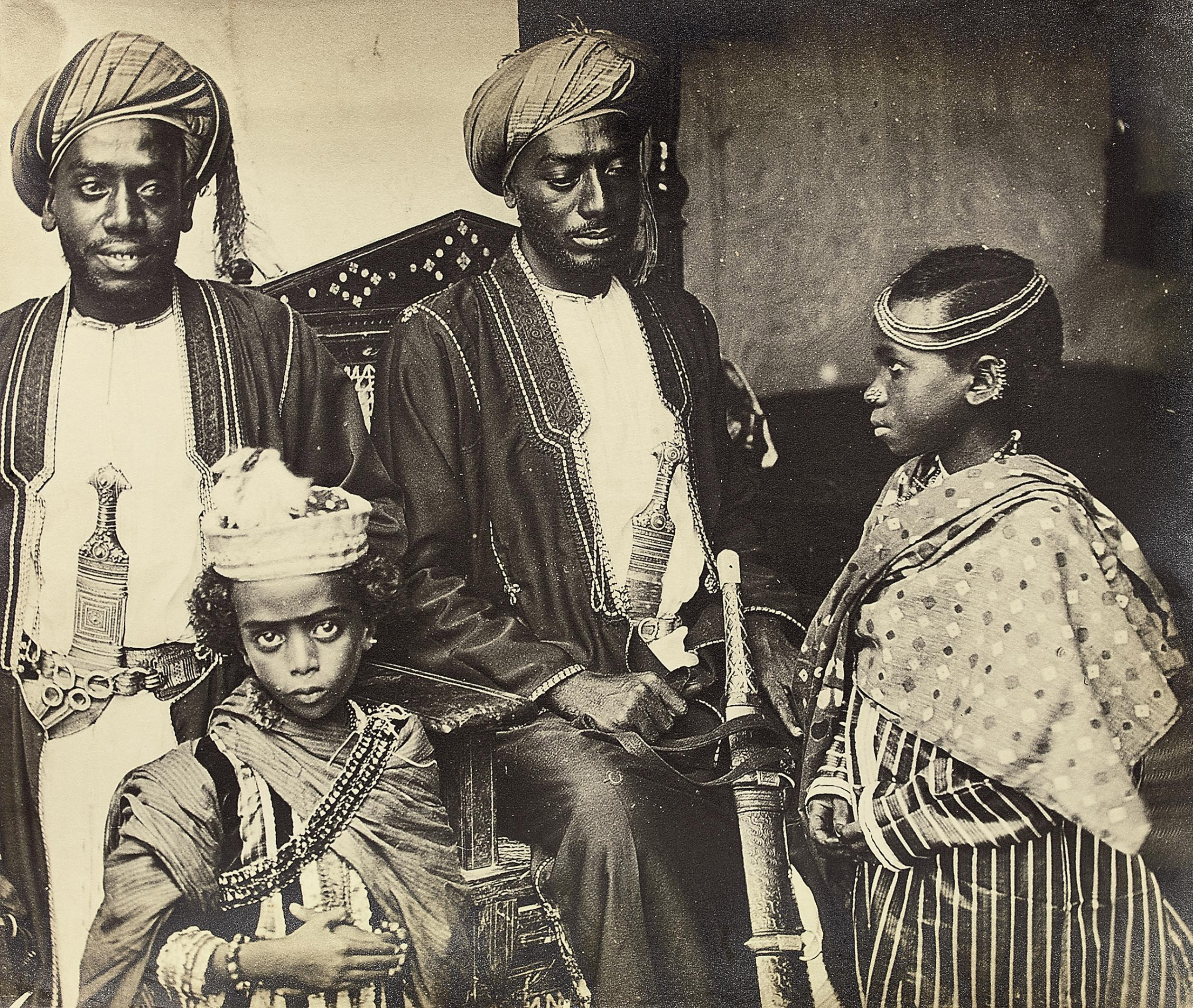
The children of the Sultan of Zanzibar were protected by two palace guards in 1884

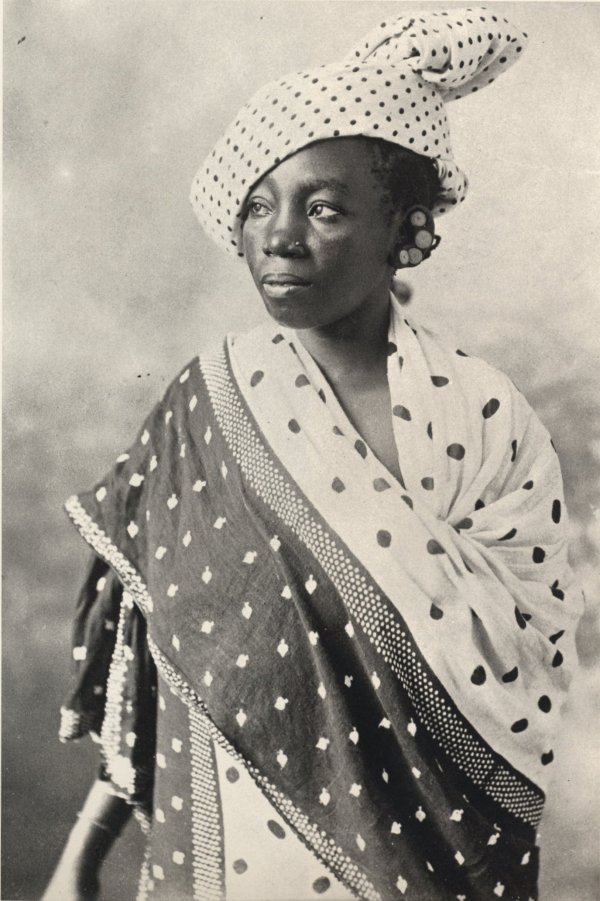
Swahili woman in Zanzibar early 20th century.

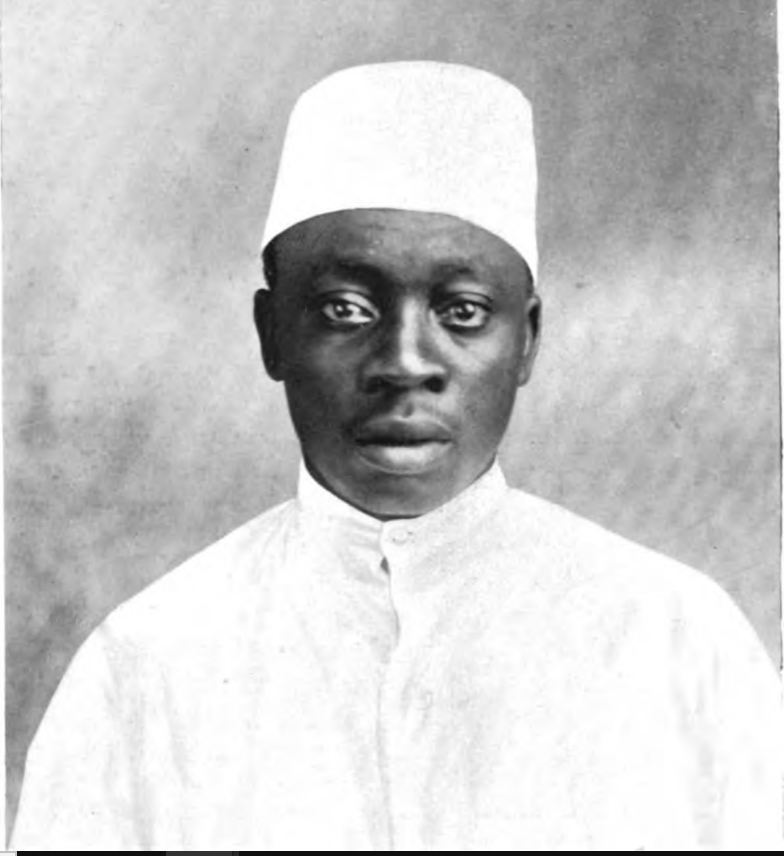
Swahili man in Zanzibar early 20th century.

Historical population

Year	Pop.	±%
1870	70,000	—
1910	35,262	−49.6%
1948	47,284	+34.1%
1958	49,502	+4.7%
1968	68,490	+38.4%

Year	Pop.	±%
1978	110,669	+61.6%
1988	167,318	+51.2%
2002	205,870	+23.0%
2012	223,033	+8.3%
2022	219,007	−1.8%

== See also ==
- Timeline of Zanzibar City
- 2008 Zanzibar power blackout
- Stone Town
- Michenzani
- Zanzibar University
