= The Amazing Race 29 =

Season of television series

- Season 29
- Region 1 DVD cover
- Presented by: Phil Keoghan
- No. of teams: 11
- Winners: Brooke Camhi & Scott Flanary
- No. of legs: 12
- Distance traveled: 36,000 mi (58,000 km)
- No. of episodes: 12

Release
- Original network: CBS
- Original release: March 30 – June 1, 2017

Additional information
- Filming dates: June 10 – July 2, 2016

Series chronology
- ← Previous; Season 28 Next → Season 30

The Amazing Race 29 is the twenty-ninth season of the American reality competition show The Amazing Race. Unlike previous seasons, which almost exclusively featured teams with pre-existing relationships, this season, hosted by Phil Keoghan, featured twenty-two contestants who were all complete strangers who met for the first time and formed eleven teams of two at the starting line before competing in a race around the world. This season visited five continents and nine countries, traveling approximately 36,000 miles (58,000 km) over twelve legs. Filming took place from June 10 to July 2, 2016. Starting in Los Angeles, California, racers traveled through Panama, Brazil, Tanzania, Norway, Italy, Greece, Vietnam, and South Korea, before returning to the United States and finishing in Chicago, Illinois. New elements introduced in this season include a pre-starting line task and allowing teams to use the U-Turn more than once. Elements of the show that returned for this season include an Express Pass hidden on the racecourse and the Blind Double U-Turn. The season premiered on CBS on March 30, 2017, and concluded on June 1, 2017.

Brooke Camhi and Scott Flanary won this season, while Tara Carr and Joey Covino finished in second place, and London Kaye and Logan Bauer finished in third place.

== Format ==
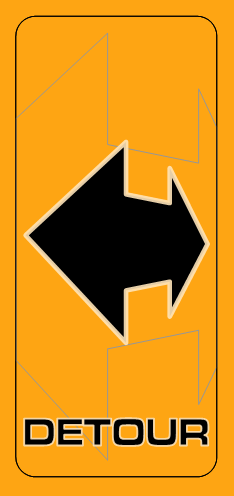
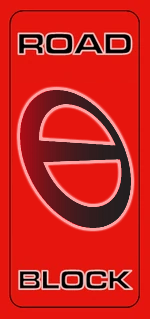
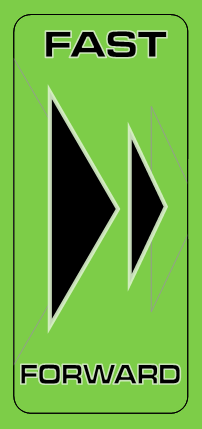
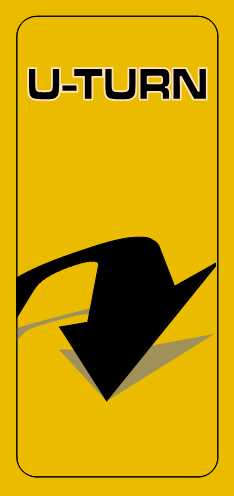
The clues which contestants receive during the course of the race generally fall into five categories: Route Info, Detour, Roadblock, Fast Forward, and U-Turn.

The Amazing Race is a reality television show created by Bertram van Munster and Elise Doganieri, and hosted by Phil Keoghan. The series follows teams of two competing in a race around the world. Each leg of the race requires teams to deduce clues, navigate foreign environments, interact with locals, perform physical and mental challenges, and travel on a limited budget provided by the show. At each stop during the leg, teams receive clues inside sealed envelopes, which fall into one of these categories:

- Route Info: These are simple instructions that teams must follow before they can receive their next clue.
- Detour: A Detour is a choice between two tasks. Teams may choose either task and switch tasks if they find one option too difficult. There is usually one Detour present on each leg.
- Roadblock: A Roadblock is a task that only one team member can complete. Teams must choose which member will complete the task based on a brief clue they receive before fully learning the details of the task. There is usually one Roadblock present on each leg.
- Fast Forward: A Fast Forward is a task that only one team may complete, which allows that team to skip all remaining tasks on the leg and go directly to the next Pit Stop. Teams may only claim one Fast Forward during the entire race.
- U-Turn: The U-Turn allows one team to force another team to complete both options of the Detour before they can continue the race.
- Speed Bump: A penalty for teams who finished in last place on a non-elimination leg. It required the team to complete an additional task in the following leg that only they had to complete.

Most teams who arrive last at the Pit Stop of each leg are progressively eliminated, while the first team to arrive at the finish line in the final episode wins the grand prize of US$1,000,000.

== Contestants ==
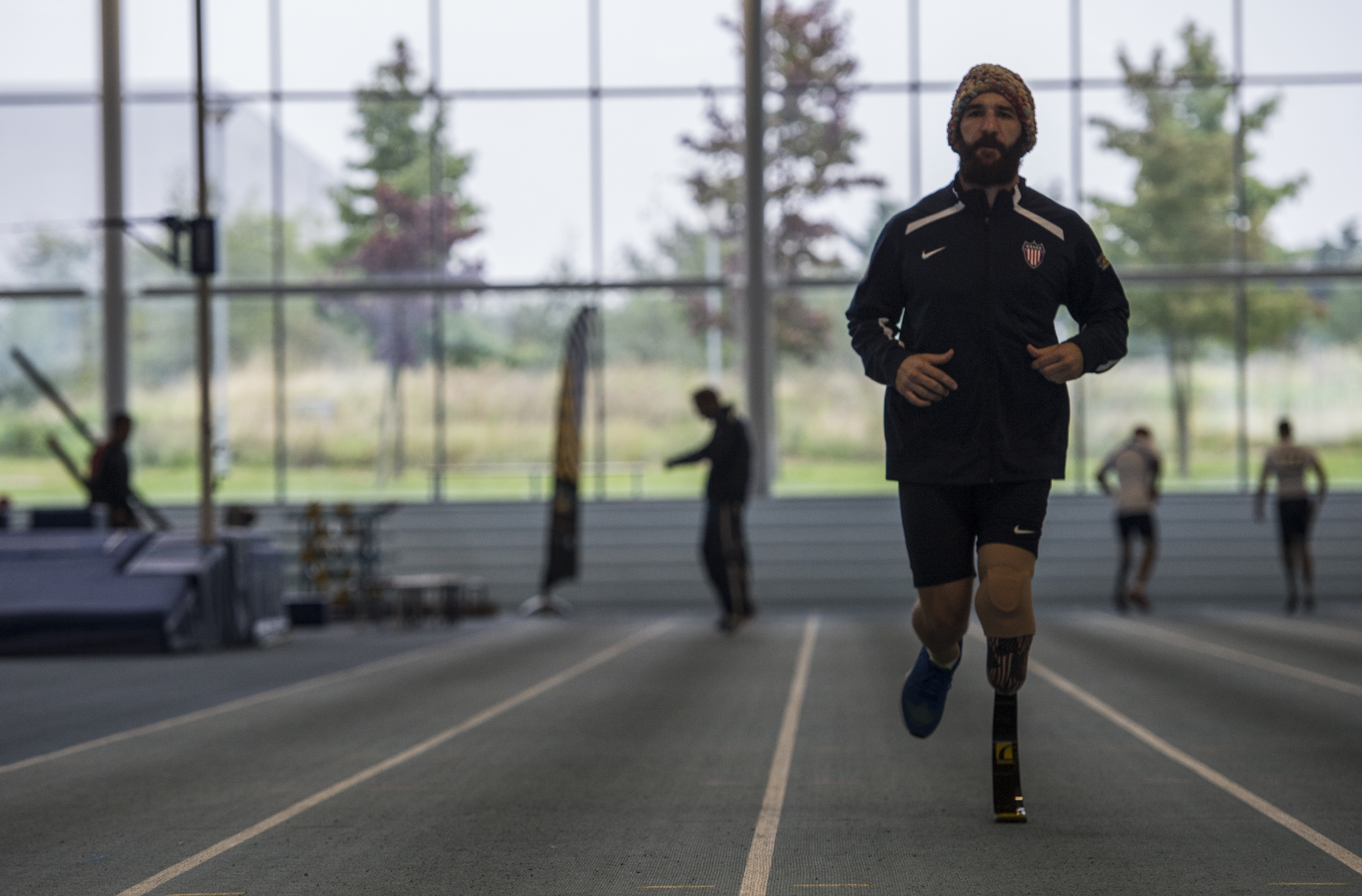
Redmond Ramos

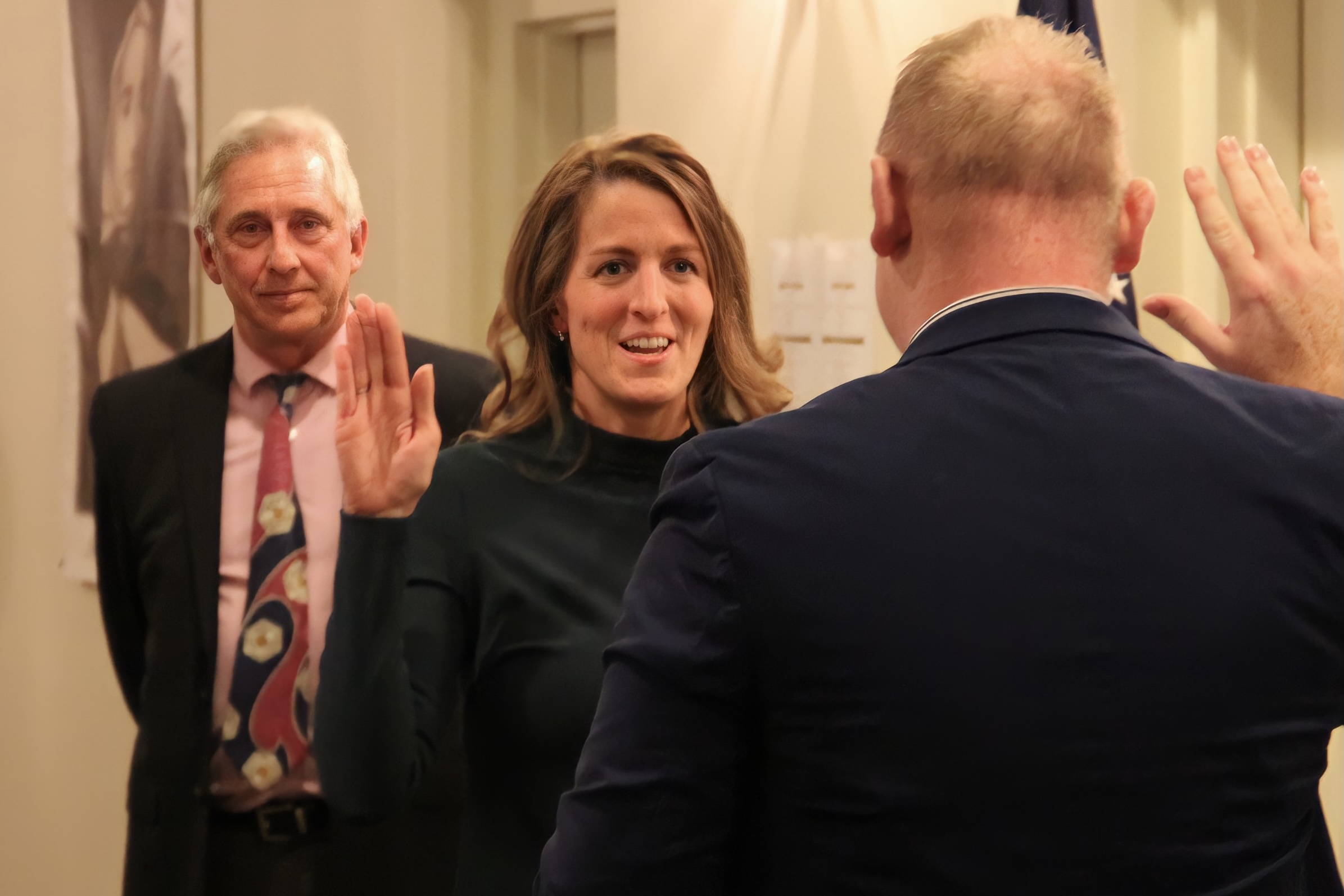
Tara Carr (center)

The contestants were all strangers to each other who met for the first time at the starting line where they paired up into impromptu teams. Winter X Games snowboarder Matt Ladley was one of the twenty-two individuals included in this season's cast.

Contestants	Age	Team Name	Hometown	Status
Kevin Ng	31	Long Hair, Don't Care	San Diego, California	Eliminated 1st (in Panama City, Panama)
Jenn Lee	25	Long Hair, Don't Care	Palos Verdes, California	Eliminated 1st (in Panama City, Panama)
Jessie Shields	28	Swole Sisters	Howland, Ohio	Eliminated 2nd (in São Paulo, Brazil)
Francesca Piccoli	33	Swole Sisters	Banning, California	Eliminated 2nd (in São Paulo, Brazil)
Seth Tyler	37	Team America	Seattle, Washington	Eliminated 3rd (in Zanzibar City, Tanzania)
Olive Beauregard	24	Team America	Providence, Rhode Island	Eliminated 3rd (in Zanzibar City, Tanzania)
Shamir Arzeno	28	The S and S Express	Bronx, New York	Eliminated 4th (in Dar es Salaam, Tanzania)
Sara Fowler	27	The S and S Express	Baltimore, Maryland	Eliminated 4th (in Dar es Salaam, Tanzania)
Vanck Zhu	28	Team Vanck and Ashton	Saint Paul, Minnesota	Eliminated 5th (in Tremezzo, Italy)
Ashton Theiss	25	Team Vanck and Ashton	Fort Worth, Texas	Eliminated 5th (in Tremezzo, Italy)
Liz Espey	24	Team Liz and Mike	Maryville, Missouri	Eliminated 6th (in Athens, Greece)
Michael Rado	37	Team Liz and Mike	Pittsburgh, Pennsylvania	Eliminated 6th (in Athens, Greece)
Becca Droz	26	Team Fun	Pittsburgh, Pennsylvania	Eliminated 7th (in Hoa Lư, Vietnam)
Floyd Pierce	21	Team Fun	Highlands Ranch, Colorado	Eliminated 7th (in Hoa Lư, Vietnam)
Matt Ladley	25	The Boys	Steamboat Springs, Colorado	Eliminated 8th (in Seoul, South Korea)
Redmond Ramos	28	The Boys	Fremont, California	Eliminated 8th (in Seoul, South Korea)
London Kaye	27	Team LoLo	New York City, New York	Third place
Logan Bauer	27	Team LoLo	Navarre, Florida	Third place
Tara Carr	38	Team Mom and Dad	Alexandria, Virginia	Runners-up
Joey Covino	46	Team Mom and Dad	Boston, Massachusetts	Runners-up
Brooke Camhi	36	Team Brooke and Scott	Lynbrook, New York	Winners
Scott Flanary	34	Team Brooke and Scott	Charlotte, North Carolina	Winners

Future appearances

Becca and Floyd returned to compete on The Amazing Race: Reality Showdown. In 2020, Jenn Lee appeared on the thirty-fifth season of The Challenge. In 2026, Brooke Camhi competed on the fifth season of The Floor.

== Contestant progress ==
The following teams are listed with their placements in each leg. Placements are listed in finishing order.

- A red placement with a dagger (†) indicates that the team was eliminated.
- An underlined blue placement with a double-dagger (‡) indicates that the team was the last to arrive at a Pit Stop in a non-elimination leg, and had to perform a Speed Bump task in the following leg.
- An italicized and underlined placement indicates that the team was the last to arrive at a Pit Stop, but there was no rest period at the Pit Stop and all teams were instructed to continue racing. There was no required Speed Bump task in the next leg.
- A green ƒ indicates that the team won the Fast Forward.
- A brown ⊃ indicates that the team used the U-Turn and a brown ⊂ indicates the team on the receiving end of the U-Turn.

Team placement (by leg)
Team	1	2	3	4	5	6	7	8	9	10	11	12
Brooke & Scott	4th	6th	6th	7th	6th	5th	4th	3rd⊃ (Note: Brooke and Scott chose to use the U-Turn on Liz and Michael.)	4th	2nd	1st	1st
Tara & Joey	6th	7th	2nd⊃ (Note: Tara and Joey chose to use the U-Turn on Seth and Olive.)	1st	1st	3rd	3rd	1st⊃ (Note: Tara and Joey chose to use the U-Turn on Becca and Floyd.)	5th‡	3rd	3rd	2nd
London & Logan	8th (Note: Due to a storm at the Detour site, several teams still performing the Detour received time credits, which dropped London and Logan from 6th to 8th.)	8th	5th	5th	5th	6th	5th	4th	3rd	4th	2nd	3rd
Matt & Redmond	3rd	3rd	4th⊂ (Note: Vanck and Ashton chose to use the U-Turn on Matt and Redmond.)	4th	2nd	2nd	1st	2nd	2nd	1st	4th†	
Becca & Floyd	2nd	5th	8th (Note: Becca and Floyd initially arrived 5th, but because Floyd did not have his passport, they could not check in until they found it. Three teams checked in while they were searching, dropping Becca and Floyd to 8th.)	2nd	3rdƒ	1st	2nd	5th⊂	1st	5th†		
Liz & Michael	10th	1st	1st	3rd	7th (Note: This team arrived last at the Pit Stop, but they were instructed to continue racing.)	4th⊃ (Note: Liz and Michael chose to use the U-Turn on Vanck and Ashton.)	6th‡	6th†⊂				
Vanck & Ashton	7th	2nd	3rd⊃	6th	4th	7th†⊂						
Shamir & Sara	5th	9th	7th	8th†								
Seth & Olive	1st	4th	9th†⊂									
Jessie & Francesca	9th	10th†										
Kevin & Jenn	11th† (Note: Kevin and Jenn initially arrived 10th, but were issued a 2-hour penalty, because they were unable to complete either Detour option. Liz and Michael checked in during this time, dropping Kevin and Jenn to last.)											

== Race summary ==
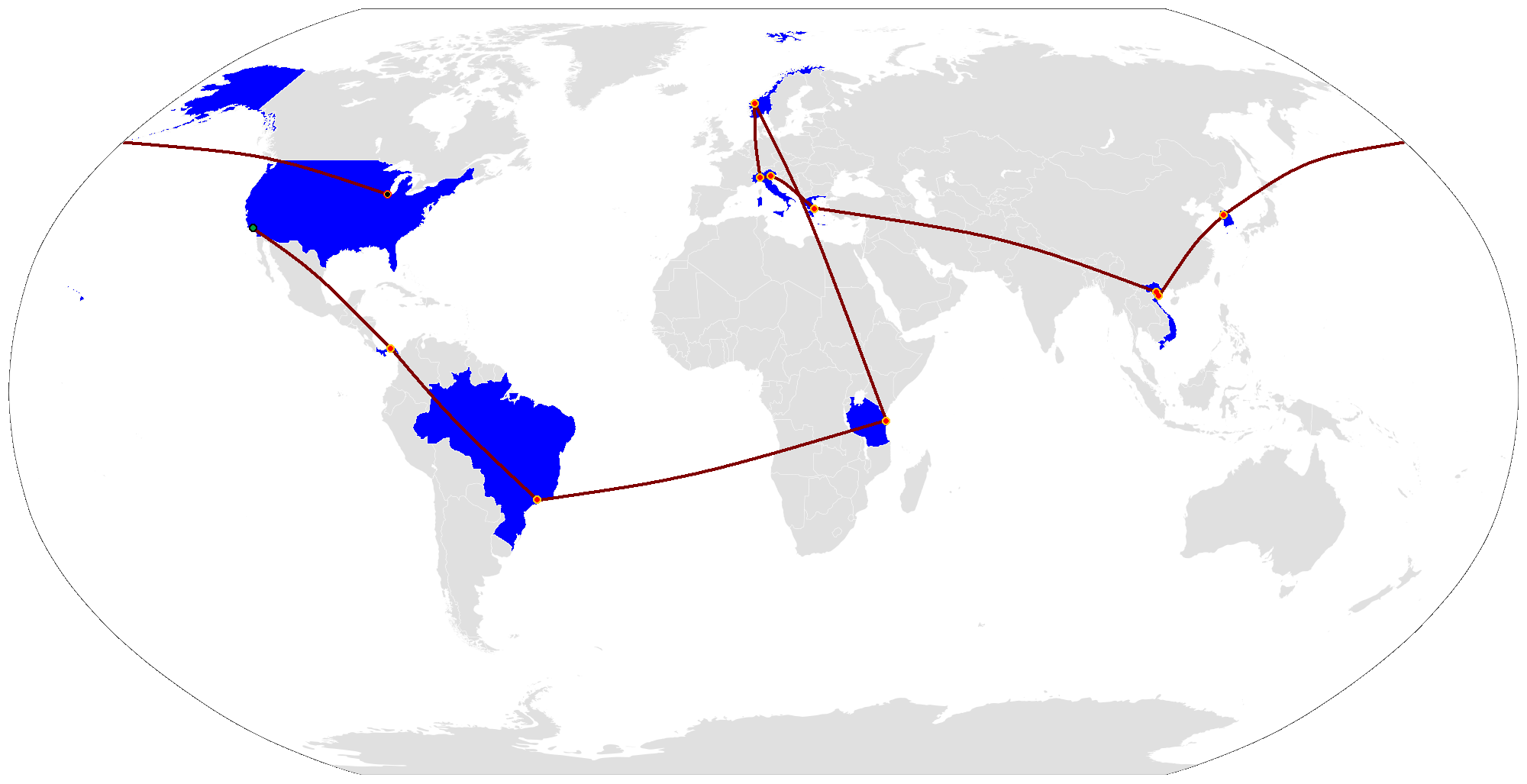
The route of The Amazing Race 29.

Destinations	Air travel Rail travel Water travel Bus travel Helicopter travel Bicycle travel Gondola travel
Route Markers	Detour Roadblock Fast Forward Express Pass; U-Turn Speed Bump Pit Stop

=== Leg 1 (United States → Panama) ===
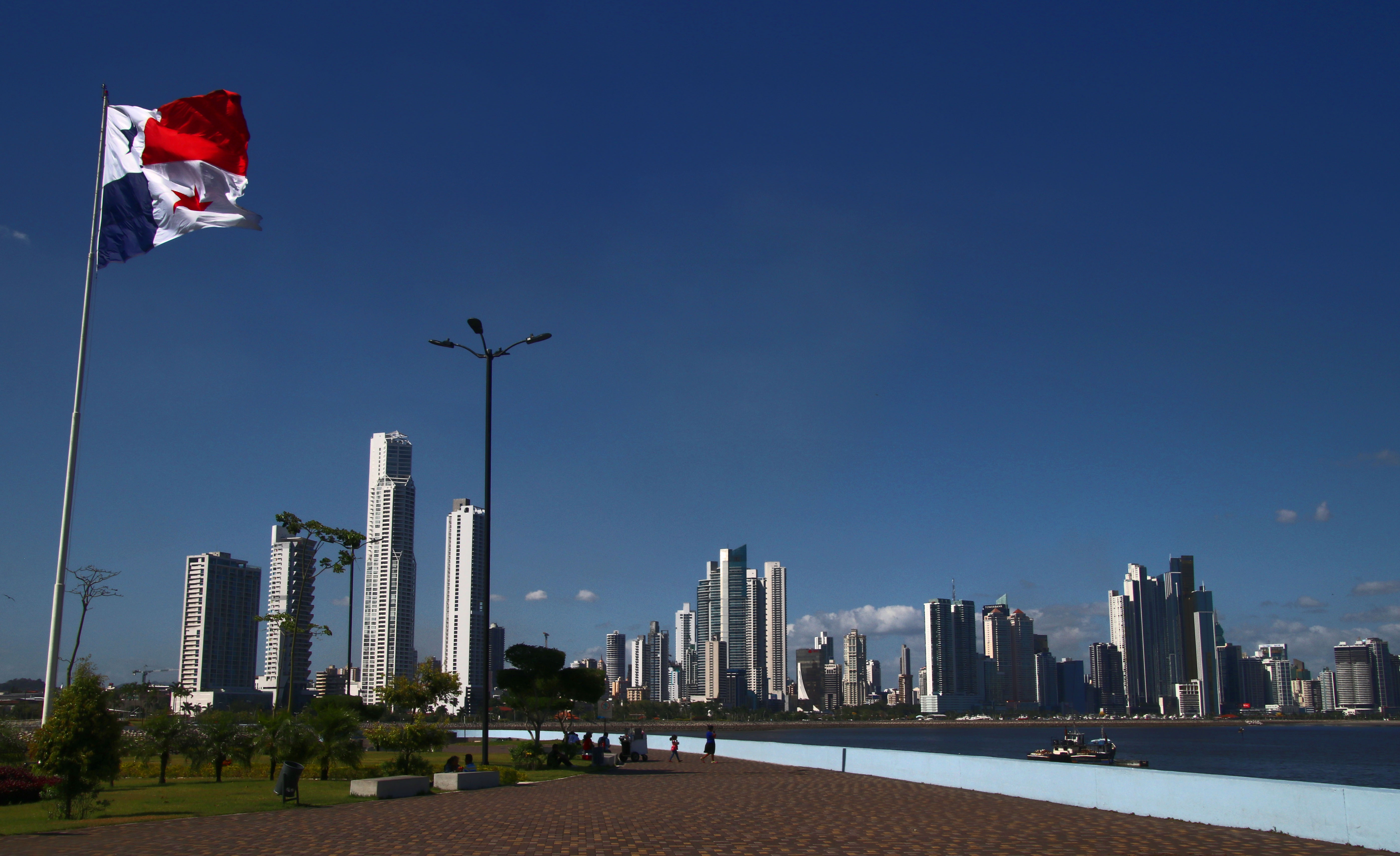
The pavement of Cinta Costera, overlooking the skyline of downtown Panama City, served as the first Pit Stop.

- Episode 1: "We're Coming For You, Phil!" (March 30, 2017)
- Prize: US$2,500 each (awarded to Seth and Olive)
- Eliminated: Kevin and Jenn

Locations

- Los Angeles, California (Grand Hope Park & F&M Gallery – Luggage Shop)
- Los Angeles (Grand Hope Park) (Team Pairings & Starting Line)
- Los Angeles → Panama City, Panama
- Panama City (Panama Canal – Miraflores Locks)
- Soberanía National Park (Panama Rainforest Discovery Center – Canopy Tower)
- Gamboa (Gamboa Rainforest Resort)
- Panama City (Cinta Costera III)

Episode summary

- Twenty-two contestants, all of whom were total strangers to each other, assembled at Grand Hope Park. Phil Keoghan gave them a series of cardinal directions with distances and instructions to find a nearby luggage shop, where they had to retrieve a suitcase tagged with the flag of Panama and return to the park. The contestants were ranked in the order in which they completed this task. Teams were then formed by having the highest-ranked contestant choose their teammate from among the remaining unpaired contestants, and so on. Furthermore, one of the 22 suitcases contained an Express Pass. Becca and Floyd found the Express Pass in one of their suitcases.
- After the teams were formed, they began the race, traveled by taxi to Los Angeles International Airport, and booked one of two flights to Panama City, Panama. (Note: The first Copa Airlines flight carried five teams and was scheduled to arrive 90 minutes before the second flight, which carried the remaining six teams.) As a consolation prize for being the last team formed by default, Jessie and Francesca were driven to the airport by Keoghan himself. Once in Panama City, teams had to drive to the Miraflores Locks and find their next clue, which sent them to the canopy tower of the Panama Rainforest Discovery Center.
- This season's first Detour was a choice between Shoot or Scoot. Both options required teams to paddle a cayuco canoe. In Shoot, teams had to row to a marshy area and use a bow and arrow to shoot down two wooden silver fish hanging on a cluster of bamboo poles to receive their next clue. In Scoot, teams had to beat a pair of professional canoers in a 400-meter (0.25 mi) regatta to receive their next clue. Teams received a 50-meter head start for their second attempt and a 100-meter head start for their third attempt.
- After the Detour, teams had to check in at the Pit Stop: Cinta Costera III in Panama City.

=== Leg 2 (Panama → Brazil) ===
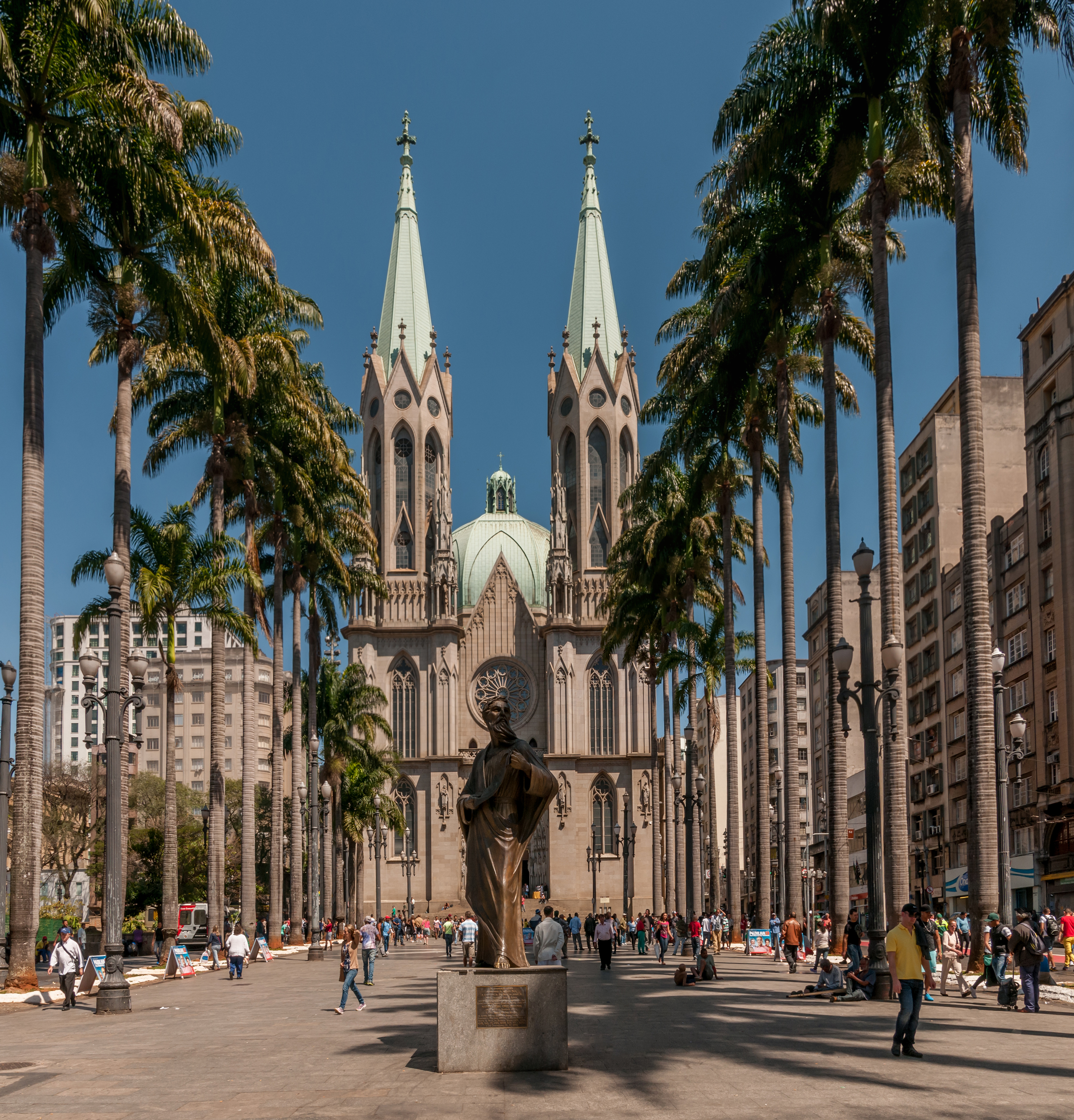
After arriving in São Paulo, teams traveled by helicopter over the city before making their way to Praça da Sé in front of São Paulo Cathedral for their clue.

- Episode 2: "Scared Spitless" (April 6, 2017)
- Prize: A trip for two to Barbados (awarded to Liz and Michael)
- Eliminated: Jessie and Francesca

Locations

- Panama City (Cinta Costera III)
- Panama City (Fantasy Tours)
- Panama City → São Paulo, Brazil
- São Paulo (Helipark Táxi Aéreo e Manutenção Aeronáutica → Maksoud Plaza)
- São Paulo (Praça da Sé)
- São Paulo (Rua General Osório or Rua Palmorino Mônaco)
- São Paulo (Paulista Avenue)
- São Paulo (Instituto Cervantes São Paulo)
- São Paulo (Trianon Park)

Episode summary

- At the start of this leg, teams were instructed to fly to São Paulo, Brazil, with teams required to book their flight at Fantasy Tours. Once there, teams had to sign up for a helicopter ride across São Paulo to a building adjacent to the Praça da Sé, where they found their next clue.
- This leg's Detour was a choice between Keep The Beat or Work Your Feet. In Keep The Beat, teams traveled to Rua General Osório and performed a musical routine with a samba group. One team member had to perform on the surdo drum, and the other had to perform with the chocalho jingle stick to the satisfaction of the band leader to receive their next clue. In Work Your Feet, teams traveled to a stretch of Rua Palmorino Mônaco beneath an overpass where they had to assemble makeshift workout equipment using rudimentary supplies to the satisfaction of a professional boxer to receive their next clue.
- After the Detour, teams had to find a woman with a red and yellow scarf riding a bicycle in the pedestrian zone of Paulista Avenue, who had their next clue.
- In this season's first Roadblock, one team member had to rappel down the façade of the Instituto Cervantes São Paulo and completely wash a marked window before receiving their next clue, which directed them to the Pit Stop: Trianon Park.

=== Leg 3 (Brazil → Tanzania) ===
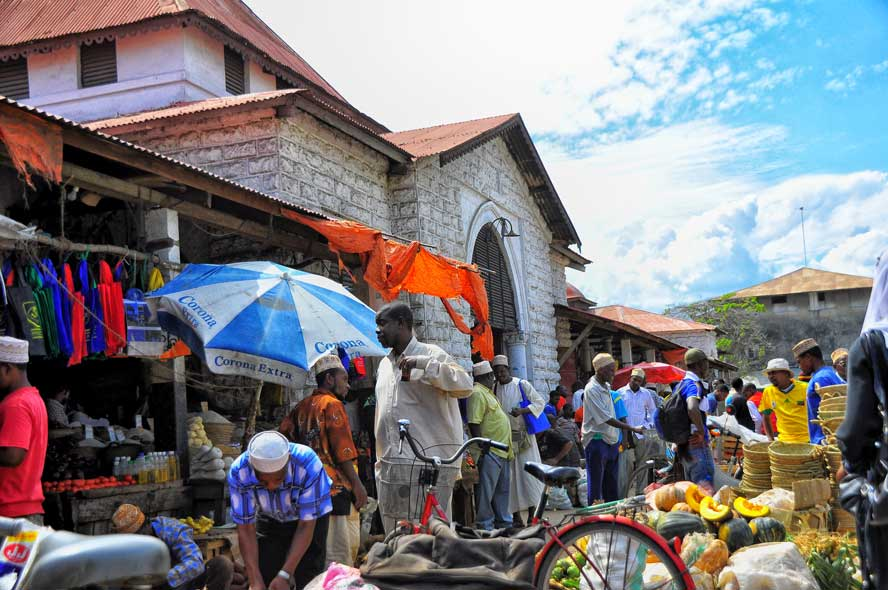
The Roadblock in Zanzibar had racers visit the island's Darajani Market to buy a list of groceries.

- Episode 3: "Bucket List Type Stuff" (April 13, 2017)
- Prize: A trip for two to Amsterdam, Netherlands (awarded to Liz and Michael)
- Eliminated: Seth and Olive

Locations

- São Paulo (Trianon Park)
- São Paulo → Dar es Salaam, Tanzania
- Dar es Salaam (Askari Monument)
- Dar es Salaam → Zanzibar City
- Mkokotoni (Mkokotoni Market)
- Zanzibar City (Stone Town – Darajani Market)
- Zanzibar City (Stone Town – Emerson on Hurumzi Rooftop Tea House)

Episode summary

- At the start of this leg, teams were instructed to fly to Dar es Salaam, Tanzania. Once there, teams had to find the Askari Monument, where they had to search through the classifieds of a newspaper for one with a picture of a boat instructing them to travel by ferry to Zanzibar. Teams then had to travel to Mkokotoni Market and find their next clue.
- This leg's Detour was a choice between Build It or Weave It. In Build It, teams had to build a wooden desk in an outdoor workshop. Once the desk was built to the carpenter's standards, they had to deliver it to a nearby school, where they then learned Swahili greetings from the teacher. After teams could correctly recite four phrases, they received their next clue. In Weave It, teams had to observe a climber harvest coconut leaves from a tall palm tree. They then had to use the leaves to weave a basket as demonstrated to receive their next clue.
- After the Detour, teams had to travel to Darajani Market, which had their next clue.
- In this leg's Roadblock, one team member received a list of local food items, with some of the items written in Swahili. They had to purchase all of the items and give the ingredients to the chef outside of the market in exchange for their next clue, which directed them to the Pit Stop: the Emerson on Hurumzi Rooftop Tea House in Stone Town.

Additional note

- This leg featured a Blind Double U-Turn. Tara and Joey chose to use the U-Turn on Seth and Olive, while Vanck and Ashton chose to use the U-Turn on Matt and Redmond.

=== Leg 4 (Tanzania) ===
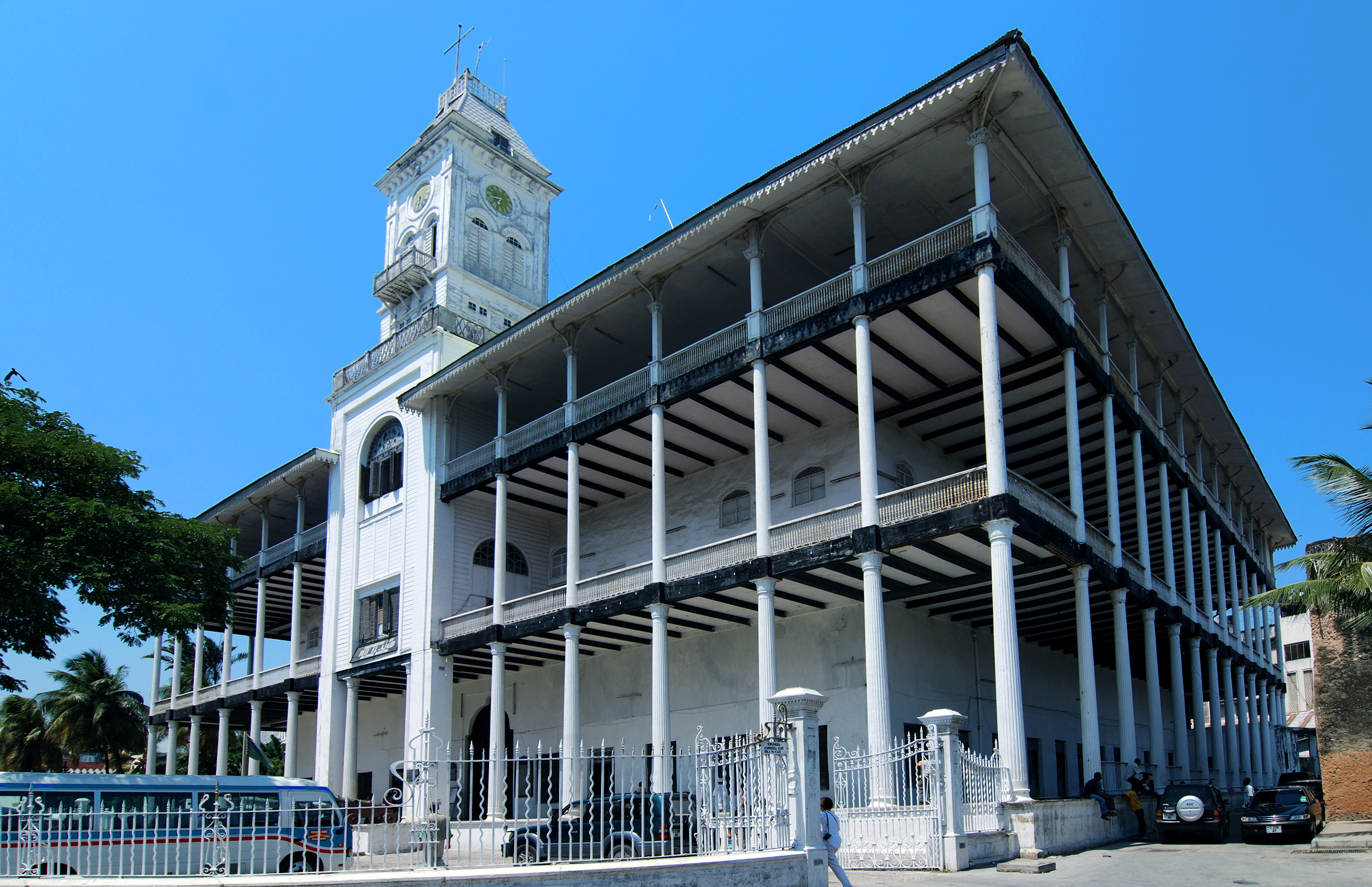
One of the Detour choices in Zanzibar had teams searching throughout Stone Town for Islamic-influenced royal doors, one of which was located at the House of Wonders.

- Episode 4: "Another One Bites the Dust" (April 20, 2017)
- Prize: US$5,000 each (awarded to Tara and Joey)
- Eliminated: Shamir and Sara

Locations

- Zanzibar City (Stone Town – Emerson on Hurumzi Rooftop Tea House)
- Zanzibar City (Stone Town – Mercury House)
- Zanzibar City (Stone Town – Al-Tamimi Curio Shop or Soko Muhogo Street, House of Wonders, Hurumzi Street & Gizenga Street)
- Zanzibar City → Dar es Salaam
- Dar es Salaam (DASICO Umasida Dispensary)
- Dar es Salaam (Msasani – Coco Beach)

Episode summary

- At the start of this leg, teams were instructed to find the house of "Farrokh Bulsara", whom they had to figure out was actually Freddie Mercury, and then travel to his childhood house in Stone Town for their next clue.
- This leg's Detour was a choice between Lock or Knock. In Lock, teams had to go to the Al-Tamimi Curio Shop and look through wooden chests, each one carved with a secret compartment into the main drawer, for a key with an attached piece of paper showing a symbol. Once teams found the key, they had to find a cabinet with the same symbol, unlock it, and retrieve their next clue. In Knock, teams had to travel through the streets of Stone Town to locate three royal doors, which were distinguished by the carving of a lion, serpent, and falcon, knock on each of them, and receive a wooden carving. After collecting all three carvings, teams then had to deliver them to a shop on Gizenga Street in exchange for their next clue.
- After the Detour, teams had to travel by ferry back to Dar es Salaam and then travel to DASICO Umasida Dispensary, which had their next clue.
- In this leg's Roadblock, one team member had to correctly make a ladle strainer out of sheet metal to receive their next clue, which directed them to the Pit Stop: Coco Beach.

Additional note

- Shamir and Sara fell behind and arrived at the Roadblock after all of the other teams had already checked in at the Pit Stop. Phil went to the Roadblock to inform them of their elimination.

=== Leg 5 (Tanzania → Norway) ===
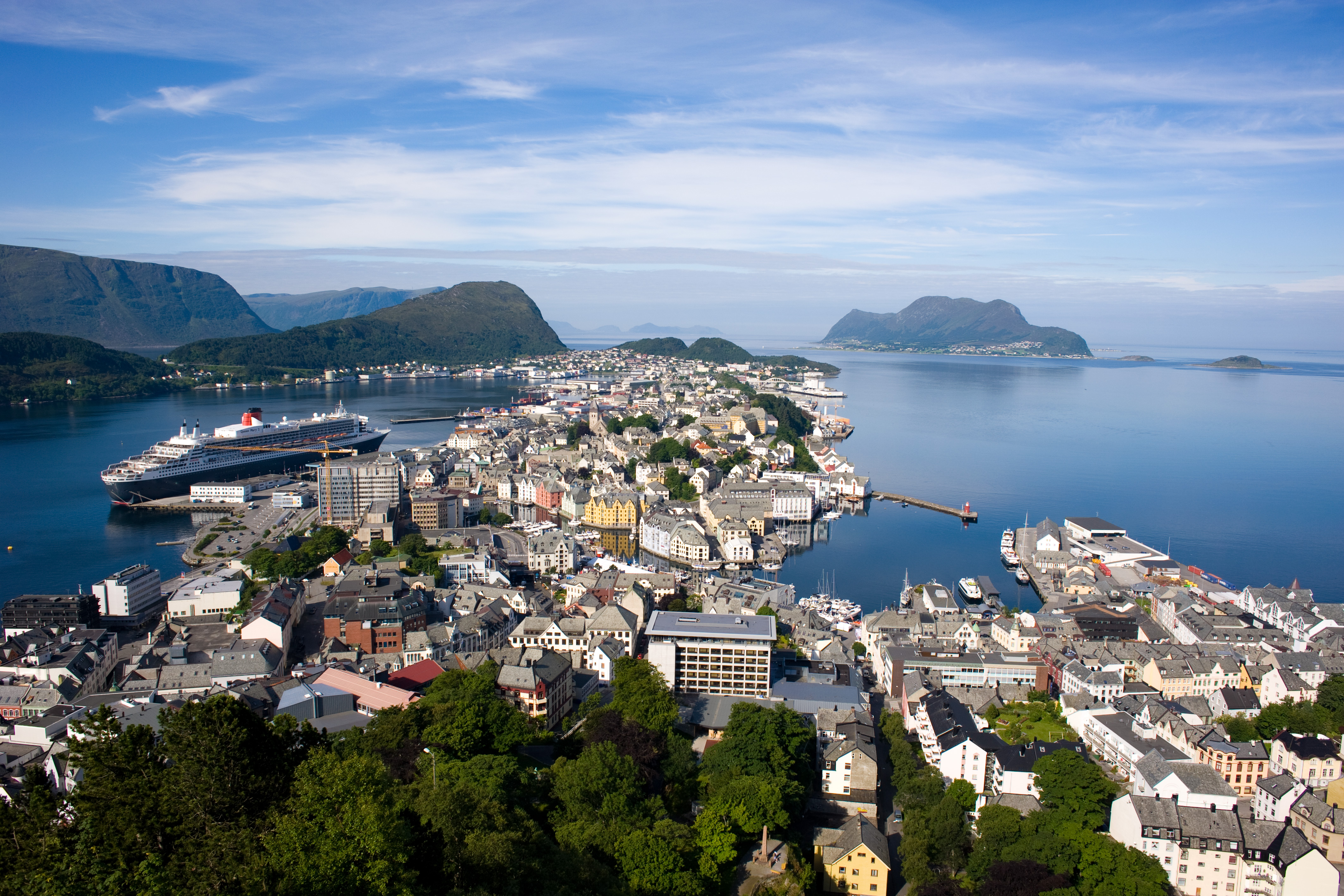
Teams ended the leg in Norway at the top of Mount Aksla, the viewpoint hill overlooking the town of Ålesund.

- Episode 5: "Have Faith in Me, Broski" (April 20, 2017)

Locations

- Dar es Salaam (Msasani – Coco Beach)
- Dar es Salaam (ABC Travel & Tours Ltd)
- Dar es Salaam → Ålesund, Norway
- Godøy (Høgsteinen Fyr Lighthouse)
  - Geiranger (Geirangerfjord)
- Slinningen (Slinningsbålet)
- Ålesund (Arbeideren Kulturhus & Downtown Ålesund or Kayak More Tomorrow & Brosundet Canal)
- Ålesund (Mount Aksla)

Episode summary

- At the start of this leg, teams were instructed to fly to Ålesund, Norway, with teams required to book their flight at ABC Travel & Tours Ltd. Once there, teams had to drive to the Høgsteinen Fyr Lighthouse, where both team members had to consume a serving of rakfisk – fermented fish – to receive their next clue.
- In this season's only Fast Forward, one team had to board a helicopter from an adjacent field at the lighthouse and fly to Geirangerfjord, where they had to perform a tandem skydive from a height of 10,000 feet (3,000 m). Becca and Floyd won the Fast Forward.
- Teams who did not attempt the Fast Forward had to drive to the Slinningsbålet and find their next clue.
- In this leg's Roadblock, one team member had to climb the side of a 13-story tower made out of 31,000 wooden pallets, and then nail down one pallet at the top of the stack to help create the world's tallest bonfire and receive their next clue.
- This leg's Detour was a choice between Trolls or Troll. In Trolls, teams had to go to the Kulturhus in downtown Ålesund, where an actress gave them a scroll containing a poem and a map of the town highlighting six images of sculptures. Using the map, they had to locate each building with the corresponding sculpture, and at each location, they had to recite the poem at the doorway, at which point a troll gave them a large fake firework. Once they returned to the Kulturhus with all six fireworks, they received a scroll with the name of the next Pit Stop. In Troll, teams had to travel to Kayak More Tomorrow and paddle a kayak along Brosundet Canal to search among fishing lures for one imprinted with the name of the next Pit Stop.
- After the Detour, teams had to check in at the Pit Stop: Mount Aksla.

Additional note

- There was no elimination at the end of this leg; all teams were instead instructed to continue racing.

=== Leg 6 (Norway → Italy) ===
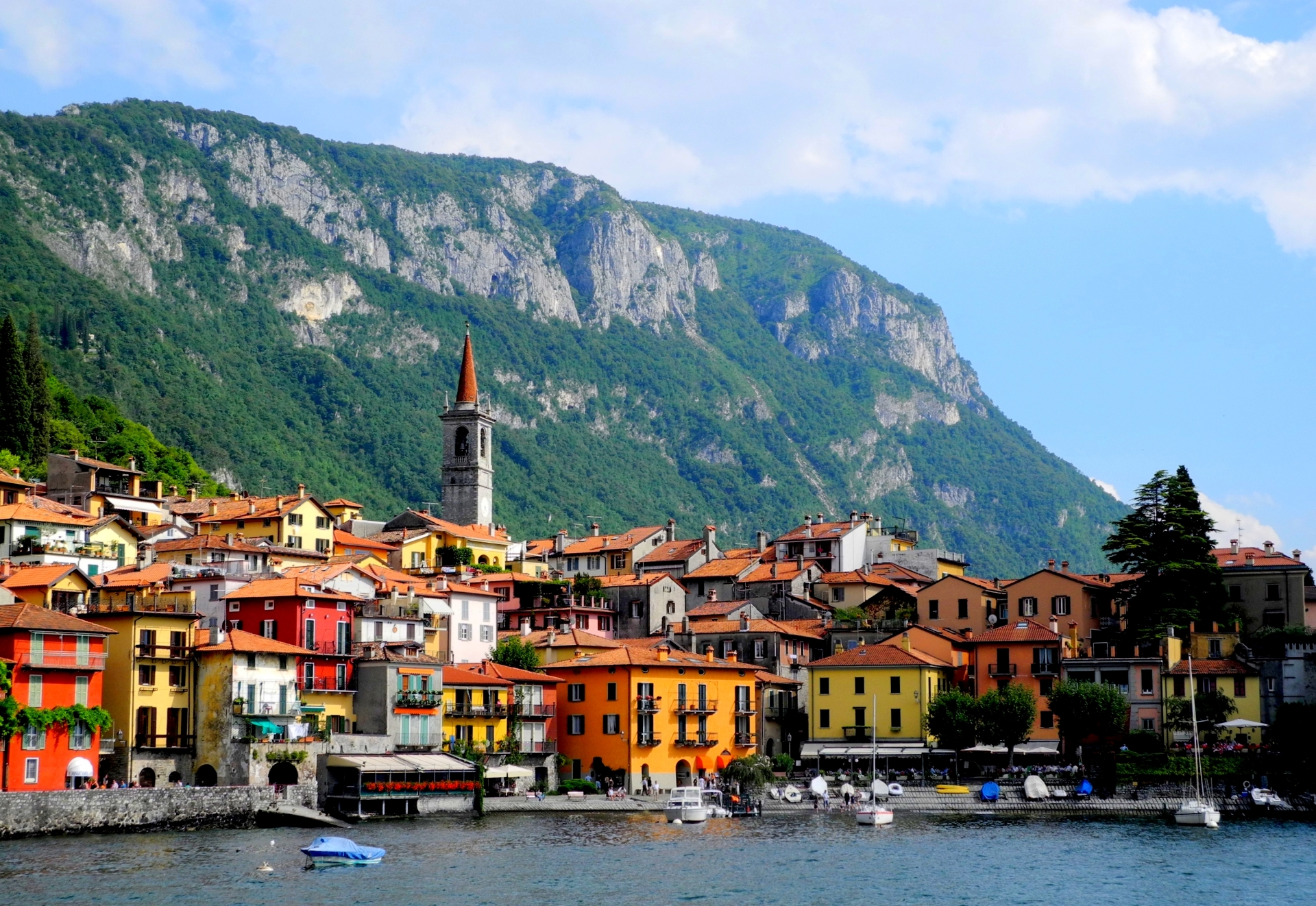
This leg in Italy featured the villages along the shoreline of Lake Como, including Varenna.

- Episode 6: "Double U-Turn Ahead" (April 27, 2017)
- Prize: A trip for two to Ushuaia, Argentina (awarded to Becca and Floyd)
- Eliminated: Vanck and Ashton

Locations

- Åndalsnes → Oslo
- Oslo → Milan, Italy
- Milan (Piazza Fontana)
- Milan (ATMosfera Tram Ristorante)
- Cernobbio (Navigazione Lago di Como) → Varenna (Varenna Ferry Terminal)
- Varenna (Greenway dei Patriarchi)
- Perledo (Castello di Vezio) or Menaggio (L'Angolo Benedetto Castelli)
- Tremezzo (Teresio Olivelli Park)

Episode summary

- At the start of this leg, teams were instructed to travel by train to Oslo, and then fly to Milan, Italy, with teams required to book their flight through a mobile app. Once there, teams had to find their next clue at the Piazza Fontana.
- In this leg's Roadblock, one team member had to ride the restaurant tram ATMosfera Tram Ristorante and find three marked words along the ride (Cernobbio, Concordia, and Lago) while consuming a plate of gnocchi and eggplant parmigiana. At the end of the ride, racers had to recite the three correct words to the tram conductor to receive their next clue; otherwise, they had to perform the task again.
- After the Roadblock, teams had to travel to the steamboat Concordia in Cernobbio and claim a departure time for the following morning. Overnight, the steamboat took teams across Lake Como to Varenna. The next morning, teams opened their next clue at the Varenna Ferry Terminal, which told them that their next clue was at Greenway dei Patriarchi.
- This leg's Detour was a choice between Make a Mold or Grab a Hold. In Make a Mold, teams had to travel to Castello di Vezio and assemble a ghost figure by using one teammate as a wire mesh mold for a plaster mold casting to receive their next clue. In Grab a Hold, teams had to travel to L'Angolo Benedetto Castelli, where one team member had to climb 90 feet (27 m) up the face of a rock to retrieve their next clue while their partner belayed the line from the bottom.
- After the Detour, teams had to travel by Riva Aquarama to Tremezzo and search the shoreline for the Pit Stop: Teresio Olivelli Park, overlooking Lake Como.

Additional note

- This leg featured a Double U-Turn. Liz and Michael chose to use the U-Turn on Vanck and Ashton, while Becca and Floyd chose to use the U-Turn on Liz and Michael. However, Liz and Michael had already passed the U-Turn by this point and were therefore unaffected.

=== Leg 7 (Italy) ===
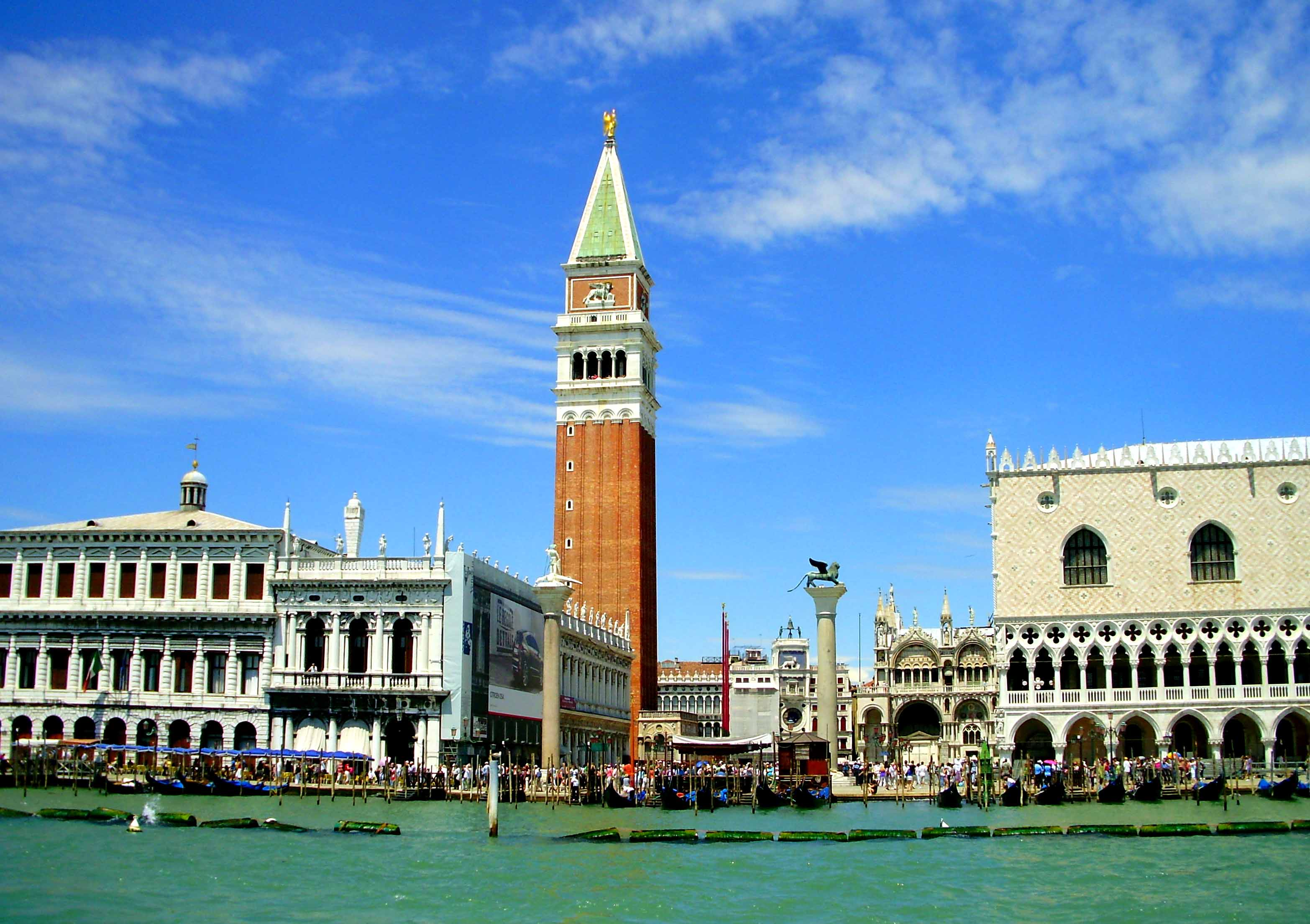
After arriving in Venice, teams had to search Piazza San Marco for a spazzino.

- Episode 7: "Have Fun and Get It Done" (May 4, 2017)
- Prize: A trip for two to Grenada (awarded to Matt and Redmond)

Locations

- Cernobbio (Piazza Risorgimento – Monumento ai Caduti)
- Cernobbio → Venice
- Venice (Piazza San Marco)
- Venice (Trattoria al Ponte del Megio or Campo San Polo)
- Venice (Ca' Zenobio)
- Venice (Campo San Vio)

Episode summary

- At the start of this leg, teams boarded one of two buses to Venice. Once there, teams had to take a water taxi to Piazza San Marco and find a spazzino, a local street-sweeper, who handed them their next clue.
- This leg's Detour was a choice between Sing It or Bring It. In Sing It, teams had to dress as gondoliers, learn a traditional Italian serenade called "La Biondina in Gondoleta", and then perform the song aboard a gondola along the Grand Canal to the satisfaction of the mandolin player to receive their next clue. In Bring It, teams had to work as porters by stacking a dolly with suitcases and then navigating through the stairs and narrow alleys to deliver them to the hotel listed on the luggage tags in exchange for their next clue.
- After the Detour, teams had to travel to Ca' Zenobio, which had their next clue.
- In this leg's Roadblock, one team member had to choose an actor from a commedia dell'arte performance and paint an exact copy of their mask to receive their next clue, which directed them to the Pit Stop: Campo San Vio.

Additional note

- This was a non-elimination leg.

=== Leg 8 (Italy → Greece) ===
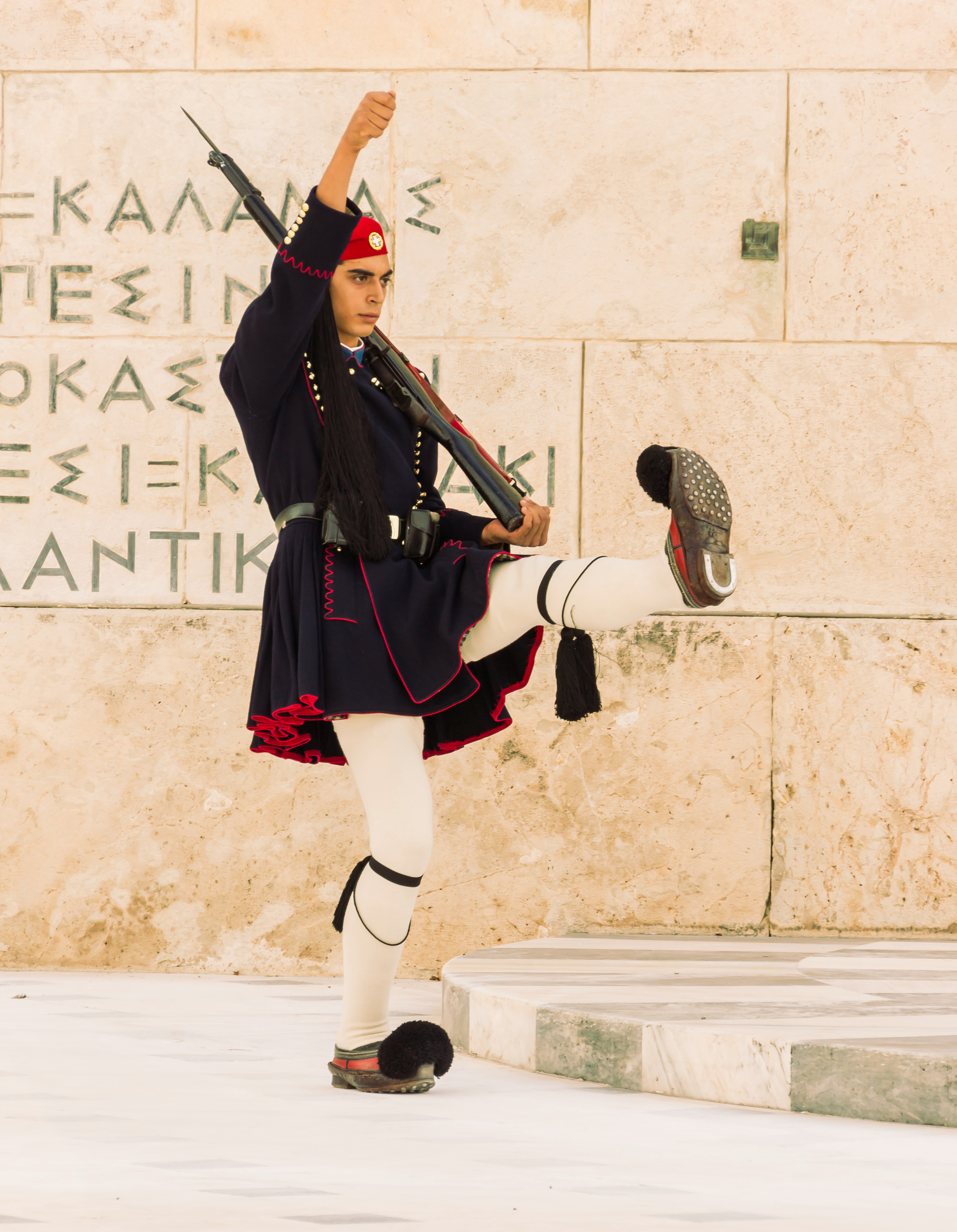
For the Roadblock in Athens, one team member dressed as a Greek Presidential Guard and performed the changing of the guard.

- Episode 8: "Good Job, Donkey" (May 11, 2017)
- Prize: US$7,500 each (awarded to Tara and Joey)
- Eliminated: Liz and Michael

Locations

- Venice (Ponte della Costituzione)
- Venice → Bari
- Bari → Patras, Greece (Port of Patras)
- Arachova (Kaplanis Taverna)
- Arachova (Streets of Arachova or Egarsios Steps & Church of Saint George)
- Athens (Panathenaic Stadium)
  - Athens (Zappeion Garden – Kantina Food Truck)
- Athens (Zappeion)
- Athens (Areopagus)

Episode summary

- At the start of this leg, teams were instructed to fly to Bari and then travel by ferry to Patras, Greece. Once there, teams found their next clue on a marked car at the port, which instructed them to drive to the Kaplanis Taverna in Arachova.
- This leg's Detour was a choice between For the Bride or For the Groom. In For the Bride, teams had to transport two containers of sheep milk on a donkey through the streets of Arachova, find local cheese makers, exchange each container for a piece of cheese, and deliver both cheeses to a bride. In For the Groom, teams had to compete in a footrace with locals up the Egarsios Steps leading to the Church of Saint George, find a shepherd who gave them a sheep and a goat, and deliver them to a groom. After completing either Detour task, teams received a plate, which they had to break before finding their next clue baked inside.
- After the Detour, teams drove to the Panathenaic Stadium in Athens, where they had to run one complete victory lap around the track before receiving their next clue directing them to the Zappeion.
- For their Speed Bump, Liz and Michael had to prepare a skewered dish called kokoretsi by wrapping sections of meat with intestines in a nearby food truck before they could continue racing.
- In this leg's Roadblock, one team member had to learn the changing of the guard routine of the Greek Presidential Guards that takes place outside the Tomb of the Unknown Soldier. Racers had to perform it inside the Zappeion Hall in sync with an Evzone to the satisfaction of a command instructor to receive their next clue, which directed them to the Pit Stop: Areopagus, beneath the Acropolis of Athens.

Additional note

- This leg featured a Double U-Turn. Brooke and Scott chose to use the U-Turn on Liz and Michael, while Tara and Joey chose to use the U-Turn on Becca and Floyd.

=== Leg 9 (Greece → Vietnam) ===
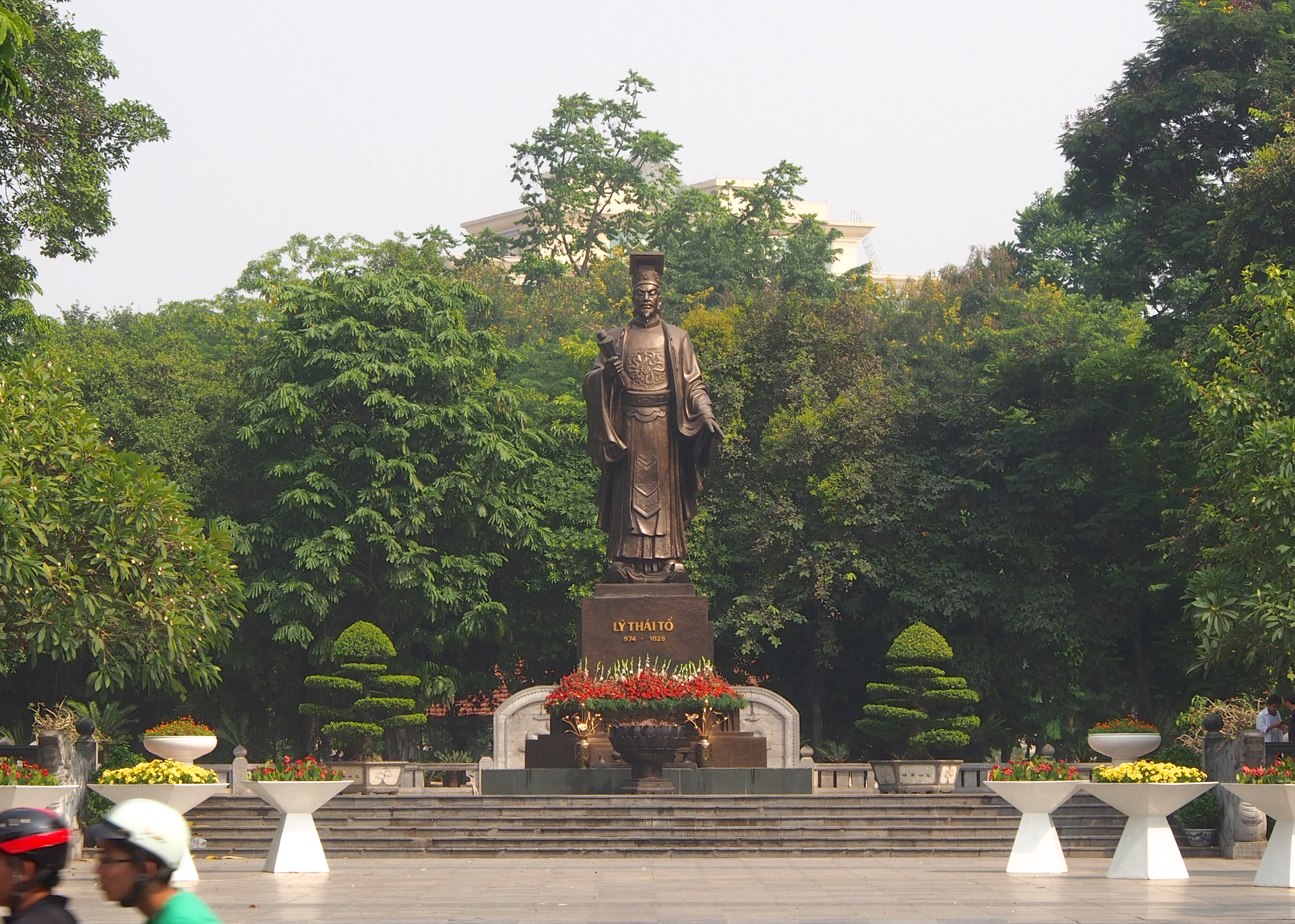
After arriving in the Vietnamese capital city of Hanoi, teams headed to Tượng Đài Lý Thái Tổ, overlooking Hoàn Kiếm Lake, to receive their clue from a group of dancers waving fans.

- Episode 9: "I Thought We Were Playing It Nice" (May 18, 2017)
- Prize: A trip for two to Galapagos Islands (awarded to Becca and Floyd)

Locations

- Athens (Volterou Street)
- Corinth (Corinth Canal – Old Bridge)
- Athens → Hanoi, Vietnam
- Hanoi (Tượng Đài Lý Thái Tổ)
- Hanoi (Quán Sứ Temple)
- Hanoi (Hoàn Kiếm District – 42 Hàng Vải Street & 56 Cầu Gỗ Street or 41 Cửa Nam Street & Chân Cầm Street)
- Hanoi (Thống Nhất Park)

Episode summary

- At the start of this leg, teams had to travel to the Corinth Canal and find their next clue.
- This leg's Roadblock was a Switchback from season 9, where the team member who had yet to perform their fourth Roadblock had to bungee jump 240 feet (73 m) off a bridge into the Corinth Canal to receive their next clue. (Note: Due to their Fast Forward win in Leg 5, Becca and Floyd were able to freely choose who performed this Roadblock.)
- After the Roadblock, teams were instructed to fly to Hanoi, Vietnam. Once there, teams had to search among a group of dancers waving fans at Tượng Đài Lý Thái Tổ. When they found a fan with a yellow marker, the dancer gave them their next clue, which directed teams to the Quán Sứ Temple.
- This season's final Detour was a choice between Bamboo Climb or Window Design. In Bamboo Climb, teams had to transport a 15-foot ladder made of bamboo through the streets to an apartment building and get it up a narrow stairwell. On the roof, they had to use the ladder to retrieve a birdcage and then return both the cage and the ladder to the starting point to receive their next clue. In Window Design, teams had to carry three mannequins through the streets to a clothing shop, where they had to dress and arrange them in the window to match a provided photo before receiving their next clue.
- After the Detour, teams had to check in at the Pit Stop: Thống Nhất Park.

Additional note

- This was a non-elimination leg.

=== Leg 10 (Vietnam) ===
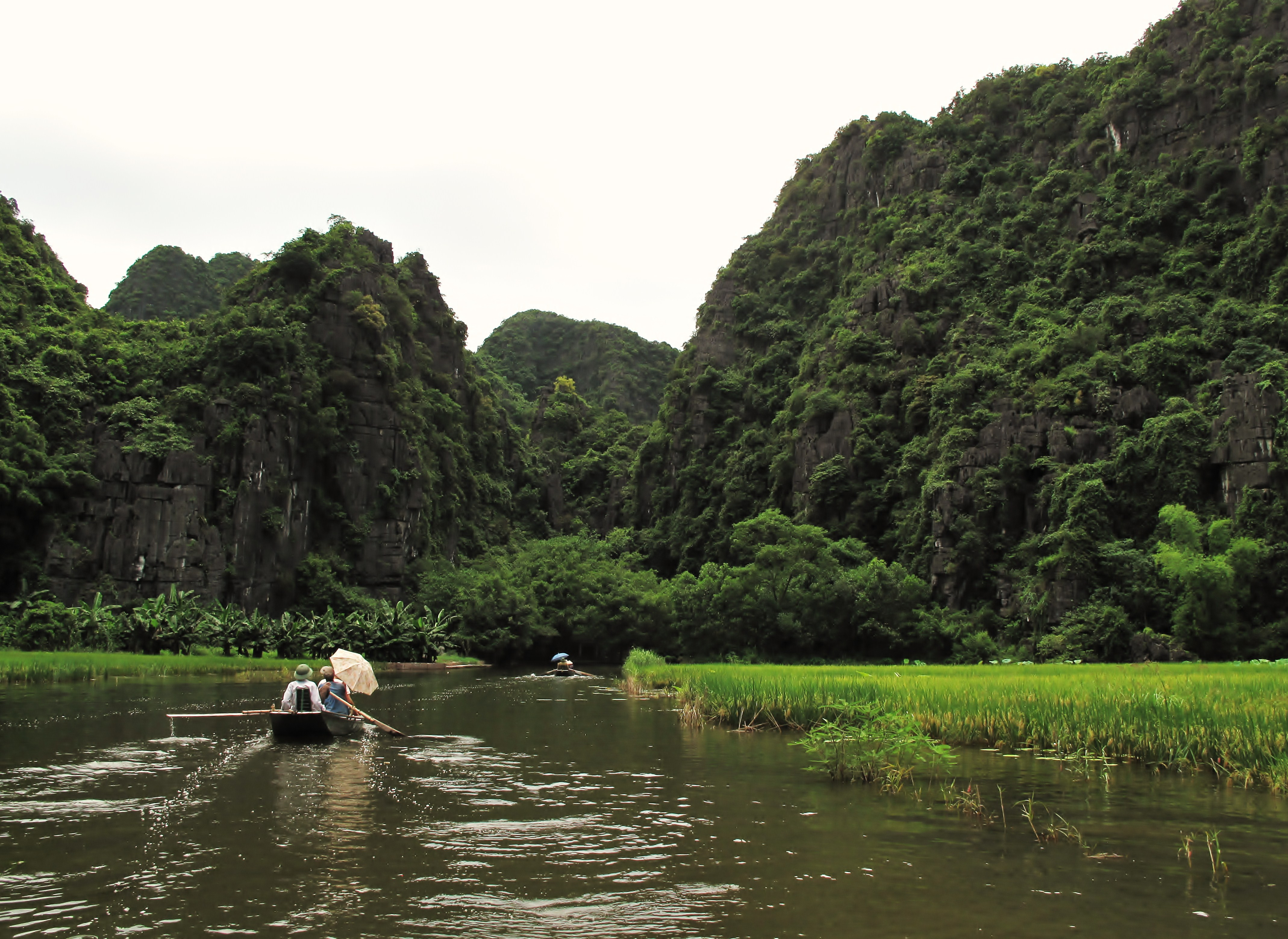
The province of Ninh Bình in Northern Vietnam, known for its limestone mountains landscape, was visited by teams in this leg.

- Episode 10: "Riding a Bike Is Like Riding a Bike" (May 18, 2017)
- Prize: A trip for two to Costa Rica (awarded to Matt and Redmond)
- Eliminated: Becca and Floyd

Locations

- Hanoi (Thống Nhất Park)
- Hanoi → Ninh Bình
- Hoa Lư (Tam Cốc Wharf)
- Hoa Lư (Bích Động Temple)
- Hoa Lư (Thôn Hải Nham)
- Hoa Lư (Đền Thái Vi – Bến Thành)
- Hoa Lư (Tam Cốc Wharf)
- Hoa Lư (Tam Cốc – Hang Múa Peak)

Episode summary

- At the start of this leg, teams were instructed to travel by bus to Ninh Bình. Once there, teams traveled to the nearby Tam Cốc Wharf, where they chose two bicycles, which then would be their only means of transportation for most of the leg. After biking to Bích Động Temple, teams had to search the grounds for their next clue, which directed them to Thôn Hải Nham, and a Travelocity Roaming Gnome, which they had to keep with them for the remainder of the leg.
- For their Speed Bump, Tara and Joey had to collect 72 duck eggs from around a pond before they could continue racing.
- This leg's Roadblock was a Switchback from season 3, where one team member had to load a bicycle with a number of large and small shrimp traps and deliver them to a fisherman one mile (1.6 km) down the road in exchange for their next clue.
- After the Roadblock, teams found their next clue at Bến Thành. There, teams had to collect and deliver an offering of specified prayer items up the Ngô Đồng River to a ceremonial dragon boat. One team member had to row the oars using the traditional method of only using their feet. Once they delivered their offering, they returned to the pier, accompanied by their respective dragon boat, and received their next clue, which instructed them to climb the Lying Dragon Mountain (Vietnamese: Núi Ngọa Long) trail to the Pit Stop at the top of Hang Múa Peak.

Additional notes

- On the way to Đền Thái Vi, Floyd became dizzy due to fatigue and medics were called out. After all of the other teams had already checked in at the Pit Stop, Phil came out to their location to inform them of their elimination.
- Legs 9 and 10 aired back-to-back as a special two-hour episode.

=== Leg 11 (Vietnam → South Korea) ===
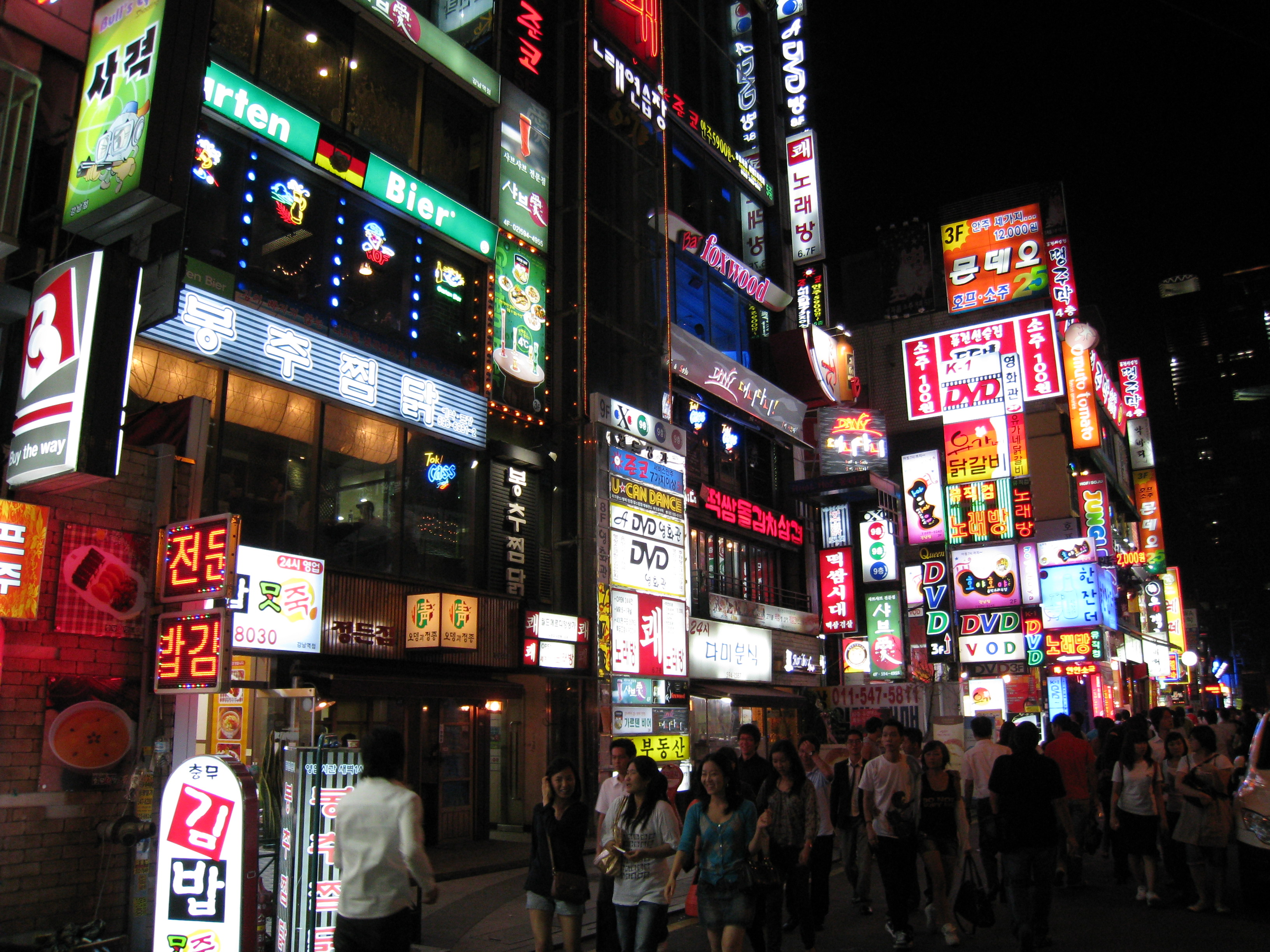
After arriving in South Korea, teams headed to the Gangnam District of Seoul and received their next clue from K-pop dancers.

- Episode 11: "As Easy As Stacking Cups" (May 25, 2017)
- Eliminated: Matt and Redmond

Locations

- Hoa Lư (Hidden Charm Hotel)
- Hanoi → Seoul, South Korea
- Seoul (Gangnam District – Gangnam Station)
- Seoul (Hanyang University Olympic Gymnasium)
- Seoul (Mugyewon Arts & Cultural Center)
- Seoul (OGN e-Stadium)
- Seoul (Sebitseom – Gavit Some Roof Garden)

Episode summary

- At the start of this leg, teams were instructed to fly to Seoul, South Korea. Once there, teams had to find an outdoor K-pop performance in the Gangnam District to receive their next clue directing them to Hanyang University Olympic Gymnasium.
- In this leg's first Roadblock, one team member had to take part in sport stacking by quickly arranging cups into three specified formations within seven seconds to receive their next clue.
- After the first Roadblock, teams had to travel to Mugyewon Arts & Cultural Center and prepare kimchi by watching a silent demonstration. Once approved, they had to transfer it to a jar and then bury the closed jar in soil to allow for fermentation. After tasting some kimchi, teams received their next clue directing them to OGN e-Stadium.
- In this season's final Roadblock, the team member who did not perform the previous Roadblock had to play the video game Street Fighter V against one of a number of professional video game players, who included Seon-woo "Infiltration" Lee, and defeat the professional gamer in one round of the game to receive their next clue. After every 10 rounds, the professional gamer received a disadvantage: after 10 rounds, he had to play with only one hand; after 20 rounds, blindfolded; and after 30 rounds, blindfolded and with only one hand.
- After the second Roadblock, teams had to check in at the Pit Stop: the Gavit Some Roof Garden on Sebitseom.

=== Leg 12 (South Korea → United States) ===
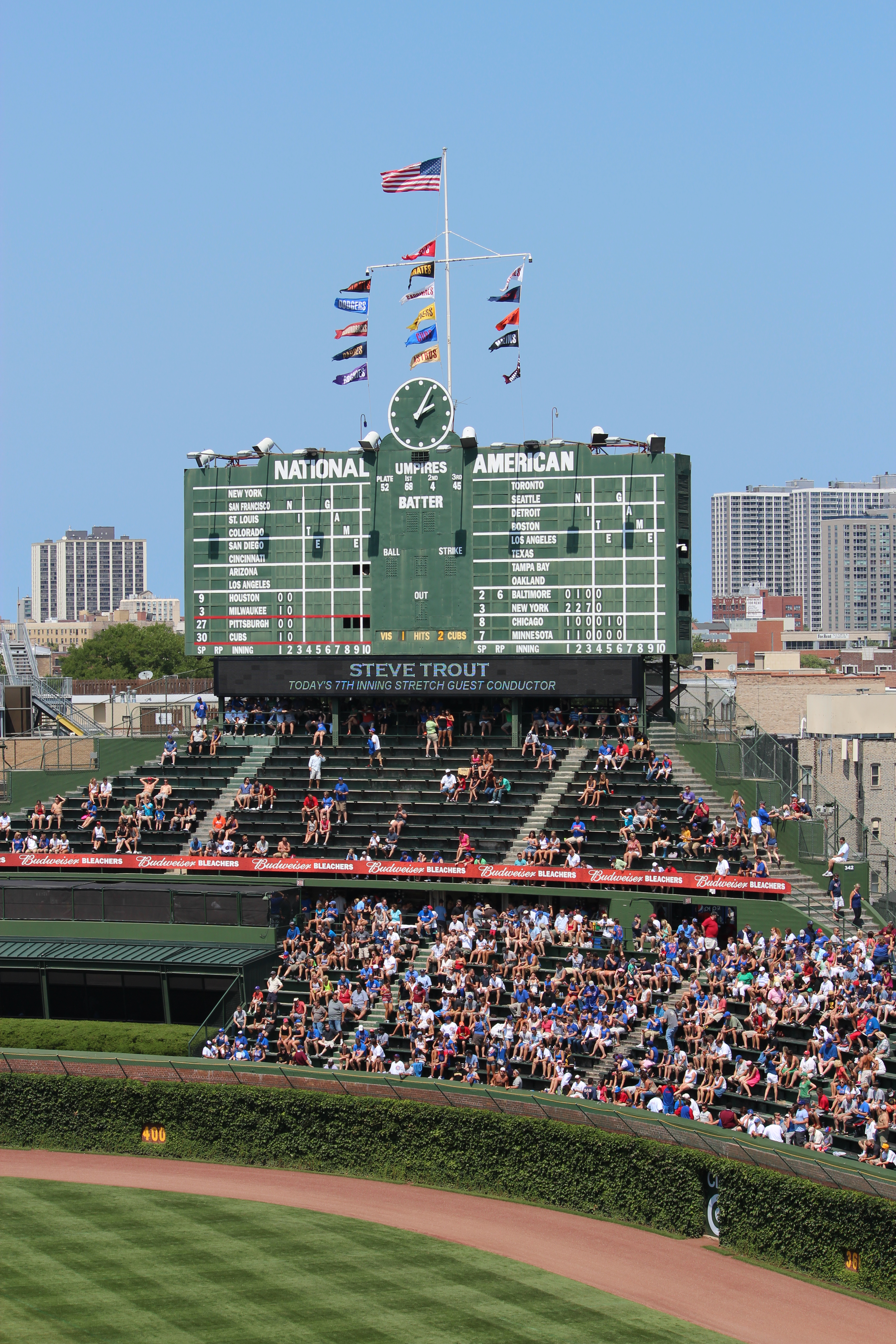
In Chicago, teams visited Wrigley Field, the home of Chicago Cubs, where they had a final task involving its traditional hand-turned scoreboard.

- Episode 12: "We're Going To Victory Lane" (June 1, 2017)
- Prize: US$1,000,000
- Winners: Brooke and Scott
- Runners-up: Tara and Joey
- Third place: London and Logan

Locations

- Seoul (Sebitseom – Gavit Some Roof Garden)
- Seoul → Chicago, Illinois
- Joliet (Chicagoland Speedway)
- Chicago (Monroe Street Station)
- Chicago (Chicago Water Tower, Buckingham Fountain & Wabash Avenue Bridge)
- Chicago (City Hall Rooftop)
- Chicago (Wrigleyville Dogs)
- Chicago (Wrigley Rooftops – 3639 North Sheffield Avenue)
- Chicago (Wrigley Field)
- Chicago (Milton Lee Olive Park)

Episode summary

- At the end of the previous leg, Phil informed teams that they were flying to Chicago, Illinois. Once there, teams had to travel to the Chicagoland Speedway, where one team member had to change one tire on a race car within 40 seconds with a pit crew. Their partner then had to drive one lap around the track within 48 seconds before receiving their next clue at the winner's podium.
- Teams were instructed to search the Monroe Street Station platform for a city worker with their next clue, which contained three riddles that represented three locations within Downtown Chicago: the Chicago Water Tower, Buckingham Fountain, and the Wabash Avenue Bridge. Teams received a postcard at each location that spelled out their next destination when put together: the City Hall Rooftop. There, teams had to locate the rooftop garden, where the city's beekeeper handed them their next clue in exchange for the postcards.
- Teams then had to travel to Wrigleyville Dogs, make ten Chicago-style hot dogs, and deliver them to a group of Chicago Cubs fans at the Wrigley Rooftops of 3639 North Sheffield Avenue. After delivering the hot dogs, season 19 winners Ernie and Cindy handed teams tickets to enter Wrigley Field through the marquee entrance, where they found their next clue.
- For their final memory challenge, one team member had to go inside the press box while the other had to enter the stadium's hand-operated scoreboard, which displayed the eleven Pit Stop cities in alphabetical order. Unable to see the exterior, the racer inside the scoreboard had to install numbered signs in the proper locations on the multi-level structure to indicate their placement at each Pit Stop, guided by their partner via one-way radio. The correct answers were:

Correct answers
City	Country	Leg	Placements		
City	Country	Leg	London & Logan	Tara & Joey	Brooke & Scott
Ålesund	Norway	5	5th	1st	6th
Athens	Greece	8	4th	1st	3rd
Dar es Salaam	Tanzania	4	5th	1st	7th
Hanoi	Vietnam	9	3rd	5th	4th
Lake Como	Italy	6	6th	3rd	5th
Ninh Bình	Vietnam	10	4th	3rd	2nd
Panama City	Panama	1	8th	6th	4th
São Paulo	Brazil	2	8th	7th	6th
Seoul	South Korea	11	2nd	3rd	1st
Venice	Italy	7	5th	3rd	4th
Zanzibar	Tanzania	3	5th	2nd	6th

- Once complete, teams had to go to home plate, where an umpire handed them a worksheet with equations based on their placements throughout the season. The solution provided them a three-digit number corresponding to the section of seats with their final clue, which directed them to the finish line: Milton Lee Olive Park.

Additional note

- At O'Hare International Airport, teams had to search for a woman in a red hat who had their next clue. This segment was unaired.

== Production ==
=== Development and filming ===
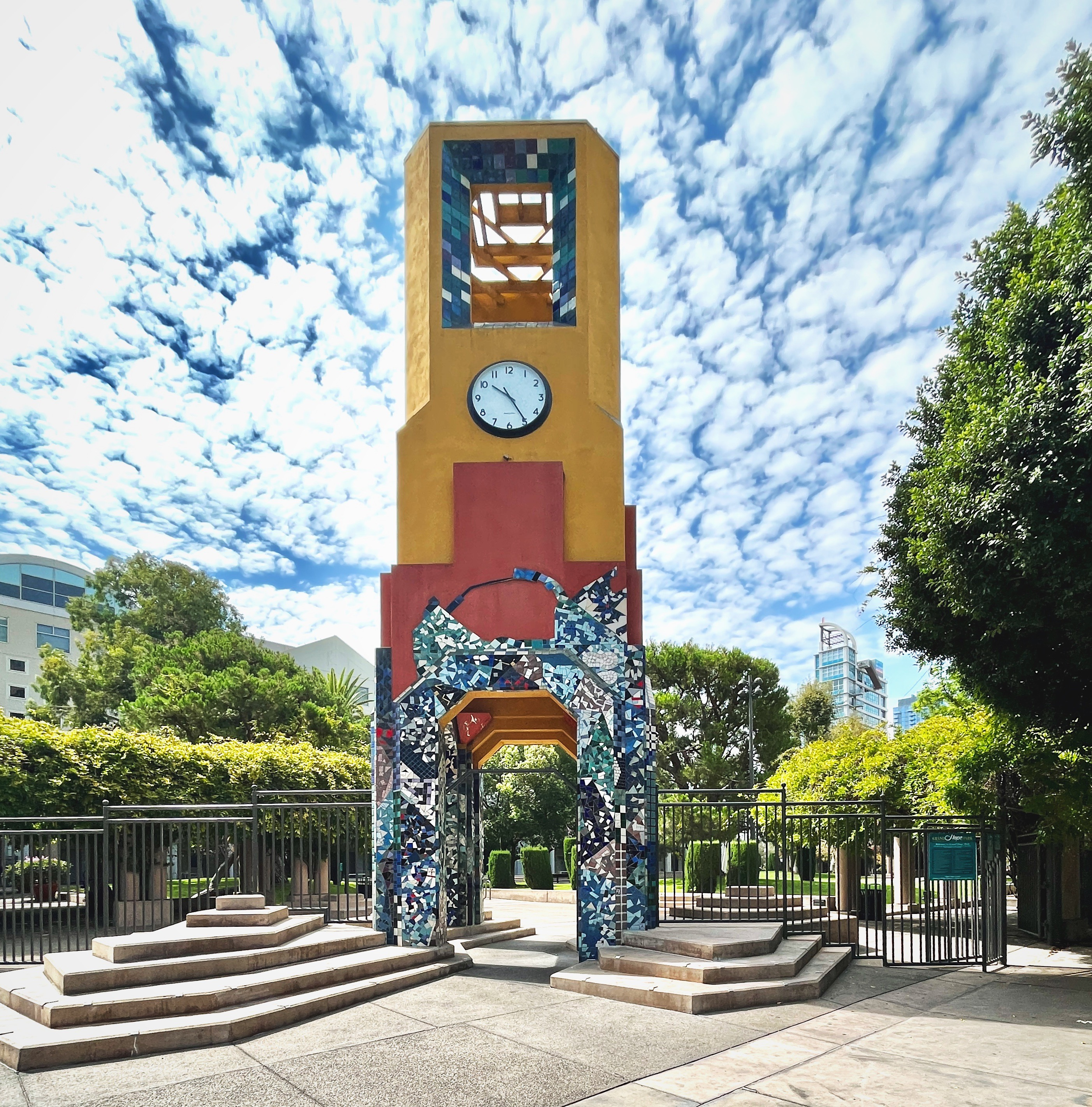
Racers paired up at Grand Hope Park in Downtown Los Angeles before beginning The Amazing Race 29.

Filming began on June 10, 2016, in Los Angeles. By June 12, the show had traveled to Brazil. Filming ended on July 2, 2016, in Chicago. The season included visits to 17 cities across five continents and nine countries over 36,000 miles (58,000 km).

Host Phil Keoghan stated that the twist of casting twenty-two individuals rather than eleven pairs was an idea that the production crew had talked about for some time. They had heard from fans who wanted to apply for the show but were unable to find a partner who could also take time off from work, and the format allowed them to cast twenty-two standout individuals. Despite the similarities of the twenty-sixth season having team members meeting for the first time at the starting line, Keoghan said that the season was not a testing ground for this season.

This season also introduced a few alterations to the show's rules. While the traditional limit on Roadblock performances was still enforced, there was an additional requirement for this season wherein team members could not perform more than four Roadblocks before the ninth leg. Additionally, there was no limit on how many times a team could use the U-Turn this season.

=== Casting ===
Unlike previous seasons, casting calls for this season sought single applicants to apply in addition to pairs of applicants.

== Release ==
=== Broadcast ===
In March 2016, CBS renewed The Amazing Race for the 2016–17 season, but it was left off the fall schedule for the first time since season 12. It was announced in November 2016 that the season would premiere on Friday, April 21, 2017, in its regular Friday time slot after MacGyver finished its season run. On March 10, 2017, CBS announced that it was moving its low-rated new drama Training Day to Saturdays and would move the season premiere up to March 30.

== Reception ==
=== Critical response ===
The Amazing Race 29 received mostly positive reviews. Andy Dehnart of reality blurred wrote that the twist of casting individuals was able to refresh the format of The Amazing Race and the season "delivered a cast that has consistently delivered." Mikey Glazer of TheWrap believed that the format of this season worked because "unlike previous seasons where the two-person teams often suffered from one clunker team member — camouflaged in the edit under proverbial team nicknames like 'the frat boys' or 'the dancers' — each of the 22 racers on this season was identifiable, memorable and got a full story arc." Lincee Ray of Entertainment Weekly praised how this format was able to deliver "highly entertaining" teams like Brooke and Scott due to their love/hate relationship. Conversely, Ken Tucker of Yahoo! called this season "dire" as the format led to teams that either got along well or despised each other and said that he wasn't rooting for anyone to win. In 2024, Rhenn Taguiam of Game Rant ranked this season 21st out of 36.

=== Ratings ===
U.S. Nielsen ratings

Viewership and ratings per episode of The Amazing Race 29
No.	Title	Air date	Rating/share (18–49)	Viewers (millions)	DVR (18–49)	DVR viewers (millions)	Total (18–49)	Total viewers (millions)	Ref.
1	"We're Coming For You, Phil!"	March 30, 2017	0.9/3	4.30	0.7	2.44	1.6	6.73	
2	"Scared Spitless"	April 6, 2017	0.9/4	3.99	0.6	2.47	1.5	6.46	
3	"Bucket List Type Stuff"	April 13, 2017	0.8/3	4.18	0.7	2.40	1.5	6.51	
4	"Another One Bites The Dust"	April 20, 2017	0.9/4	4.40	0.6	2.08	1.5	6.48	
5	"Have Faith in Me, Broski"	April 20, 2017	0.8/3	3.84	0.6	2.29	1.4	6.13	
6	"Double U-Turn Ahead"	April 27, 2017	0.7/3	3.80	—N/a	—N/a	—N/a	—N/a	
7	"Have Fun and Get It Done"	May 4, 2017	0.9/4	4.01	0.6	2.36	1.5	6.37	
8	"Good Job, Donkey"	May 11, 2017	0.9/3	4.04	0.7	2.51	1.6	6.56	
9	"I Thought We Were Playing It Nice"	May 18, 2017	0.9/4	4.42	0.6	1.90	1.5	6.32	
10	"Riding a Bike Is Like Riding a Bike"	May 18, 2017	0.8/3	3.86	0.6	1.94	1.4	5.80	
11	"As Easy As Stacking Cups"	May 25, 2017	0.6/3	3.63	0.8	2.36	1.4	5.99	
12	"We're Going To Victory Lane"	June 1, 2017	0.8/3	3.91	0.6	2.14	1.4	6.05	

Canadian ratings

Canadian broadcaster CTV also aired The Amazing Race on Thursdays.

Canadian DVR ratings are included in Numeris's count.

No.	Air date	Episode	Viewers (millions)	Rank (Week)	Ref
1	March 30, 2017	"We're Coming For You, Phil!"	1.38	13	
2	April 6, 2017	"Scared Spitless"	1.26	17	
3	April 13, 2017	"Bucket List Type Stuff"	1.29	11	
4	April 20, 2017	"Another One Bites The Dust"	1.33	10	
5	April 20, 2017	"Have Faith in Me, Broski"	1.33	10	
6	April 27, 2017	"Double U-Turn Ahead"	1.32	11	
7	May 4, 2017	"Have Fun and Get It Done"	1.45	9	
8	May 11, 2017	"Good Job, Donkey"	1.37	17	
9	May 18, 2017	"I Thought We Were Playing It Nice"	1.34	9	
10	May 18, 2017	"Riding a Bike Is Like Riding a Bike"	1.34	9	
11	May 25, 2017	"As Easy As Stacking Cups"	1.15	8	
12	June 1, 2017	"We're Going To Victory Lane"	1.47	4	

== Works cited ==
- Castro, Adam-Troy (2006). My Ox Is Broken!. BenBella Books. ISBN 978-1-932100-91-4.
