= Sebitseom =

Artificial islands in South Korea

Some Sevit
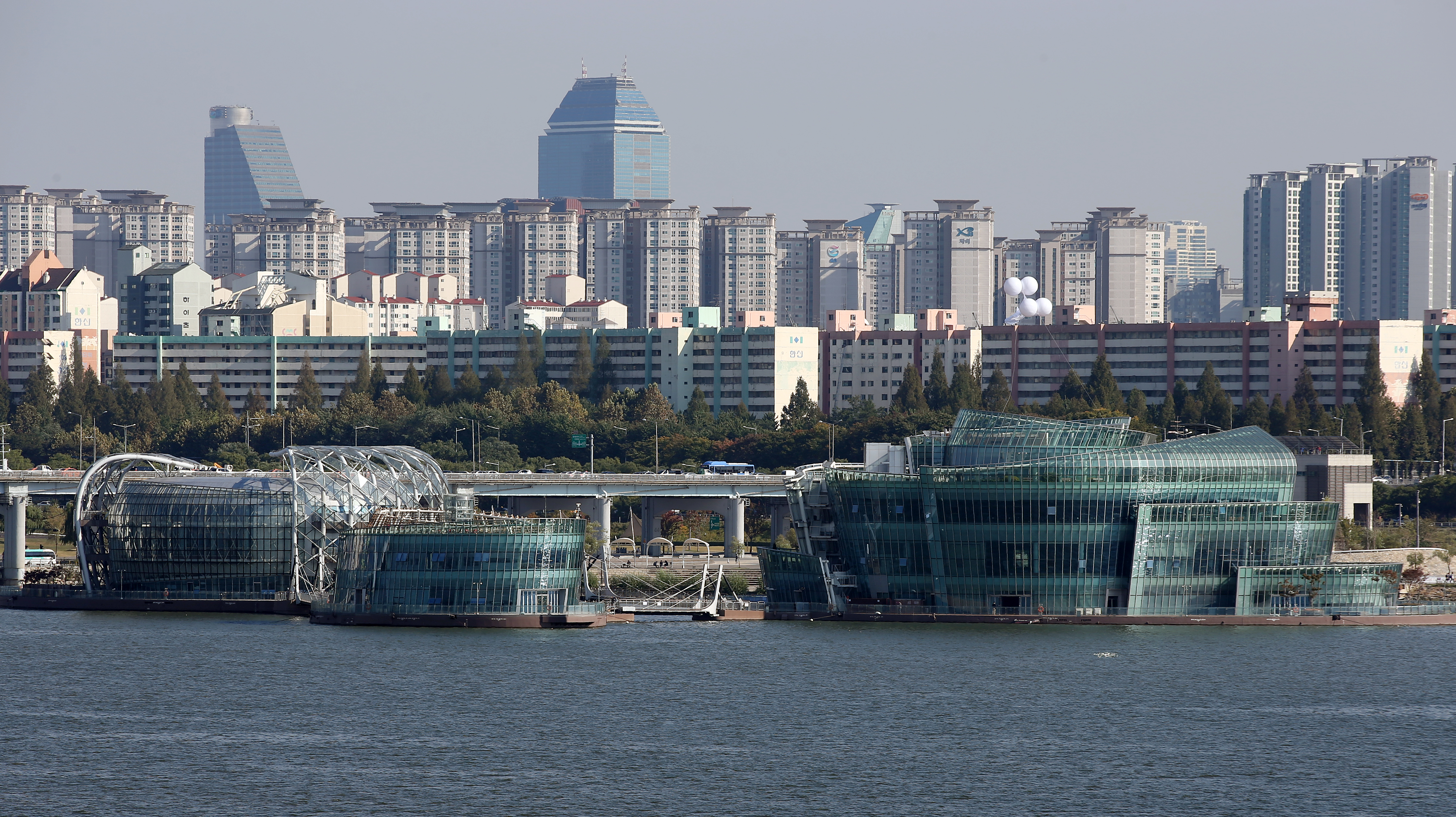
- View of the islands' facilities from the opposite bank of the river (2014)
- Interactive map of Some Sevit

Geography
- Location: 06500 2085-14, Olympic-daero, Seocho-gu, Seoul
- Coordinates: 37°30′44″N 126°59′42.9″E

Additional information
- Official website: www.somesevit.com/en/index.do (in English)

Korean name
- Hangul: 세빛섬
- RR: Sebitseom
- MR: Sebissŏm

Sebitseom (Korean: 세빛섬) in Korean, is officially known as Some Sevit and sometimes known as the Sebit islets, are artificial islands in the Han River in Seoul, South Korea. It is the world's first floating structure built on a buoy that can stay afloat on water. It was built at the suggestion of Kim Eun-sung (citizen of Seoul) in 2006. Seoul made this island by Build-Transfer-Operate (BTO). It has 3 islands: Gavit (가빛; Gabit), Chavit (채빛; Chaebit), and Solvit (솔빛; Solbit). Yevit (예빛; Yebit) is part of Sebitseom, but is not an island itself, but rather, it's an on-land multimedia art gallery complementing the three floating islands.

== Background ==
Sebitseom, covering a combined area of 10,421 m^{2} (Gavit: 4,881 m^{2}, Chavit: 3,477 m^{2}, Solvit: 1,271 m^{2}, Yevit: 792 m^{2}), was set to open as a private equity consortium in September 2011 containing convention halls and performance and display areas, along with commercial areas (e.g. restaurant, cafés, etc.), but due to managerial conflicts, the plan was indefinitely postponed. In September 2009, however, roughly US$86 million were invested into Sebitseom (then-named Flo Some or 플로섬) to build the lobbies, decks, and rooftops of each island. As of May 2011, 47% of Some Sevit is owned by Hyosung Group; 10% is owned by Jinheung Company, an affiliate of Hyosung Group; and 29% is owned by SH Construction. Some Sevit has been managed and operated by a manufacturing firm named CR101. Monthly expenses on upkeep and rentals reach around US$970,000 or an annual expense of roughly $11.6 million. The projected expenses is estimated to be over $268 million (unadjusted for inflation) during the next 25 years.

== History ==
- 2006 November: Suggestion to create artificial islands on Han River received
- 2009 November: Yevit completed construction (the media art gallery)
- 2011 April: Sebitseom completed construction and placed into Han River
- 2011 May 21: Outside viewing areas opened
- 2014 May: Opening of Gavit
- 2014 July: Opening of Chavit
- 2014 November: Inaugural opening of Some Sevit to the public

=== Controversy ===
The luxury brand Fendi held a fashion show on June 3, 2011, unveiling its Fall and Winter collection, amid heavy protests from animal rights activists. After it was announced that the show would focus on fur items, the Seoul government demanded fur to be excluded from the show "in response to protests from anti-fur activists about this use of a public venue." In response to government demands, Fendi cited the lack of time left until the show (there were only weeks left before the show) and the time and money they had already spent in preparation. However, Fendi decided to diminish the show's focus on fur by introducing a greater variety of items, such as shoes, bags, and other accessories. Earlier in the year, a popular SBS TV program, "TV Animal Farm," aired an episode bringing awareness to the fur industry and to the living conditions of animals farmed for fur. It depicted actual footage of the process of collecting fur from live animals, shocking viewers, which may have increased the scale of the protests against the fashion show.

== Characteristic of each island ==
Some Sevit Island Night View

- Gavit (가빛섬, Island 1, Vista): It is an island of performing arts. It contains a performance hall and moonlight trail.
- Chavit (채빛섬, Island 2, Viva): It is the first island among these 3 islands. It has culture experience facilities. It is an island of entertainment.
- Solvit (솔빛섬, Island 3, Terra): It is an island of water leisure. There is water leisure facilities.
- Yevit (예빛섬, Media Art Gallery): It is also a floating structure along with the three floating islands. This place is where the office of Some Sevit Island and Golden Blue Marina is situated.

== In popular culture ==
Sebitseom has been featured in Korean dramas including She Was Pretty Athena: Goddess of War. The islets were featured in the blockbuster movie Avengers: Age of Ultron as the site of laboratories of Dr. Helen Cho. The final runway show from cycle 21 of America's Next Top Model was set near the islets. The islets were also used as the site of a pit stop during the eleventh episode of The Amazing Race 29.
