= Palazzo Soranzo =

Coordinates: 45.4378°N 12.3304°E

The Palazzo Soranzo is composed of two adjacent Gothic palaces or palazzi, located facing Campo San Polo, in the sestiere San Polo of Venice, Italy. There is a distinct Palazzo Soranzo Piovene on the Grand Canal of Venice.

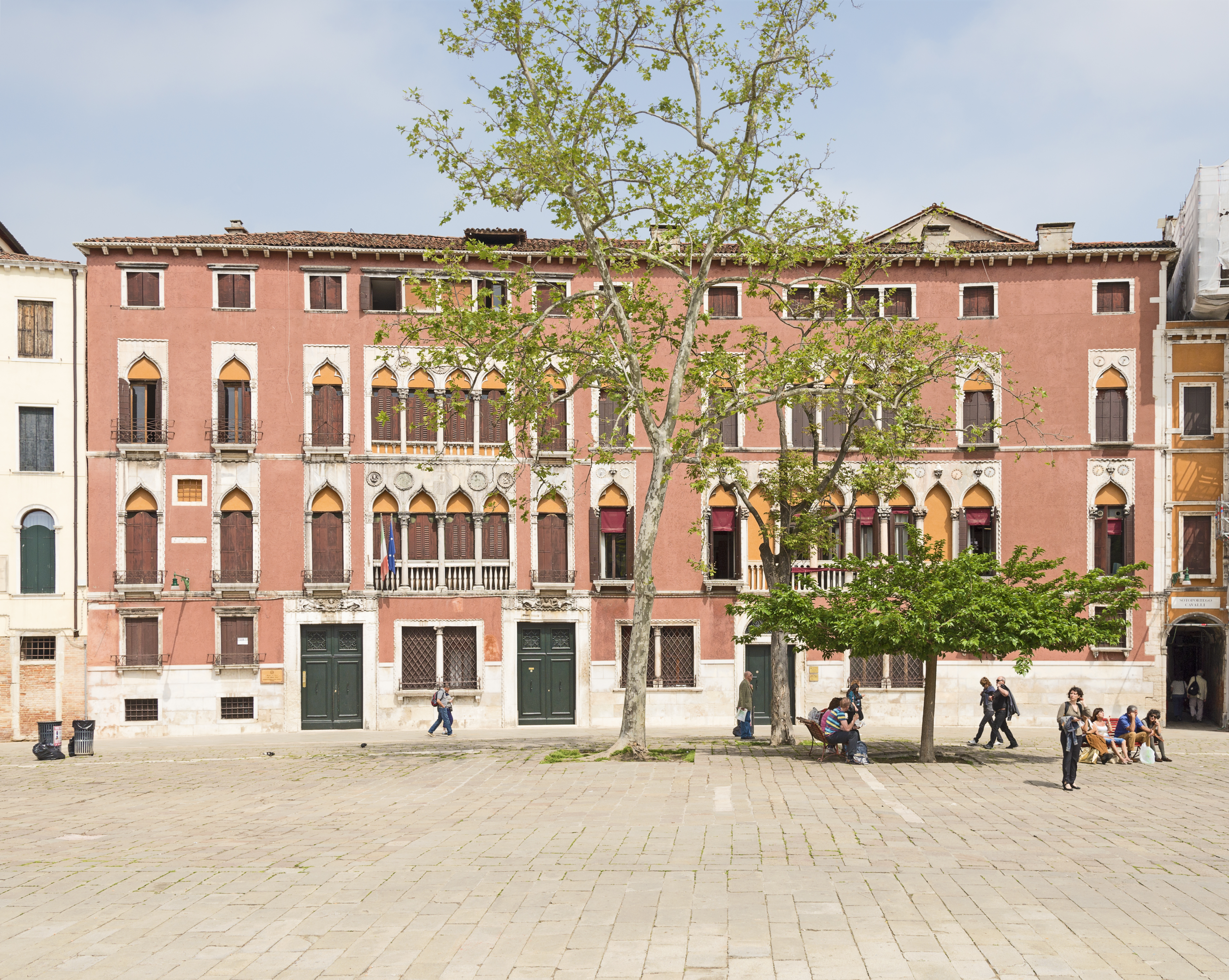
Facade of Palazzo Soranzo; the left of the photo is the old 14th-century palace, the right is from the 15th century.

Originally the facade of the palaces faced a canal, the Rio Sant'Antonio, which was paved over in 1761. Originally, small bridges provided access to the campo. The campo had been paved by 1493. The oldest part of the complex dates to the mid-1300s. The newer building, with the broad 8 adjacent windows in piano nobile, was erected in the 15th century. It was once decorated with frescoes by Giorgione.

The Soranzo family was a prominent Venetian noble family. One of the members, Giovanni Soranzo, was elected Doge in 1312 and served till 1328. He had been an admiral who defeated the Genoese at Kaffa in the Crimea. Most of the original paintings and removable decoration were sold over the centuries. The palace is now privately owned, and subdivided into apartments and offices.
