= Matt Ladley =

American snowboarder (born 1991)

Personal information
- Born: Matthew Ladley; May 17, 1991 (age 35) Steamboat Springs, Colorado, U.S.
Medal record
Men's Snowboarding
Representing the United States
Winter X Games
Gold medal – first place	2016 Aspen	SuperPipe
Silver medal – second place	2017 Aspen	SuperPipe

Matthew Ladley (born May 17, 1991) is an American snowboarder who won the gold medal in the superpipe at Winter X Games XX. He competed on the 29th season of The Amazing Race and finished in fourth place.
