= Grand Hope Park =

Park in Los Angeles, California, U.S.

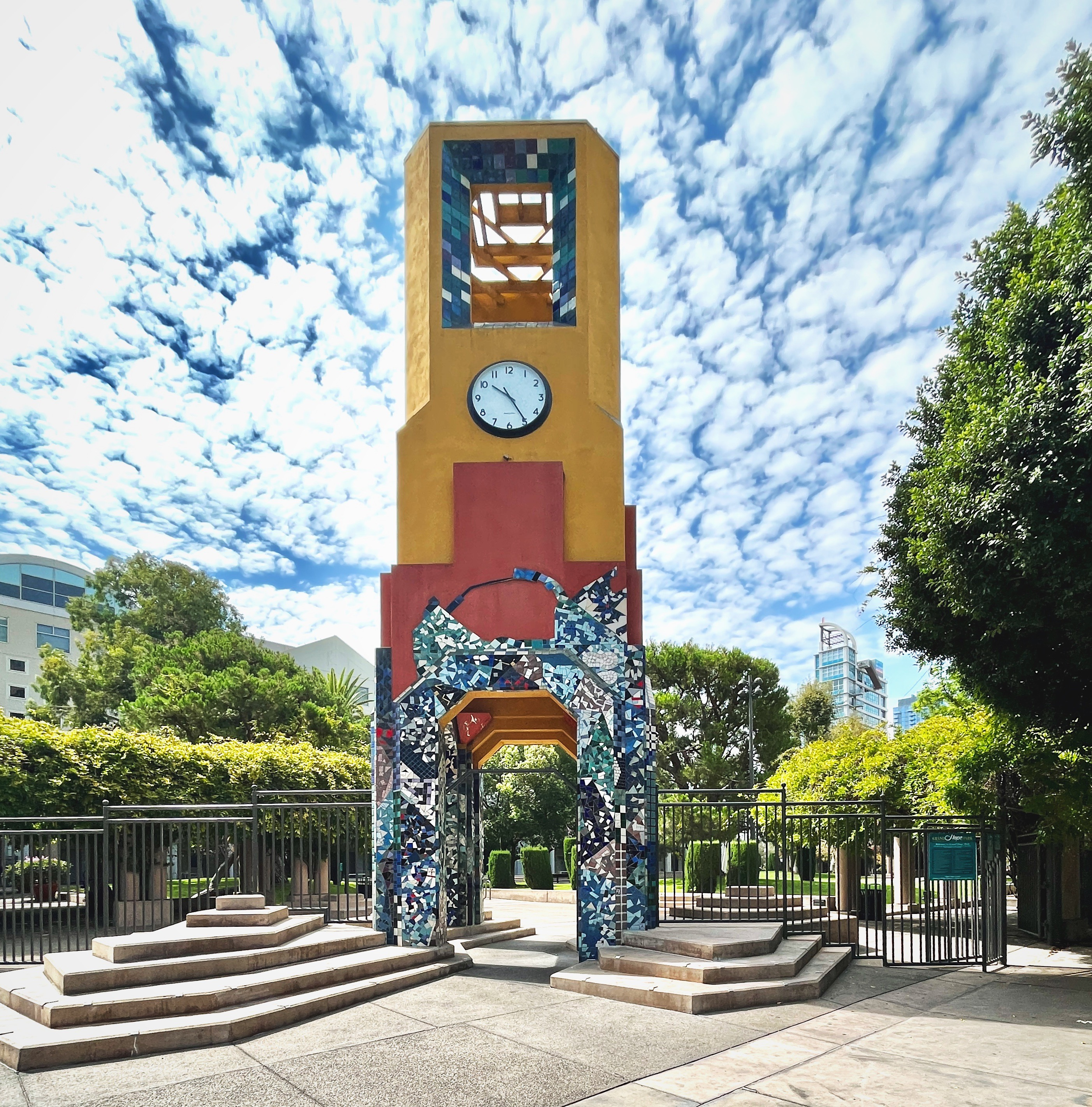
- Grand Hope Park, July 2022
- Interactive map of Grand Hope Park
- Type: Urban park
- Location: Los Angeles, California, United States
- Coordinates: 34°2′40.2″N 118°15′37.8″W
- Area: 2.5 acres (1.0 ha)
- Created: 1993
- Designer: Lawrence Halprin
- Owner: City of Los Angeles Department of Recreation and Parks
- Operator: Los Angeles Conservancy
- Public transit: 7th Street/Metro Center

Grand Hope Park is a 2.5-acre (1.0 ha) urban park in the South Park District of Downtown Los Angeles, California.

== History ==
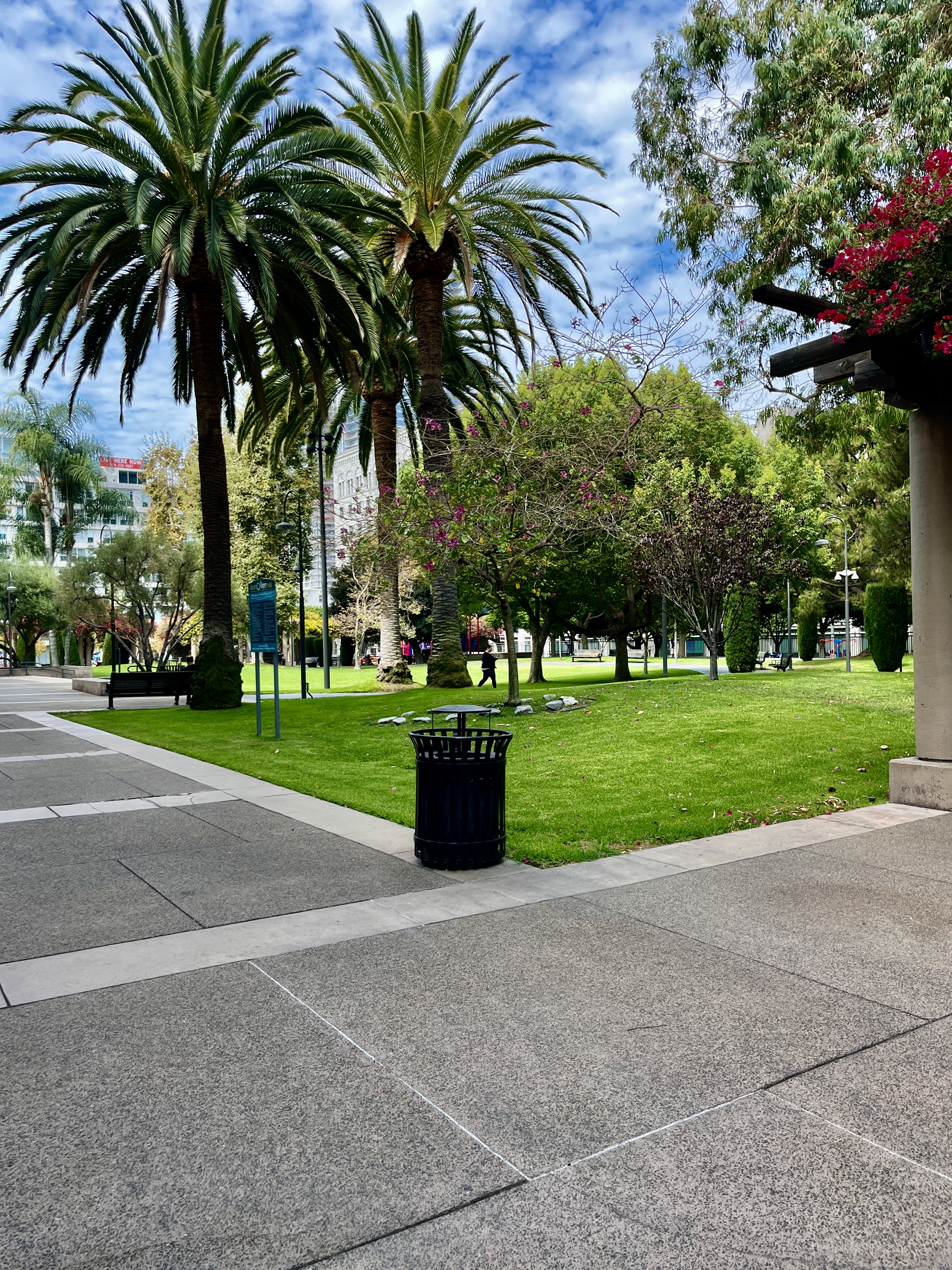
Grand Hope Park, July 2022

Plans to construct a new park in Downtown Los Angeles were set in motion in early 1975. Original plans sought to build a man-made lake, but rising land costs delayed the project. By 1989, a new plot of land was selected. The project was commissioned by the Los Angeles Redevelopment Agency as the final landscape for the Los Angeles Open Space Network. Ground breaking for the park took place on July 18, 1989, and construction lasted until 1993. The park was designed by Lawrence Halprin with The Jerde Partnership architects.

After its creation, Grand Hope Park became the first new park built in Downtown Los Angeles since 1870, when Pershing Square was built. Grand Hope Park became the last downtown Los Angeles landscape designed by Halprin. The park is also the final landscape along the Los Angeles Open Space Network. Other sites in the network are Wells Fargo Center, Bunker Hill Steps, and the Central Library's Maguire Gardens.

Grand Hope Park appeared in the premiere of The Amazing Race 29 as the starting point for the season's race around the world.

== Features ==
Grand Hope Park is located on the Los Angeles campus of the Fashion Institute of Design & Merchandising. The park was designed as a collection of "outdoor rooms" with the purpose of "bringing functional art and nature to an urban setting." Its built in elements are diverse enough to form a mixed metaphor due to its mixture of greenery (including cypress, willow, feather and fan palm, pine, jacaranda and sycamore). It consists of decorative sidewalks, two fountains, a clock tower, pergolas, a children's playground, and displays of various artists' works. The artwork in the park was contributed from Lita Albuquerque, Adrian Saxe, Raul Guerrero, Gwynn Murrill, Tony Berlant, and Ralph McIntosh. The mosaic adorned clock tower at the park's entrance was designed by Halprin with musical compositions from John Carter, Michael McNabb, and Ushio Torikai used to mark each hour.

== See also ==
- List of parks in Los Angeles
