= Campo San Polo =

Square in Venice, Italy

Coordinates: 45°26′15.00″N 12°19′47.64″E

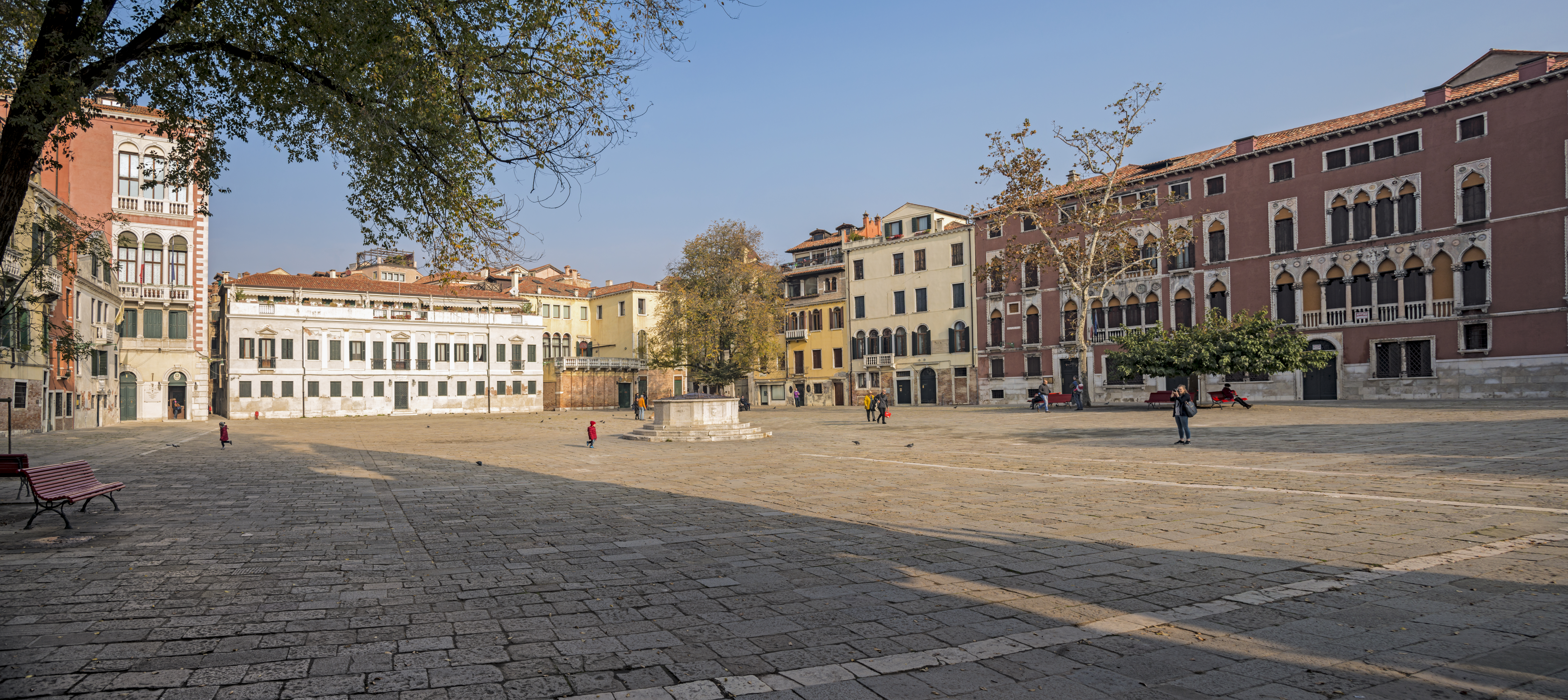
Campo San Polo

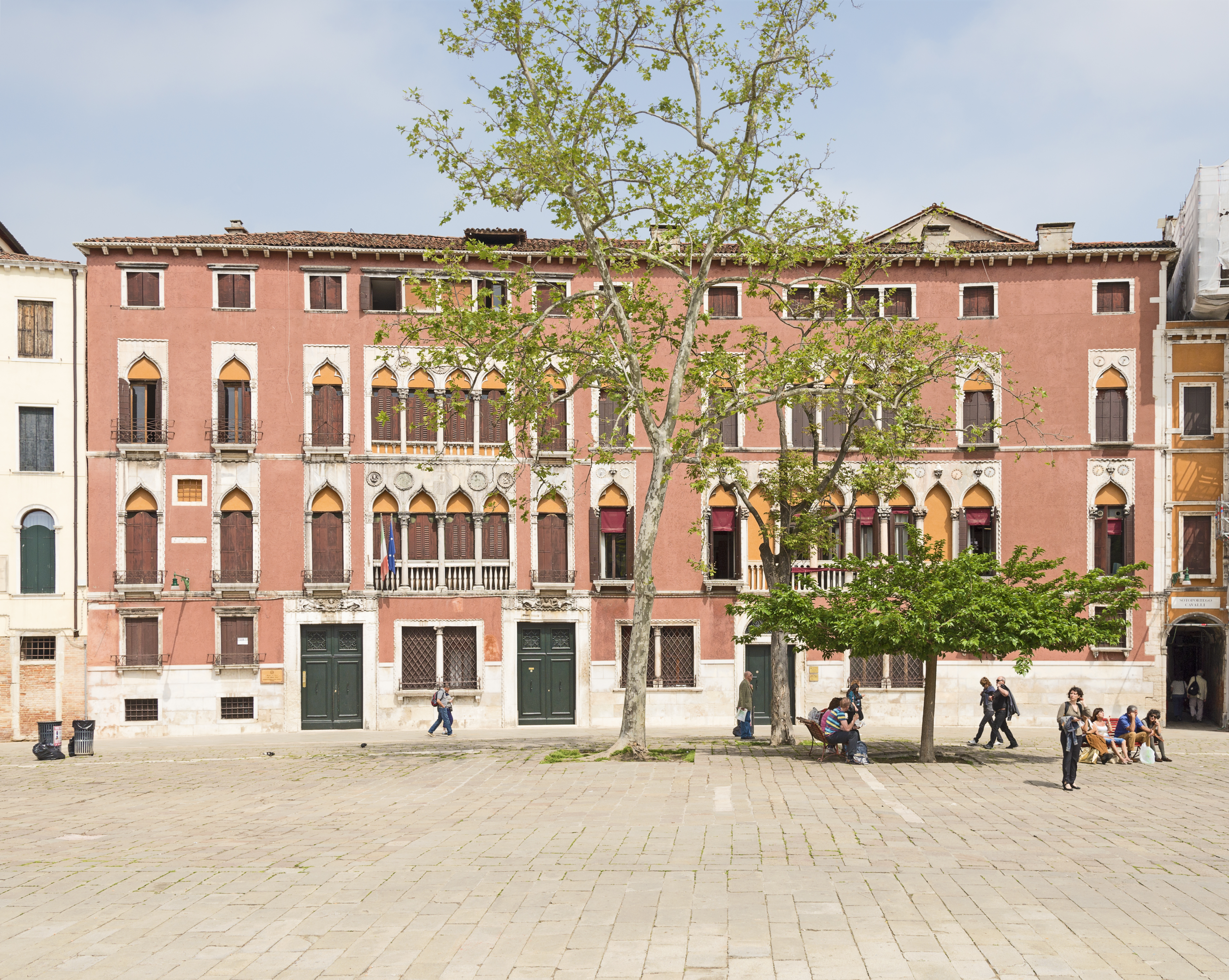
Facade of Palazzo Soranzo in Campo San Polo

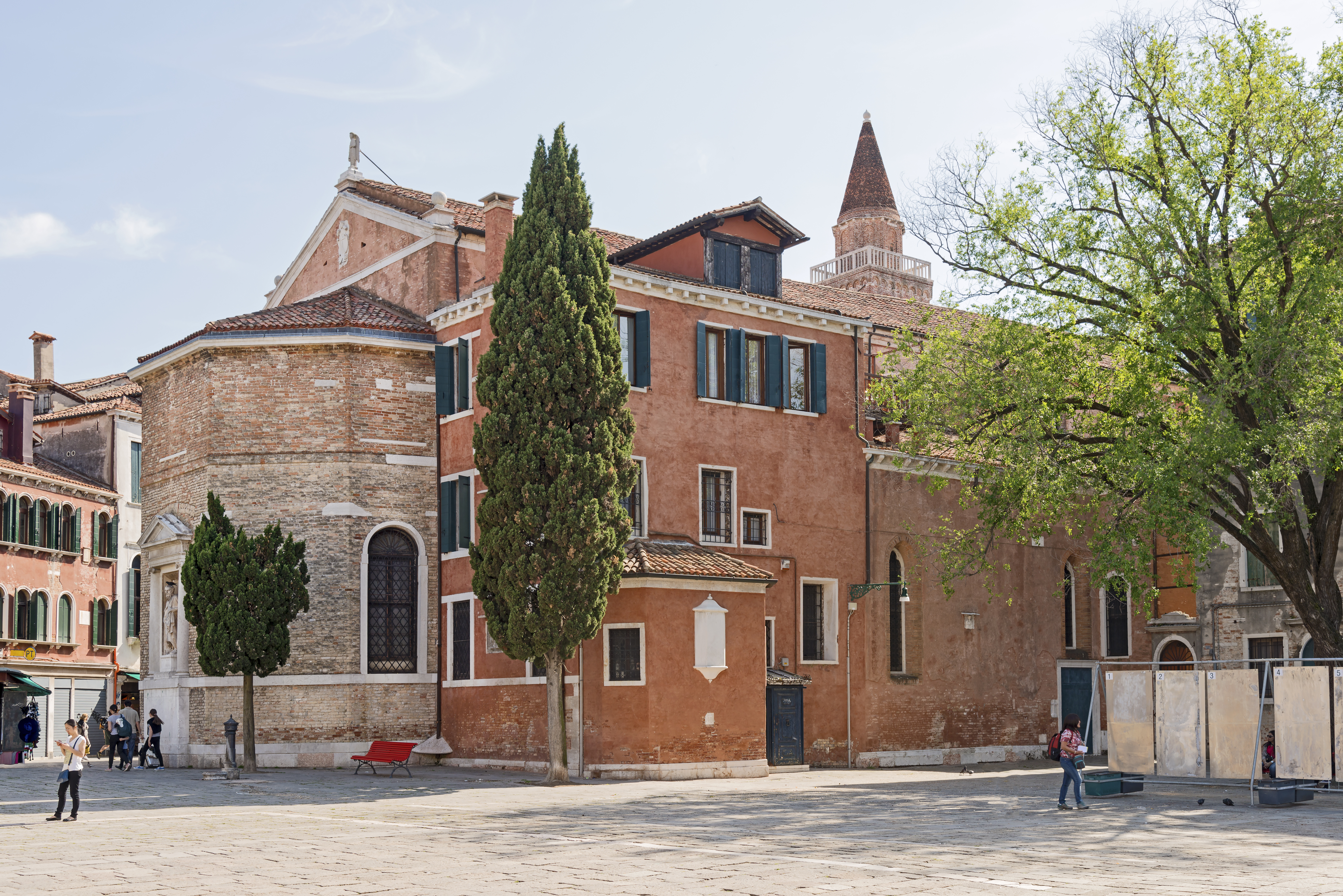
Apse of Chiesa di San Polo

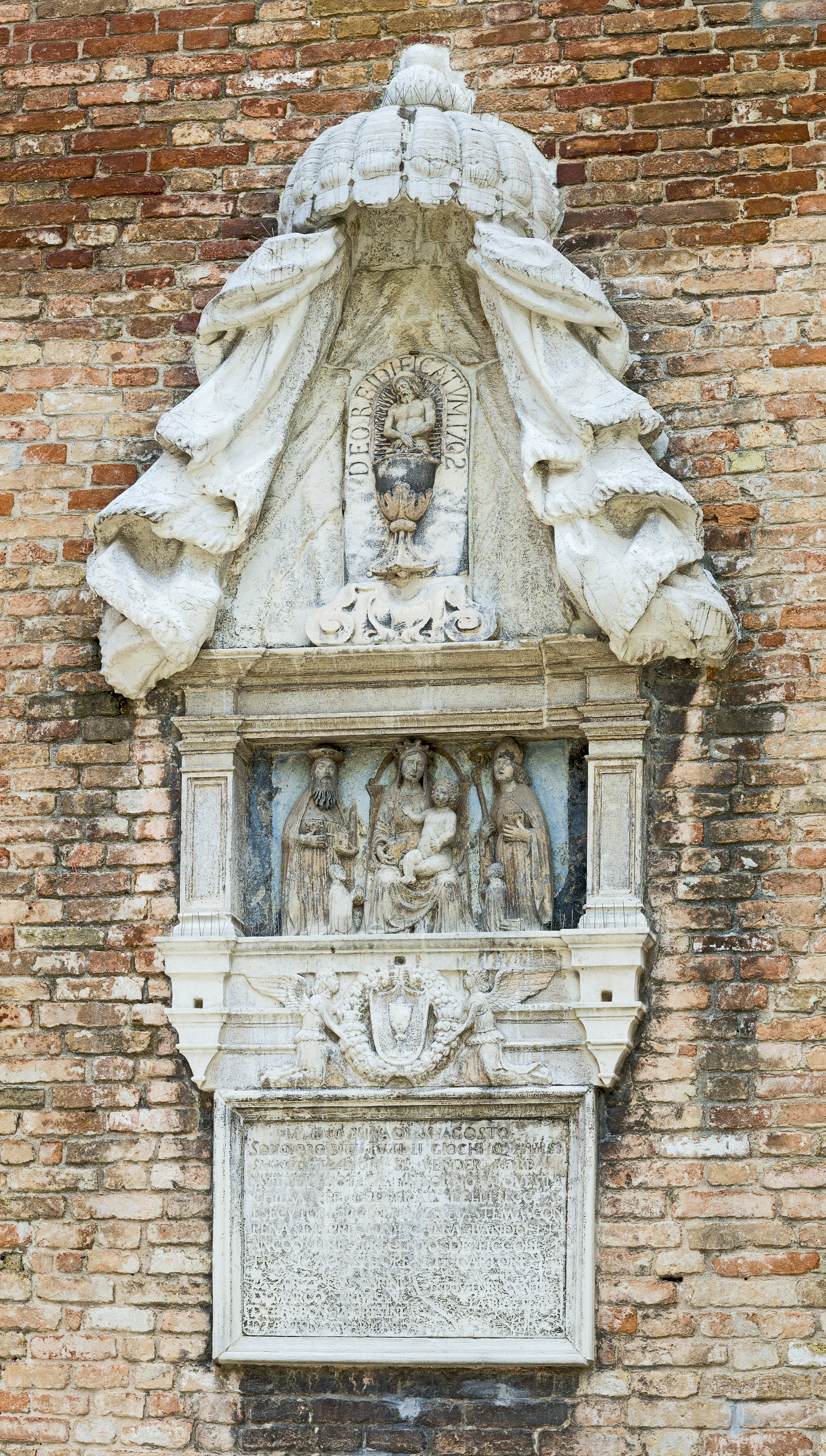
The plate of the prohibition of games.

The Campo San Polo is the largest campo in Venice, Italy, the second largest Venetian public square after the Piazza San Marco. It is located in the Sestiere San Polo.

Originally dedicated to grazing and agriculture, in 1493 it was entirely paved, a well (one of the few fountains to be found in Venice) being placed in the middle. It was subsequently used as the scene of many a bullfight, mass sermons and masked balls. After the 17th century the poor's market was moved here from Piazza San Marco.

It remains to this day one of the most popular Carnival venues and is also used for open-air concerts and screenings during the Venice Film Festival.

Lorenzino de' Medici was assassinated here in 1548.

Facing the church are the following buildings:

- Church of San Polo
- Palazzo Tiepolo
- Palazzo Soranzo
- Palazzo Donà Brusa
- Palazzo Corner Mocenigo
