= List of landmarks in Stone Town =

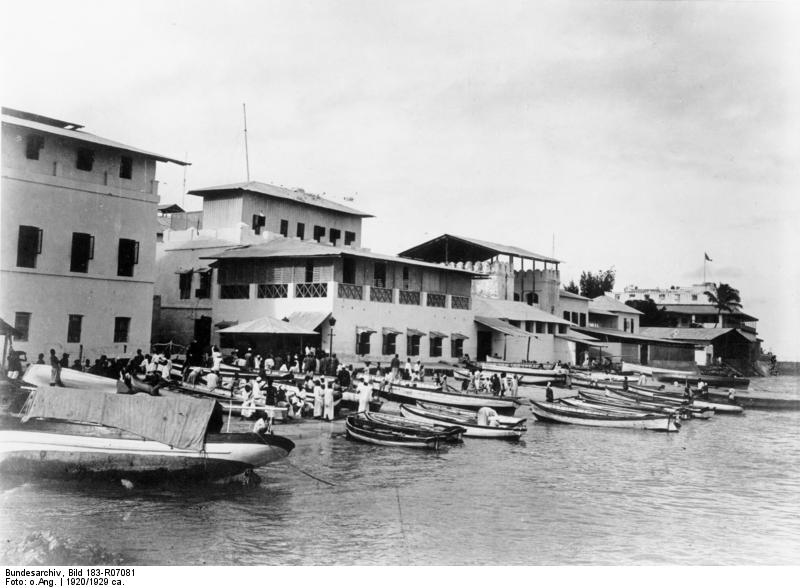
Stone Town Harbor in 1919.

Stone Town also known as Mji Mkongwe is the old part of the Zanzibar City. The Town was the capital of the Sultanate of Zanzibar and at one point the capital of the Sultanate of Muscat and Oman. The town's architecture and cultural composition is a mixture of centuries of various cultures that have inhabited the island such as the Arabs, Persians, Indias and Europeans. The site was declared a UNESCO world heritage site in 2000 and is a major tourist site in the nation of Tanzania.

== Historic Buildings ==
Name	Image	Description	Reference
The Old Fort		The fort is adjacent to the House of Wonders, and is a heavy stone fortress that was built in the 17th century by the Omanis to protect the regime from a Portuguese invasion. It has a roughly square shape; the internal courtyard is now a cultural centre.	
House of Wonders		The House of Wonders (also known as "Beit-al-Ajaib"), lies at the edge of the seafront, and is the most recognizable landmarks of Stone Town. It was built in 1883 and restored after the Anglo-Zanzibar War of 1896. The house was primarily the Sultan's residence and was the first building in Zanzibar to have electricity as well as the first building in East Africa to have a lift. It became the seat of the Afro-Shirazi Party after the revolution and was converted into a museum.	
The Old Dispensary		The Old Dispensary was built from 1887 to 1894 by wealthy local Indians to serve as a charity hospital for the poor but was later used as a dispensary. The building is one of the highly decorated buildings on the Island and the architecture stems from the cultural pot that existed on the island. After falling into decay in the 1970s and 1980s, the building was accurately restored by the Aga Khan Trust for Culture.	
Sultan's Palace		The Sultan's Palace (also known as "Beit el-Sahel"), was another palace that housed the royal family built in the late 19th century. Currently the palace has been converted into a museum and displays the daily life of the Zanzibari royal family.	
The Anglican Cathedral of Christ		The Church of Christ was built in the heart of Stone Town by Bishop Edward Steere at the site of the former slave market. The church was deliberately built to celebrate the end of slavery and the church's altar is built upon the site where the main whipping post of the market used to be. A monument to the slaves, as well as a museum on the history of slavery, are besides the church.	
Roman Catholic Cathedral of St. Joseph		The Church was built by French missionaries between 1893 and 1898. The design of the church was based on that of the Marseille Cathedral. Its twin masts are its most recognizable feature and can be seen from a distance when sailing into Stone Town. The church is still operational today and holds regular mass on Sundays.	
Hamamni Persian Baths		The word "Hamamni" means "the place of the baths" and the Baths were built between 1870 and 1888 for sultan Barghash bin Said for use as public baths, and maintained this function until 1920. They are referred to as "Persian" because their construction was commissioned to Shirazi architects. The baths were usually for the wealthy and attracted people from all different ethnic groups. The baths are not operational anymore and most of the structures that used to be restaurants and cafes adjacent to the baths have become residential complexes.	
Malindi Mosque		Built by Sunni Arabs in the 15th century, the Malindi mosque is one of the oldest mosques on the island. The mosque has some unusual architectural features, including a cone-shaped minaret and a square platform where the minaret stands on. There are only 2 other mosques with similar architecture in East Africa	
Tippu Tip's House		The home of the Islands most powerful merchant and slave trader Tippu Tip. Tippu Tip's house remained a private residence up until the Zanzibar Revolution and was then converted into a block of flats. The house is not open to the public despite it being declared a tourist attraction.	
David Livingstone's House		Before David Livingstone began his expedition into the interior of Tanganyika he spent time preparing for his expedition in Zanzibar. His house was initially built as a small palace for Sultan Majid bin Said, however was then given to European missionaries.	

== Other Iconic Landmarks ==
Name	Image	Description	Reference
Forodhani Gardens		The Gardens are located along the Stone Town Sea wall in front of the Old Fort and is a popular place for gathering come dusk. The Park quickly becomes crowded with locals and tourists trying to enjoy Zanzibari cuisine. The Park was recently rehabilitated as part of the Aga Khan Trust for Culture project.	
Darajani Market		The Darajani market runs along the entire Darajani Road on the Island and is the main market for food on the Island. The Market was built in 1904 and is primarily for obtaining fresh foods, however recently many Consumer electronic shops have risen. The market still has a similar atmosphere to the Bazaars that existed on the island for centuries.	
Prison Island		Prison Island (more accurately called Changuu island) used to be a prison where uncooperative or stubborn slaves were sent for treatment. The Island was in-inhabitted but later with the British arrival became a prison site to quarantine people with yellow fever. The government converted all quarantine buildings into guest houses and the island is home to Giant Aldabra tortoises, brought to the island from Seychelles.	

== See also ==
- List of World Heritage Sites in Tanzania
