= Tippu Tip's House =

Historical building in Stone Town, Zanzibar, Tanzania

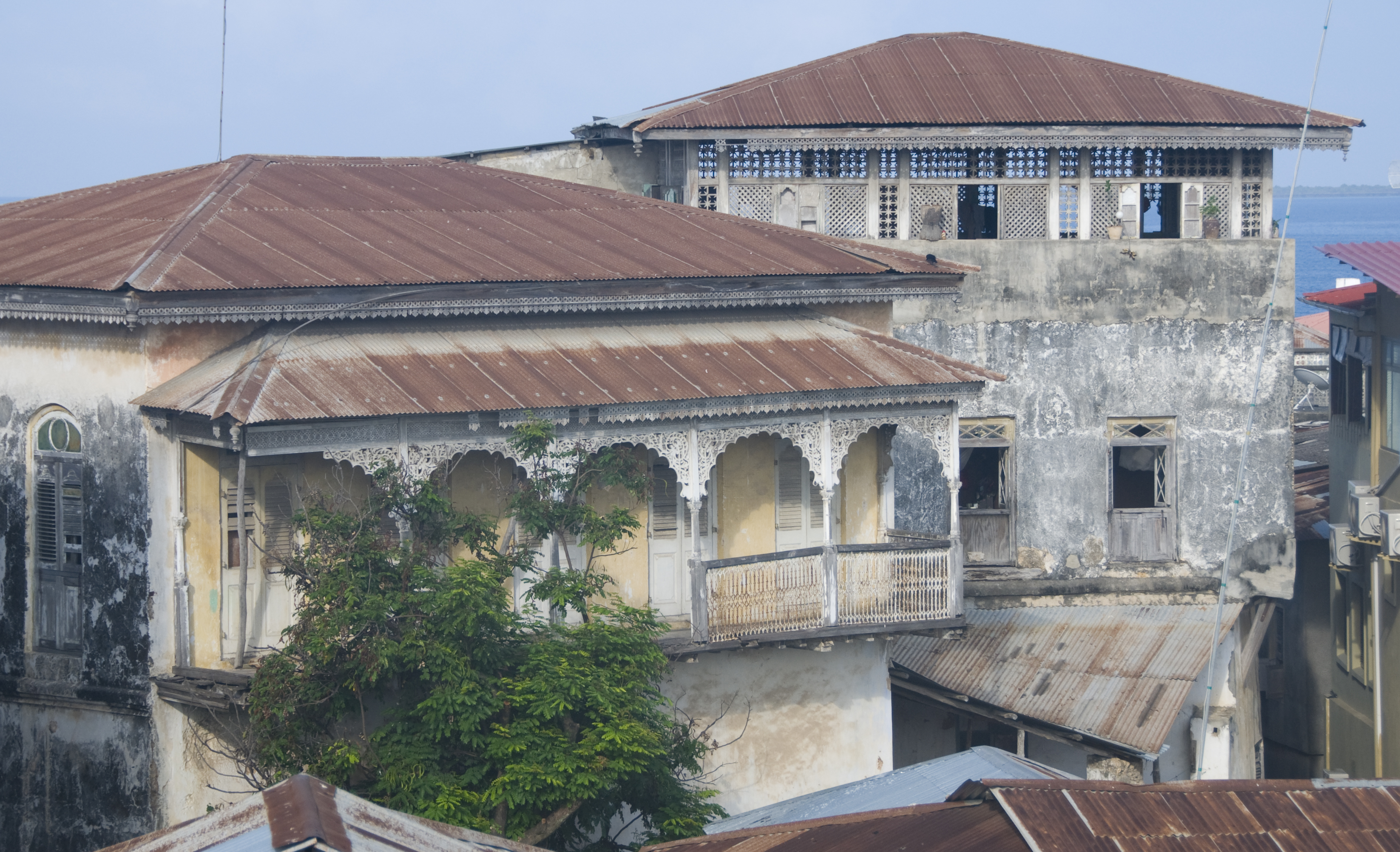
- Tippu Tip's House

- Location within Tanzania

General information
- Location: Stone Town, Zanzibar, Tanzania
- Coordinates: 6.1640°S 39.1870°E

Tippu Tip's House is a historical building in Stone Town, Zanzibar, located in Suicide Alley in the Shangani ward near the Africa House Hotel and Serena Inn, about 15–25 minute walking time from the Old Fort and Forodhani Gardens. It is the house where the powerful merchant and slave trader Tippu Tip (1837–1905) lived. The building was a private residence until the Zanzibar Revolution and was later converted into a block of flats.

Despite being a tourist attraction, it is not formally open to visitors, and it is in such a state of decay that it has been described as "the most magnificent squat in all of Africa". The large decorated carved wooden door, as well as the black and white marble steps, still testify the great wealth of the historical owner of the house.
