= Old Dispensary =

Old Dispensary or the Old Dispensary may refer to:

- Old Dispensary (Zanzibar)
- Old Dispensary (London), a historic building in Stratford, London
