= National Museum of Tanzania =

Consortium of five Tanzanian museums

Coordinates: 6.8131°S 39.2938°E

The National Museum of Tanzania
- Makumbusho ya Taifa
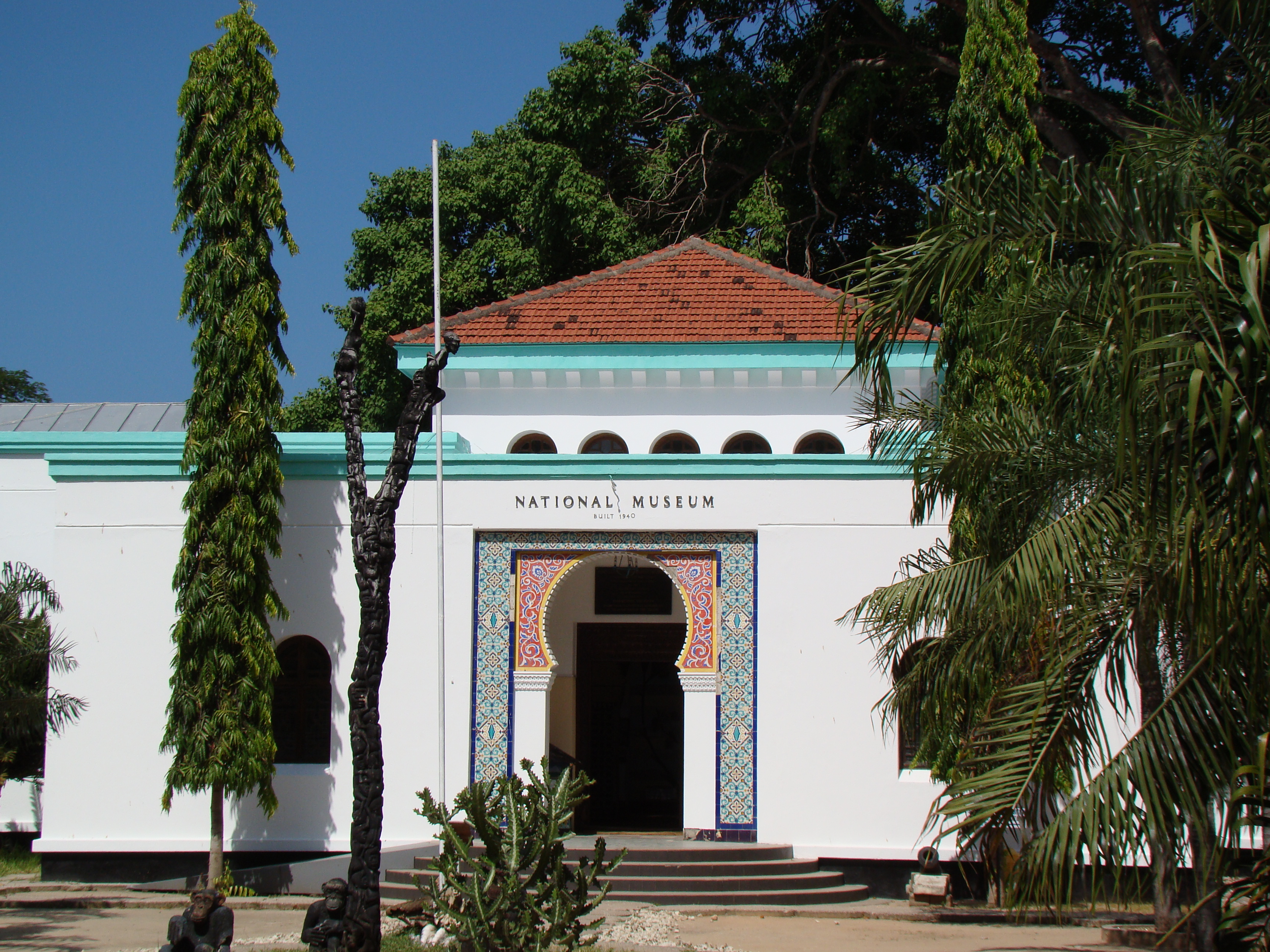
- The National Museum Dar es Salaam
- Established: 1934
- Location: Dar es Salaam
- Type: Museum for Natural and General history
- Key holdings: skull bones of Paranthropus boisei
- Collections: historical, ethnographic and natural collections
- Founder: Tanganyika governor Harold MacMichael.
- Director: Noel Biseko Lwoga
- Owners: Ministry of Natural Resources and Tourism
- Website: www.nmt.go.tz

The National Museum of Tanzania (NMT), (Swahili: Makumbusho ya Taifa), is a consortium of several Tanzanian museums whose purpose is to preserve and show objects from the history and natural environment of Tanzania. The consortium developed from the National Museum of Dar es Salaam, established in 1934 by Tanganyika governor Harold MacMichael. Six more museums later joined the consortium, namely the Village Museum in Dar es Salaam, the National History Museum and the Arusha Declaration Museum in Arusha, the Mwalimu Julius K. Nyerere Memorial Museum in Butiama, and the Majimaji Memorial Museum as well as the Dr. Rashid M. Kawawa Museum in Songea.

== Dar es Salaam National Museum ==
The National Museum of Tanzania was established as a corporate body under the National Museum Act No. 7 of 1980 as a scientific, educational and cultural institution. Its functions are the acquisition, research, documentation, preservation and presentation of objects pertaining to Tanzania's cultural and natural heritage. The management and the Director General of the NMT report to a supervisory Board, which oversees day-to-day operations.

The Dar es Salaam National Museum is located in Shaaban Robert Street, next to the botanical gardens in Kivukoni ward in Ilala District. Established in 1934 and open to the public since 1940, it was originally a memorial museum dedicated to King George V. Along with other automobiles, one of the cars of the former king is still on display.

The museum was expanded in 1963, with the addition of a second building. It is now dedicated to the history of Tanzania. Its most famous exhibits include skull bones of Paranthropus boisei that were among the findings of Mary and Louis Leakey at Olduvai. They belong to a specimen of the extinct genus Paranthropus from the evolutionary line of the Hominini that lived in East Africa around two million years ago.

The museum also has a large section dedicated to the Shirazi city-state of Kilwa. More historical miscellaneous material is related to the German and British rule, and ancient Chinese pottery. The museum also has ethnographic collections on Tanzanian cultures. In 2005, the official name of the museum was extended by the addition of "House of Culture" to emphasise the museum's cultural activities. The National Museum also organises events such as the Tanzanian Culture Festival.

According to the NMT website, 90 historical buildings and monuments are under its care. These include colonial buildings such as the historic Ocean Road Hospital in Dar es Salaam, the first German administrative building (Boma) and the first school in Bagamoyo, as well as the palaeontological Tendaguru archaeological site in Lindi.

== Village Museum ==
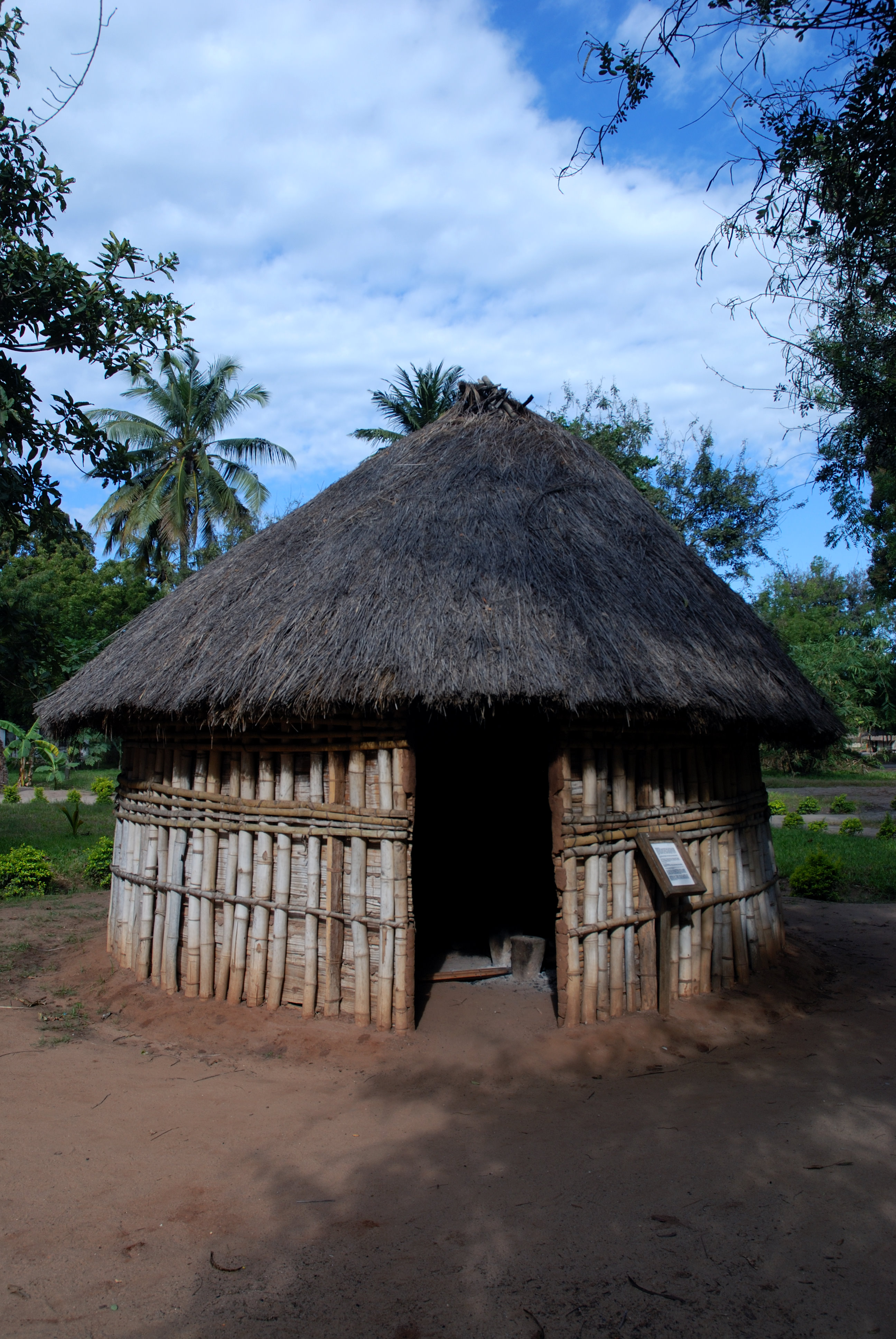
A traditional Nyakyusa woman's home at the Village Museum

The Kijiji cha Makumbusho, or Village Museum, established in 1967, is an open-air ethnographical museum located in Mikocheni ward of Kinondoni. It showcases traditional huts from 16 different Tanzanian ethnic groups. There are also examples of traditional cultivations, and traditional music and dance shows are held daily.

== National Natural History Museum ==
The National Natural History Museum in Arusha, open since 1987, is located in Arusha, on Boma Road. It has two permanent exhibits, on human evolution and entomology.

== Arusha Declaration Museum ==
The Arusha Declaration Museum, open since 1977, is located in Arusha, on Kaloleni Road. It displays documents on the colonial history of Tanzania, the fight for independence, and the Arusha Declaration where the first Tanzanian president Julius Nyerere outlined his political vision.

== Nyerere Museum ==
The Mwalimu Julius K. Nyerere Memorial Museum, or Nyerere Museum for short, was established in the year 1999. It is located in Butiama, where Tanzania's first president Julius Nyerere was born and is buried. The museum display items related to Nyerere's personal and political life.

== Dr. Rashid M. Kawawa Memorial Museum ==
This museum in Songea is dedicated to the first Prime Minister of the United Republic of Tanzania, Rashid Mfaume Kawawa. It was officially opened on 27 February 2017 and displays documents from his personal and political life.

== Majimaji Memorial Museum ==
The memorial museum in Songea commemorates the resistance fighters against German colonial troops and other victims of the Maji Maji War between 1905 and 1907. Historians estimate the number of deaths during this war at up to 300,000. The museum was opened in 1980 on the site where 67 Africans were hanged and buried in a mass grave on 27 February 1906.

A memorial service is held at the site on each anniversary. At the end of October 2023, German Federal President Frank-Walter Steinmeier visited the museum and asked for forgiveness for the acts of violence committed during German colonial rule. He also said that the skulls of resistance fighters who were killed and brought to Germany as trophies would be returned.

== See also ==
- List of museums in Tanzania
