= List of museums in Tanzania =

This is a list of museums in Tanzania.

== List ==
=== National museums ===
- National Museum of Tanzania, Dar-es-salaam
- Village Museum Tanzania, Kijitonyama (photos)
- The Arusha Declaration Museum, Arusha
- Majimaji Memorial Museum, Songea
- Mwalimu Nyerere Museum Centre, Butiama
- Dr. Rashid M. Kawawa Memorial Museum, Songea

=== Natural history ===
- National Natural History Museum
- Olduvai Gorge Museum, Ngorongoro Conservation Area

=== Other regions ===
- Olpopongi Masai Cultural village and Museum
- Regional Museum, Singida
- Sukuma Museum, Mwanza
- Iringa Boma Museum & Cultural center, Iringa
- Shinyanga Mazingira Museum, Shinyanga

=== Zanzibar museums ===
- Palace Museum, Zanzibar
- Zanzibar National History House and Culture (also called House of Wonders or Beit al-Ajaib)
- Peace Memorial Museum (Beit al-Amani)
- Zanzibar Natural History Museum (photos)
- Unguja Ukuu Archaeological Site Museum
- Princess Salme Museum, Zanzibar
- Freddie Mercury Museum, Zanzibar

== See also ==
- List of museums
