= Tharia Topan =

Zanzibar merchant

Tharia Topan (1823–1891) was a Khoja merchant and chief of customs of the Sultanate of Zanzibar during the 19th century.

== History ==
=== Early life ===
Tharia Topan was born in Lakhpar, Cutch State (1823) in British India, to a poor family engaged in vegetable trading. At the age of twelve, he was accused of stealing money, and was beaten and fled by hiding on a dhow. He awoke to find it already at sea bound for Zanzibar, where he arrived without money and illiterate. He found work as a garden sweeper in the household of Ladwa Damji for six shillings a month and gradually learned to read and write, setting the stage for his later rise in trade.

=== Career in Zanzibar ===
By his early twenties, Tharia Topan had become head of the credit department in the Jairam Shivri firm. While working there, he took a small loan to buy a donkey cart and began selling cloves and trading other goods on his own. His ventures proved profitable, allowing him to amass wealth. In 1845, he returned to Kutch for the first time in twelve years, married and brought his wife back to Zanzibar to expand his business.

Topan diversified into the clove, spice and ivory trades, while also financing both local and European merchants as a banker. In 1876, he was appointed chief of customs in Zanzibar, and by the end of the century had opened offices in Bombay with agents stationed in several Swahili ports.

His commercial success inspired many aspiring migrants from British India, particularly among the Khoja and other mercantile communities to travel to East Africa. Contemporary accounts report that he sponsored Isma'ili migrants to settle in Zanzibar and other towns, and sometimes directly employed them in this enterprises.

== Legacy ==
=== Old Dispensary (Zanzibar) ===
The construction of the Old Dispensary was commissioned in 1887 by Tharia Topan to celebrate Queen Victoria's Golden Jubilee. Topan intended the building to serve as a charitable hospital for the poor. When he died in 1891, the building was still unfinished. His widows resumed work, but had to halt construction in 1893 when funds were exhausted. That same year, following a family dispute, the building was sold to a new owner, who completed it in 1894. He also contributed to the Sir Charles Euan-Smith madrassa, helped establish an English school, and supported the Aga Khan and the Ismaili community, earning the title of Vara.

== See also ==
- Old Dispensary (Zanzibar)
- Barghash bin Said
- Tippu Tip
