= Sukuma Museum =

Coordinates: 2.5424184°S 33.039867°E

- Established: 1968
- Location: Mwanza, Tanzania
- Type: Art museum
- Collections: Sukuma culture artifacts
- Website: http://sukumamuseum.org/

The Sukuma Museum is a community-based museum located in Mwanza, Tanzania. It was designed in 1968, and is dedicated to the preservation and display of artifacts related to the Sukuma culture.

== See also ==
- List of museums in Tanzania
