= Olduvai Gorge Museum =

Museum in Tanzania

The Olduvai Gorge Museum
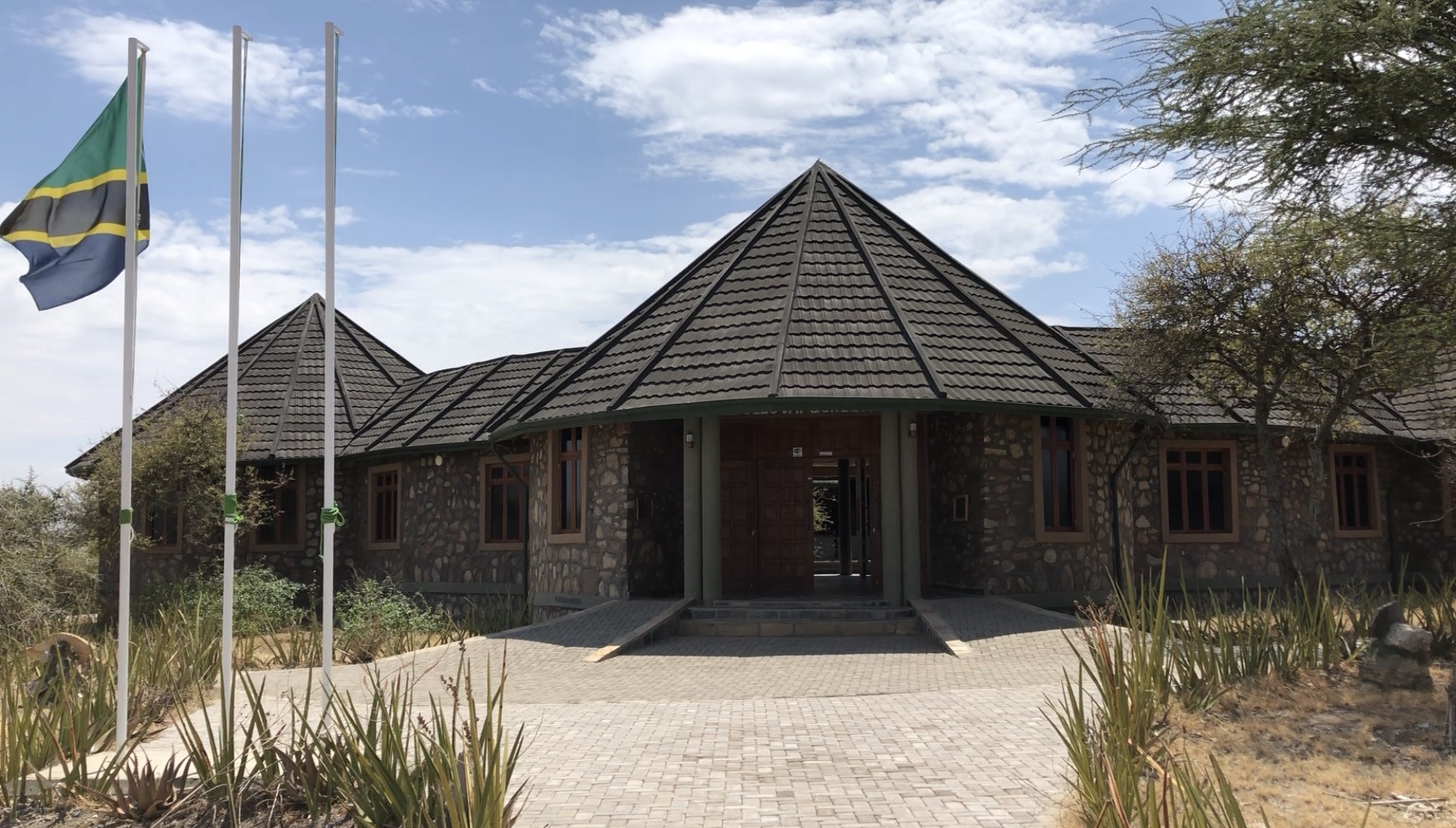
- View of the main entrance of the new museum which opened in 2018
- Established: late 1970s
- Location: Ngorongoro Conservation Area, Tanzania
- Coordinates: 2°59′46″S 35°21′08″E
- Collections: Paleoanthropological artifacts from the surrounding area
- Founder: Mary Leakey

The Olduvai Gorge Museum (Swahili: Makumbusho ya Bonde la Oltupai) is located in the Ngorongoro Conservation Area in Northern Tanzania on the edge of the Olduvai Gorge. The museum was founded by Mary Leakey and is now under the jurisdiction of the Tanzanian government's Department of Cultural Antiquities and is managed by the Ngorongoro Conservation Area Authority. It is a museum dedicated to the appreciation and understanding of the Olduvai Gorge and Laetoli fossil sites.

== History ==
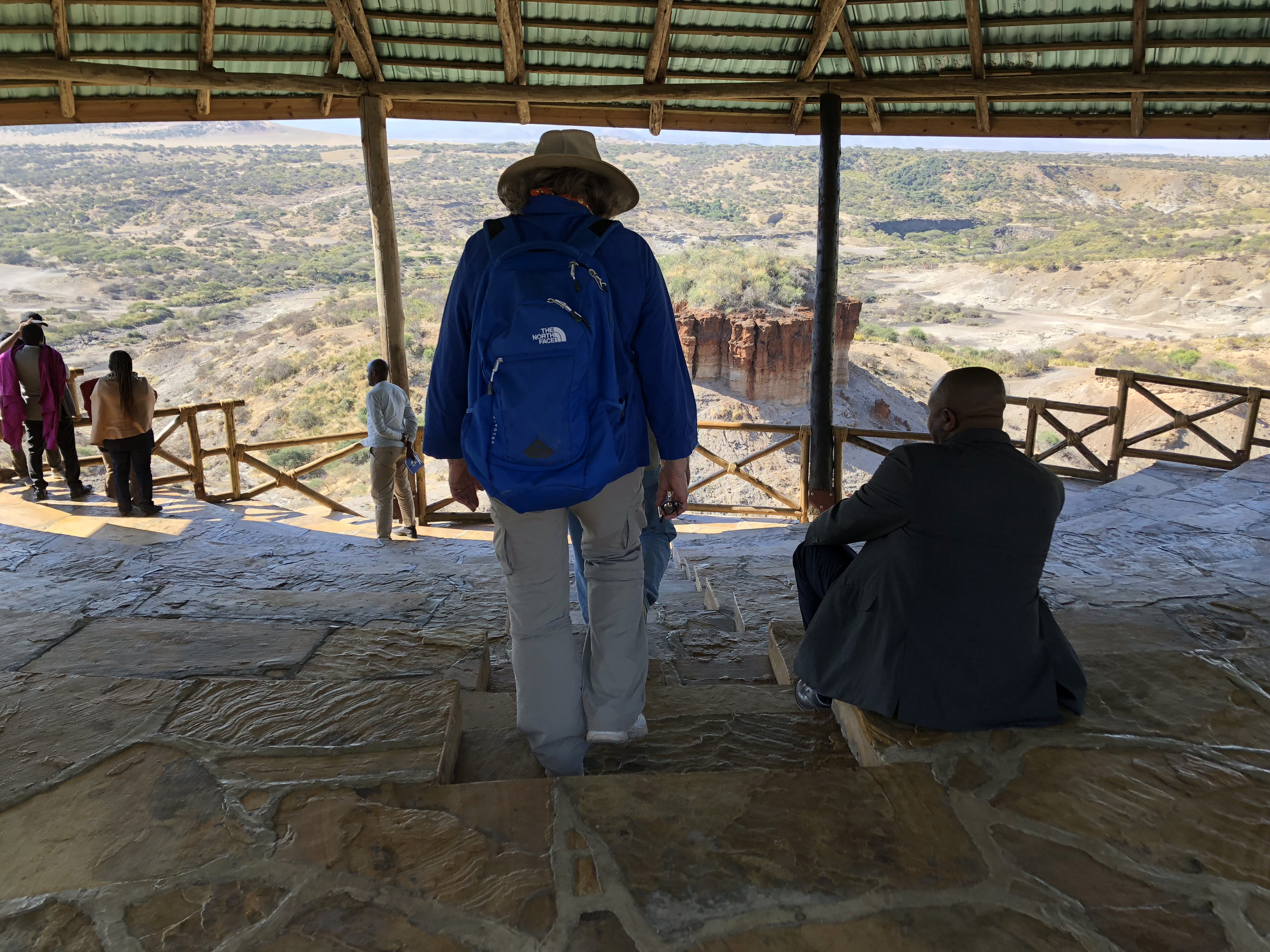
Visitors to the museum enjoy the view of the gorge from the covered overlook

The museum was founded in the late 1970s by Mary Leakey, an archaeologist and paleoanthropologist who conducted research in the gorge for decades. The museum was created to house and showcase paleoanthropological artifacts from the surrounding area. After Mary's death, the Olduvai Gorge Museum was put under control of the Tanzanian government's Department of Cultural Antiquities. During the mid-1990s, the J. Paul Getty Museum's Department of Conservation renovated and added to the museum. This included a new wing with exhibits that were designed by the Getty Museum.

The Ngorongoro Conservation Area Authority replaced the original museum structure with the construction of a new museum and visitors center which opened to the public in 2018. The new museum construction included the expansion and improvement of museum exhibits, enhancing the educational experience of the museum's visitors, the addition of a cultural boma with spaces where visitors can explore aspects of Maasai culture, as well as a small restaurant and a covered theater-like viewing platform that provides visitors an inspiring view of the gorge. Both the new museum, visitor center, restaurant and theater-like viewing platform were designed and built(using quartzite stones) by Eng. Joshua Mwankunda, Manager for Cultural Heritage Department at Ngorongoro Conservation Area Authority so that the exhibit halls form a ring around a central open area at the heart of the museum, mimicking the layout of a Maasai boma embracing Maasai architectural abilities.

== Location ==
The museum is located within the Ngorongoro Conservation Area in northern Tanzania and sits along the rim of the gorge at the junction of the main gorge and the smaller side gorge. The museum is approximately 5 km beyond the turnoff from the main road that runs from Serengeti National Park to the Ngorongoro Crater.

== Exhibits ==
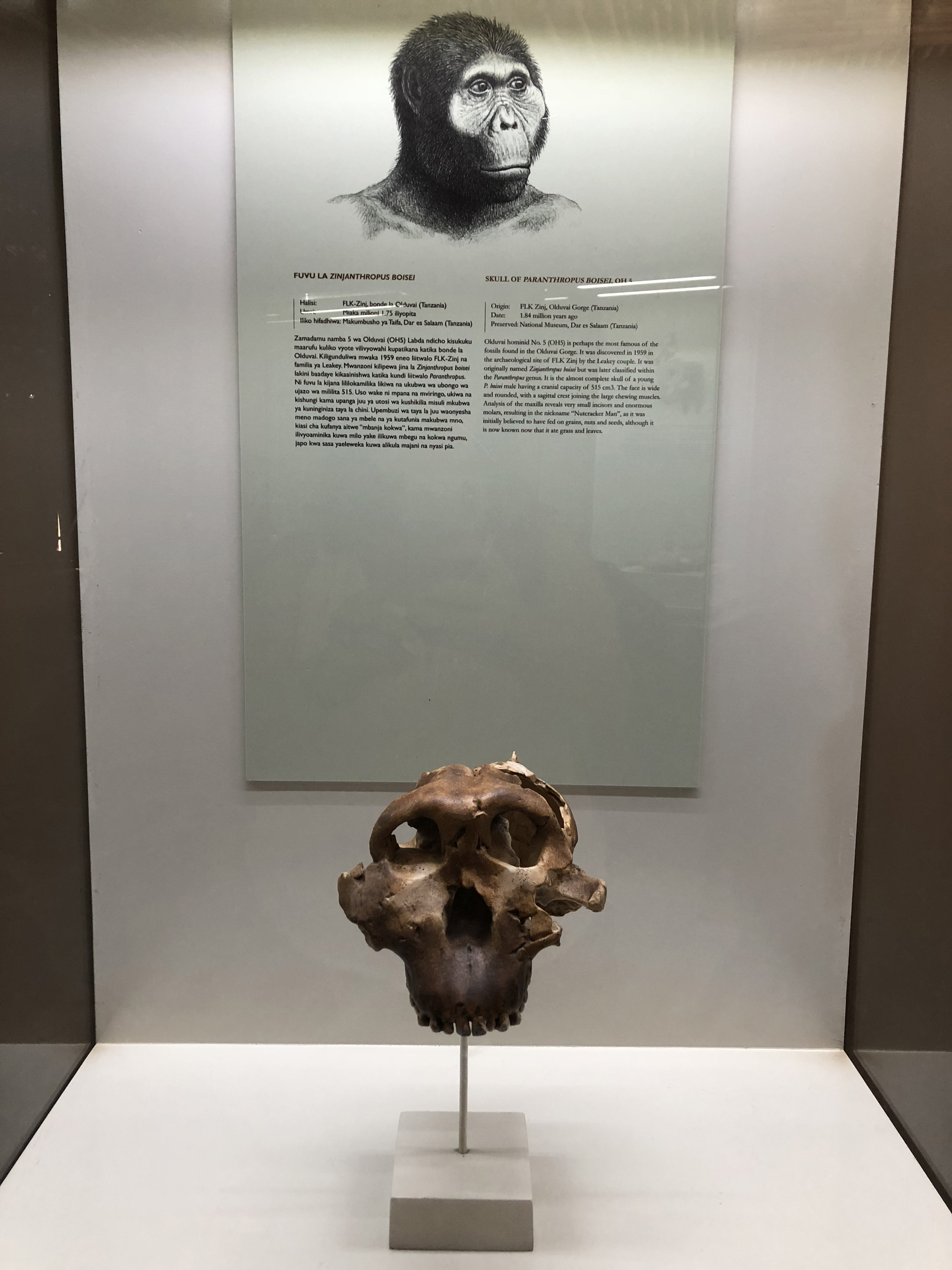
A cast of the famous Zinjanthropus (Paranthropus boisei) skull discovered by Mary Leakey in 1959 is displayed in the new museum.

The exhibits at the Olduvai Gorge Museum are centered around the paleoanthropological research and artifacts that have come from the surrounding area. There is one hall dedicated to the Leakey family and their pursuit of working at Olduvai Gorge. This hall has historical artifacts from the Olduvai Gorge area as well as charts and maps explaining the process of fossil excavation. Many of the artifacts are original but some are casts (specifically the hominid fossils). The adjacent hall is dedicated solely to the Laetoli fossilized footprints. A cast that was made of part of the footprint trail in 1996 by the J. Paul Getty Museum is on display. Accompanying this are several charts and photographs describing and illustrating the process of the Laetoli Footprints creation. There is also a large illustration depicting three Australopithecus afarensis walking through the area 3.6 million years ago. In addition to these indoor museum exhibits there are also two outdoor lecture areas. These are utilized for orientation presentations given by museum staff.

== Visitors ==
The Olduvai Gorge Museum receives roughly 3000 visitors each day during peak season from all around the world. Most visitors arrive by safari car, stopping for lunch and a museum tour before continuing on to Serengeti National Park.

== Gallery ==
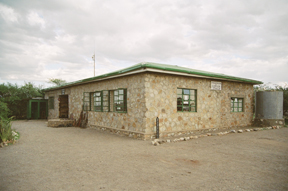
The old Olduvai Gorge Museum as it looked in 2006

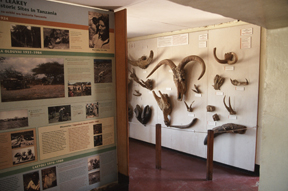
Old Olduvai Gorge Museum interior

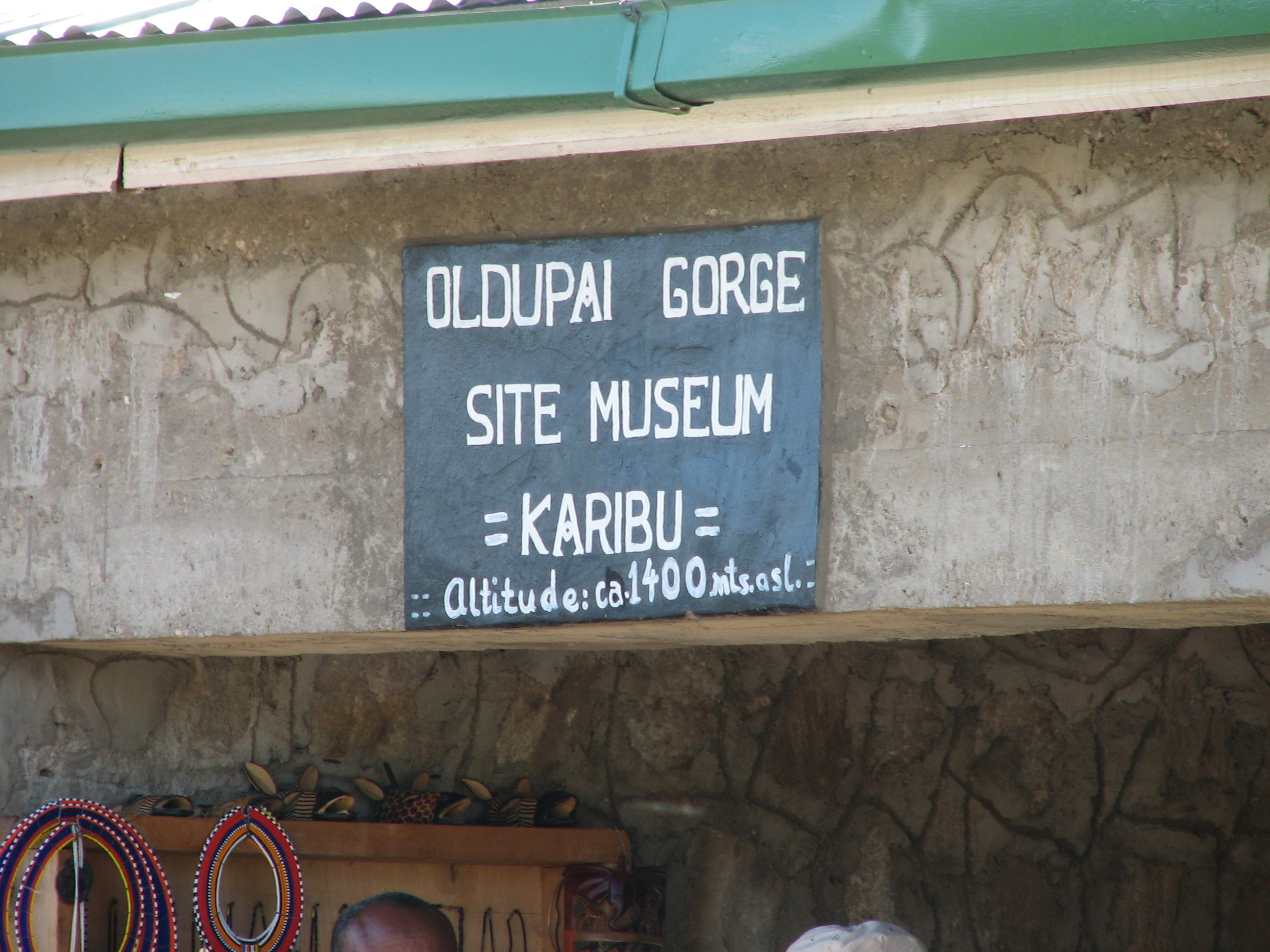
Entryway sign of the old museum

== See also ==
- List of museums in Tanzania
