= Old Fort of Zanzibar =

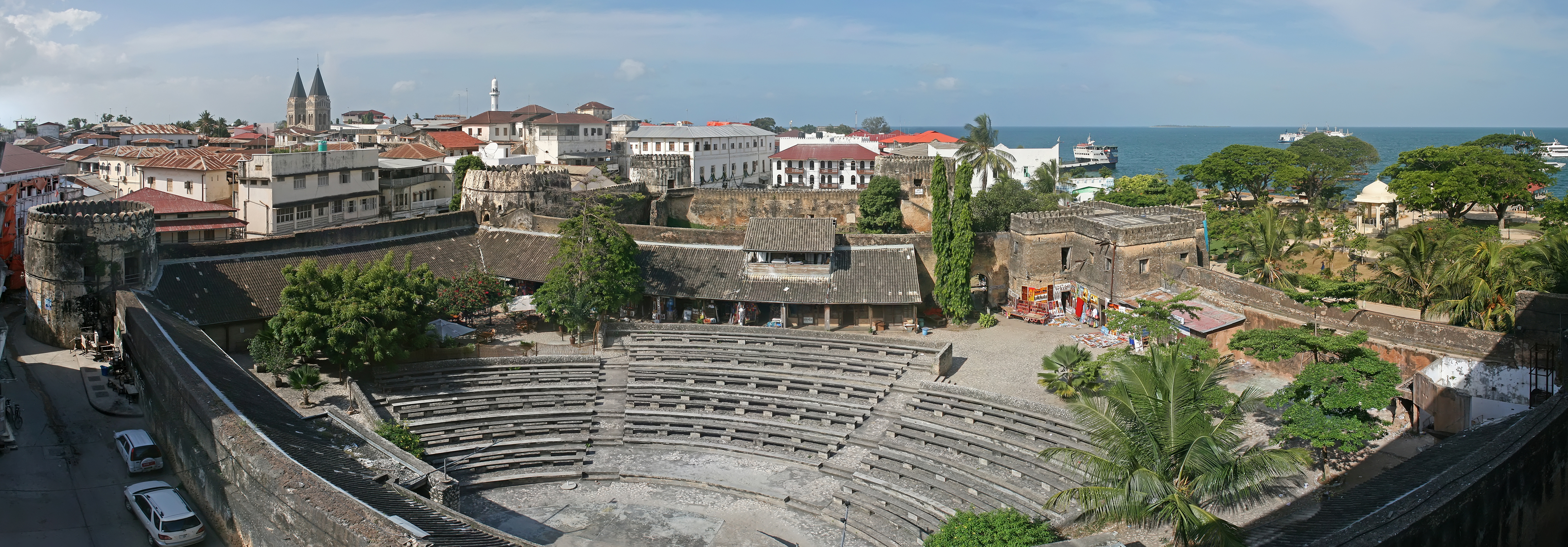
- The old fort as seen from the House of Wonders

- Location within Tanzania
- Former names: Arab Fort

General information
- Type: Fort
- Location: Stone Town, Zanzibar, Tanzania
- Coordinates: 6°9′41″S 39°11′21″E
- Completed: 1699

The Old Fort (Swahili: Boma la Kale la Zanzibar), also known as the Arab Fort and by other names, is a fortification located in Stone Town, the capital of Zanzibar. It is the oldest building and a major visitor attraction of Stone Town. It is located on the main seafront, adjacent to another landmark building of the city, the House of Wonders (former palace of the Sultan of Zanzibar), and facing the Forodhani Gardens.

== History ==
"Old Fort is one of the oldest buildings in Stone Town, originally built by the Portuguese in the 17th century and later re-built by the Omanis in the 18th century. It was used as a garrison and prison in the 19th century, and as a terminal of the Zanzibar railways 1905-28. A new guardhouse was built in 1947 and used as the ladies' club, and an amphitheatre was added in the 1990s. It is now the headquarters of the Zanzibar international film festival."

It was later used as a prison and as barracks. In early 20th century it was also used as a depot during the construction of the railway that connected Stone Town to the village of Bububu.

The fort is essentially a square of high, brown walls with merlons, protecting an inner courtyard. In the courtyard there are some remnants of earlier buildings, including those of a Portuguese church and another Omani fortification.

== Tourism ==
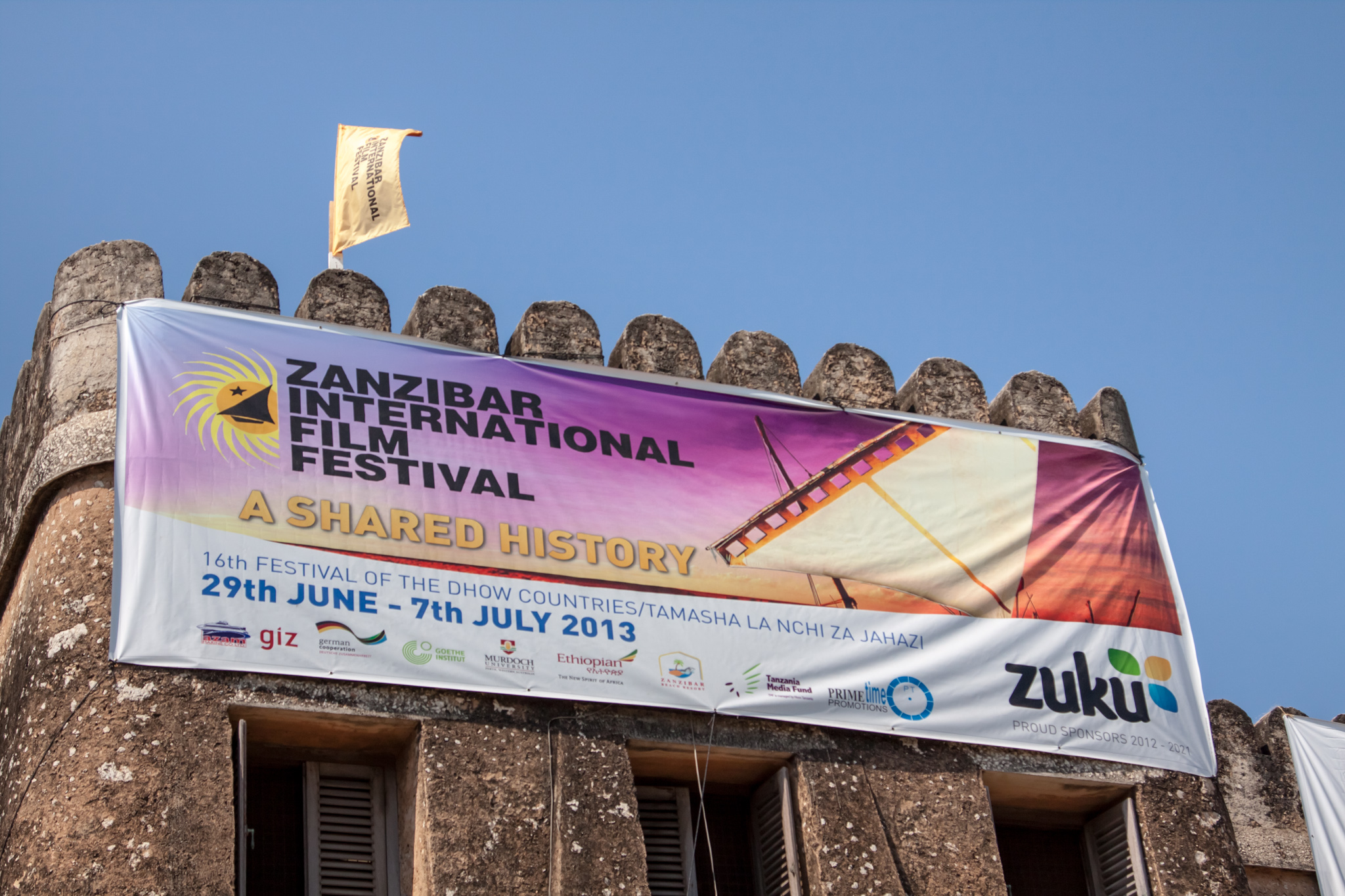
ZIFF is held at the fort

The Old Fort is one of the prominent visitor attractions in Stone Town, and its courtyard has been adapted to serve as a cultural centre with curio shops selling tourist-oriented merchandise such as tingatinga paintings; it also has an open-air amphitheatre where live dance and music shows are held most evenings, a restaurant, and a tourist information desk. It is also the main venue used for large events such as the Festival of the Dhow Countries (also known as the Zanzibar International Film Festival) and the Sauti za Busara.
