= Sultan's Palace, Zanzibar =

Museum in Zanzibar

The Sultan's Palace
- بيت الساحل
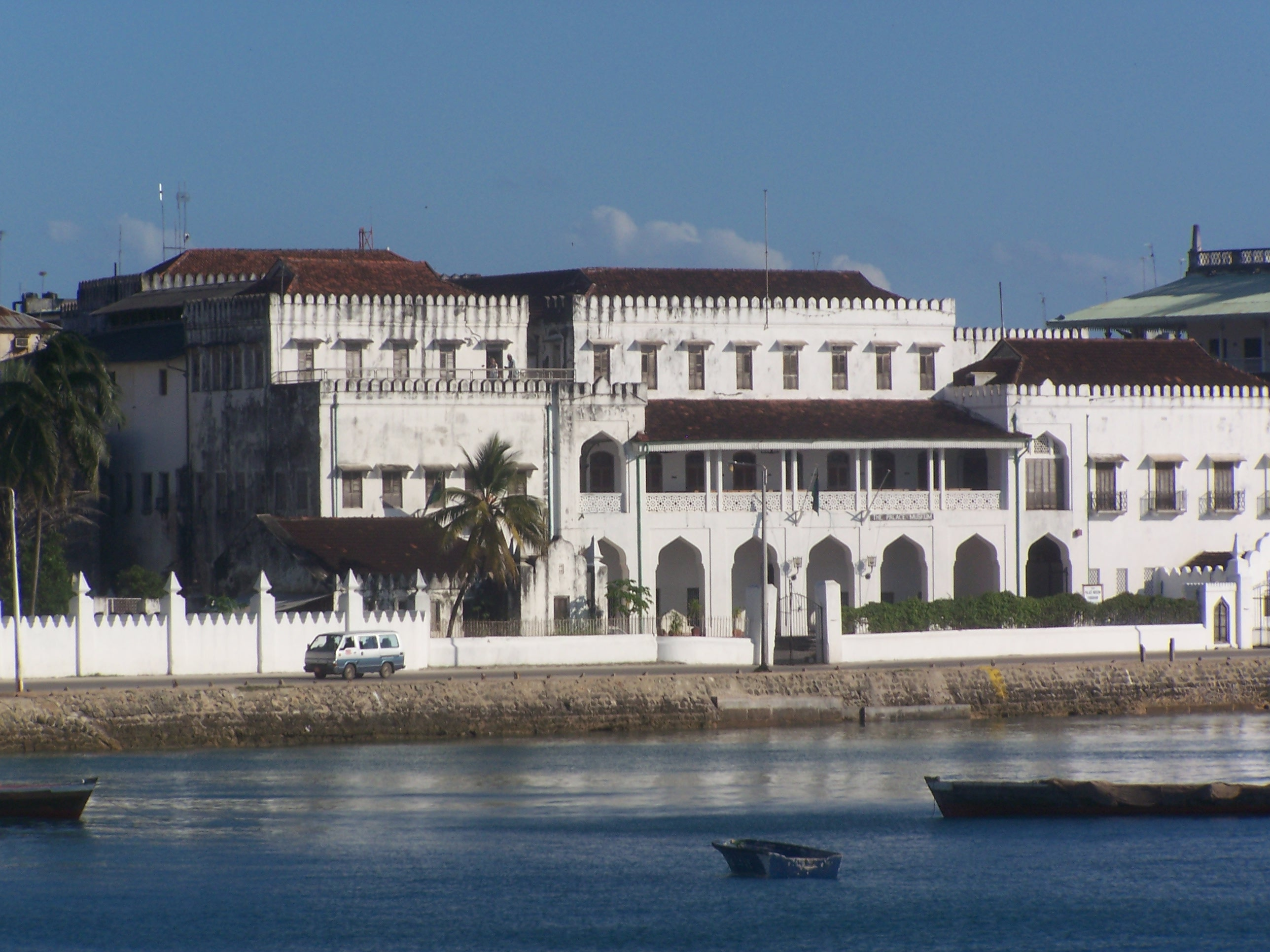
- The Sultan's Palace as viewed from the Indian Ocean.

- Location within Tanzania
- Established: 19th century
- Location: Mizingani Road, Stone Town, Zanzibar, Tanzania.
- Coordinates: 6.1599°S 39.1905°E
- Type: historical buildings

The Sultan's Palace is one of the main historical buildings of Stone Town, Zanzibar, Tanzania. It is a 3-story building with merlon-decorated white walls, located in Mizingani Road, on the seafront, between the House of Wonders and the Old Dispensary.

It stands on the site of the previous palace, called Bait As-Sahel (Arabic: بيت الساحل) that was destroyed in the Anglo Zanzibar war of 1896., The present palace was built in late 19th century to serve as a residence for the Sultan's family. After the Zanzibar Revolution, in 1964 it was formally renamed to People's Palace and used as a government seat. In 1994, it became a museum about the Zanzibari royal family and history.

One floor of the museum is dedicated to Sultan Sir Khalifa bin Harub; another one to Sayyida Salme, best known as Emily Ruete, former Zanzibari princess who fled from the sultanate to relocate to Hamburg, Germany with her husband Rudolph Heinrich Ruete; the exhibits include some of her writings, clothes and daily life accessories. Several of the furniture items and other belongings to the sultan's family are in exhibition to give visitors an idea of how life was in Zanzibar during the 19th century.

== Gallery ==
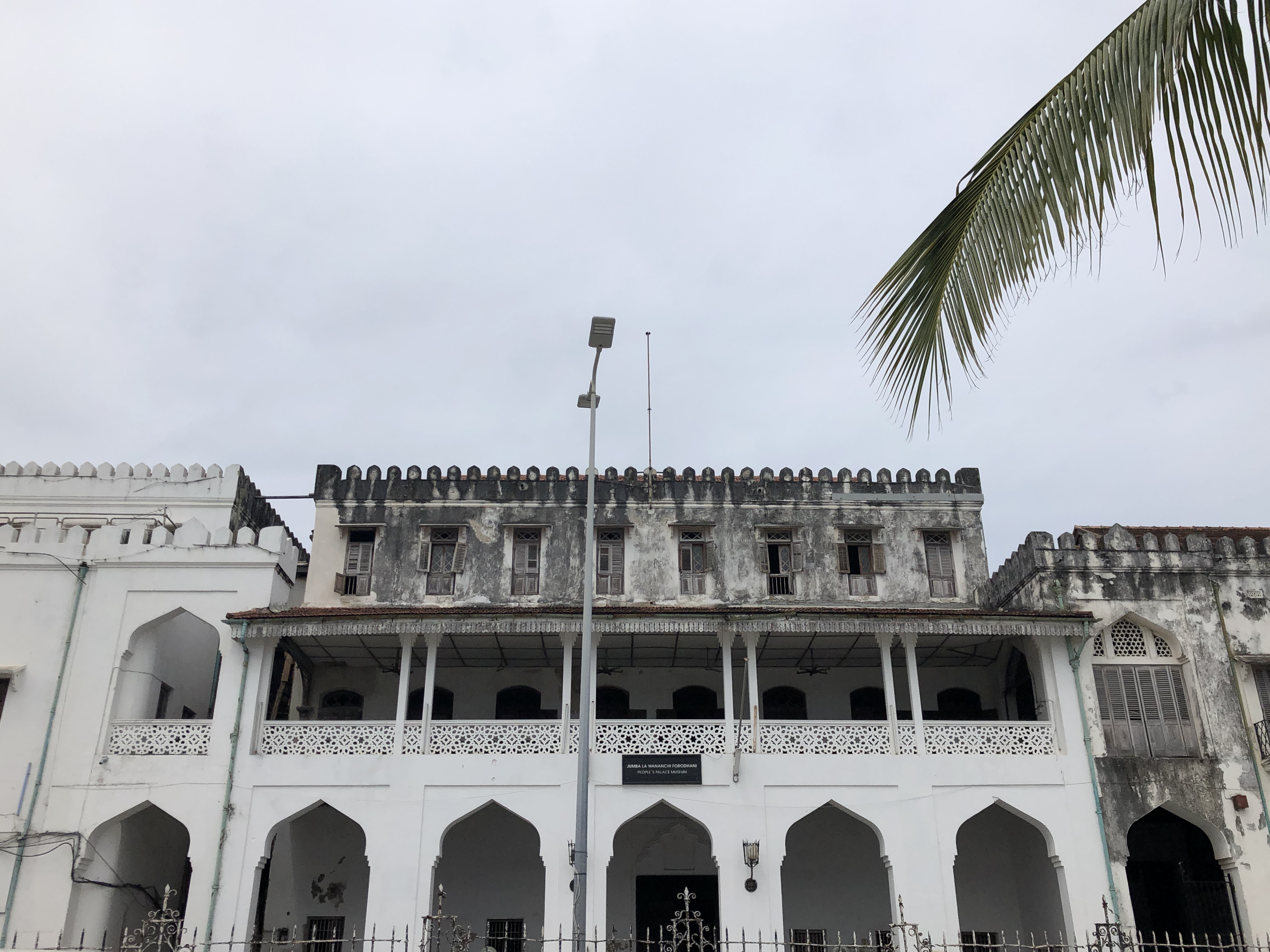
The entrance

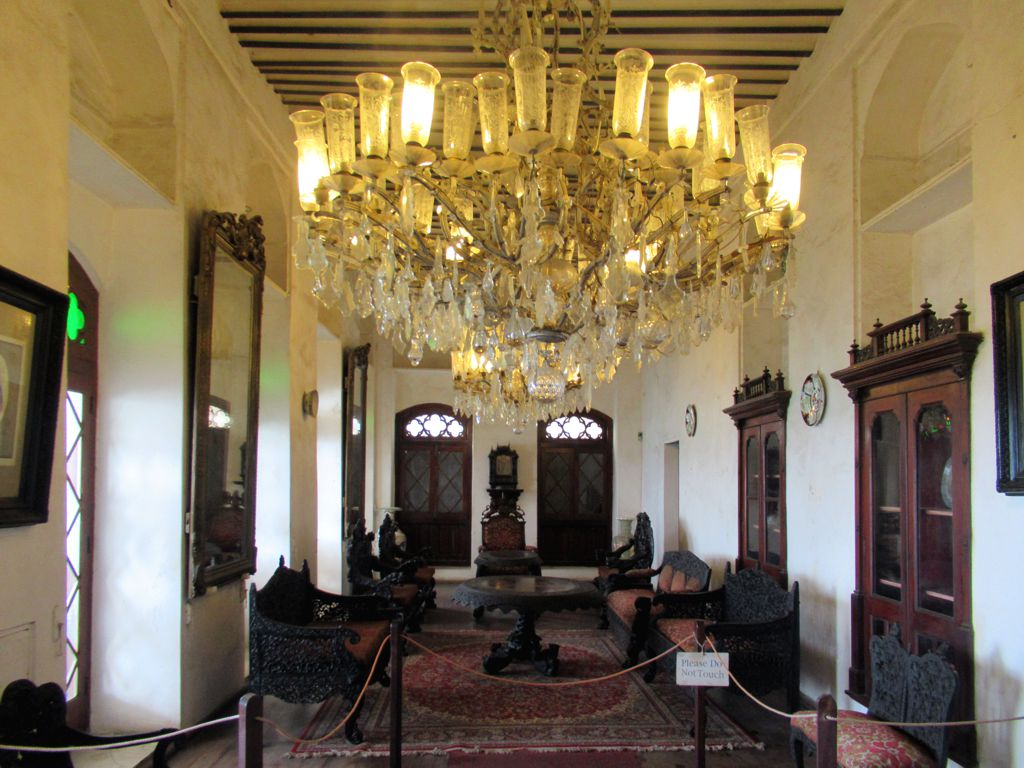
The interior

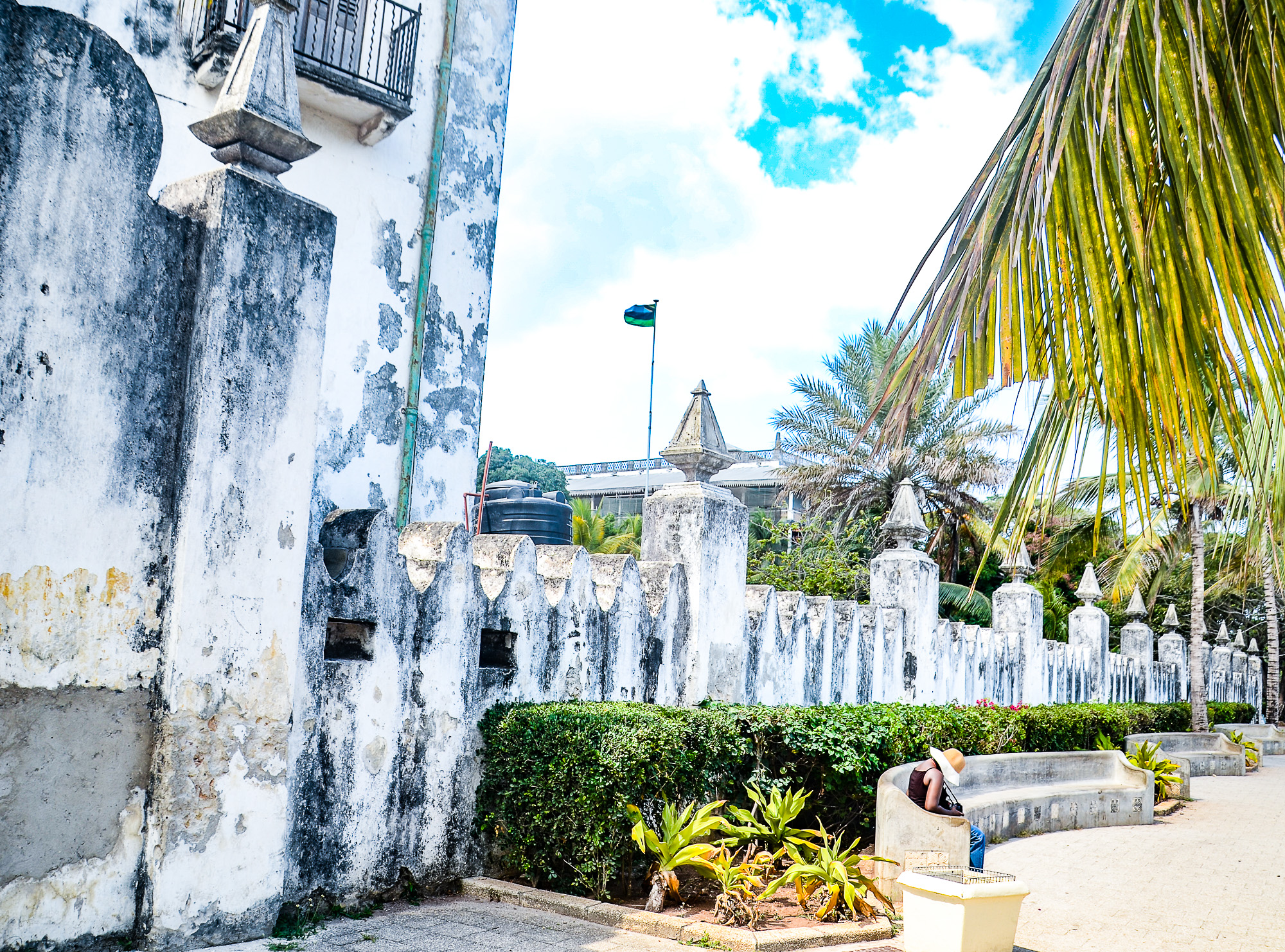
The gate

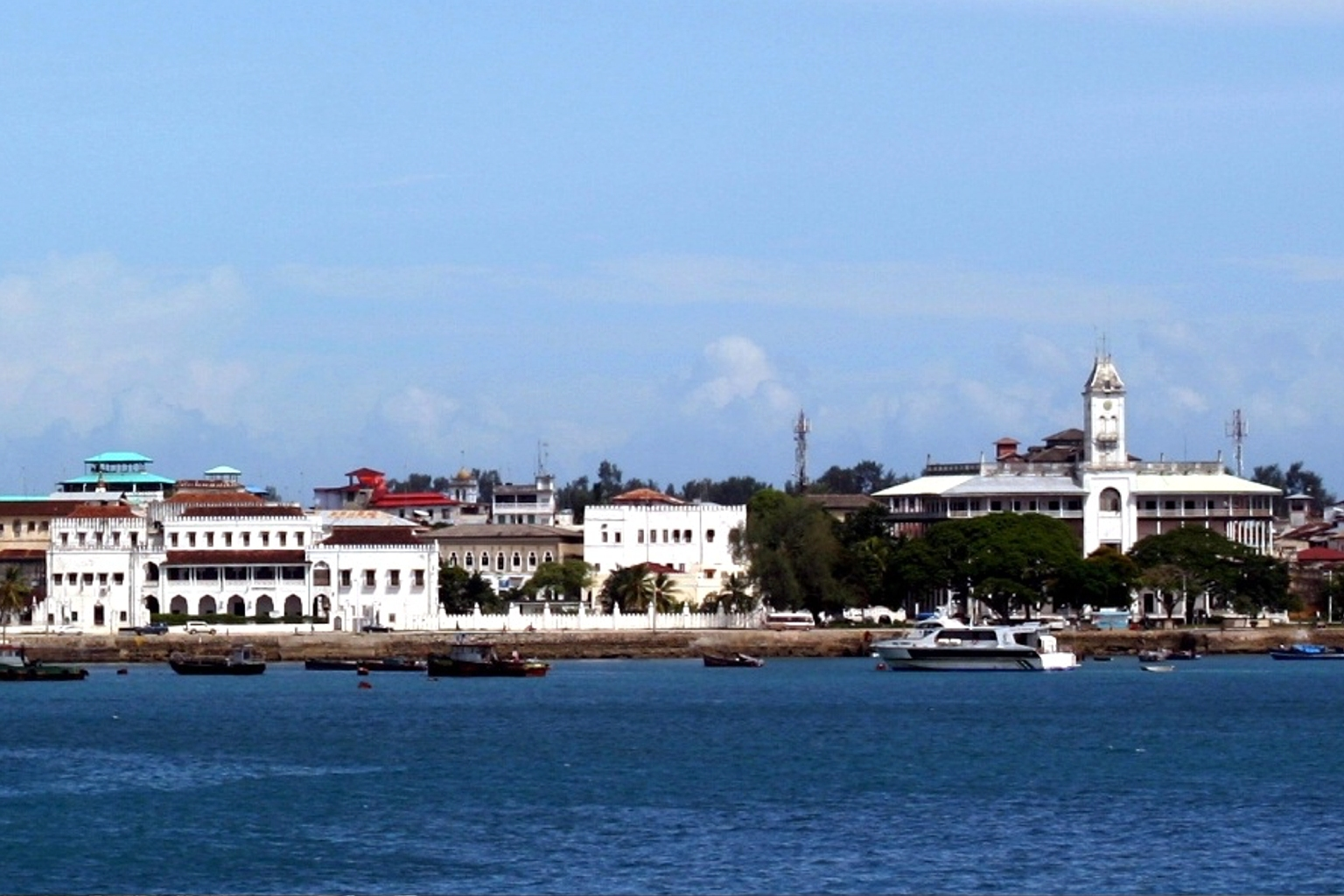

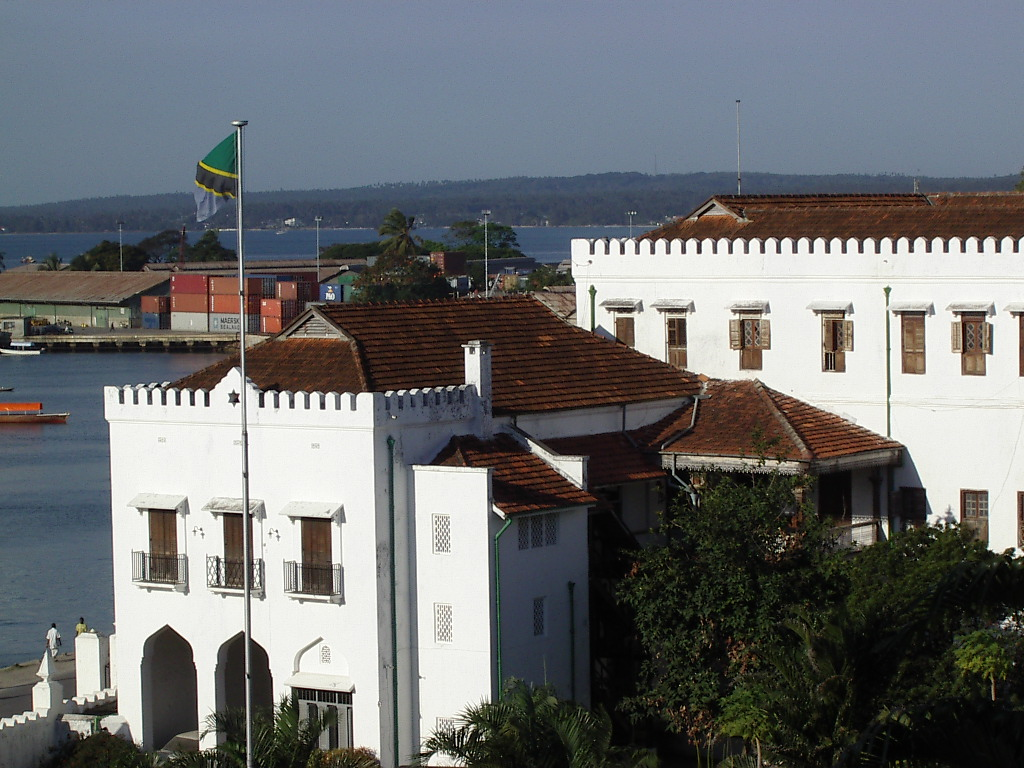

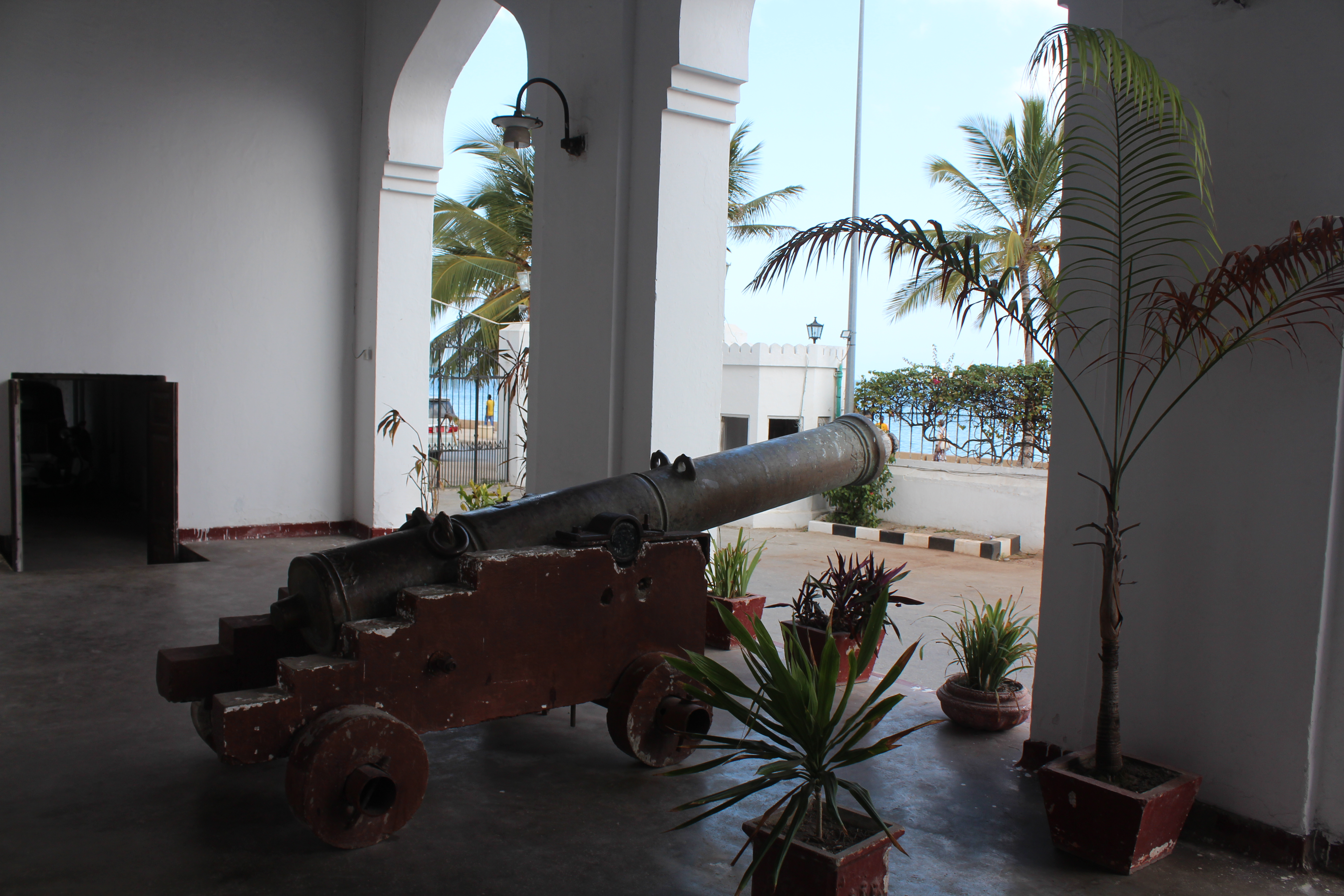
Cannon

== See also ==
- List of museums in Tanzania
