= Forodhani Gardens =

Park in Zanzibar, Tanzania

Coordinates: 6°09′38″S 39°11′19″E

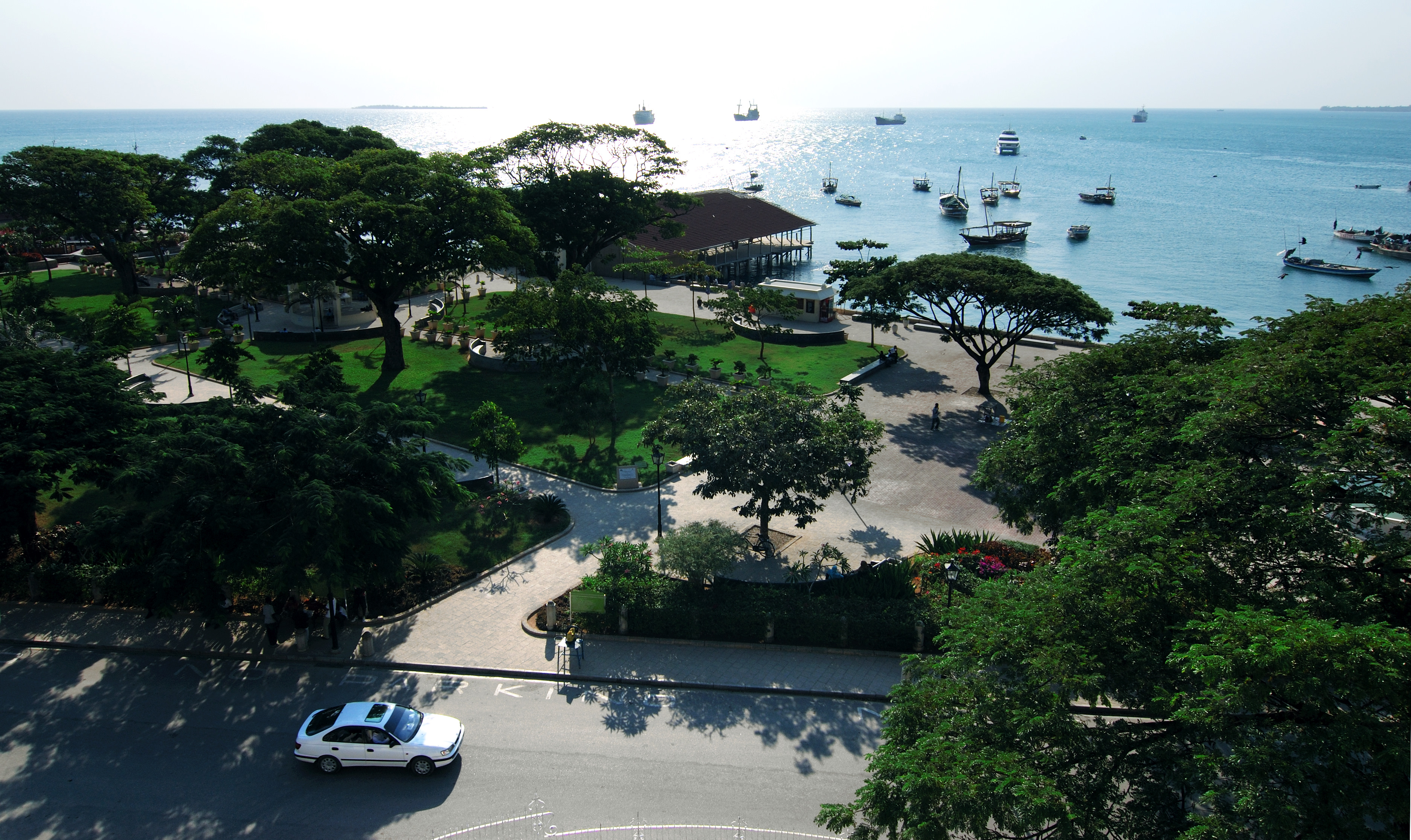
- The Forodhani Gardens as seen from the front balcony of the House of Wonders
- Interactive map of Forodhani Gardens
- Type: Public park
- Location: Zanzibar, Tanzania
- Owner: Government of Tanzania
- Status: Open year round
- Website: www.mnrt.go.tz

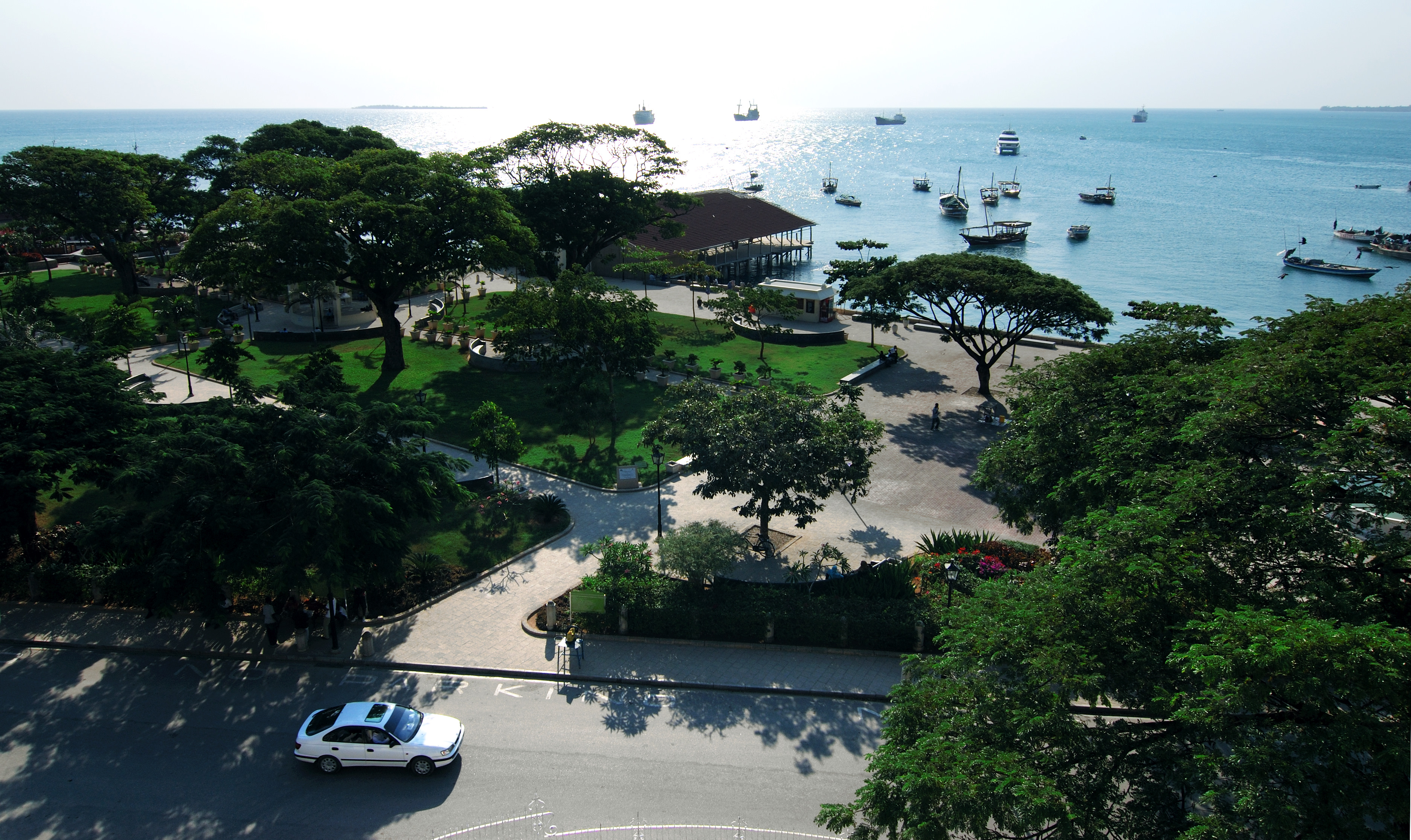
The Forodhani Gardens as seen from the front balcony of the House of Wonders

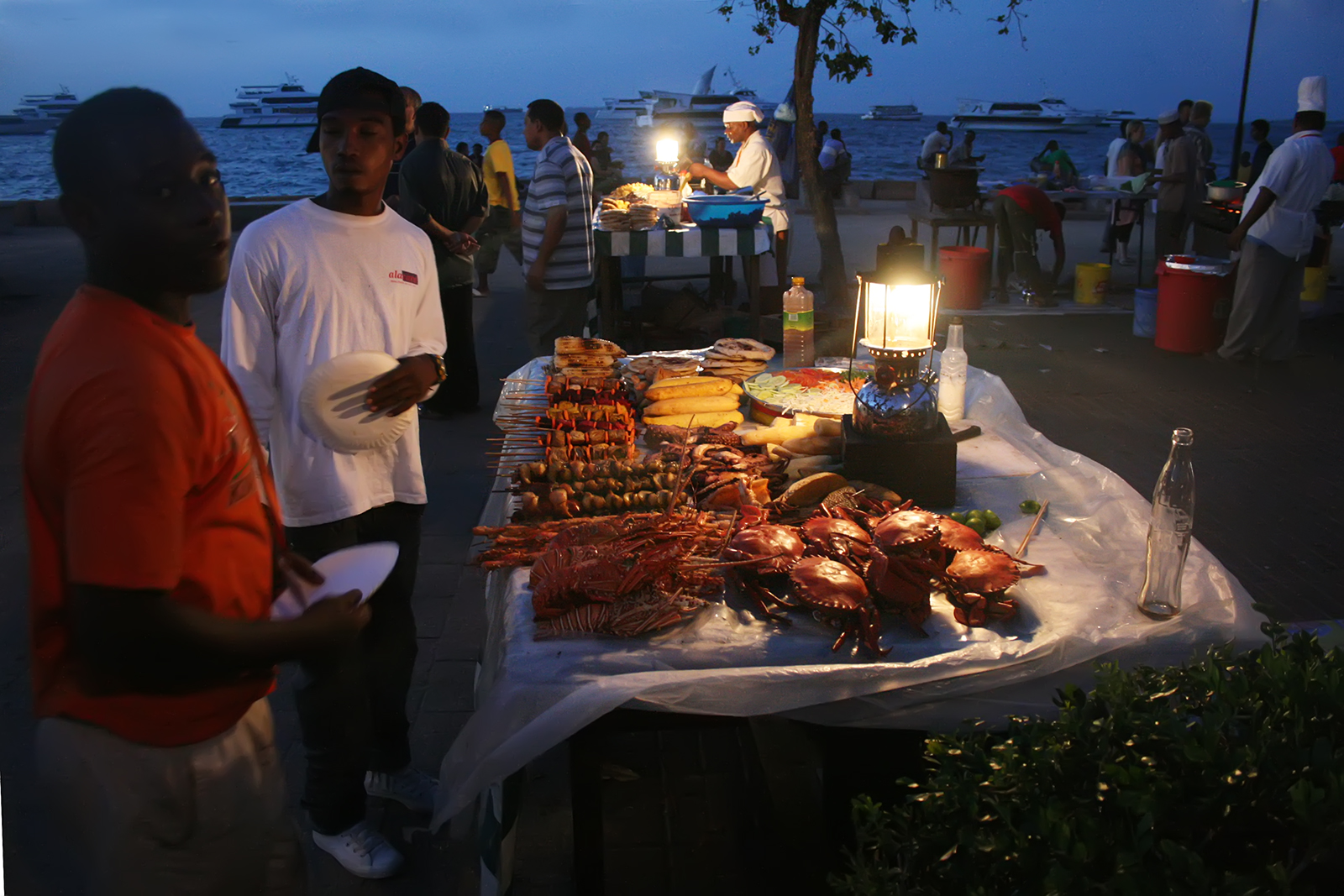
Caterers display food items for sale in the park. The Indian Ocean can be seen in the background.

The Forodhani Gardens (also known as Jubilee Gardens and more recently as Forodhani Park) is a small park in the historical city of Stone Town, Zanzibar, Tanzania. The gardens are located along the main seawalk of Stone Town, just in front of the most famous buildings of Stone Town, i.e., the House of Wonders and the Old Fort.

The Gardens are especially busy after sunset, when tourists and local alike gather in a popular food street market in the main square, to have dinner enjoying Swahili and Zanzibari cuisine delicacies such as grilled seafood, samoosas, cassava and sweet potatoes.

On July 31, 2009, a ground-breaking ceremony was held by the Aga Khan to introduce a revitalized park. It was rehabilitated by Aga Khan Trust for Culture (AKTC) at a cost of $3 million (Sh3.9 billion) from the initial estimates of $2.4 million (over Sh3 billion). The facelift involved the restoration of pedestrian walkways, landscape, infrastructure upgrading, incorporating lighting, sewerage drainage and civic amenities, and the rehabilitation of the seawall fronting the park.
