= Zanzibari cuisine =

Culinary traditions of Zanzibar

Zanzibari cuisine reflects several heterogeneous influences, as a consequence of the multi-cultural and multi-ethnic nature of Zanzibar's and Swahili heritage. It is a mixture of various culinary traditions, including Bantu, Arab, Portuguese, Indian, British, and even Chinese cuisine.

== Early history ==
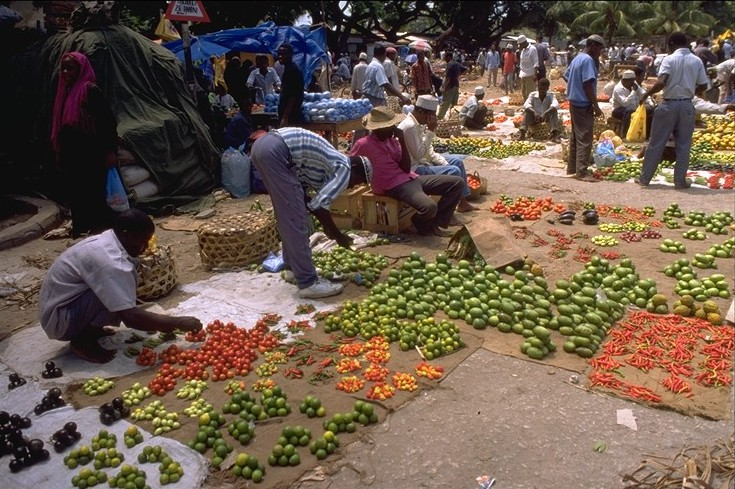
Vegetables and food market, Stone Town

The first inhabitants of Zanzibar were Bantus coming from mainland Tanganyika. They consisted of mostly fishers and their diet thus consisted of primarily seafood, such as tuna, mackerel, lobster, squid, octopus, and oysters. Other ingredients and recipes brought by Bantus that are found in today's Zanzibari cuisine (some of which became widespread during European colonialism) are common beans, sweet potatoes, manioc chips, yam, and plaintain.

In the 9th century, Omanis, Yemenis, and Persians began colonizing the Swahili Coast, including the Zanzibar Archipelago. They brought new dishes and ingredients, most notably spices, coconut, mango, citrus, and rice. One of the most common Zanzibar recipes, pilau (rice, coconuts, nuts, and spices), clearly reflects its Arab origin.

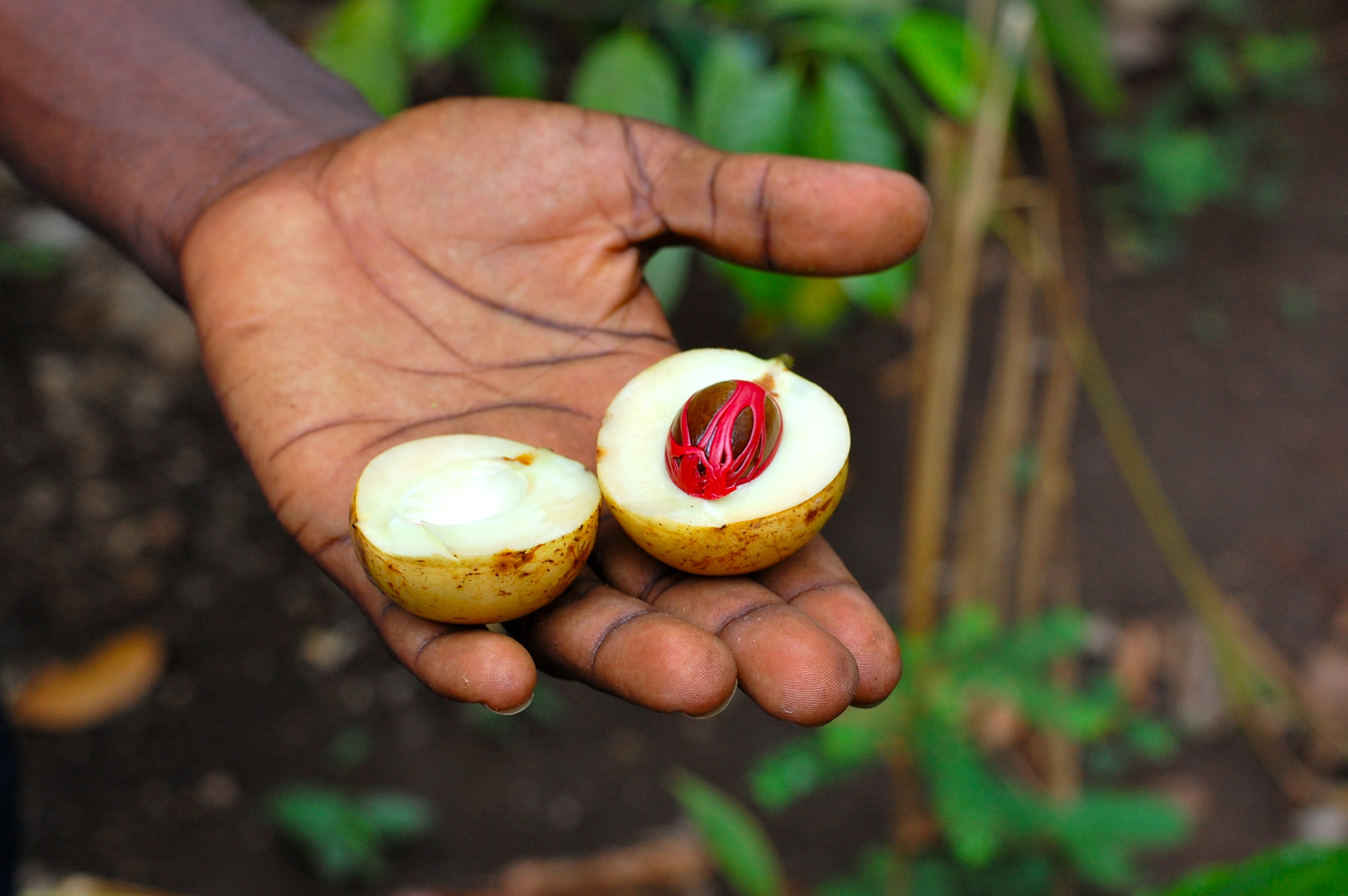
Fresh nutmeg in Zanzibar (Tanzania)

Between the 15th century and the 16th century, the Portuguese quickly conquered most of the coast, including Zanzibar. The main Portuguese influences on Zanzibari cuisine was the introduction of those that would become major types of staple food in Zanzibar, namely manioc, maize, and pineapple.

In 1651, the Portuguese lost control of Zanzibar to the Omani sultanate. The Omanis brought new spices and intensified the commercial relationships between Zanzibar and India; as a consequence, Indian recipes such as chutney, masala, biryani, curry, fish cakes, and samoosa (samosa) made it to Zanzibar. Most recipes of foreign origin were adapted to the ingredients that were available on the island, thus giving birth to a largely original "fusion" cuisine.

Around the beginning of the 20th century, most of the African Great Lakes region was colonised by the Germans and the British. Those did not mix with the local population as much as the Arabs, Persians, and Indians had done, and their influence on Zanzibari cuisine is less evident; yet, some very common Zanzibari recipes, such as pepper steak, can be generically defined as having a European origin.

== Post-independence ==
After independence, Tanzania established a strong relationship with China; Chinese physicians, engineers, and military consultants came to Zanzibar. Although only a small fraction of today's Zanzibari population have Chinese origins, some recipes and ingredients, such as soy sauce, have become commonplace on the island.
