= Old Dispensary (Zanzibar) =

Historic building in Stone Town, Zanzibar

- Ithnashiri Dispensary
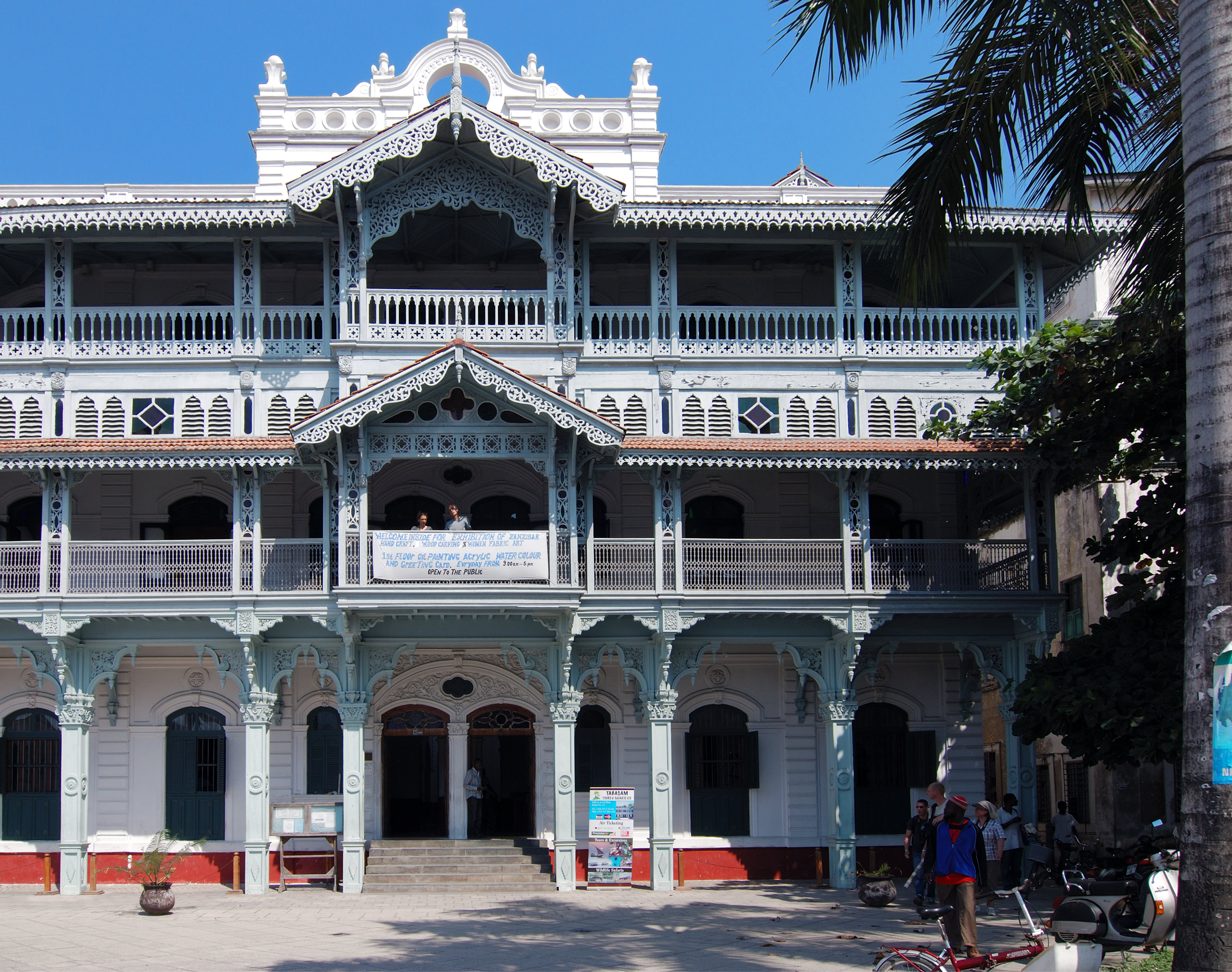
- The Old Dispensary

- Location within Tanzania

General information
- Location: Stone Town, Zanzibar, Tanzania
- Coordinates: 6.1584°S 39.1926°E
- Construction started: 1887
- Completed: 1894

The Old Dispensary, also known as Ithnashiri Dispensary, is a historical building in Stone Town, Zanzibar. It is located on the seafront, in Mizingani Road, halfway between the Palace Museum and the harbour. It owes its name to the fact that it served as a dispensary in the first half of the 20th century.

The Dispensary is one of the most finely decorated buildings of Stone Town and a symbol of the multi-cultural architecture and heritage of the city. Its wooden carved balconies, with stained glass decorations, are of Indian influence; the main structure is built with traditional Zanzibari coral rag and limestone, but covered with stucco adornments of European neo-classical taste. The inside of the building is just as sophisticated, with a covered courtyard and carved bridges connecting the floors.

The Dispensary is one of Stone Town's major tourist attractions. It has a small museum about the history of Zanzibar.

== History ==
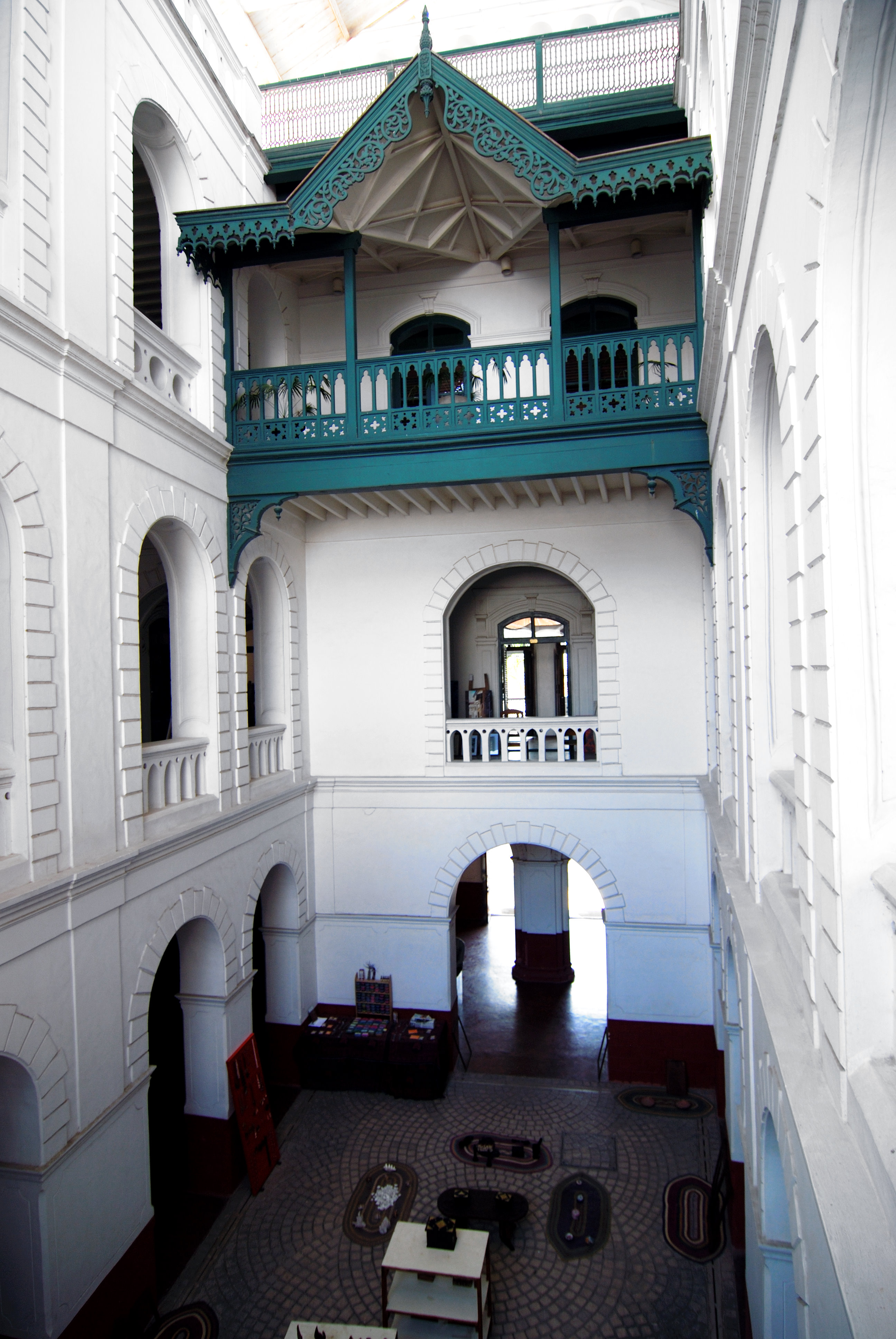
The inner courtyard

The construction of the Old Dispensary was commissioned in 1887 by Tharia Topan, a wealthy Ismaili Indian, to celebrate Queen Victoria's Golden Jubilee. Topan's intent was for the building to be used as a charitable hospital for the poor. When he died in 1891, the building was not finished. His widow resumed the works but had to suspend them in 1893 for her budget was exhausted. That same year, as a consequence of a family quarrel, the building was sold off to a new owner, who finally brought it to completion in 1894.

In 1900 the building was bought by another prominent Indian merchant living in Zanzibar, Haji Nasser Nurmohamed, who decided that the ground floor would be used as a dispensary, while the upper floors were partitioned into apartments.

In 1964, following the Zanzibar Revolution (whereby most Zanzibari Indians, including those who lived in the dispensary, fled abroad), the building was requisitioned by the government, and later fell into disuse and decay.

In 1990, as a part of a general plan for the renovation of the historical buildings of Stone Town, the Aga Khan Trust for Culture obtained from the Revolutionary Government of Zanzibar the permission to restore the Dispensary. This was completed in April 1994.
