= House of Wonders =

Landmark building in Stone Town, Zanzibar

Museum of History & Culture of Zanzibar & the Swahili Coast
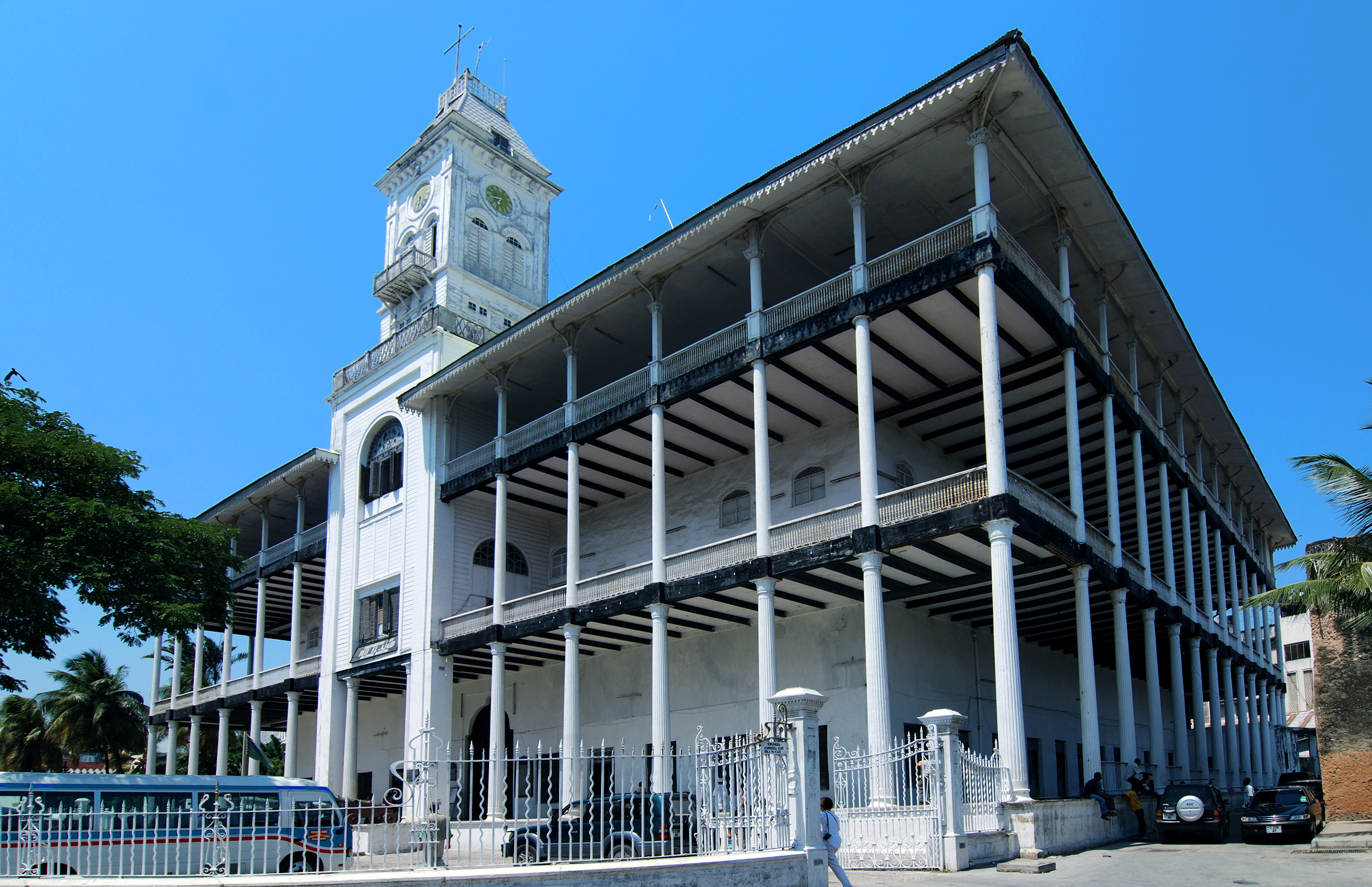
- The House of Wonders in 2010
- Established: 1 January 2000
- Coordinates: 6.160914°S 39.189591°E
- Owner: Government of Tanzania

The House of Wonders or Palace of Wonders (in Arabic: بيت العجايب Bayt al-ʿAjāʾib) is a landmark building in Stone Town, Zanzibar. It is the largest and tallest building of Stone Town and occupies a prominent place facing the Forodhani Gardens on the old town's seafront in Mizingani Road. It is located between the Old Fort and the Palace Museum (and former Sultan's Palace). It is one of six palaces built by Barghash bin Said, second Sultan of Zanzibar, and it is said to be located on the site of the 17th-century palace of Zanzibari queen Fatuma. The House of Wonders housed the Museum of History and Culture of Zanzibar and the Swahili Coast.

== History ==
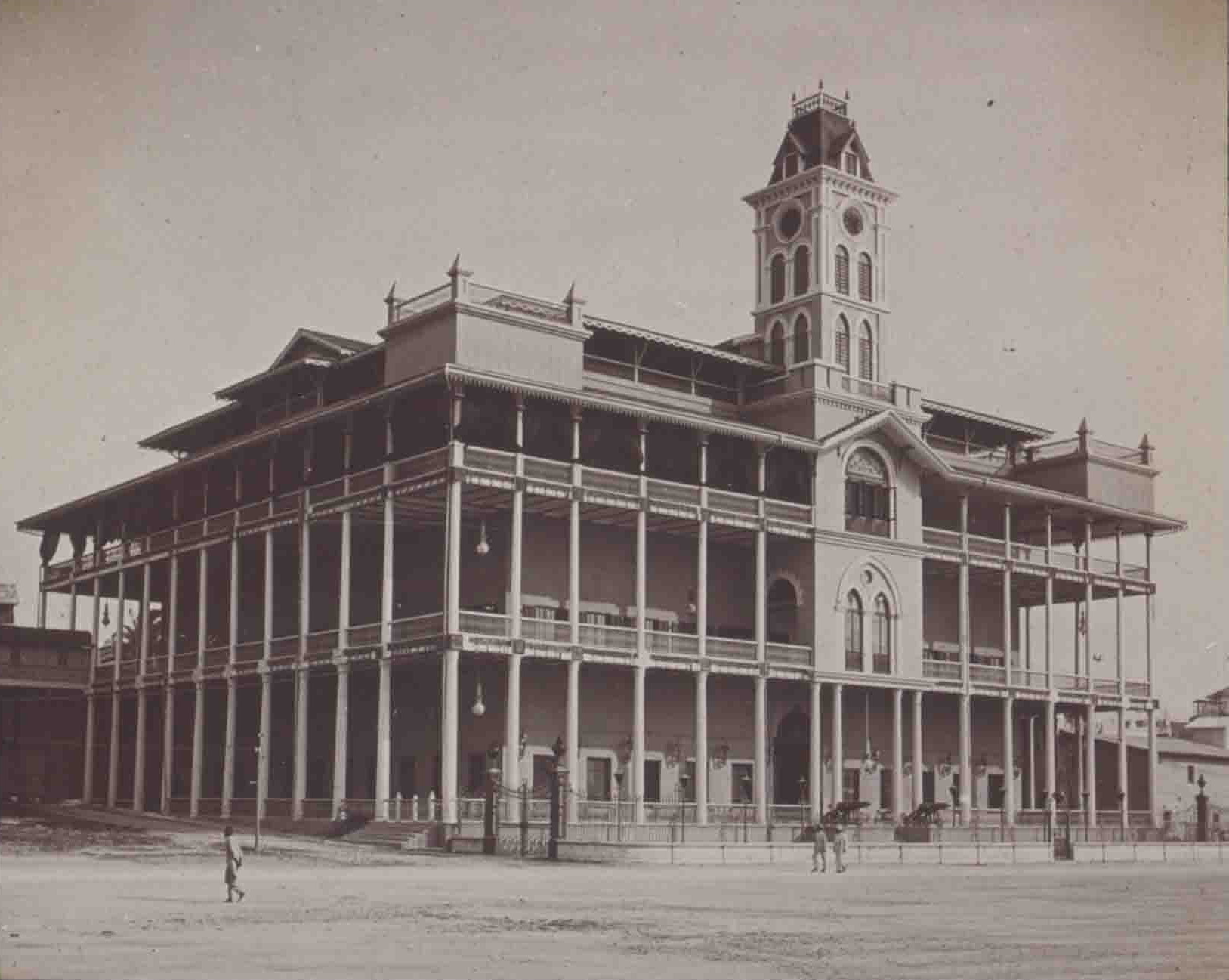
The House of Wonders in the early 20th century.

The Palace, completed in 1883, stood 39 metres tall, 50 metres long and 50 metres wide. It was originally constructed for Barghash bin Said, second Sultan of Zanzibar. It was intended as a ceremonial palace and official reception hall, celebrating modernity, and it was named "House of Wonders" because it was the first building in Zanzibar to have electricity, and also the first building in East Africa to have an elevator. The design of the palace is attributed to a British marine engineer and indeed its form introduced new architectural elements into the Zanzibar repertoire, including the wide external verandas supported by cast-iron columns, which allowed for uniquely high ceilings. The construction materials consisted of an original combination of coral rag, concrete slabs, mangrove shoots or boriti, and steel beams.

Though this building served to attest to the modernity of the Sultan, other elements made it a functional palace, such as the covered passages above street level (called wikios) which connected the House of Wonders to the two adjacent palaces Beit al-Hukum and Beit al-Sahel (now Palace Museum), allowing the royal ladies to move about unseen. The building has a large central covered courtyard or atrium surrounded by open galleries. Some of the inner doors of the palace are beautifully carved with inscriptions from the Quran. The marble floors and most of the silver decorations inside were imported from Europe.

The Sultan ostensibly kept wild animals chained up for display in front of the building and had the main door made wide enough so that he could ride an elephant through.

In front of the building once stood a lighthouse which was destroyed during the Anglo-Zanzibar War of 27 August 1896. This brief war also destroyed the Beit al-Hukum Palace and severely damaged the Beit al-Sahel Palace. The House of Wonders suffered only minor damages. During reconstruction in 1897 a new clock tower was integrated into the facade of the building. Beit al-Hukum was not rebuilt; its location was transformed into a garden, increasing the visual dominance of the House of Wonders.

The House of Wonders was only fully occupied by the Sultan and his harem after the bombardment. In 1911 it was transformed into government offices and as the main secretariat for the British governing authorities. After the Zanzibar Revolution of 1964 it was converted into a school and a museum for the ruling Afro-Shirazi Party with North Korean aid. In 1992–1994 museum development was initiated. Today it serves as a museum and it is one of Stone Town's major tourist attractions.

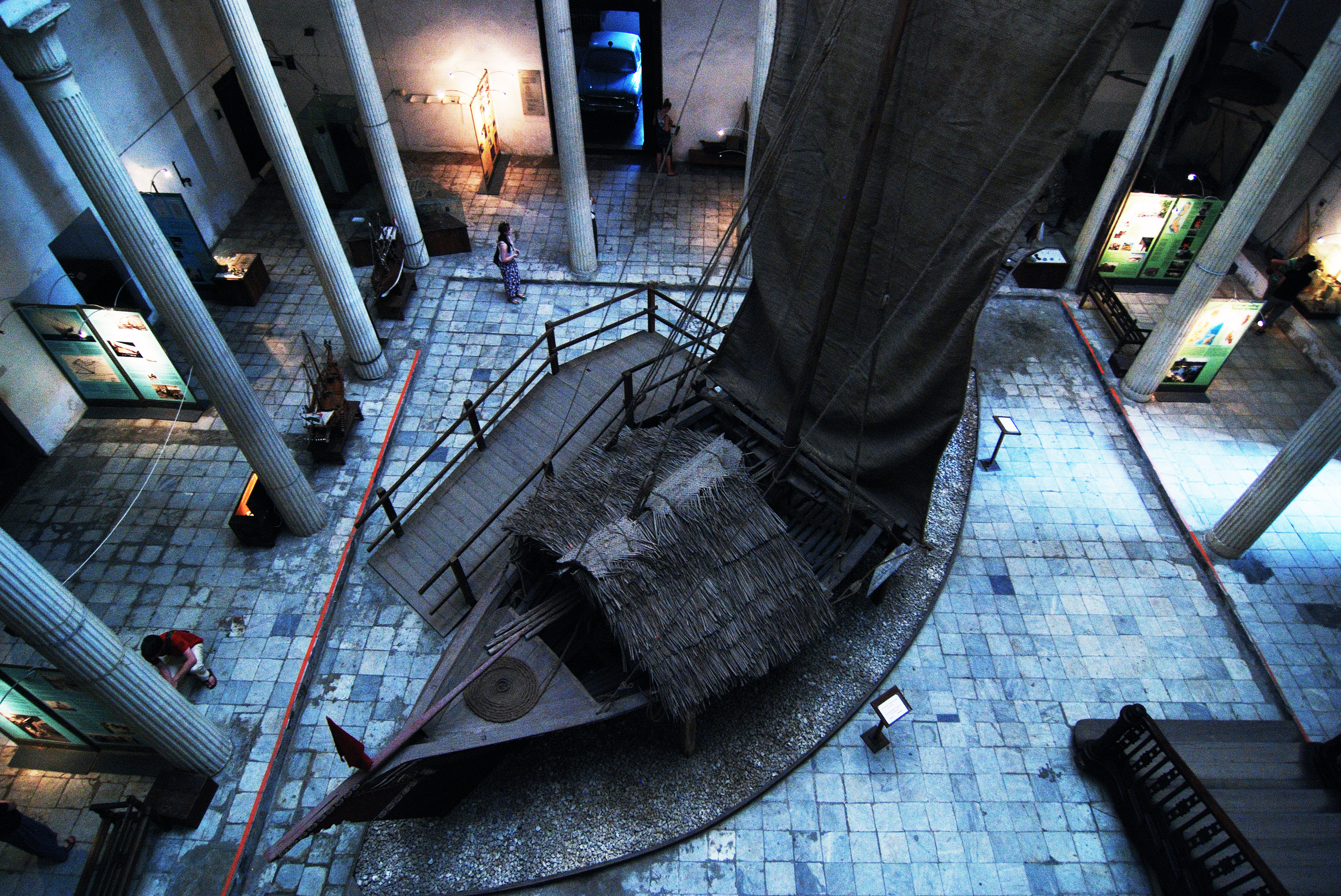
The large mtepe is the main attraction of the House of Wonders Museum. Abeid Karume's car is visible at top center.

The House of Wonders Museum, inaugurated in the early 2000s has permanent exhibits on aspects of the Swahili and Zanzibari culture as well as the East African environment. The inner courtyard is fully occupied by a mtepe (a traditional Swahili boat). Around this courtyard, developing on three floors, there are several rooms with other exhibits on a variety of subjects, including Swahili fishing tools and traditional ships, ceremonial kangas, portraits of Zanzibari Sultans and other notable Zanzibari people (including a famous portrait of slave trader Tippu Tip), elements of furniture from the Sultans' palaces, as well as information on East African biomes. One of the rooms at ground floor hosts an old car that belonged to president Abeid Karume. At the entrance of the palace there are two old Portuguese bronze cannons of the 16th century. They were captured by the Persians in 1622 and later donated to the Sultans of Oman, who brought them to Zanzibar. The biggest cannon has the emblem of king John III of Portugal. Entrance to the museum is 6.000 Tnz Shillings for adults and 4.000 Tnz Shillings for children, Zanzibar residents are admitted free (as of December 2011).

The House of Wonders had been closed due to disrepair, with large sections of the veranda and roof collapsing in 2012 and 2015, respectively, threatening the structural integrity of the rest of building. The museum has moved to another location. Despite the building currently being under a 6 million rehabilitation effort, much of its frontal facade, including the clock tower, reportedly collapsed in December 2020. This of course came as a shock and a great loss to Zanzibaris as the palace is a part of the region's history and is also a UNESCO heritage site

== Incident ==
On 25 December 2020, a mansion which was being renovated after the government of Oman had released the cost of 10 billion shillings collapsed. Four workers who were trapped inside were rescued by the rescue team, whereas 2 workers lost their lives. However, with the help of the sketchings and drawings, a similar building will be reconstructed.

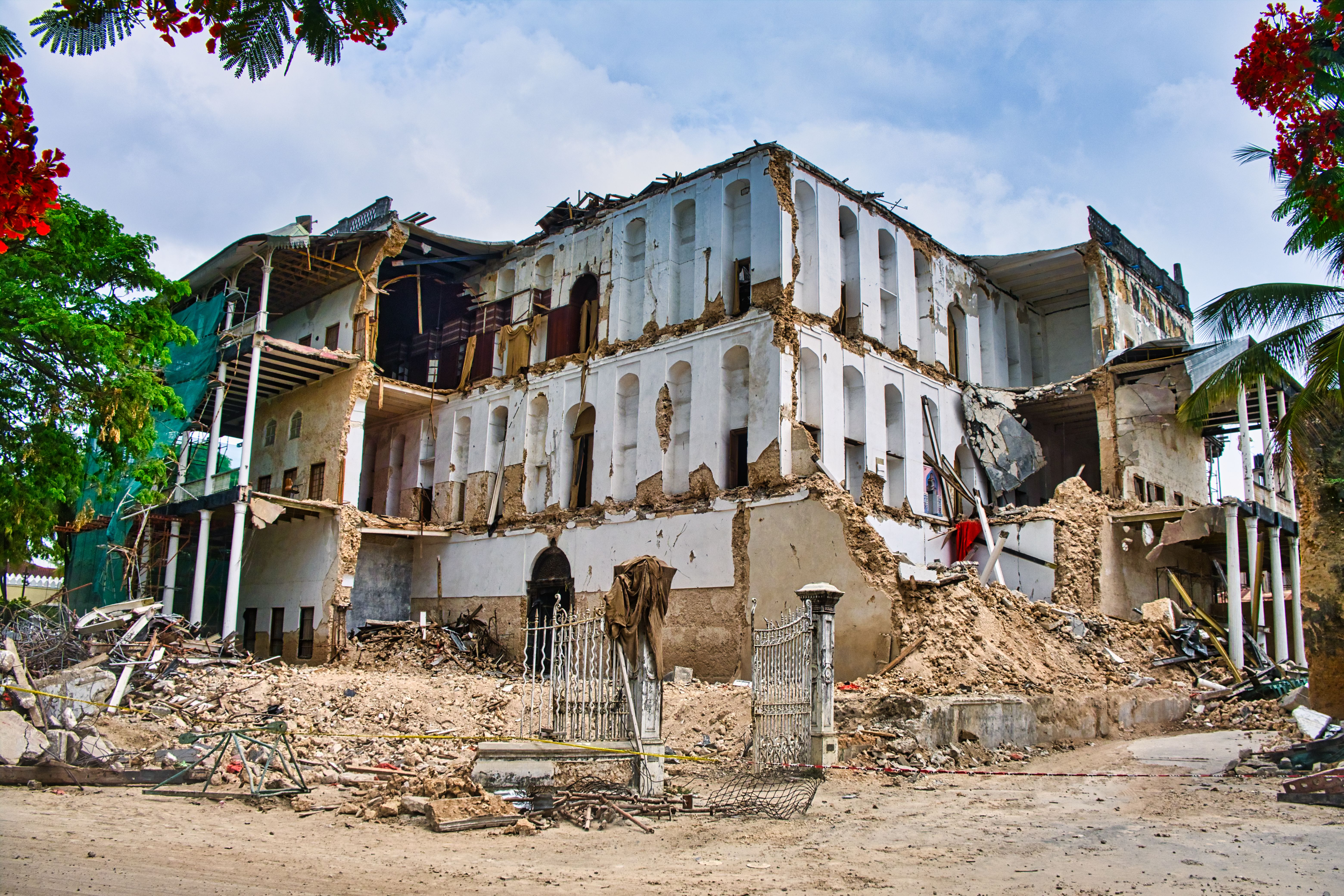
2021 photograph of the House of Wonders following the facade's collapse.
