= List of World Heritage Sites in Tanzania =

Location of World Heritage Sites in Tanzania. Red dots represent cultural sites, green dots indicate natural sites, and the blue dot is a mixed site.

The United Nations Educational, Scientific and Cultural Organization (UNESCO) World Heritage Sites are places of importance to cultural or natural heritage as described in the UNESCO World Heritage Convention, established in 1972. Cultural heritage consists of monuments (such as architectural works, monumental sculptures, or inscriptions), groups of buildings, and sites (including archaeological sites). Natural features (consisting of physical and biological formations), geological and physiographical formations (including habitats of threatened species of animals and plants), and natural sites that are important from the point of view of science, conservation, or natural beauty are defined as natural heritage. Tanzania accepted the convention on 2 August 1977. There are seven World Heritage Sites in Tanzania, with a further seven on the tentative list.

Ngorongoro Conservation Area was the first site in Tanzania to be added to the list, in 1979. The Kondoa Rock-Art Sites were listed in 2006, as the most recent inscription. Three sites are listed for cultural significance, three for natural, and Ngorongoro for both. At different points, three sites have been listed as endangered. Ngorongoro was listed between 1984 and 1989 because of decline in conservation efforts. The Ruins of Kilwa Kisiwani and Songo Mnara were listed between 2004 and 2014 because of the deterioration and decay that led to collapse of historic structures. The Selous Game Reserve is currently listed, having been designated endangered in 2014 because of unplanned tourism development, uncontrolled urban development, pollution, invasive species, and reduced water flows caused by droughts and hydroelectric dams upstream.

== World Heritage Sites ==
UNESCO lists sites under ten criteria; each entry must meet at least one of the criteria. Criteria i through vi are cultural, and vii through x are natural.

† In danger

World Heritage Sites
| Site | Image | Location (region) | Year listed | UNESCO data | Description |
|---|---|---|---|---|---|
| Ngorongoro Conservation Area | Wildebeest grazing | Arusha | 1979 | 39bis; iv, vii, viii, ix, x (mixed) | Ngorongoro Crater, after which the area is named, is the world's largest unbroken volcanic caldera and is a part of the East African Rift. It supports migration of over a million wildebeest (specimen pictured), as well as herds of zebras, Grant's gazelles, and Thomson's gazelles. The critically endangered black rhinoceros lives in the park. The site was initially listed for its natural significance. In 2010, it was extended to include the cultural aspects, namely the sites of Olduvai Gorge and Laetoli, where the remains of early hominins and fossilized footprints indicating the development of human bipedalism have been discovered. The site was listed as endangered between 1984 and 1989 because of decline in conservation efforts. |
| Ruins of Kilwa Kisiwani and Ruins of Songo Mnara | Interior of a mosque in ruins, with vaulted ceiling and bare walls | Lindi | 1981 | 144; iii (cultural) | The two port cities on small islands off the mainland were important trade centres of the Indian Ocean until the arrival of the Portuguese in the 16th century. The merchants traded with gold, pearls, silver, perfumes, as well as porcelain from China. Kilwa Kisiwani, the larger of the two, reached its peak in the 13th and 14th centuries, when it was visited by Ibn Batutta. The city is now in ruins (the interior of the Great Mosque pictured). In Songo Mnara, the ruins of mosques, a palace complex, and residential buildings have been preserved. The site was listed as endangered between 2004 and 2014 because of deterioration and partial collapse of some structures. |
| Serengeti National Park | Savanna scenery | Arusha, Mara | 1981 | 156; vii, x (natural) | Serengeti is home to one of the largest mammal migrations in the world, with vast herds of wildebeest, zebras, Thomson's gazelles, giraffes, different species of antelopes, and other herbivores moving across the savanna plains in search of grazing grounds. They are followed by large predators, including lions, leopards, cheetahs, spotted hyenas, and African wild dogs. |
| Selous Game Reserve† | A herd of elephants at a river bank | Lindi, Ruvuma, Morogoro | 1982 | 199; ix, x (natural) | Covering 50,000 km^{2} (19,000 sq mi), the reserve is one of the largest protected areas in Africa. There are several vegetation types present, the dominant being deciduous miombo woodlands. There are also gallery forests, swamps, and lowland rain forests. A prominent feature of the park are dry rivers that turn to torrents in the rainy season. The park is home to important populations of black rhinoceros, hippopotamus, and African elephant, as well as different species of antelopes and gazelles. Since 2014, the site has been listed as endangered because of unplanned tourism development, uncontrolled urban development, pollution, invasive species, and reduced water flows caused by droughts and hydroelectric dams upstream. |
| Kilimanjaro National Park | Snow covered volcano, trees in front | Kilimanjaro | 1987 | 403; vii (natural) | The national park encompasses Mount Kilimanjaro (pictured), a dormant stratovolcano and the highest point in Africa, at an elevation of 5,895 m (19,341 ft). From the bottom to the top, there are five vegetation belts on the mountain, starting with lowland savanna and montane forests, and with an alpine desert on the summit. Because of isolation, the slopes of the mountain are home to numerous endemic animal and plant species, many of them endangered. |
| Stone Town of Zanzibar | A three-storey building with verandas and a bell tower | Mjini Magharibi | 2000 | 173; ii, iii, vi (cultural) | The Stone Town, the old part of Zanzibar City, was shaped by different cultures through trade, from Arab lands, India, and Europe. It is a prime example of a Swahili trading town on the east African coast. It was also a centre of slave trade in the Swahili coast. The major buildings, constructed in rag-stone and timber, date to the 18th and 19th centuries. They include the House of Wonders (pictured), churches, mosques, the Old Fort, the Old Dispensary, and hammams. |
| Kondoa Rock-Art Sites | Rock art depicting three stylized human figures in red | Dodoma | 2006 | 1183; iii, vi (cultural) | This site comprises over 150 places with rock-art, located in rock shelters created by the forces shaping the East African Rift. The sites were occupied by hunter-gatherer and pastoralist societies for several millennia. They created rock paintings with a unique artistic expression, depicting their lives and beliefs. Human figures are depicted in a streaky style while domestic animals are rarely depicted. Some of the sites are still of ritual significance to the local communities. |

== Tentative list ==
In addition to sites inscribed on the World Heritage List, member states can maintain a list of tentative sites that they may consider for nomination. Nominations for the World Heritage List are only accepted if the site was previously listed on the tentative list. Tanzania maintains six properties on its tentative list.

* Transnational site

Tentative sites
| Site | Image | Location (region) | Year listed | UNESCO criteria | Description |
|---|---|---|---|---|---|
| Oldonyo Murwak | | Kilimanjaro | 1997 | ii, iii, iv, vi (cultural) | The Oldonyo Murwak hill is a site of ritual significance to the Maasai people of Tanzania and Kenya who gather there to perform coming of age ceremonies. |
| Gombe National Park | Two chimpanzees, mother and child | Kigoma | 1997 | (natural) | National park covers the hills along the coast of Lake Tanganyika. The area is covered by Guineo-Congolian forests and miombo woodlands. The park is mainly known for the community of chimpanzees (two pictured) that live there. They were studied by English anthropologist Jane Goodall for over thirty years. |
| Jozani - Chwaka Bay Conservation Area | A monkey in a tree canopy | Unguja South | 1997 | x (natural) | The conservation area, located south of Zanzibar City, protects different habitat types, including the coral rag forest, mangrove forest, salt marshes, and seagrass beds. The area is home to the possibly extinct Zanzibar leopard, endemic monkey Zanzibar red colobus (pictured), and Aders's duiker. |
| Eastern Arc Mountains Forests of Tanzania | Cloudy scene of forest and a mountain in the background | several sites | 2006 | (natural) | The Eastern Arc Mountains are a chain of 13 mountain ranges (Udzungwa Mountains pictured) that span eastern Tanzania and southern Kenya. They were covered by forests, but, due to human activity, forests have been mostly cleared outside the protected areas. The mountains are rich in endemic animal and plant species, resulting from the relative isolation of the mountain ranges. The part in Kenya is listed as a separate tentative site. |
| The Central Slave and Ivory Trade Route | A building with red walls and a flag in front | several sites | 2006 | (cultural) | This nomination comprises sites along the East Africa slave trade route that started in Ujiji on the shore of Lake Tanganyika and ended in Bagamoyo on the coast, from where the slaves were shipped to the markets of Zanzibar. Sites along the route include Mamboya, Mpwapwa, Kilimatinde, and Kwihara, with remains of Arab forts, plantations, and graveyards. Picture shows Livingstone's Tembe, the house where the Scottish missionary and opposer of slavery David Livingstone spent some time. Slavery in East Africa was officially banned in 1873 under British pressure, but secretly continued for several years. |
| Tendaguru Paleontological Site (TPS) | A mounded Giraffatitan skeleton in a museum | Lindi | 2022 | vii, viii (natural) | The Tendaguru Formation is a highly fossiliferous formation and Lagerstätte. The formation ranges in age from the late Middle Jurassic to the Early Cretaceous, from 165 to 130 million years ago. In the early 20th century, German researchers excavated the area and uncovered remains of invertebrates, fish, and in particular dinosaurs, producing some 80 articulated skeletons. The finds included Africa's largest known dinosaur, the Giraffatitan, which is now displayed in Berlin's Natural History Museum (pictured). |
| Geometric rock art in Lake Victoria Region of Kenya, Tanzania, and Uganda* | | Kagera, Mara, Mwanza | 2024 | iii, iv (cultural) | This nomination comprises sites with rock art in three countries around the Lake Victoria region. The paintings in red colour include geometric designs and depictions of cattle and human figures. The oldest paintings are up to 5000 years old and were attributed to pygmy hunter-gatherers that used to live in the region. In the present day, people still treat some of the rock art sites with spiritual significance and use them in rituals related to fertility and rainmaking. |

== See also ==
- Tourism in Tanzania
