= Kalambo structure =

Archaeological site in Zambia

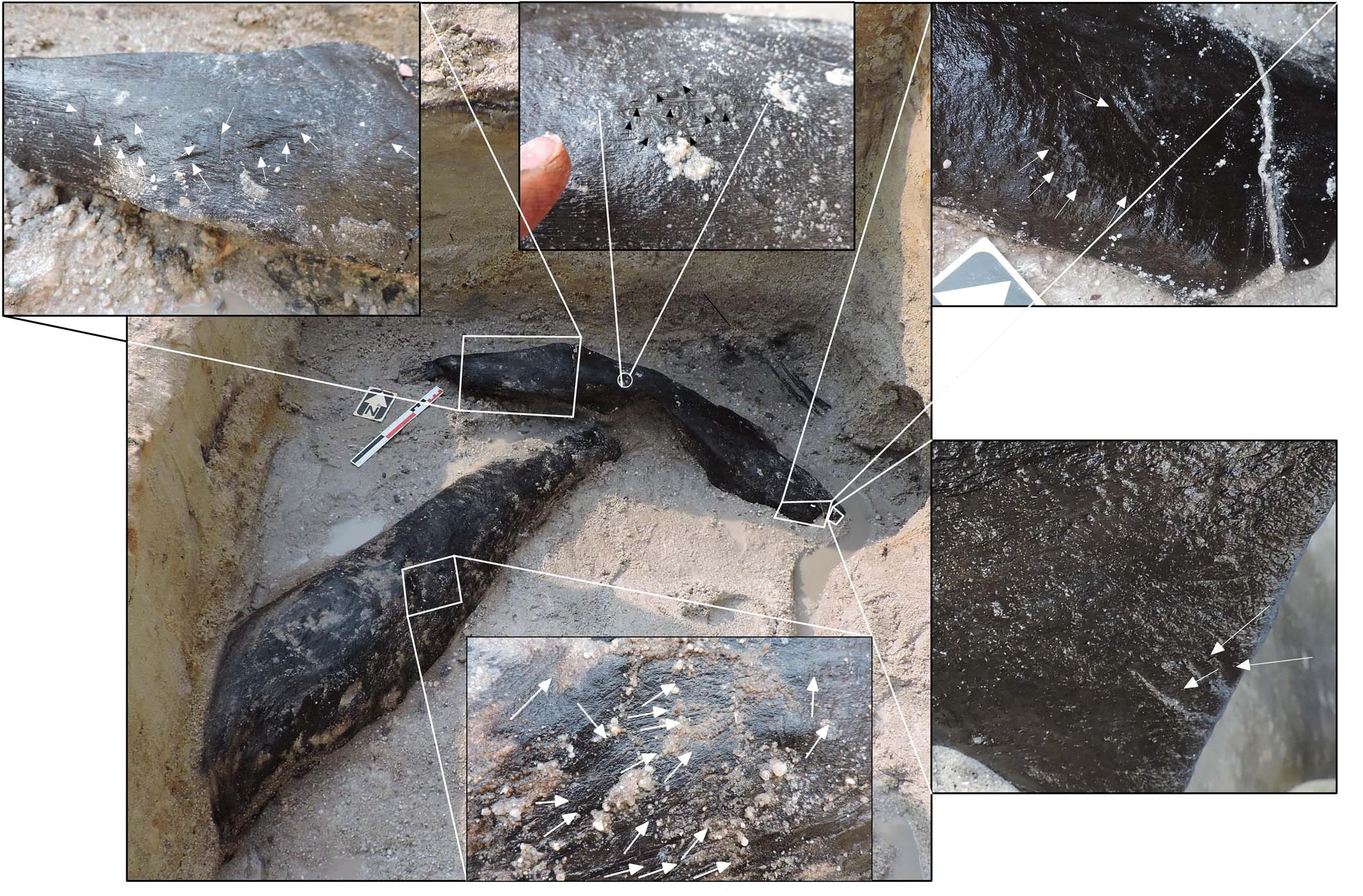
- Shaping marks on the upper surfaces and on the underlying tree trunk (arrows indicating cutmarks)
- Interactive map of Kalambo structure
- Periods: Early Stone Age
- Cultures: Acheulean
- Location: Kalambo Falls
- Region: Lake Tanganyika

History
- Built: c. 474,000 BCE
- Built by: Homo heidelbergensis?

Site notes
- Material: Wood
- Length: >141.3 cm (55.6 in)
- Excavation dates: 2019
- Archaeologists: Barham, L., Duller, G.A.T., Candy, I. et al.

The Kalambo structure is a Lower Palaeolithic wooden structure, of which two pieces have been uncovered along with other wooden tools. Discovered at the site of Kalambo Falls, Zambia, it is currently the oldest known wooden structure, determined through luminescence dating to be at least 476,000 years old, predating the earliest known appearance of Homo sapiens.

== History of discovery ==
Excavations at Kalambo Falls in the 1950s and 1960s recovered wooden artifacts of possible hominin origin, although wear and other taphonomic processes prevented scientists from ascertaining the origin of the artifacts with certainty. The area contains the Kalambo Falls Prehistoric Site.

The structure and accompanying tools were recovered in 2019 at Site BLB around the Kalambo River. The structure itself was found in area BLB5, located below the river, in association with Acheulean artifacts. The discovery was considered unusual because wood does not usually survive for so long. Geoff Duller, who was part of the team that made the discovery in 2019, said high water levels and fine sediment encasing the structure helped to preserve the wood.

== Description ==
The structure consists of two interlocking wooden logs of large-fruited bushwillow (Combretum zeyheri), connected by a notch securing one perpendicular to the other. The smaller log, measuring 141.3 cm (55.6 in) in length, has tapered ends as well as a U-shaped notch and overlies the larger log, which passes through the notch. According to Duller, the structure probably would have been part of a wooden platform used as a walkway, to keep food or firewood dry, or perhaps as a base on which to build a dwelling. The discovery could indicate that the hominins who lived at Kalambo Falls may have had a settled lifestyle, which could challenge the prevailing view that Stone Age hominins had a nomadic lifestyle.

The notch in the upper log shows evidence of having been made through scraping and adzing, with fire use also hinted at by infrared spectroscopy. The underlying trunk shows evidence of striations with V-shaped cutmarks, both at its midpoint and along the narrowed end going through the notch, also indicative of possible scraping.

Using luminescence dating, the logs were dated to 476±23 kya. Carbon dating confirmed their non-intrusive nature, reporting an age higher than the maximum range of 50 kya.

Another wooden log, showing tapered ends and a similar notch, had previously been described in Site B of Kalambo Falls, also from the Acheulean, although not conclusively identified as part of a hominid-made structure at the time.

The wooden tools found along with the structure include a wedge and a digging stick. They have been found in several areas across the BLB site, and are younger than the structure itself, having been dated to between 390,000 and 324,000 years ago.

== Implications ==
Archaeologists such as Larry Barham of the University of Liverpool, the leader of the expedition that uncovered the structure, believe that wooden tools were potentially even more common than stone tools in the Stone Age, although due to rapid decay of wood in soil, archaeologists could not find such tools. Mentioning the likely co-evolution of wooden and stone tools, they link the innovation shown by the Kalambo structure to the later invention of hafting, with several parts linked together in a single tool.

The timing of the construction of the Kalambo structure coincides with a period of forest coverage of the Kalambo River basin. Barham's team believes the high resource availability of the environment, a permanently elevated water table, and the improvement brought by constructing elevated structures above the floodplain created a habitat conducive to sustained occupation.

The discovery predates the earliest known appearance of Homo sapiens by more than 100,000 years. As no hominin remains have been discovered at Kalambo Falls, no conclusive attribution has been made, although a 300,000-year-old Homo heidelbergensis skull has been found at another Zambian site.

== See also ==
- Clacton Spear, the oldest known worked wooden weapon, dating to 400,000 years ago
