= Mlambalasi Rock Shelter =

National Historic Site of Tanzania

- Site location in Tanzania
- 7°35′27.773″S 35°30′1.696″E
- Type: Archaeological
- Location: Iringa District, Iringa Region, Tanzania
- Region: Eastern Africa

Site notes
- Excavation dates: 2006 and 2010
- Condition: Excavated
- Owner: Tanzanian Government
- Management: Antiquities Division, Ministry of Natural Resources and Tourism
- Public access: Yes

National Historic Sites of Tanzania
- Official name: Mlambalasi Rock Shelter
- Type: Pre-historic

Iringa Region, Tanzania

The Mlambalasi Rock Shelter is a historic site located in Iringa District of Iringa Region in southern Tanzania, 50 km away from Iringa City. Excavations in 2006 and 2010 by the Iringa Region Archaeological Project uncovered artifactual deposits from the Later Stone Age (LSA), the Iron Age, and the historic periods, as well as external artifacts from the Middle Stone Age (MSA). Direct dating on Achatina shell and ostrich eggshell beads indicates that the oldest human burials at Mlambalasi (and thus the earliest occupation levels) are from the terminal Pleistocene. Mlambalasi is characterized by interment in the LSA and Iron Age periods, as well as by cycles of use and abandonment.

A main rock shelter and two additional chambers comprise the Mlambalasi archaeological site. The main rock shelter is situated on the incline of a large granitic outcrop, and is divided into two connected rooms: Room 1, measuring 12x8 m, and Room 2, measuring 4x4m. Room 1 has a high roof, and entrances on the east and southwest sides. The two openings are divided by a large granite boulder which forms a partial wall. Room 2 has two entrances, a small crawl space connected to Room 1, or a west-facing entrance.

Rock shelters generally serve as identifiable and attractive landscape features for a variety of purposes. In Africa, rock shelter burials are common, and are frequently associated with opportunistic mortuary use.

Mlambalasi does not fit the traditional archaeological definition of a formal cemetery, but it has served as an important fixture for various peoples over 20,000 years in the contexts of bead making, food processing, and human burial. It provides valuable insights into the behaviors and cultures of terminal Pleistocene and early Holocene human populations in East Africa.

== Ecological context ==
The Iringa Region (a high level plateau) is about 1400 m above sea level. It lies within the Usagaran Belt, which was formed 1.9-2 billion years ago, and is characterized by quartzite and granite metamorphic rocks. Granitic outcrops, rivers, and streams feature prominently on the landscape of this region.

In terms of vegetation, the Iringa Region is classified as miombo woodland (meaning a moist savannah with tall, dense tree coverage, a long dry season, and average rainfall of 75–1000 mm per year). In terms of ecological stability and resource availability, Tanzania's Southern Highlands most probably provided refuge from the environmental stress of nearby regions (such as the East African Rift Valley) during all or some of the most recent glacial.

== Archaeological history ==
In 2002, a small-scale test excavation was conducted at Mlambalasi by Paul Msemwa, who currently serves as the director of the National Museum of Tanzania. Historic, Iron Age, and LSA occupations were identified, and Msemwa also found several Iron Age human remains fragments.

Mlambalasi and another rock shelter, Magubike, were introduced to Pamela Willoughby in 2005 by Ms. Joyce Nachilema, the District Cultural Officer for Iringa Rural. In 2006, test excavations on Mlambalasi (HwJf-02) began. The Iringa Region Archaeological Project was not aware of the previous excavation, but their excavations did not overlap with Msemwa's. Willoughby recorded surface artifacts such as Iron Age pottery, iron slag, glass beads, LSA white quartz lithics, and crypto-crystalline MSA artifacts. These excavations provided evidence for a continuous, stratified MSA and LSA record, as well as organic material.

No previous Stone Age site excavations in southern Tanzania had uncovered organic remains (such as bones, plant remains, and shells). These finds prompted a general archaeological survey and collection of surface samples spanning numerous archaeological sites from the Acheulean to present in 2008.

The 2006 excavations by Pamela Willoughby, Katie Bliittner, and Pastory Bushozi involved collecting surface material from both rooms at Mlambalasi and excavating Test pit #1, a 2x1m pit with a depth of 120 cm below surface, in the center of Room 1. Test Pit #1 yielded a historic/Iron Age deposit on top of an LSA sequence (which included Burial 1, bisected by the test pit).

Excavations were also carried out by members of the Iringa Region Archaeological Project in 2010. Six units (2x3m trenches with maximum depths of 110 cm below the floor) were excavated in 2010. The primary focus of the 2010 excavations was the recovery of the rest of the human burial and the determination of the relative locations of the excavation units from 2002 and 2006. The rest of Burial 1 was recovered, and the previous excavation units were located and mapped successfully. LSA and Iron Age materials were also discovered. A German rifle casing, manufactured in 1877, was found as well.

== Artifactual finds ==
=== Tools ===
Over time in the Iringa Region LSA, technological continuity has been noted, though the size of blanks and finished tools decreased over time, as did the diversity of rock types used. This pattern might be representative of general refinement, or an intensified reduction process over time due to external economic factors of technological adaptations. At Mlambalasi, within the rockshelter, a microlithic LSA is stratified above a macrolithic one. MSA lithics were found in disturbed deposits outside the rockshelter on the surface of the slope, and had greater variability than LSA assemblages, which has been used to evince the idea that the flexible, small, quartz-based tools of LSA assemblages were an adaptive advantage. The microlithic assemblage is dated to the Holocene, and the macrolithic level is dated to the Late Pleistocene. The macrolithic LSA is characterized by much larger retouched tools and a lower percentage of geometric microliths than the microlithic one. Raw material usage was essentially the same between excavation layers, and raw material and tool type are not related.

More specifically, the LSA lithics include geometric pieces that are 5 cm or less, most commonly made from white quartzite. The LSA lithic assemblages are characterized by low to moderate quality quartzite and quartz (including crystalline quartz). The top LSA layer at Mlambalasi is a microlithic quartz assemblage, with high rates of backed pieces made from bipolar blanks. 93% of the 44,939 artifacts analyzed were quartz, quartzite, or rock crystal, with local outcrops for each material available locally. Less frequently used were chert, granite, and metamorphic rock.

4% of the lithic assemblage was formal tools (backed pieces, scrapers, bi-facially modified pieces, burins, and points). 68% of tools were backed pieces (from 0–10 cm below surface), and the proportion of this tool type increased through time (starting at 21% 80–90 cm below surface), while the proportion of scrapers decreased from 32 to 16% over time. Cores, debitage, and a few nonflaked stones were excavated as well. The bipolar flaking method was most prominent across tools, and the lack of remaining cortex on cores (about 25%) suggests, along with a high proportion of debitage (either complete flakes/blades or angular fragments), that the occupants of Mlambalasi were manufacturing tools and reducing cores in large quantities.

=== Beads and ceramics ===
127 beads have been recovered from Mlambalasi, most of which were recovered in 2010 (besides one in 2002, and 2 in 2006). 72 are ostrich egg shell (OES), 52 are either glass or plastic, and 3 are made from unidentified organic material. Potsherds from Mlambalasi are coarse, porous, have thick and uneven cross sections, and have evidence of partial oxidation or burning. The original vessels were most likely formed by pinching or drawing, and then fired in a hearth.

Direct dates on Achatina shells (abundant at every level of excavation and in all stratified units) and OES beads indicate that the earliest occupations at Mlambalasi (associated with human burials) are from the terminal Pleistocene. This date suggestion is significant, due to the fact that archaeological sites from sub-tropical Africa (especially with human remains and organic materials) from between 200,000 and 10,000 years ago are incredibly rare.

Research has suggested that there is a relationship between OES bead assemblages and how Mlambalasi was habitually occupied. It is believed that Mlambalasi beads are indicative of a short-term dispersal camp, due to the fact that most recovered beads are completed, not in the early bead-manufacturing stage, suggesting that casual manufacture was occurring (not large-scale production). It seems like the inhabitants of Mlambalasi had free time to produce beads, but did not emphasize decorating, gifting, or communicating through beads. The OES evidence suggests that during the Stone Age, Mlambalasi was occupied by small groups that did not require highly symbolic or ritualized behavior.

In 2010, all six excavated units included evenly-distributed ceramic artifacts. 45.8% are from Iron Age / historic deposits on the surface, and were found within the first 10 cm below surface. After 40 cm below surface, the presence of potsherds drops dramatically. 58.1% of sherds are smaller than 2.5 x 2.5 cm, 40.7% are smaller than 7 x 7 cm, and most sherds are from the body of vessels. In terms of color, the sherds fall between black and dark red/gray. 98% of sherds are tempered with fine-medium sand.16.4% of sherds are decorated, mostly with coarse brush strokes or striations. Some sherds have rouletting and two rim sherds have perforated holes.

=== Rock art ===
The interior of the rock shelter, as well as multiple close by outcrops, contain undated anthropomorphic art in red pigment. Rock art (documented as Mlambalasi 1) was discovered on the main overhang of Mlambalasi in 2006. It includes two red geometric designs with white dots. In 2010, six red anthropomorphic figures and three areas of concentrated red color were discovered on a granite rock surface 20m north of the main overhang (documented as Mlambalasi 2). There is also rock art (faded red geometric paintings) at Mlambalasi 3, a nearby grantitic boulder with three shelters (two are painted). Mlambalasi 4 also bears rock art (located 100m away from Mlambalasi 3), including one rock panel with unidentifiable red paintings, and a painting of a long segmented body with short radiating lines, which Itambu believes represents a millipede.

=== Iron smithing and/or smelting ===
Artifacts associated with iron smithing and/or smelting were discovered in 2010. Slag, finished tools, nails, a furnace, and tuyere fragments were collected but have yet to be analyzed.

== Faunal remains ==
=== Non-human faunal remains ===
Highly fragmented non-human faunal remains were discovered at Mlambalasi. 2006 excavations or recent occupation levels recovered predominantly bovid and caprine remains. Cut marks, calcined bone, burnt bone, and high levels of fragmentation indicate habitual Iron Age usage of Mlambalasi as a campsite. Identification to taxa was not possible for most of the (predominantly) skull and limb elements discovered, besides the bovid and caprine remains.

=== Human remains ===
Two intermixed burials are definitively associated with the LSA: Burial 1 (one small, middle-aged adult of unknown sex) and Burial 2 (one juvenile). Highly fragmented remains may indicate a second LSA adult (Burial 4). Burial 3 consists of the skeletal material of an Iron Age adult. Flexed burial postures date to 15,000 years ago in Tanzania, and Mlambalasi is the oldest evidence in the Iringa Region. All remains discovered are highly fragmented, with evidence of damage from livestock corralled by local Maasai groups, moving water, insects, and heat damage.

B-1 (extended in supine position, with both arms extended and the skull leaning right, and with legs most likely flexed), is from 70 to 90 cm below surface, near the back of the rockshelter. Despite the absence of a formal burial pit / cairn, cobbles and boulders from the roof covered B-1, and the body was found with three OES beads, dating to the terminal Pleistocene. The head of the body was most likely placed intentionally beneath the overhang of a large roof boulder. It has been determined that the individual from B-1 was either a female or a small male. Many carious lesions are present skeletally, as well as potential pathological changes on the right temple.

B-2 (the second LSA individual found within B-1) remains include a partial juvenile manubrium. A mostly complete, adult upper jaw was also found, with indications of advanced dental disease that may represent a third LSA individual (B-4). B-3 (found near the Iron Age smelting furnace at the entrance of the rockshelter) includes a fragmentary skull, upper arms, and a partial thorax (possibly from a female adult).

Despite being fragmentary, the skeletons from Mlambalasi contribute to archaeology's limited knowledge of LSA humans. The atypical body size of the adult skeleton as well as evidence of advanced dental disease and pathological changes provide a unique insight to Later Pleistocene African populations. Compared to previously documented East African LSA skeletal remains, the Mlambalasi skeletons are unusual, indicating a need for further study in this area.

== Colonial significance ==
The rifle bullet casing discovered during the 2010 excavations was analyzed and determined to be manufactured in 1887 in Germany, directly linking it to the German colonization of Tanganyika. During this colonization, the Iringa region was a primary center of anti-colonial resistance. Mkwawa, the Paramount Chief of the Hehe people of Iringa, led the local resistance against German colonial rule during this period. It is thought that Mkwawa used Mlambalasi as a hideout, and killed himself there to avoid German capture in 1898. German allies discovered Mkwawa's body and decapitated it. The rest of his body was buried at the site, a few meters away from the rockshelter. A memorial monument was built in 1998 to commemorate the hundredth anniversary of Mkwawa's death.
