= Shamiani =

National Historic Site of Tanzania

- Location within Tanzania
- 5°26′17.52″S 39°44′7.44″E
- Type: Settlement
- Cultures: Swahili
- Location: Mkoani District, Pemba South Region, Tanzania

History
- Built: 14th century CE
- Abandoned: 16th century CE

Site notes
- Material: Coral rag
- Architectural styles: Swahili & Islamic
- Condition: Endangered
- Owner: Tanzanian Government
- Management: Antiquities Division, Ministry of Natural Resources and Tourism

National Historic Sites of Tanzania
- Official name: Shamiani Ruins Historic Site
- Type: Cultural

Shamiani (Magofu ya mji wa kale wa Shamiani in Swahili ) is a protected historic site located inside Mkoani District of Pemba South Region in Tanzania. The site is home to partially excavated, abandoned medieval Swahili ruins with a brief occupation period from about 14th to 16th century.
