= Chole Island Ruins =

National Historic Site of Tanzania

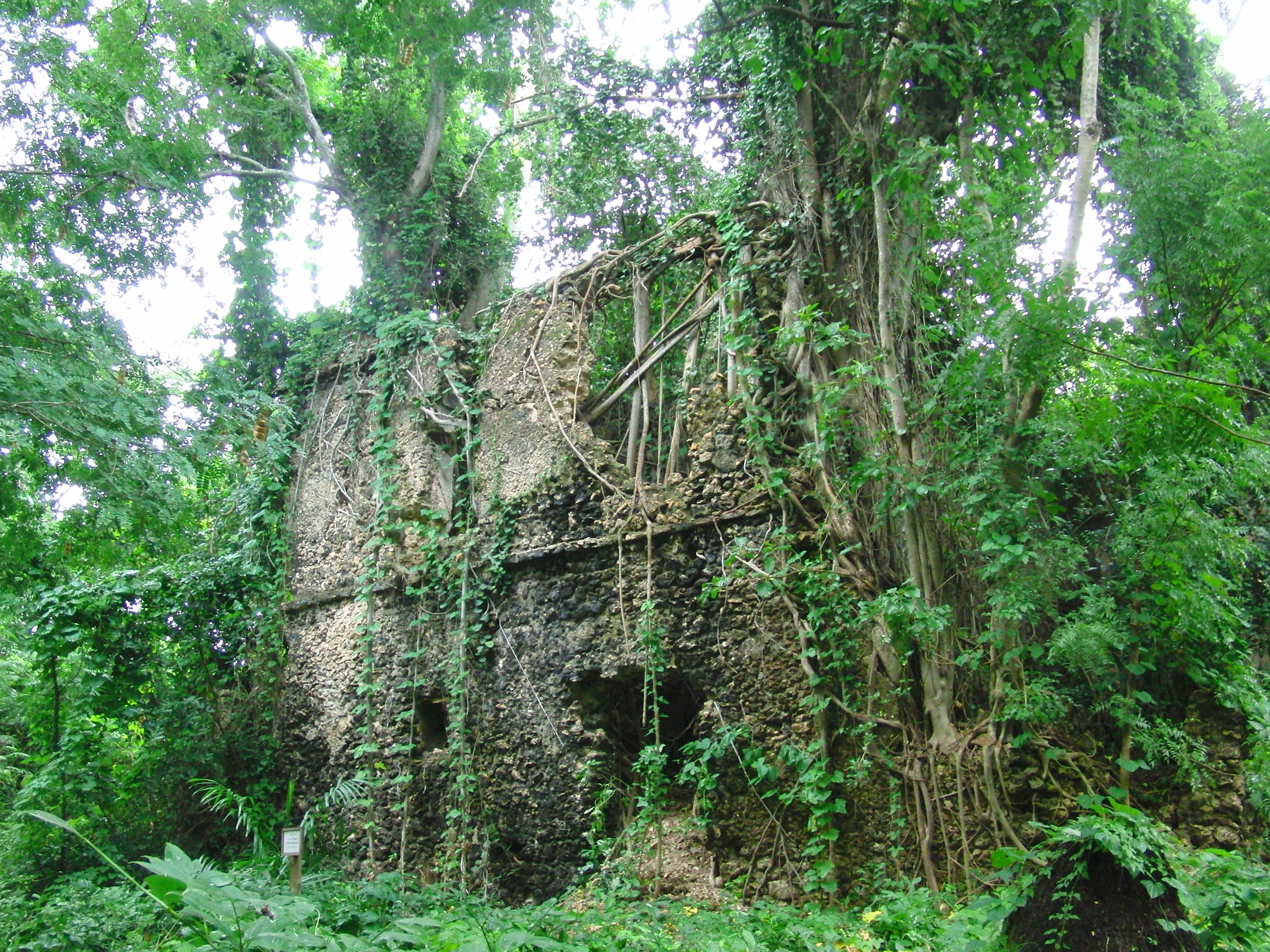
- Ruins on Chole Island

- Location within Tanzania
- 7°52′11.64″S 39°45′18″E
- Type: Settlement
- Location: Chole Island of Jibondo ward, Mafia District, Pwani Region, Tanzania

Site notes
- Material: Coral rag
- Architectural style: Swahili
- Condition: Endangered
- Owner: Tanzanian Government
- Management: Antiquities Division, Ministry of Natural Resources and Tourism

National Historic Sites of Tanzania
- Official name: Chole Island Historic Site
- Type: Cultural

Chole Island Ruins (Magofu ya kale ya Kisiwa cha Chole in Swahili ) is a national historic site located on Chole Island of Jibondo ward in Mafia District of Pwani Region in Tanzania. The ruined mosques are from the 14th century, whereas other remains that have survived are often considerably more recent, from the 18th century. Even though the remains are in disrepair and are difficult to navigate, the largest standing ruin is a massive double-story building with stone staircases and a labyrinth of anterooms.
