= Katuruka =

National Historic Site of Tanzania

- Location within Tanzania
- 1°55′S 31°18′E
- Type: Settlement
- Location: Kagera Region, Tanzania

Site notes
- Condition: Endangered
- Owner: Tanzanian Government
- Management: Antiquities Division, Ministry of Natural Resources and Tourism

National Historic Sites of Tanzania
- Official name: Katuruka Iron Age Site
- Type: Cultural

Katuruka (Eneo la kale la Katuruka in Swahili ) is an archaeological site dated to the Iron Age. The pottery found in the site appears to be of the Urewe type, which is also found in other regions of the Lake Victoria basin. Additionally, there is proof that advanced iron smelting technology existed in the last few millennia BC. It is the first known instance of ironworking in central and southern Africa. The site is located in Kagera Region of Tanzania.
