= Nyabusora =

Archaeological site in Tanzania

- Location within Tanzania
- 1°55′S 31°18′E
- Type: Settlement
- Location: Kagera Region, Tanzania

Site notes
- Condition: Endangered
- Owner: Tanzanian Government
- Management: Antiquities Division, Ministry of Natural Resources and Tourism

National Historic Sites of Tanzania
- Official name: Nyabusora Stone Age Site
- Type: Cultural

Nyabusora (Eneo la kale la Nyabusora in Swahili ) is an archaeological site dated to the Stone Age. The site is located in Kagera Region of Tanzania.
