= Uvinza Salt Works =

National Historic Site of Tanzania

Coordinates: 4°58′44.04″S 30°17′33.72″E

Uvinza Salt Works Site
- Location within Tanzania
- Type: Settlement
- Cultures: Vinza
- Location: Uvinza District, Kigoma Region, Tanzania

Site notes
- Condition: Endangered
- Owner: Tanzanian Government
- Management: Antiquities Division, Ministry of Natural Resources and Tourism

National Historic Sites of Tanzania
- Official name: Uvinza Salt Works Historic Site
- Type: Cultural

Uvinza Salt Works (Eneo la uchimbaji wa chumvi mawe ya Uvinza in Swahili ) are salt mines that have been in used since the Iron Age. There are numerous brine springs in the area. The site is located in the town of Uvinza in Uvinza District of Kigoma Region in Tanzania.
