= National Historic Sites of Tanzania =

List of National Heritage Sites of Tanzania

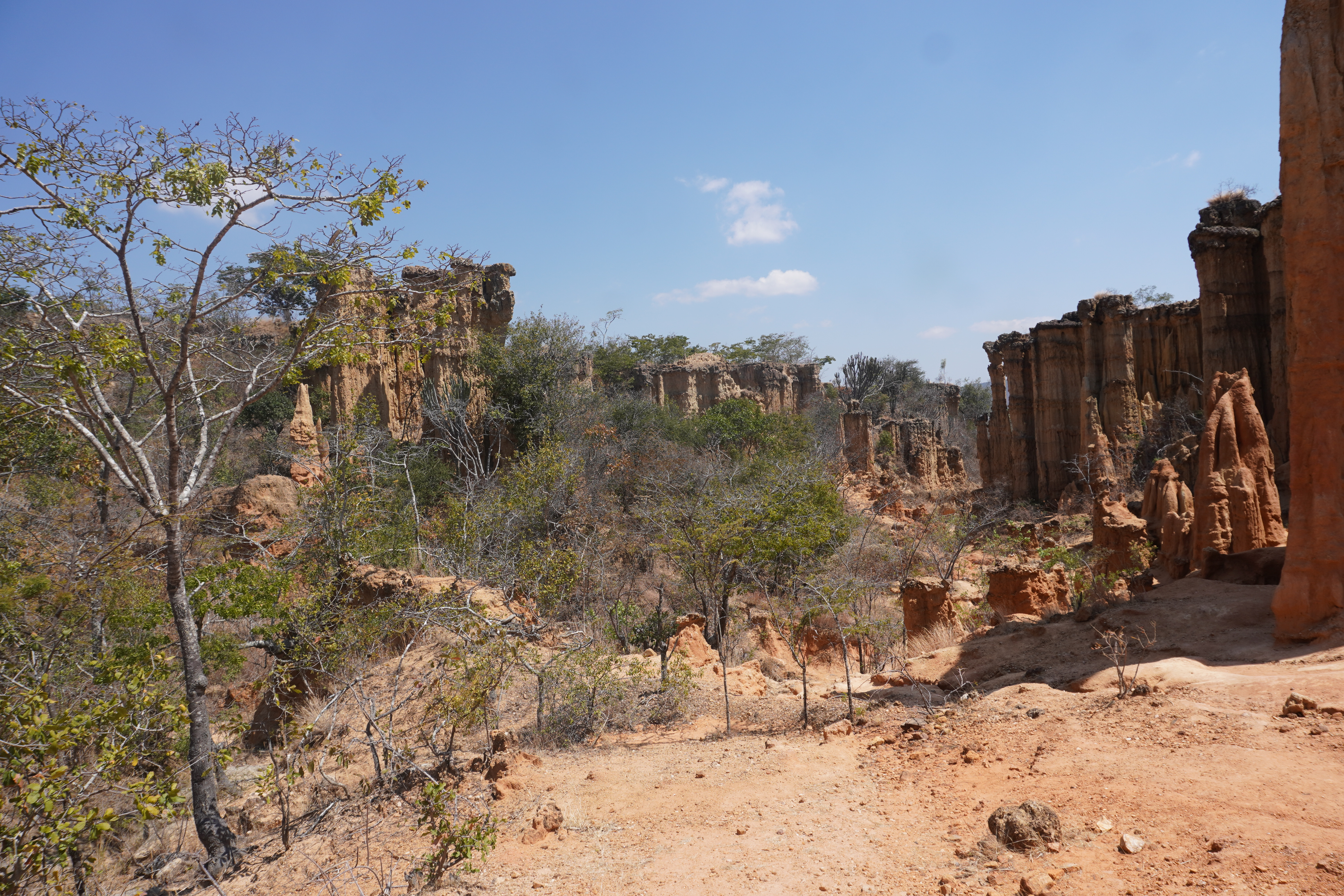
Ismila Stone Age Site

National Historic Sites of Tanzania is an official list of places in Tanzania that have been designated as National Historic Sites as per the Ministry of Natural Resources and Tourism of Tanzania under the Antiquities Division. The list is not complete and is currently being updated.

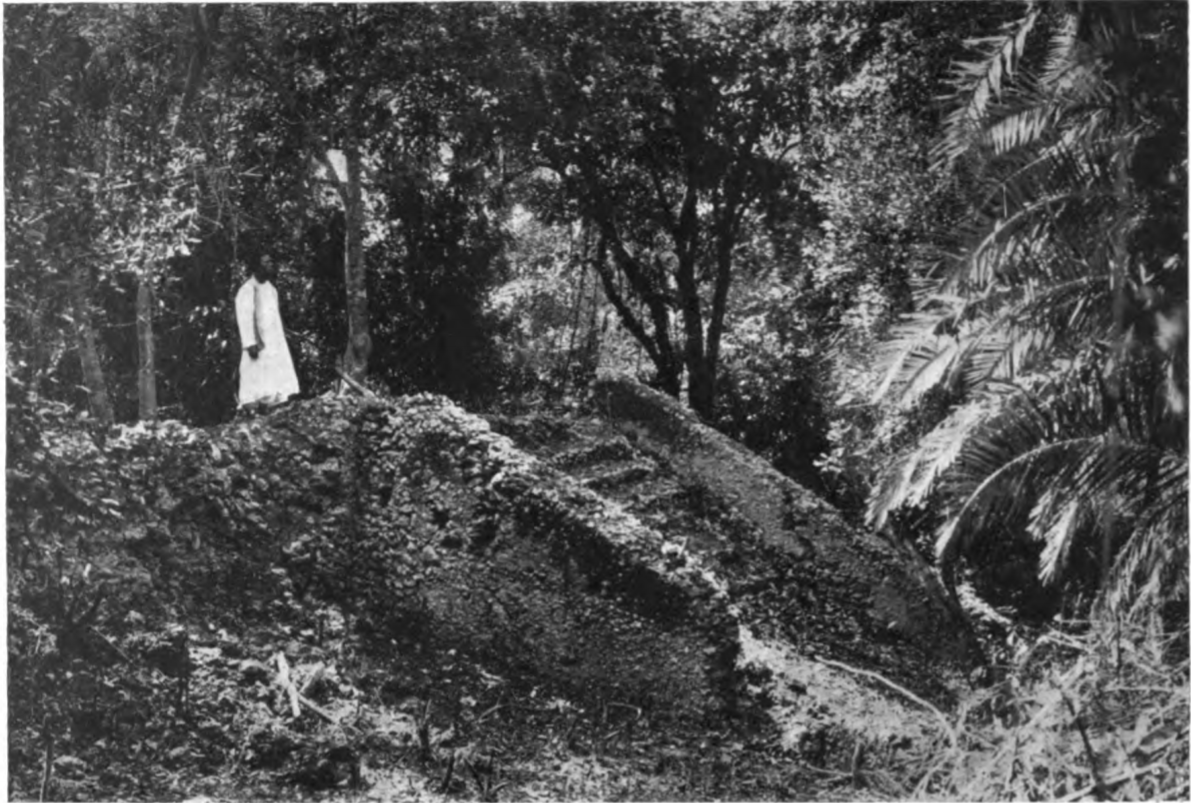
Pujini Ruins in Chake Chake District in South Pemba.

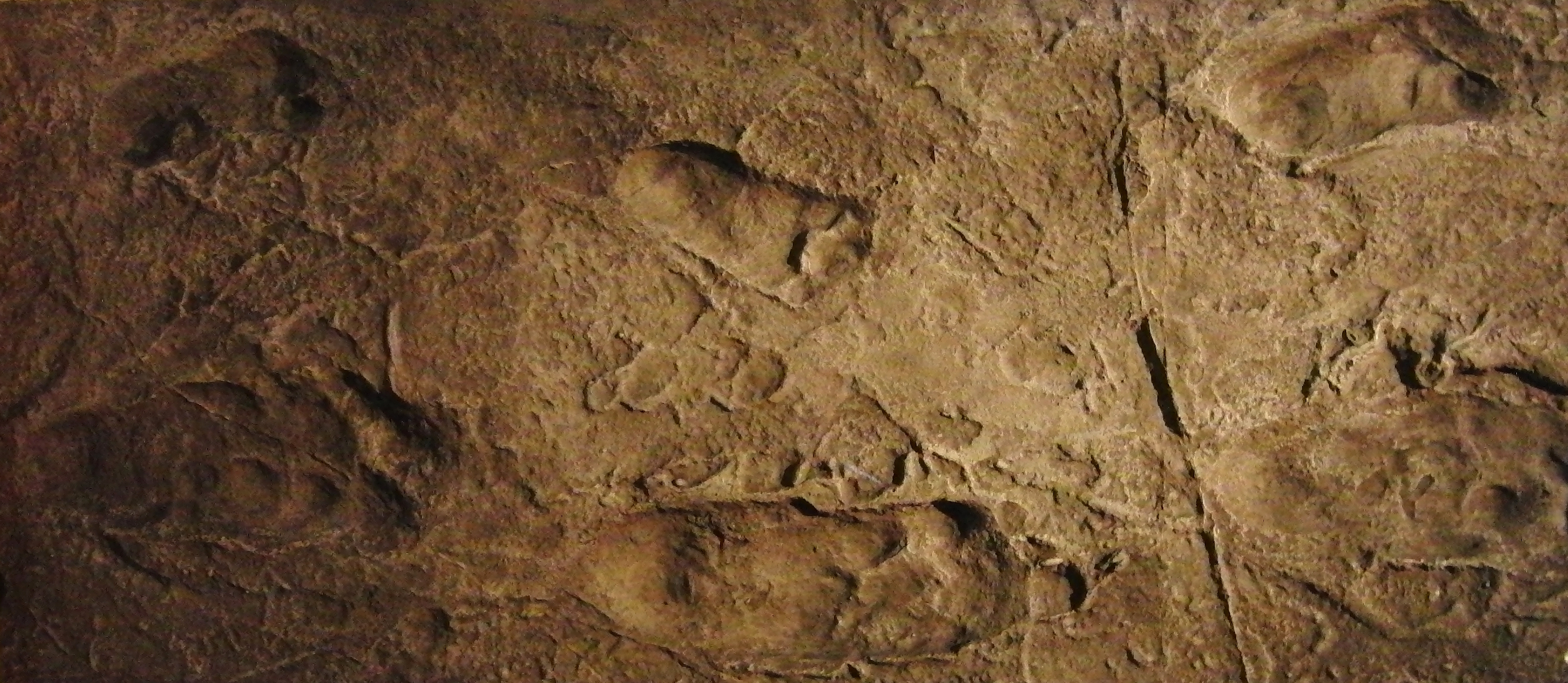
Laetoli footprints in Arusha Region

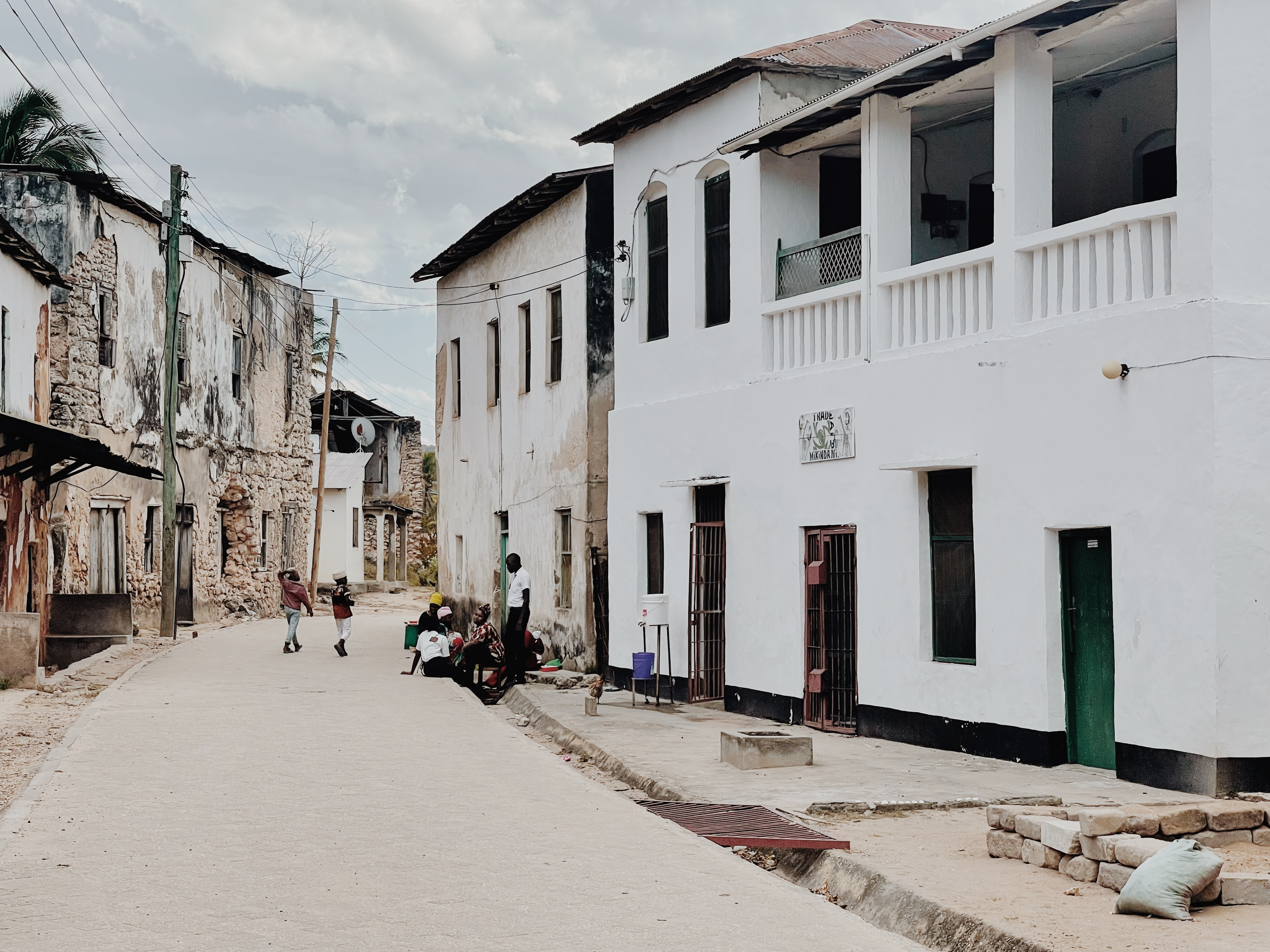
Mikindani in Mtwara Region

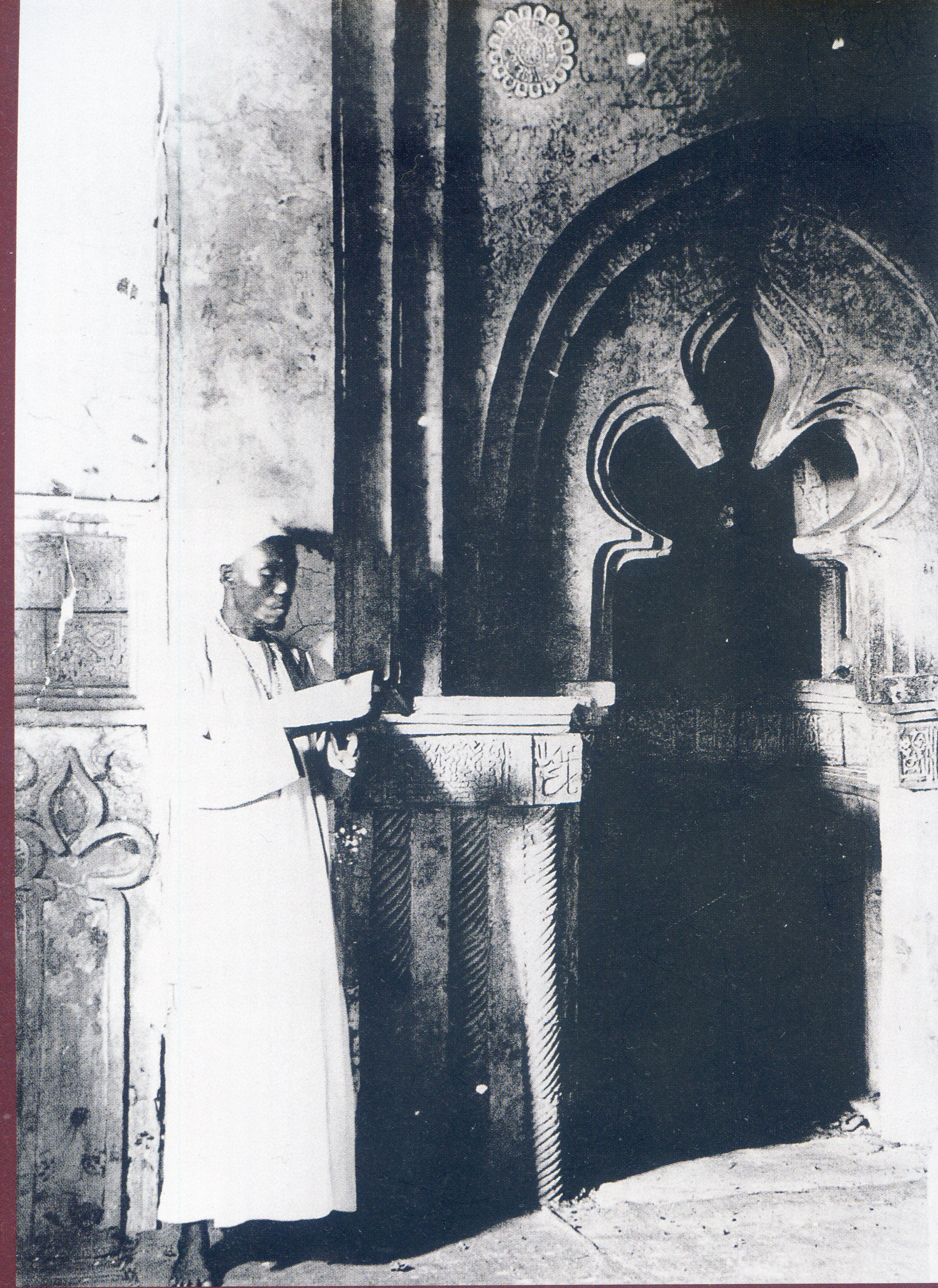
Kizimkazi Mosque in Dimbani, Kusini District, South Zanzibar.

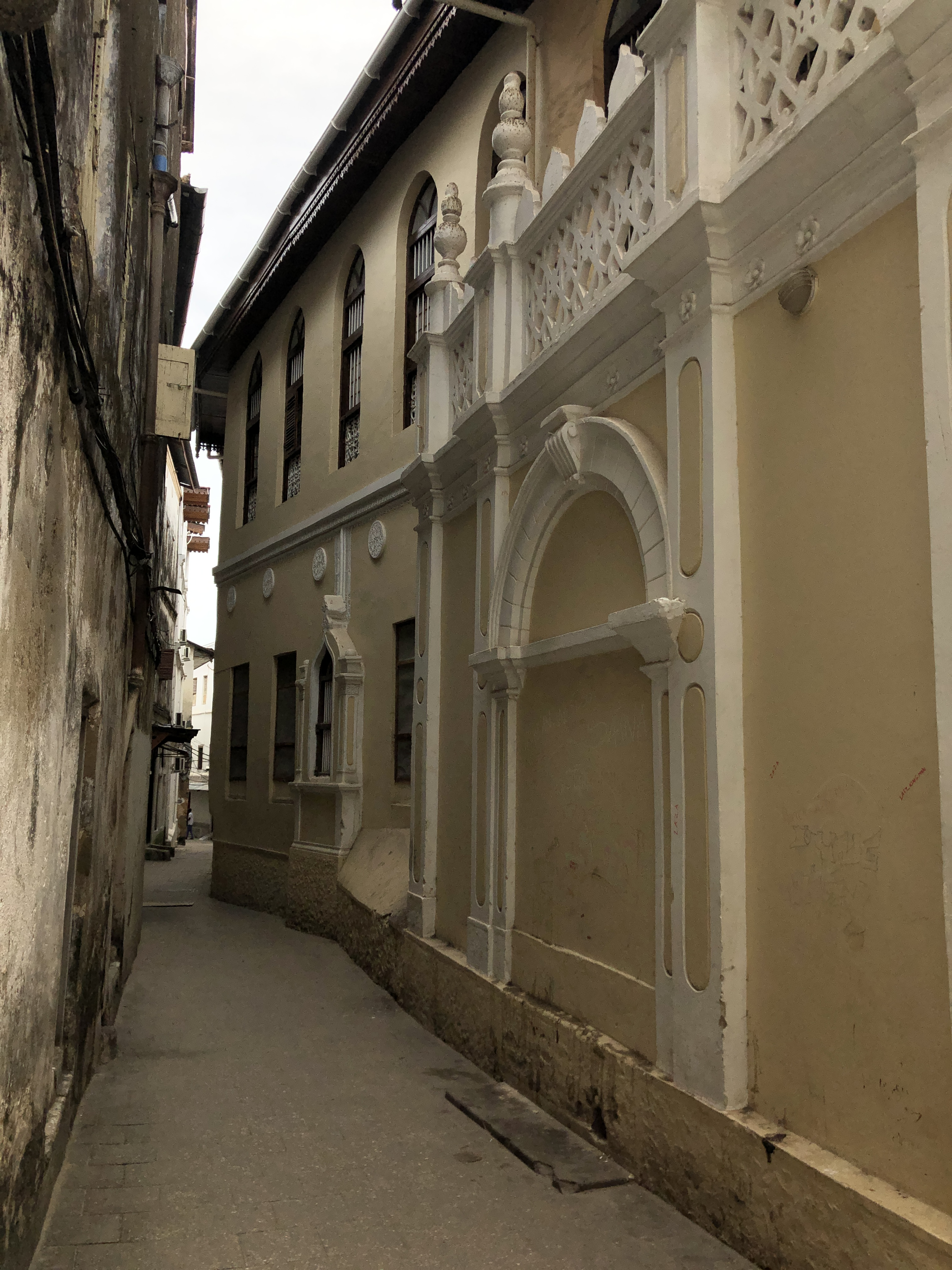
Stone Town in Zanzibar City

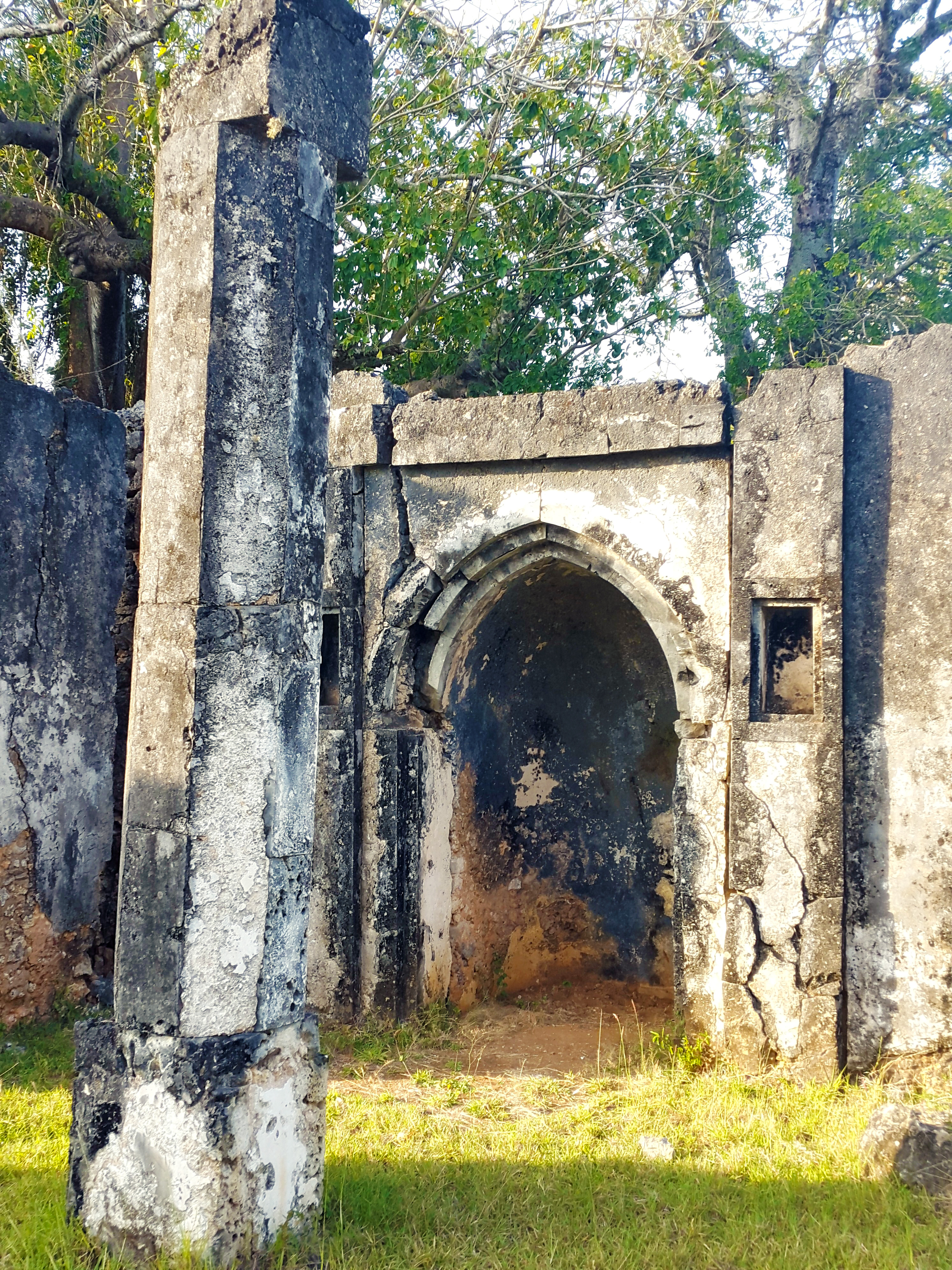
Tongoni Ruins in Tanga District of Tanga Region.

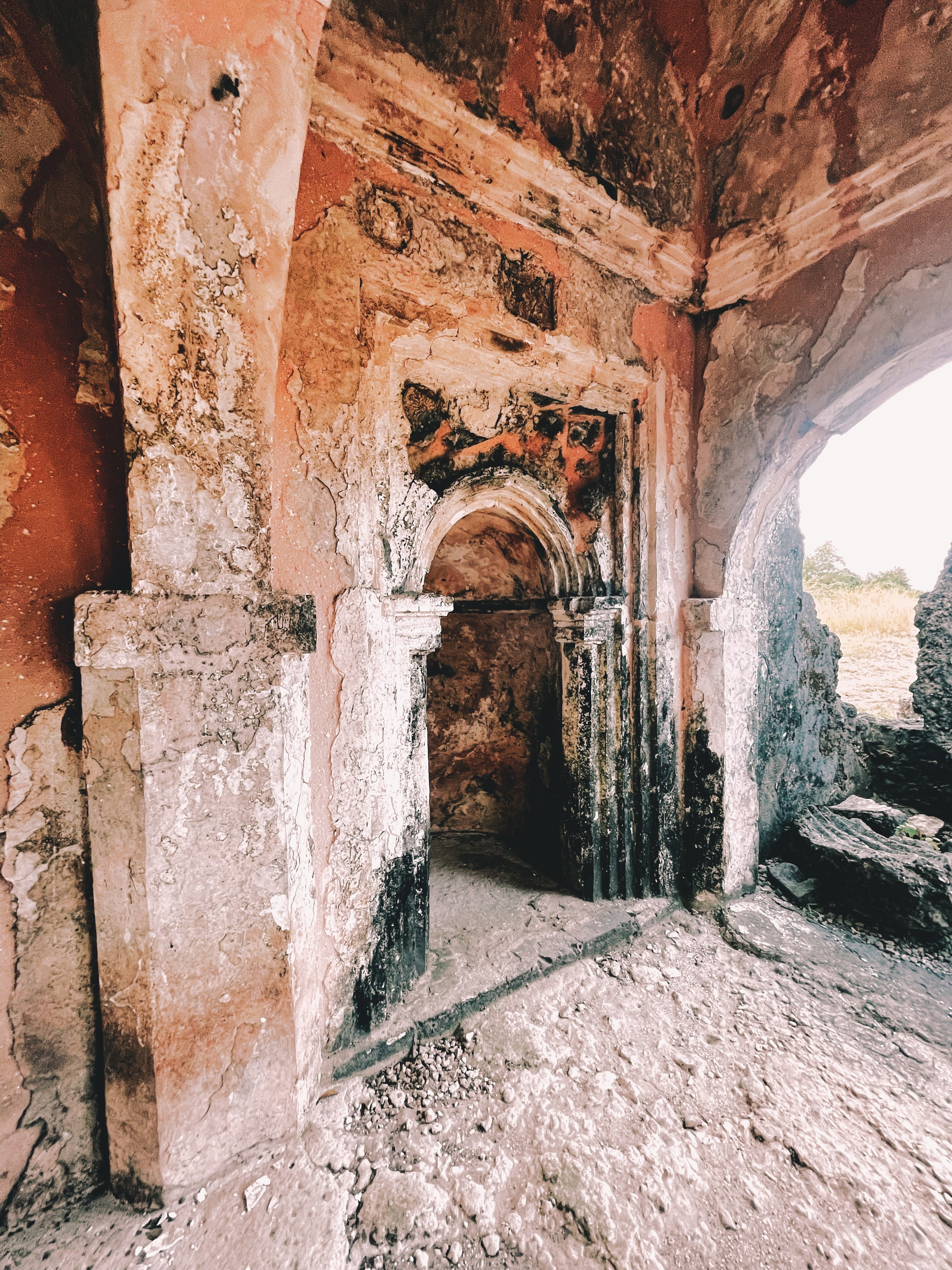
Kilwa Kisiwani ruins in Kilwa District in Lindi Region.

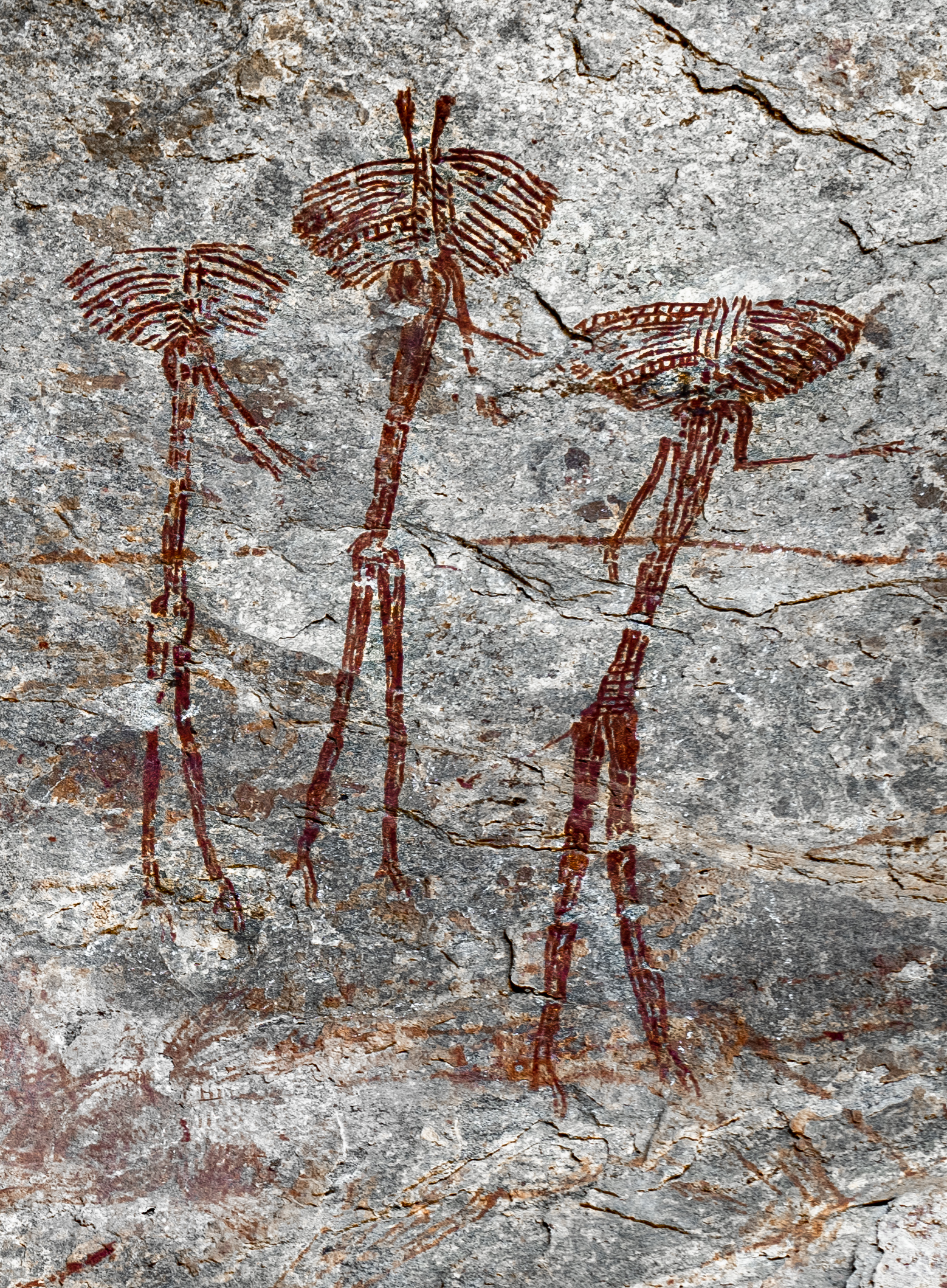
Kondoa Rock-Art in Dodoma Region

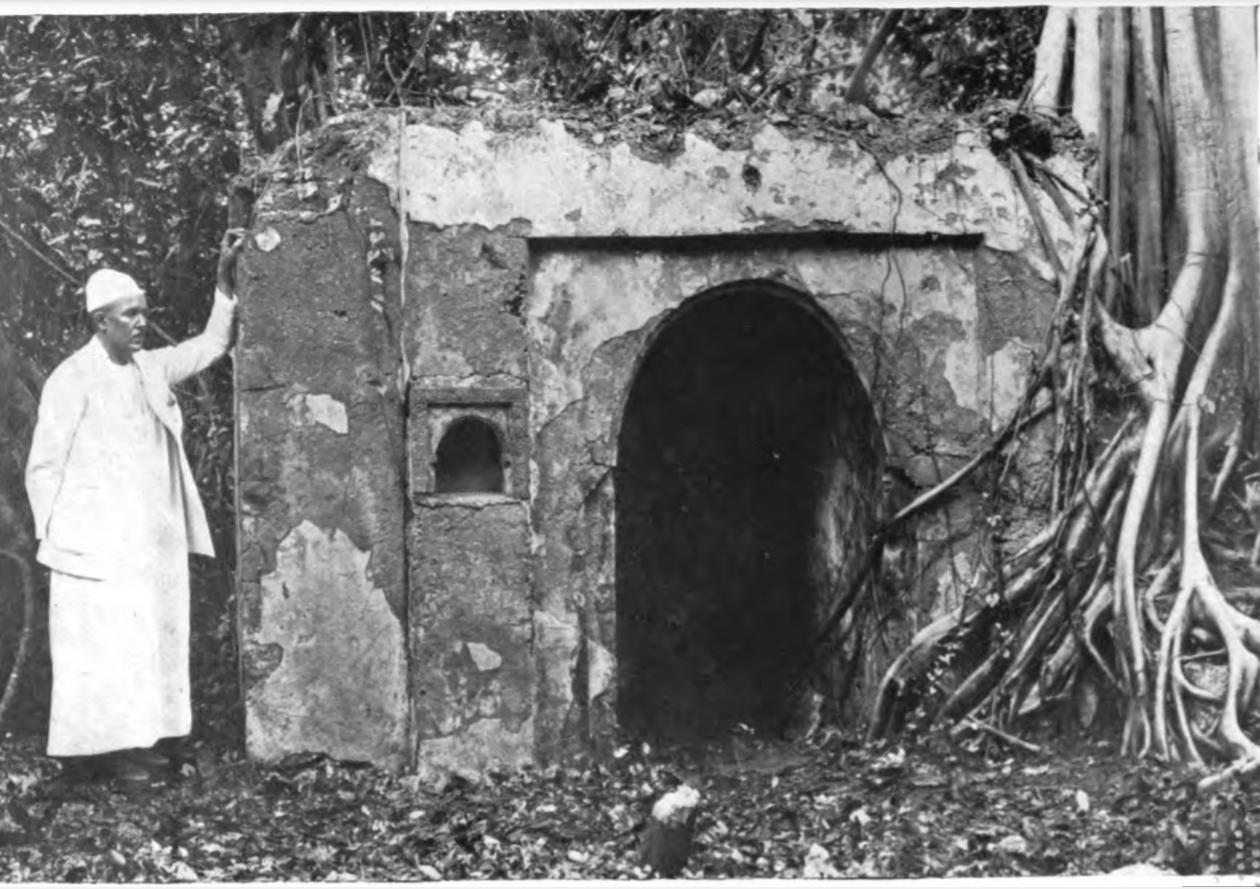
Msuka Mjini Ruins Mosque in Micheweni District in North Pemba.

== History ==
The National Historical Sites was created by the colonial British Mandate in Tanganyika Territory in 1937 as the Monuments Preservation Ordinance of 1937. In 1957, it was handed over to the Ministry of Education as the Antiquities Division with the office based in Bagamoyo, Pwani Region. The Office was moved to Dar es Salaam in 1960. In 1964, four years after independence, the national assembly of Tanzania passed the Antiquities Act No.10 of 1964 replacing the Mounuments Preservation Ordinance of 1937. The 1964 Act was amended in 1979 by the Antiquities Act No.22 of 1979, then that was replaced by the Objects Monuments Act No.13 of 1981.

== List of National Historic Sites ==
Below is the list of Tanzania's National Historic Sites. There are additional sites on the list.

Arusha Region:

- Olduvai Gorge, (Hominid Fossils)
- Laetoli, (Hominid Fossils)
- Engaruka, (Irrigation Furrows)
- Nasera Rockshelter,(Stone Age Site)
- Mumba Cave (Stone Age and Iron Age)
- Peninj, (Hominid Fossils)

Dar es Salaam Region:

- Kunduchi Ruins (Medieval Swahili Settlement)
- Kimbiji Ruins (Medieval Swahili Settlement)
- Mbuamaji (Medieval Swahili Settlement)
- Mbutu Bandarini (Medieval Swahili Settlement)

Dodoma Region:

- Kondoa Irangi Rock Paintings
- Bahi Rock-Art Sites

Iringa Region:

- Isimila Stone Age Site
- Kalenga (19th Century Capital and Defences)
- Mlambalasi

Kagera Region:

- Kemondo Iron Age Sites
- Katuruka (Iron Age Site)
- Nyabusora (Stone Age Site)
- Bweranyange

Kigoma Region:

- Ujiji
- Uvinza Salt Works (Iron Age Site)

Kilimanjaro Region:

- Marangu Defences (19th Century cave sanctuaries)

Lindi Region:

- Kilwa Kisiwani (Medieval Swahili Settlement)
- Kivinje (Medieval Swahili Settlement)
- Songo Mnara Ruins (Medieval Swahili Settlement)
- Sanje ya Kati (Medieval Swahili Settlement)
- Lindi Historic Town

Manyara Region:

- Luxmanda (Neolithic Site)

Mtwara Region:

- Mikindani Historic Town

Pwani Region:

- Bagamoyo Historic Town Historic Town
- Kaole Ruins (Medieval Swahili Settlement)
- Chole (Medieval Swahili Settlement)
- Kisimani Mafia (Medieval Swahili Settlement)
- Kua Ruins (Medieval Swahili Settlement)

Rukwa Region:

- Kalambo Falls Prehistoric Site (Stone Age and Iron Age Site)

Tabora Region:

- Livingstone's Tembe

Tanga Region:

- Tongoni Ruins, (Medieval Swahili Settlement)
- Tanga Island, (Medieval Swahili Settlement)
- Vugha, (Kilindi Dynasty Capital)
- Yambe Island (Medieval Swahili Settlement)
- Muhembo (Medieval Swahili Settlement)

Zanzibar North Region:

- Tumbatu (Medieval Swahili Settlement)

Zanzibar Urban West Region:

- Stonetown (Medieval Swahili Settlement)

Zanzibar South Region:

- Unguja Ukuu (Medieval Swahili Settlement)
- Kuumbi Cave
- Kizimkazi Mosque (Medieval Swahili Settlement)

North Pemba Region:

- Chwaka (Medieval Swahili Settlement)
- Mtambwe Mkuu (Medieval Swahili Settlement)
- Tumbe (Medieval Swahili Settlement)
- Mkia wa Ng'ombe (Medieval Swahili Settlement)
- Msuka Mjini (Medieval Swahili Settlement)
- Mduuni (Medieval Swahili Settlement)
- Kichokochwe Ruins (Medieval Swahili Settlement)

South Pemba Region:

- Mkama Ndume (Medieval Swahili Settlement)
- Pujini Ruins (Medieval Swahili Settlement)
- Chambani (Medieval Swahili Settlement)
- Ras Mkumbuu (Medieval Swahili Settlement)
- Shamiani (Medieval Swahili Settlement)

Singida region

- Early Stone Age sites
- Middle Stone Age sites
- Later Stone Age sites
- Rock Art sites

== Leadership and Ministries ==
The division of antiquities has been under the leadership of the following people:

1957-1968: Neville Chittick, Curator 1968-1981: Amin Aza Mutri, Director 1981-1985: Simon S.A. Waane, Head of Section 1985-1997: Simon S.A. Waane, Director 1997-2000: Doantius M.K. Kamamba, Ag Director 2000–Present: Donatious M/K. Kamamba, Director

The department has been under the following ministries: 1957-1962: Ministry of Education 1962-1964: Ministry of National culture and Youth 1964-1967: The President's Office 1967-1968: Ministry of Regional Administration 1968-1980: Ministry of National Education 1980-1984: Ministry of Information and Culture 1984-1999: Ministry of Community Development, Culture, Youth and Sports 1999–Present: Ministry of Natural Resources and Tourism.
