= Marangu Defences =

National Historic Site of Tanzania

- Location within Tanzania
- 3°17′41.892″S 37°30′28.08″E
- Type: Settlement
- Cultures: Chaga
- Location: Moshi District, Kilimanjaro Region, Tanzania

History
- Built: 18th century CE

Site notes
- Condition: Endangered
- Owner: Tanzanian Government
- Management: Antiquities Division, Ministry of Natural Resources and Tourism

National Historic Sites of Tanzania
- Official name: Marangu Defences Historic Site
- Type: Cultural

Marangu Defences or Chagga Caves (Mapango ya Uchaggani in Swahili ) are a man-made defence cave system that was erected in the late 18th century as defence of the Chaga from Maasai raids and expanded the system in the late 19th century as part of the Chagga resistance from the German occupation. The caves are located in various locations within Moshi District of Kilimanjaro Region in Tanzania.
