= Kivinje =

National Historic Site of Tanzania

Kilwa Kivinje
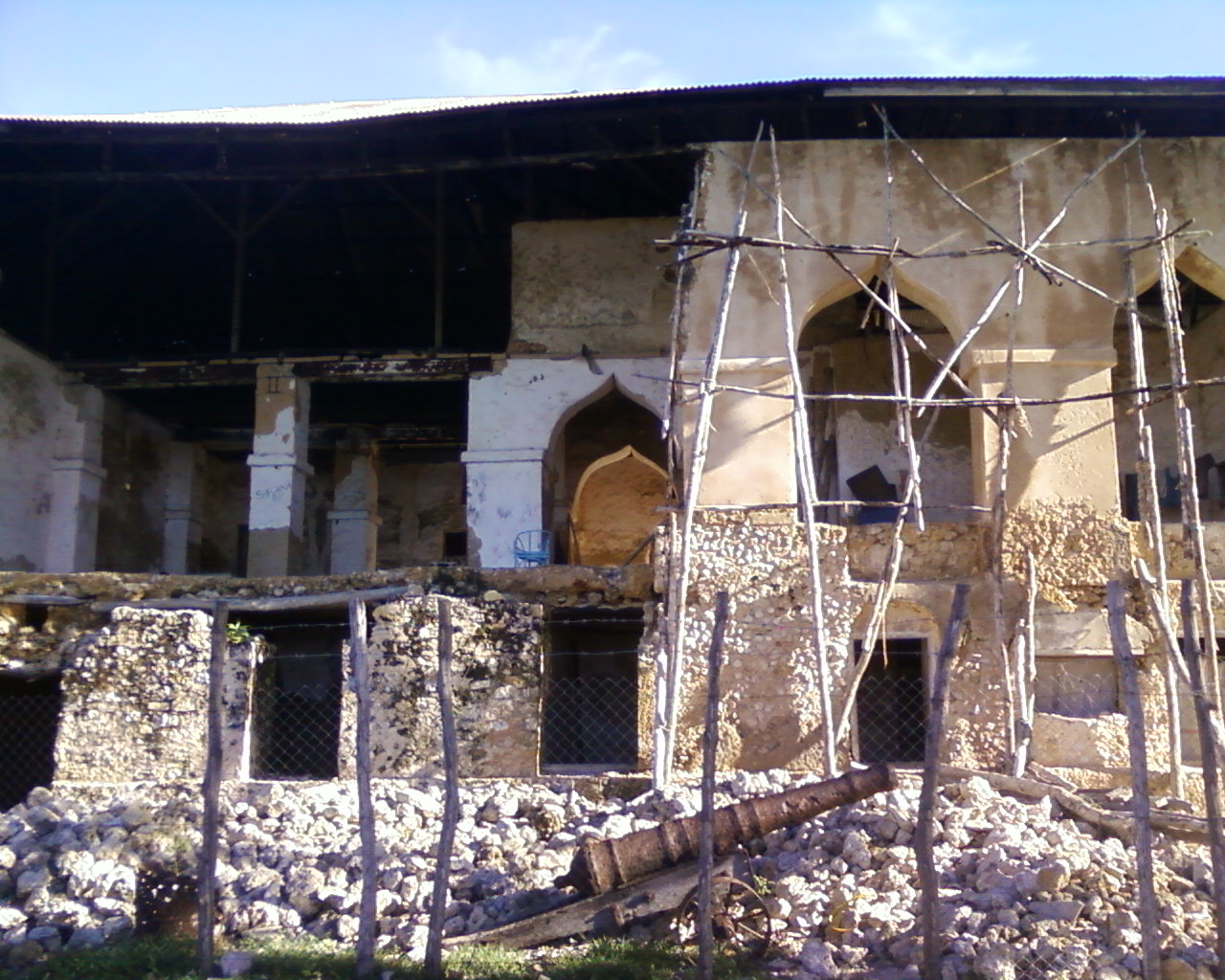
- Old building in Kilwa Kivinje

- Location within Tanzania
- 8°45′21.6″S 39°24′42.12″E
- Type: Cultural
- Location: Mtwara-Mikindani District, Lindi Region, Tanzania

History
- Built: 13th/18th century

Site notes
- Architectural style: Swahili
- Governing body: Antiquities Division, Ministry of Natural Resources and Tourism

National Historic Sites of Tanzania
- Official name: Kilwa Kivinje Historic Site
- Type: Cultural

Kilwa Kivinje Historic Site (Swahili Mji wa Kale wa Kivinje) is a protected historic site located on Kilwa Kivinje ward in Kilwa District in Lindi Region of Tanzania's Indian Ocean coast. The site is home to medieval Swahili ruins and some surviving Swahili buildings from the late 19th century. The settlement of Kilwa Kivinje itself dates back to the 18th–19th centuries, while the periphery settlements of Kisangi Ugoga and Kiwavi flourished during the 13th–16th centuries.

== See also ==
- Historic Swahili Settlements
- National Historic Sites in Tanzania
- Swahili architecture
