= Isimila Stone Age Site =

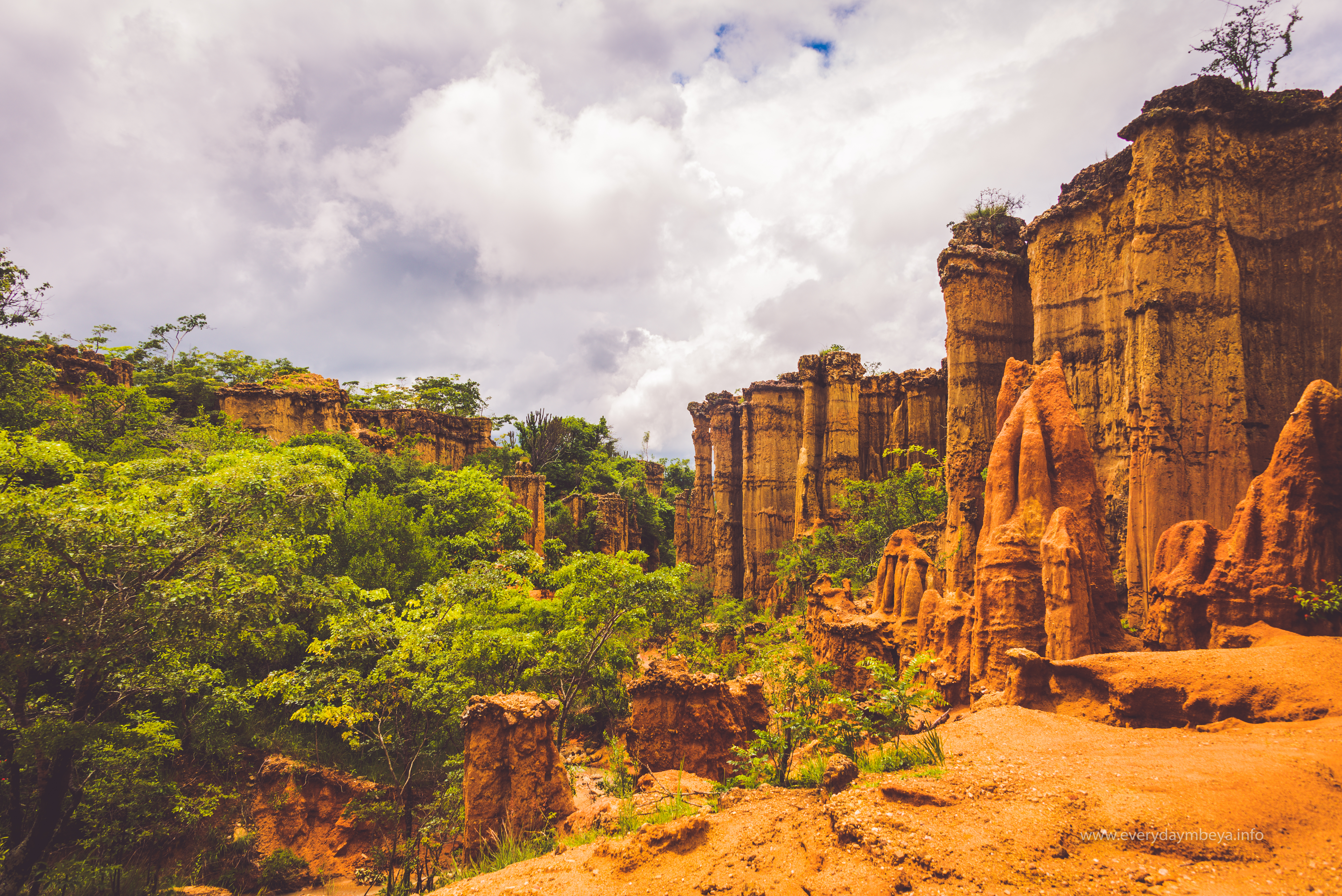
- Landscape of Isimila Site

- Location within Tanzania
- 7°53′49″S 35°36′21″E
- Type: Settlement
- Cultures: Acheulean
- Location: Iringa District, Iringa Region, Tanzania

Site notes
- Material: Stone tools and faunal remains
- Elevation: 1,650 m (5,410 ft)
- Excavation dates: 1954-
- Archaeologists: Clark Howell, Maxine Kleindienst, Glen Cole, Patton Curran, J. Cole, M. Bates
- Condition: Endangered
- Owner: Tanzanian Government

National Historic Sites of Tanzania
- Official name: Isimila Stone Age Site
- Type: prehistoric

Isimila Stone Age Site (Eneo la zama za mawe la Isimila in Swahili) is a prehistoric site located approximately 16 km south of Iringa town (7.90° S, 35.47° E) within the Iringa region in the Southern Highlands of Tanzania. The site harbors a significant manifestation of the Middle Pleistocene archaeological assemblage of Acheulean stone tools, including handaxes, cleavers, picks, scrapers, and cores. The Isimila archaeological site is positioned at ca. 1650 meters above sea level, and it is dated around 500 kya, with the lowest Lukingi member deposited between 500 kya and 900 kya. Its discovery in 1951 was a stroke of luck, as an amateur archaeologist serendipitously observed the first stone artifact and animal bones. The site is known for its dramatic landscape of eroded sandstone pillars and canyons, features recognized by Tanganyika colonial administrators and geographers since the 1920s as caused by rapid soil erosion. Since 1957, Isimila has been gazetted as a reserved area under The Monument Preservation Ordinance of Tanganyika. Isimila was the first site recognized as a national historic site under the Antiquities Act of 1964.

== Discovery and research ==
D.A. McCleman, a South African amateur archaeologist from St Peters School of Johannesburg, made the initial discovery of the Isimila Prehistoric Site on May 2, 1951, while traveling with his friend (Mr Lily) by road from Nairobi to Johannesburg. The initial collection was then donated to the South African Archaeological Survey, including seventeen hand axes, seven cleavers, one small Levallois core, and one backed blade. The collection was described and reported by Prof Van Riet Lowe of the South African Archaeological Survey. He further informed Dr. Louis Leakey about the discovery for future research consideration. Shortly after, the report impressed Prof Clark Howell from Washington University in St. Louis, who set to visit the site in September 1954 with the information provided by Prof Van Riet Lowe [8]. Howell's brief site visit enabled him to establish a rough sketch of the site, stratigraphic illustrations, and collected surface-exposed artifacts, including 90 handaxes, 50 cleavers, and several retouched flakes and cores.

The Isimila prehistoric site became widely known to the scientific community through extensive excavations by the University of Chicago scholars during the 1957-58 field seasons. These excavations revealed a sequence of Pleistocene deposits and a rich collection of Acheulean artifacts, which were subsequently published in various scientific journals and reports. The findings from these excavations were instrumental in highlighting the importance of Isimila as a key site for understanding the technological and cultural developments of early humans in East Africa. The Isimila prehistoric site has been actively excavated until 2017. Its research relevance has persisted until today for its conservation status and sustainability, faunal composition, geology, and stone tools technologies.

== Geology and chronology ==
The Isimila site is predominantly characterized by Precambrian crystalline rock. This rock's nature and distribution are closely associated with the archaeological stratigraphic deposits at Isimila [5]. The rock is a metamorphic type identified as typical bedrock from the Palaeoproterozoic Usagaran domain. The rock is composed of a wide variety that early humans at Isimila used for stone tool making, such as granite, amphibolite, pegmatites, dyke rocks, quartz, and quartzite. The Isimilar geomorphology and geological compositions formed gradually at the beginning of the Pleistocene with the influence of tectonic movements and climatic change. Tectonic activities, including faulting and tilting of landmasses spanning at a local scale, played a significant role in Isimila's formation during the early Pleistocene. These geological transformations corresponded to substantial climatic changes that affected the landscape and vegetation, where the dry and wet climates influenced erosion and sediment deposition manifested in archaeological records. The geologic forces created topographical features and exposed geological formations suitable for early hominins' raw materials procurement for tool making and habitation. The climate influenced the shift in rainfall and increased seasonality, whereas, the tectonic activities and erosions influenced the formation of new soil that transformed dense vegetation into bushland vegetation during the middle Pleistocene. This vegetation became suitable for inhabiting large mammals and hominins at the Isimila site.

The geological sequence at the site measures approximately 18 meters in thickness, exposed along the interconnected Northern and Southern branches of the Isimila stream, which flows westward into the Kipolwi River, a tributary of the Little Ruaha. The site is notable for its extensive silty-clay deposits dominated by fine to medium-grained clastic materials in light brown, gray, pale yellow, and pale olive colors, called the Isimila Formation [9]. The Isimila Formation was initially divided into five stratigraphic units named sand 1-5. Further, the formations were divided into two primary members:

Lisalamagasi Member: This member includes previously classified Sands 1 and 2. The geologic formation features a complex sedimentary structure characterized by the repetitive layering of silt, silty clay, and clay deposits. This geological unity is characterized by the juxtaposition of large cutting tools and natural cobbles that indicate strong periods of erosion during this occupational window. This sequence has been recently dated using optically stimulated luminescence (OSL) methods, enabling precise dating of this stratigraphic sequence and establishing its depositional age from approximately 400 kya to 500 kya. The Lisalamagasi horizon correlates geologically and archaeologically with the Kalambo Falls Prehistoric Site in Zambia. Further, refined dates with faunal correlation have been assigned this layer's deposition to a dating range of approximately 500 kya to 300 kya, indicating its correlation to Olorgasaillie's lower Oltulelei Formations. The chronology of this layer and its correlation to similar archaeological sites in Eastern Africa enriches a corroborative understanding of the cultural and environmental dynamics that shaped human behavior during this period.

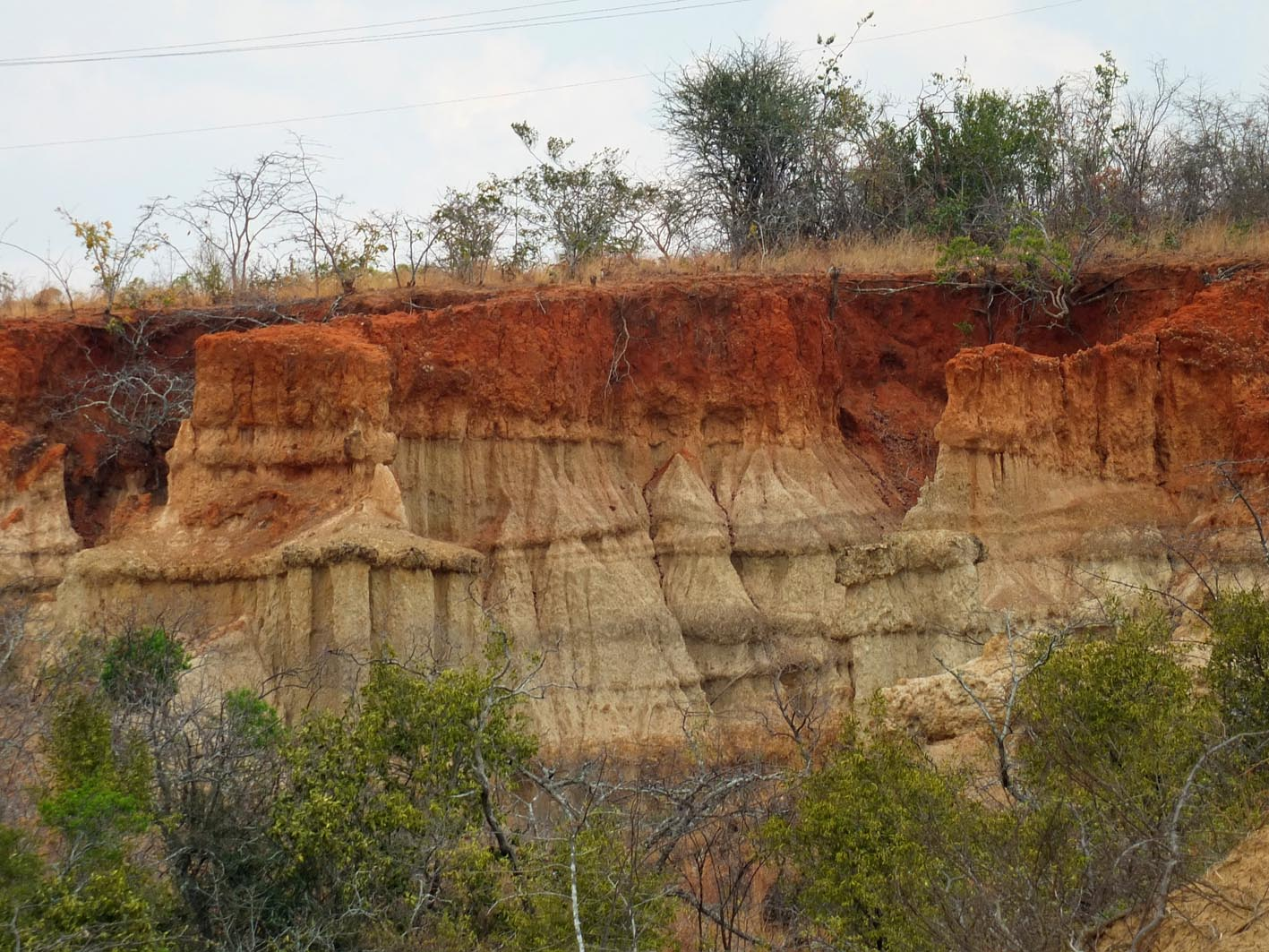
The state of erosion at the Isimila stone age site. The exposed Lukingi member of the Isimila formation is in greyish sediment. Dark grey in the middle indicates the demarcation of the upper (sand 3) and lower (and 4 and 5) of the Lukingi member.

Lukingi Member: This member includes previously referred to as Sand 3, 4, and 5 units. The archaeological remains in this layer exhibit earlier developmental stages of tool-making, differing from the more advanced stages of the Lisalamagasi formation. Diverse sediment types, including sandstone, silty clay, mbuga (a type of wetland), and sand-clay, characterize the Lukingi member. The results of the biostratigraphic comparison indicated that the patterns of faunal extinctions recovered from Isimila Sand 4 are comparable to Oldupai Gorge Bed IV and Olorgesailie successions, which were dated to around 600 kya to 700 kya. The recent dating has been obtained through Electron Spin resonance (ESR) on faunal remains and sediment at Isimila for Sands 3 and 4, indicating the deposition dates for this member ranging between 500 kya and 900 kya, spanning the later Early Pleistocene to the early Middle Pleistocene. The Lukingi horizon chronology correlates with the Olorgesailie formation < 8–10/11 (1.2 mya to 499 kya).

== Stone tools assemblage ==
The Isimila prehistoric site is renowned for its rich collection of Acheulean stone tools. Isimila was considered in determining the compositions of typical Acheulean assemblages in East Africa. The Lisamagalasi formation at Isimila indicates that the upper part of the stratigraphic unity (sand 1) was intensively occupied compared to the lower level (sand 2), which suggests occasional occupations in the temporal span or transitional level. The predominant tool types are large cutting tools, including cleavers, handaxes, and picks. Few knives and a low proportion of core scrapers have been reported from this level. The Acheulean large cutting tools are finely made and well-refined, indicating the improvement of knapping skills from the older Lukingi layers. Handaxe morphologies are predominantly ovate and long-ovate, characterized by advanced edge modifications for trimming, straightness, and symmetry. The raw materials of the stone tools in the Lisamagalasi formation are distinctive according to the tool types, where the large cutting tools are predominantly made from mylonite and granite. In contrast, small-sized flakes are made from quartz and quartzite.

An abundance of various tool types characterizes the Lukingi formation. The upper level of this formation (sand 3) is characterized by abundant cleavers exceeding any other levels at the Isimila formation with various morphologies, including parallel-sided, convergent, and divergent. Other than cleavers, the most common tools in the upper level of this formation comprise handaxes (ovate and triangular), knives, and heavy-duty scrapers. The middle level of this formation (sand 4) is characterized by small and core tools made from quartz with few LCTs, such as cleaves, handaxes, scrapers, picks, choppers, and discoids. The lowermost levels of Lukingi formation (sand 5) have yielded abundant small to medium-sized flakes, cores, choppers, debitage, and sporadic proto-bifaces. The interpretation of this occurrence suggested the pre-paleolake occupations at Isimila.

As in many other East African Acheulean occupations, the Acheulean stone tools assemblage of Isimila was recognized as belonging to three main categories. The first category is the traditional Acheulean, which predominantly consists of > 60% of Large Cutting Tools (LCTs), including cleavers, handaxes, picks, and knives, as seen from the upper level of Lukingi formation to the upper of Isimila formation. The second category consists of seemingly equivalent proportions of the LCTs and the small flaked tools and cores, whereas at Isimila, small tools predominate (40% to 60%) of the assemblage in the middle of Lukingi formation. The third category comprises the assemblage minus the LCTs and is mainly represented by small flakes, as evident in the lowermost level of Lukingi formation. These variations are widely recognized in many Acheulean assemblages worldwide. The variation of Acheulean tools and raw materials types potentially signifies different ecological adjustments related to resource procurement regarding subsistence and technology.

== Faunal remains and paleoenvironment ==
The Isimila Prehistoric Site has yielded various faunal remains that provide valuable insights into the environment and ecosystem during the middle Pleistocene occupation. Due to the acidic nature of sediments in the Lisamagalasi formation and upper Lukingi level, most faunal remains were recovered in the middle Luking level (sand 4). Some of the notable faunal remains found at Isimila include the species of prehistoric Elephants (Elephas recki), Rhinos (Diceros bicornis), Zebra (Equus cf. burchelli), Bovids (Cephalophini, Bovini, Antilopini, and Parmularius angusticornis), and Leporidae. Other extinct animals from Isimila include Pigs (phacochoerine Afrochoerus). An extinct species of hippopotamus (Hippopotamus gorgops) was reported by Howell et al., the only faunal recovered at the upper levels of Isimila formation. This species had longer legs and a more pronounced snout than the modern hippotamus. Given the scarcity of faunal remains and poor preservation status, it has been presumed that this animal was killed in shallow water, probably a swamp, and was quickly buried. However, later analysis questioned the presence of such species due to the indistinguishable features on their teeth from the extant species Hippopotamus amphibius. The faunal composition indicates the presence of water bodies and a diverse range of habitats that support large herbivores during the middle Lukingi level. The faunal extinction and sediment deposition, especially the 'mbuga,' suggest similar paleoenvironmental conditions to Oldupai Gorge Bed IV, dominated by silt sand, clay, and sandstone sediments. Mbuga sediments have been defined from contemporary central to southwestern Tanzania as grass-covered flood plains predominated with clayey sediments, often in black color. Pollen data has yet to be recovered at Isimila, and this has been interpreted as suggesting dry climatic conditions during the sedimentation of Isimila beds. Paleoenvironmental data has shown that woody shrubs and grasses dominated the prehistoric Isimila landscape. The association of faunal remains with Acheulean tools provides context for the technological advancements of early humans. It shows how they effectively adapted their tool-making techniques through time, probably with increased efficiency in resource extractions, especially large games.

== Conservation and local community ==
The Isimila Prehistoric Site is recognized as a significant archaeological and cultural heritage site. It holds potential for scientific and economic value for researchers and local communities. Ismila has been open to the public as a national historic site to promote regional tourism activities. However, there are challenges in conservation efforts. The site has faced rapid erosion of the paleolake and degradation due to natural factors and human activities, especially agriculture. A proper way to protect and preserve the Isimila prehistoric site was to provide community awareness and engagement in preservation efforts. However, the conservation and preservation legislations confront local communities to engage in preserving heritage resources in their landscapes. Efforts are being made to involve local communities in the conservation and sustainable development of the site to ensure its preservation for future generations. The suggestions for sustainable management and tourism development at the Isimila site include prehistoric ecological variables incorporating raw materials surveys and hunting and camping sites around the site. Currently, the local community does not play an essential role in conserving the Isimila site, which substantiates the danger of the management and development of the site. The research indicates that there is likely growing awareness and understanding of sustainable heritage management within the local community in the near future as engagement and involvement efforts continue to unfold. In a recent reflection on more than a decade of archaeological work in the region, Miller et al. anticipate promoting awareness among the Isimila primary stakeholders and supporting local initiatives for archaeological heritage conservation. In addition, they intend to improve the representation of the Isimila prehistoric site by updating museum displays and supporting local heritage practitioners with resources to strengthen community awareness and engagement at Isimila.
