= Mkia wa Ng'ombe =

National Historic Site of Tanzania

Mkia wa Ng'ombe Ruins
- Location within Tanzania
- 4°57′6.84″S 39°41′16.08″E
- Type: Settlement
- Cultures: Swahili
- Location: Micheweni District, Pemba North Region, Tanzania

History
- Built: 12th century CE
- Abandoned: 15th century CE

Site notes
- Material: Coral rag
- Architectural styles: Swahili & Islamic
- Condition: Endangered
- Owner: Tanzanian Government
- Management: Antiquities Division, Ministry of Natural Resources and Tourism

National Historic Sites of Tanzania
- Official name: Mkia wa Ng'ombe Ruins Historic Site
- Type: Cultural

Mkia wa Ng'ombe Ruins (Magofu ya mji wa Kale wa Mkia wa Ng'ombe in Swahili ) is a protected historic site located inside Micheweni District of Pemba North Region in Tanzania. The settlement was established around the 15th CE and abandoned in the 16th century. There are ruins of a mosque, tombs and some stone buildings. The site is critically endangered to further erosion.

== See also ==
- Historic Swahili Settlements
- Archaeology of Pemba Island
