= Livingstone's Tembe =

National Historic Site of Tanzania

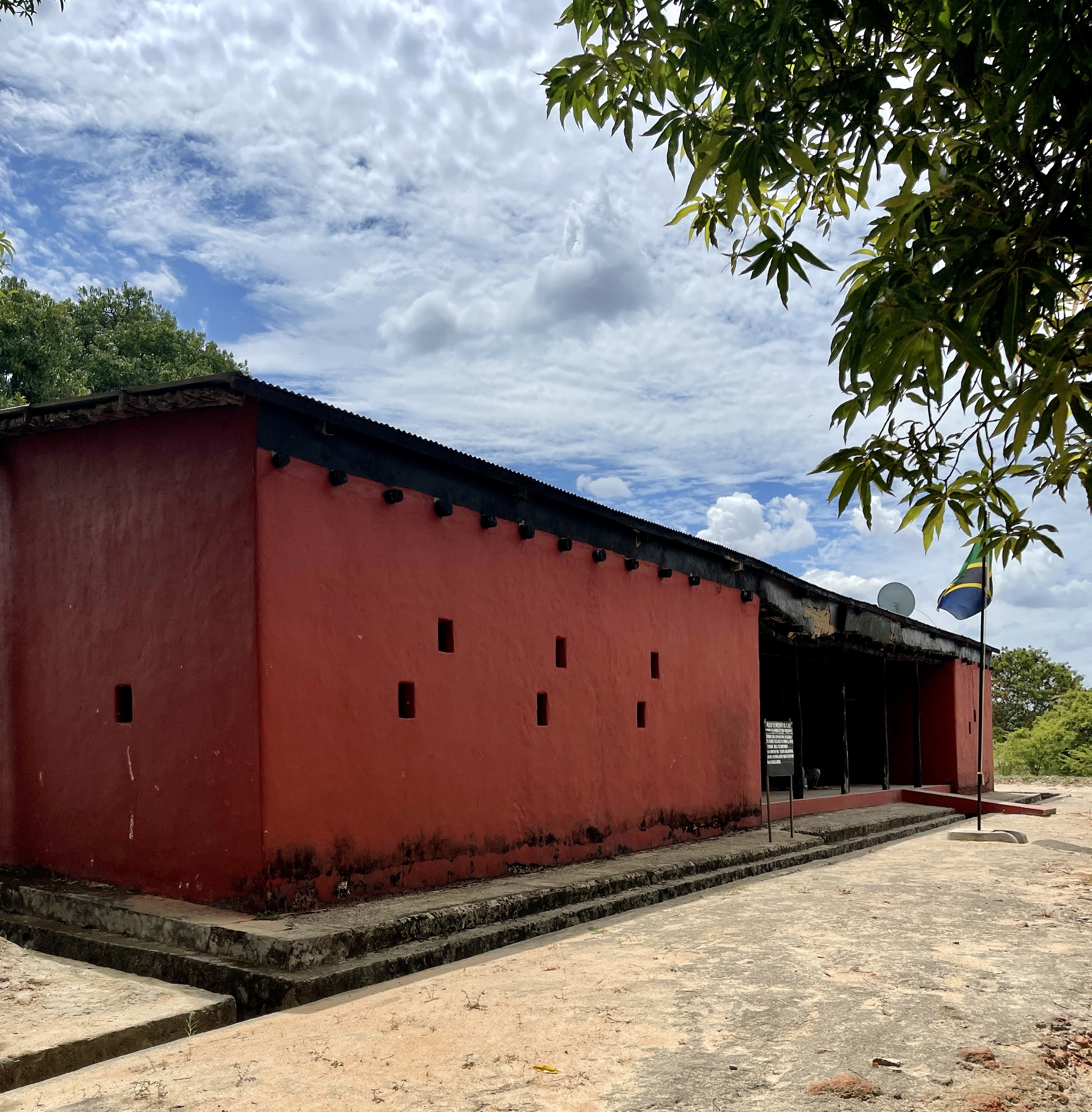
- Livingstone's Tembe Museum, Tabora District

- Location within Tanzania
- 5°5′43″S 32°47′39″E
- Type: Settlement
- Location: Tabora Urban District, Tabora Region, Tanzania

History
- Built: 1857
- Abandoned: 20th Century

Site notes
- Material: Stone and mud
- Architectural style: Swahili
- Condition: Good
- Owner: Tanzanian Government
- Management: Antiquities Division, Ministry of Natural Resources and Tourism

National Historic Sites of Tanzania
- Official name: Livingstone's Tembe Historic Site
- Type: Cultural

Livingstone's Tembe or David Livingstone Museum, Tabora (Tembe la Livingstone in Swahili) is a national historic site next to the village of Kwihara located in Tabora Urban District of Tabora Region. The home was constructed in 1857. David Livingstone lived there for a portion of 1871. The explorer Henry Morton Stanley stayed there for three months later that year in the hopes that the Arabs would vanquish Mirambo, the illustrious ruler of the Nyamwezi (People of the Moon) tribe, and reopen the route to Lake Tanganyika. After Mirambo won, Stanley had to use Mpanda to get to Ujiji. The following year, Stanley and Livingstone came back to the Tembe, jointly. It is currently a museum and has some authentically carved Swahili doors, a few letters sent by David Livingstone, and details about the slave trade.

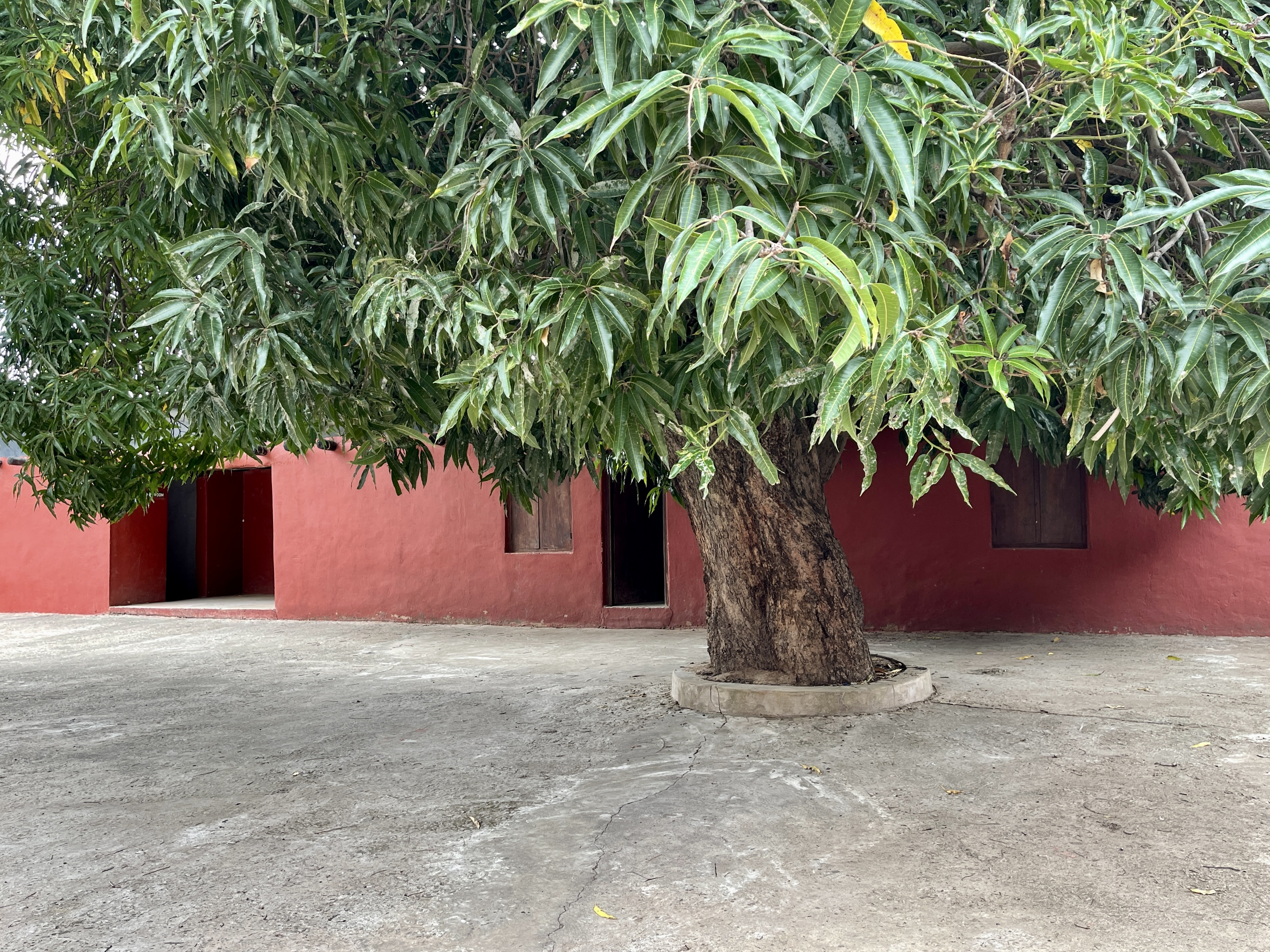
200 year old Mango tree at Livingstone's Tembe
