= Kalambo Falls Prehistoric Site =

Prehistoric settlement in Songwe Region

Kalambo Prehistoric Site
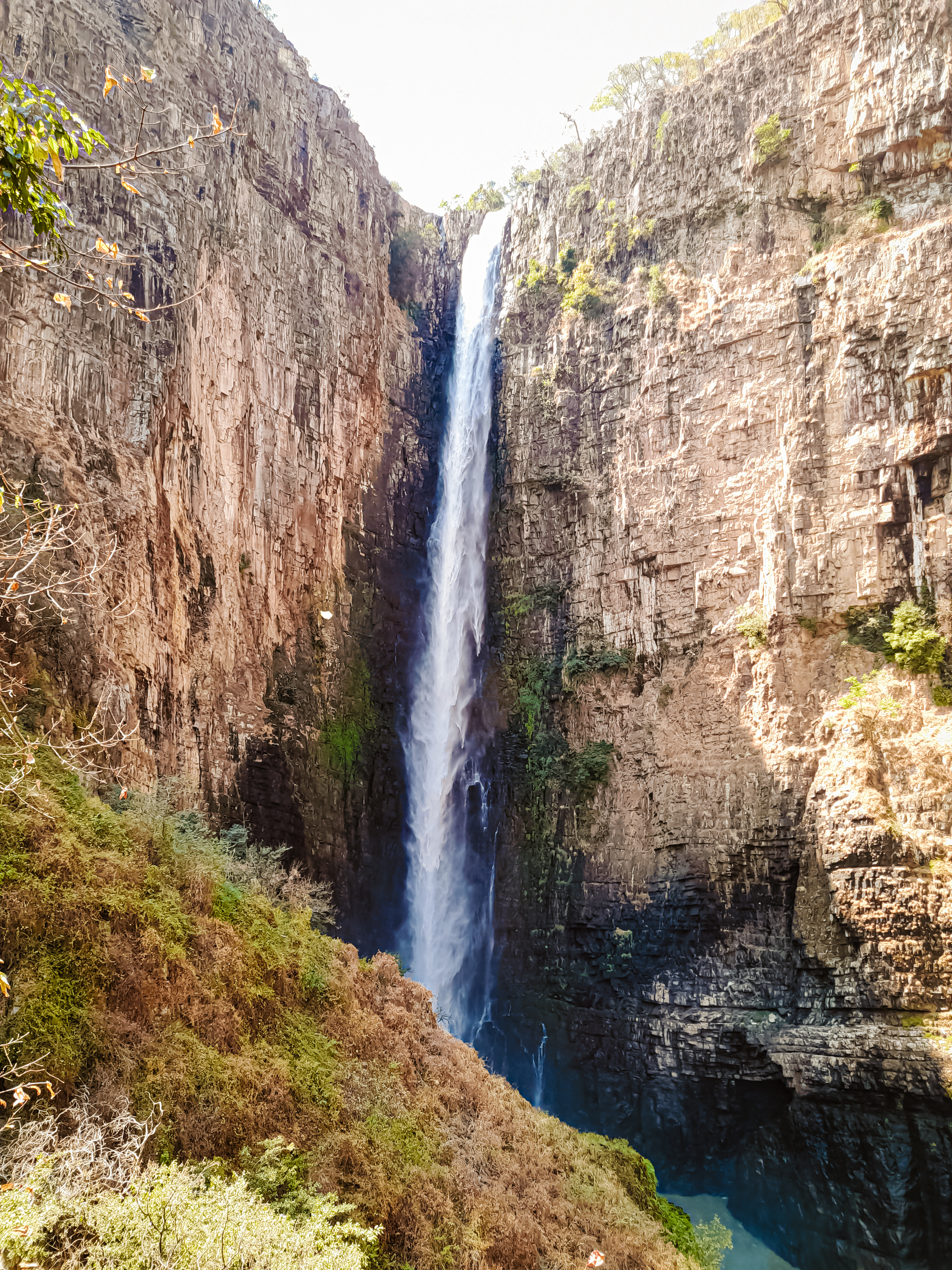
- Kalambo Falls in Rukwa Region

- Location within Tanzania
- 8°35′0″S 31°14′0″E
- Type: Prehistoric Settlement
- Location: Kalambo District, Rukwa Region, Tanzania

Site notes
- Archaeologists: John Desmond Clark
- Condition: Endangered
- Owner: Tanzanian Government
- Management: Antiquities Division, Ministry of Natural Resources and Tourism

National Historic Sites of Tanzania
- Official name: Kalambo Falls Prehistoric Site
- Type: Cultural

The Kalambo Falls Prehistoric Sites (Eneo la kale la maporomoko ya Kalambo in Swahili) is an archaeological site in Kapele ward in Kalambo District inside Rukwa Region of Tanzania. Professor John Desmond Clark explored the site from 1956 to 1959. Excavations in the lakebeds uncovered a stone age sequence from the early stone age to the iron age, with the majority of it stratified in residential floors.
