= List of Swahili settlements of the East African coast =

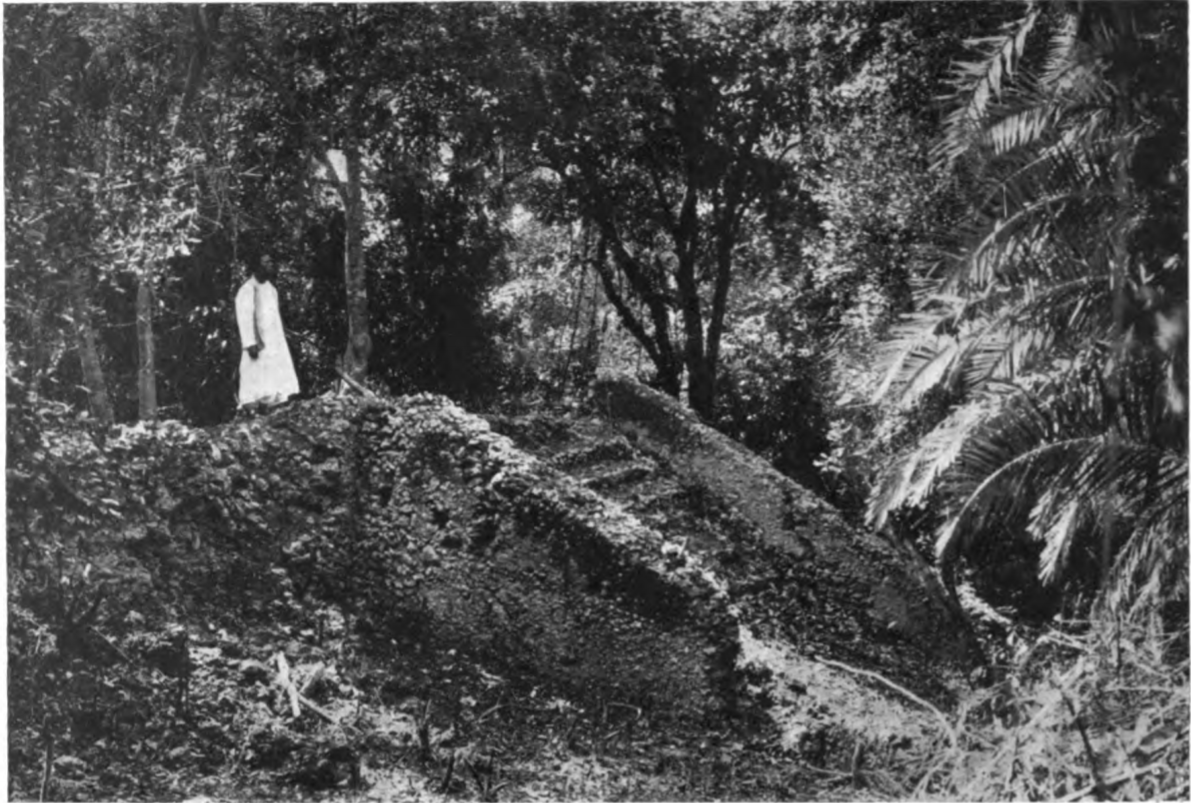
Pujini Ruins in Chake Chake District, Tanzania.

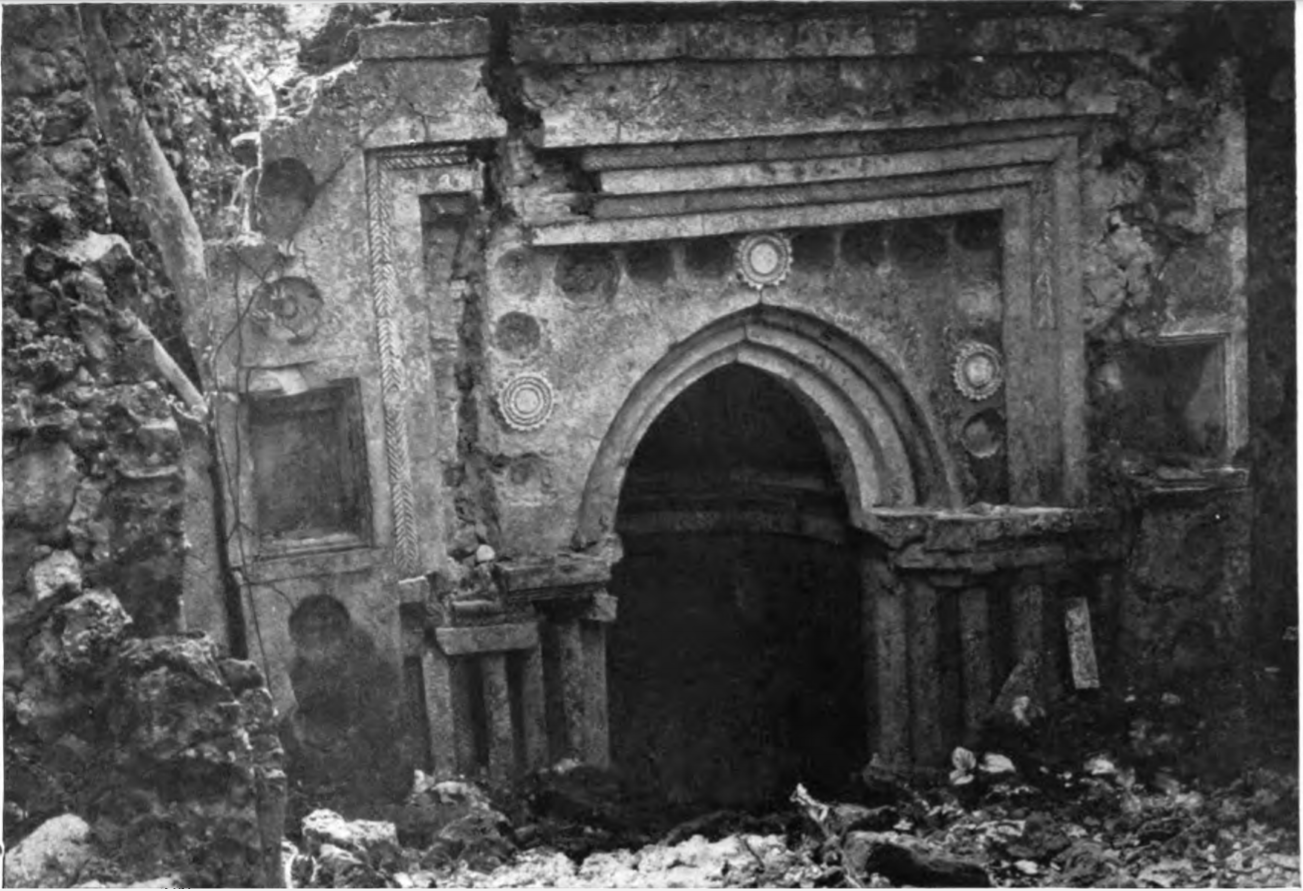
Chwaka Mosque in Micheweni District, Tanzania.

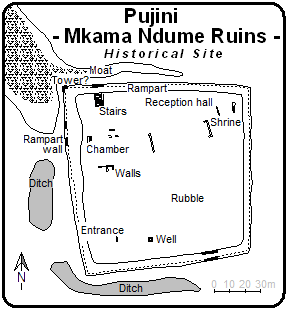
Mkama Ndume palace in Pujini, Chake Chake District, Tanzania.

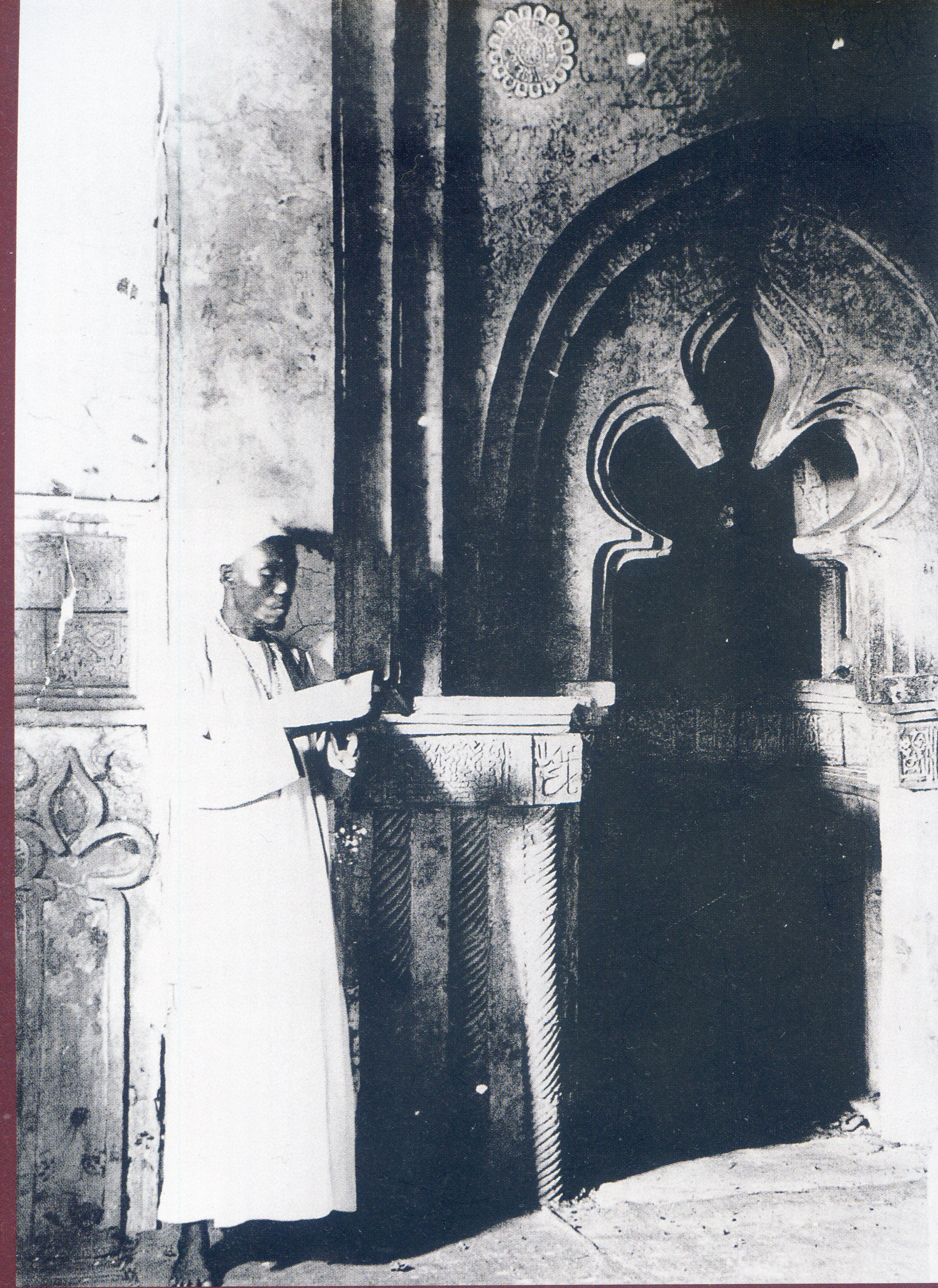
Kizimkazi Mosque in Dimbani, Kusini District, Tanzania.

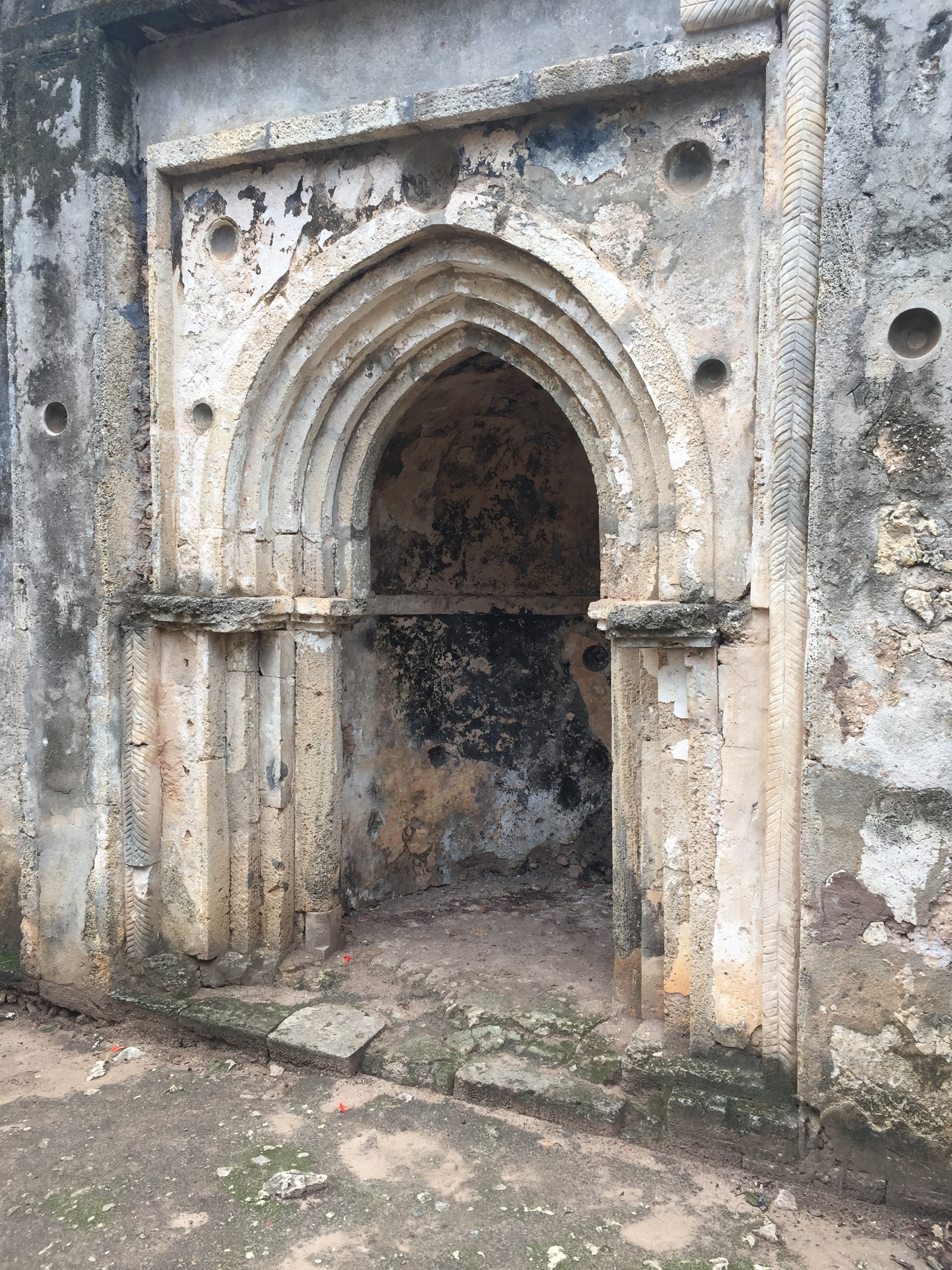
Gedi in Kenya.

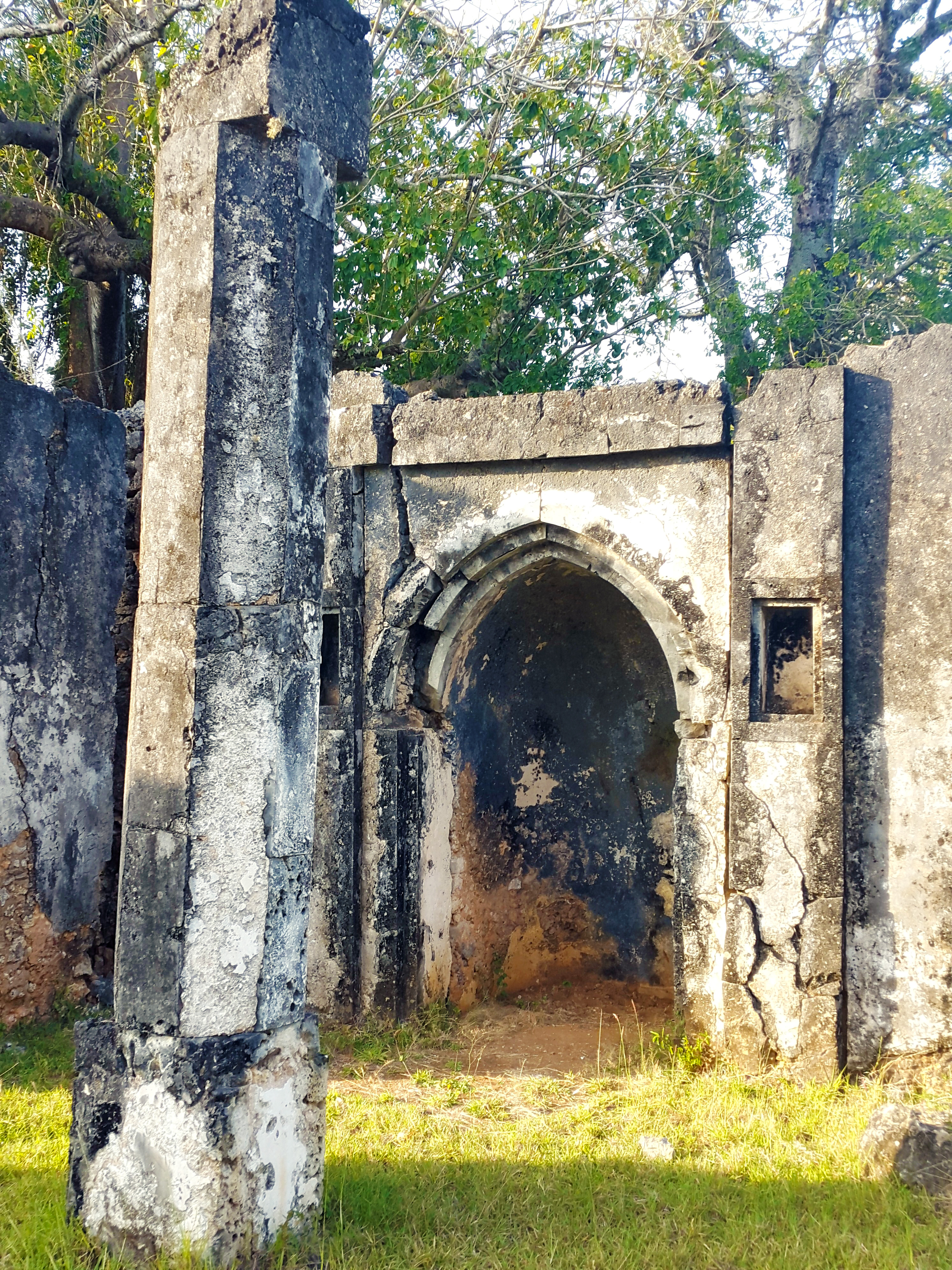
Tongoni Ruins in Tanga District, Tanzania.

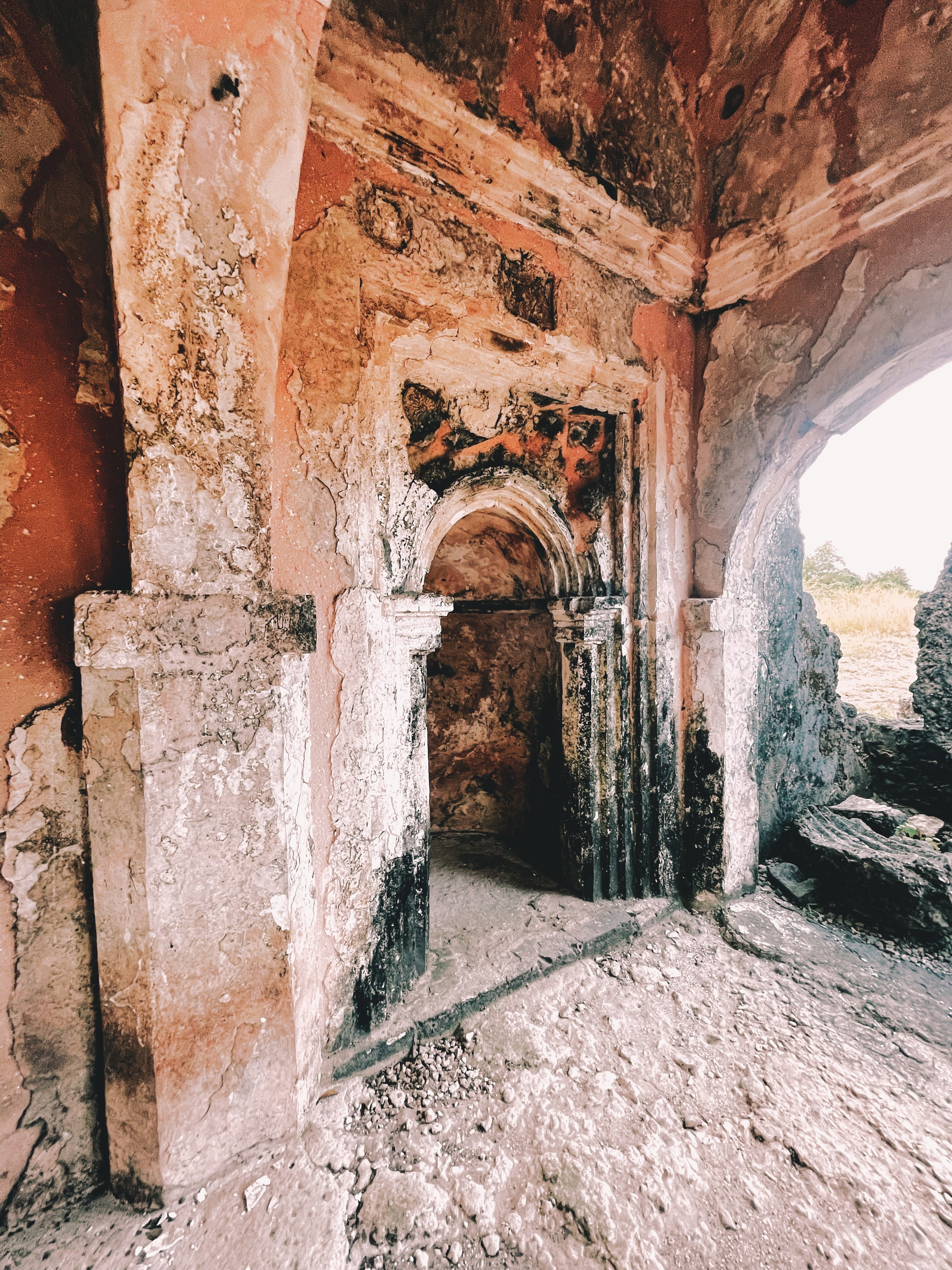
Kilwa Kisiwani ruins in Kilwa District, Tanzania.

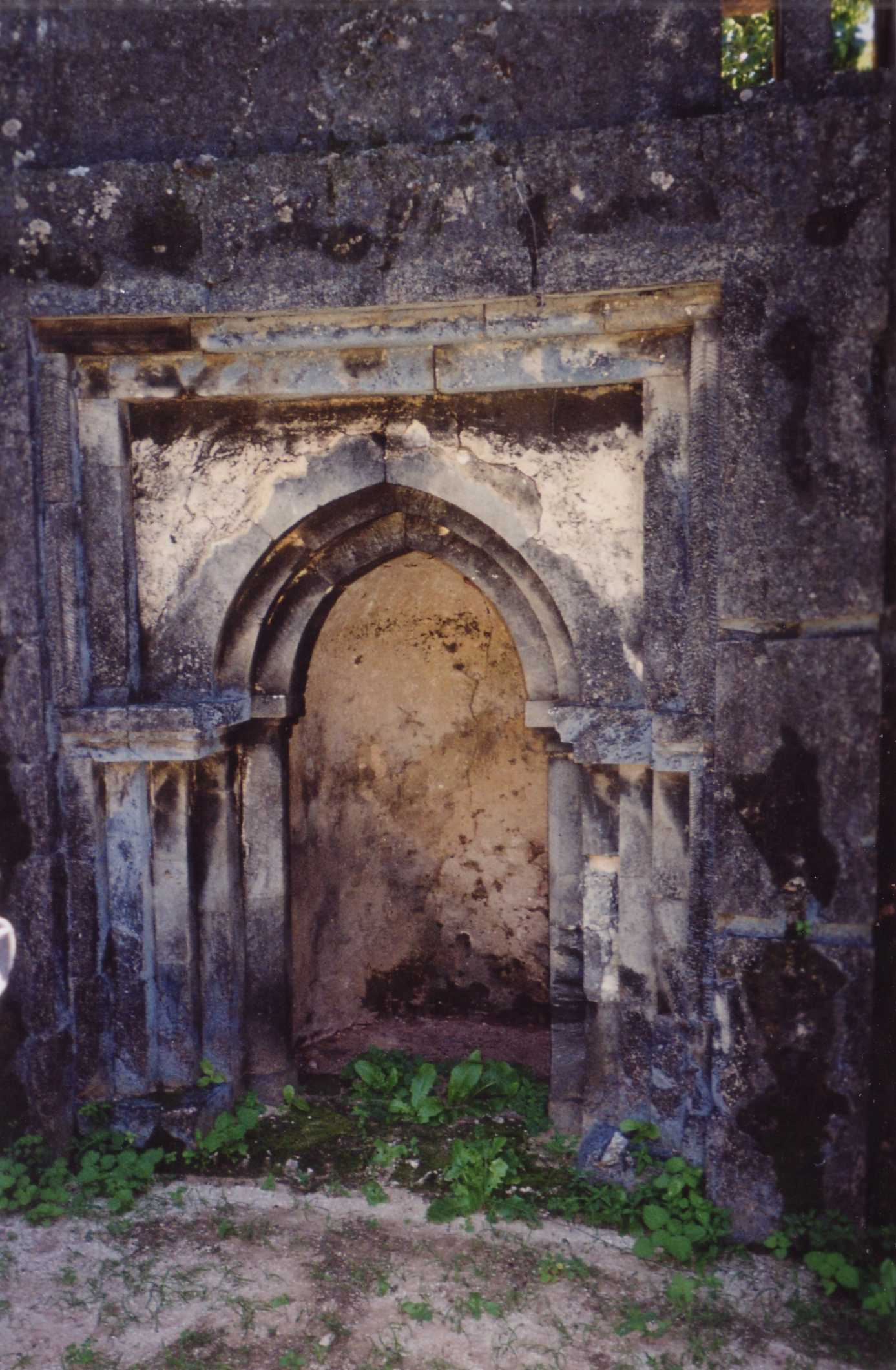
Takwa ruins in Manda Island, Kenya.

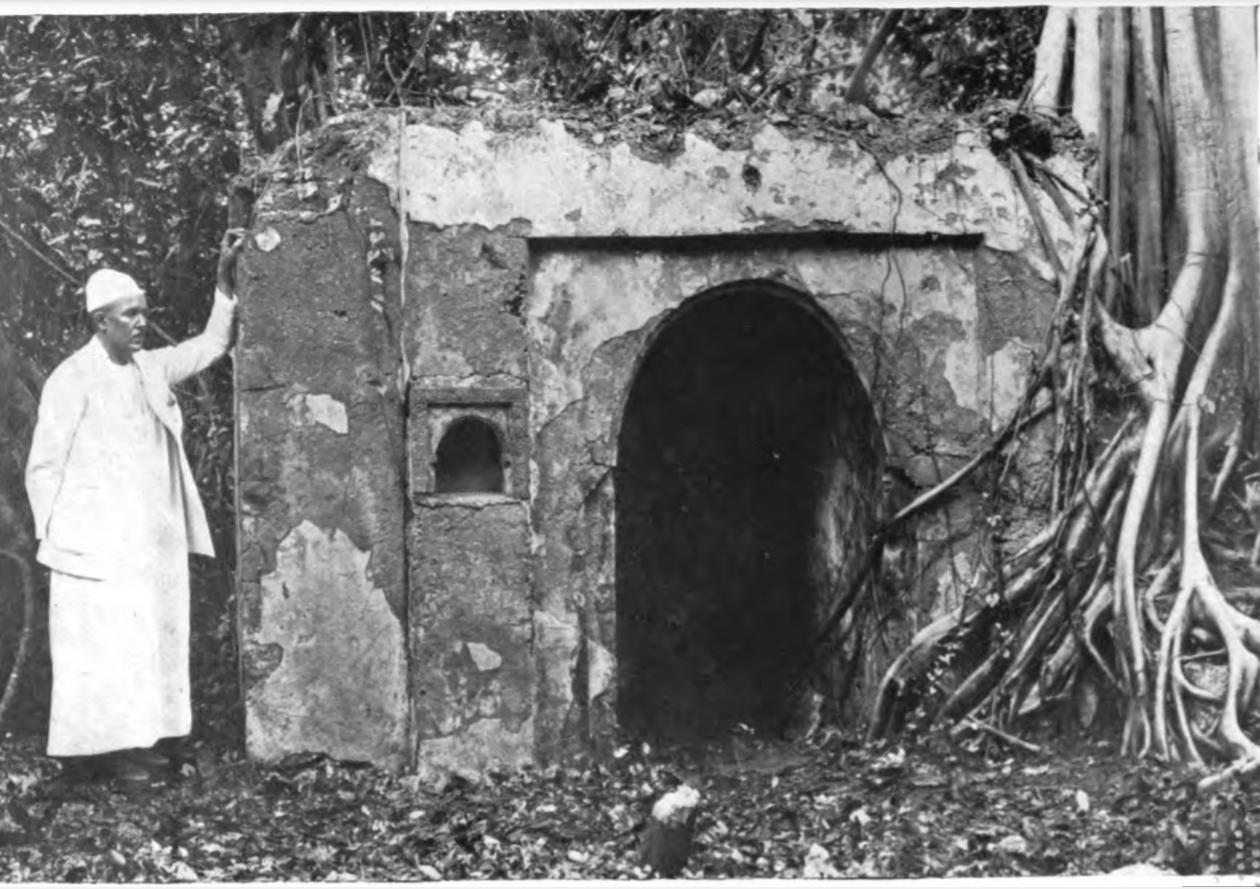
Msuka Mjini Ruins Mosque in Micheweni District, Tanzania.

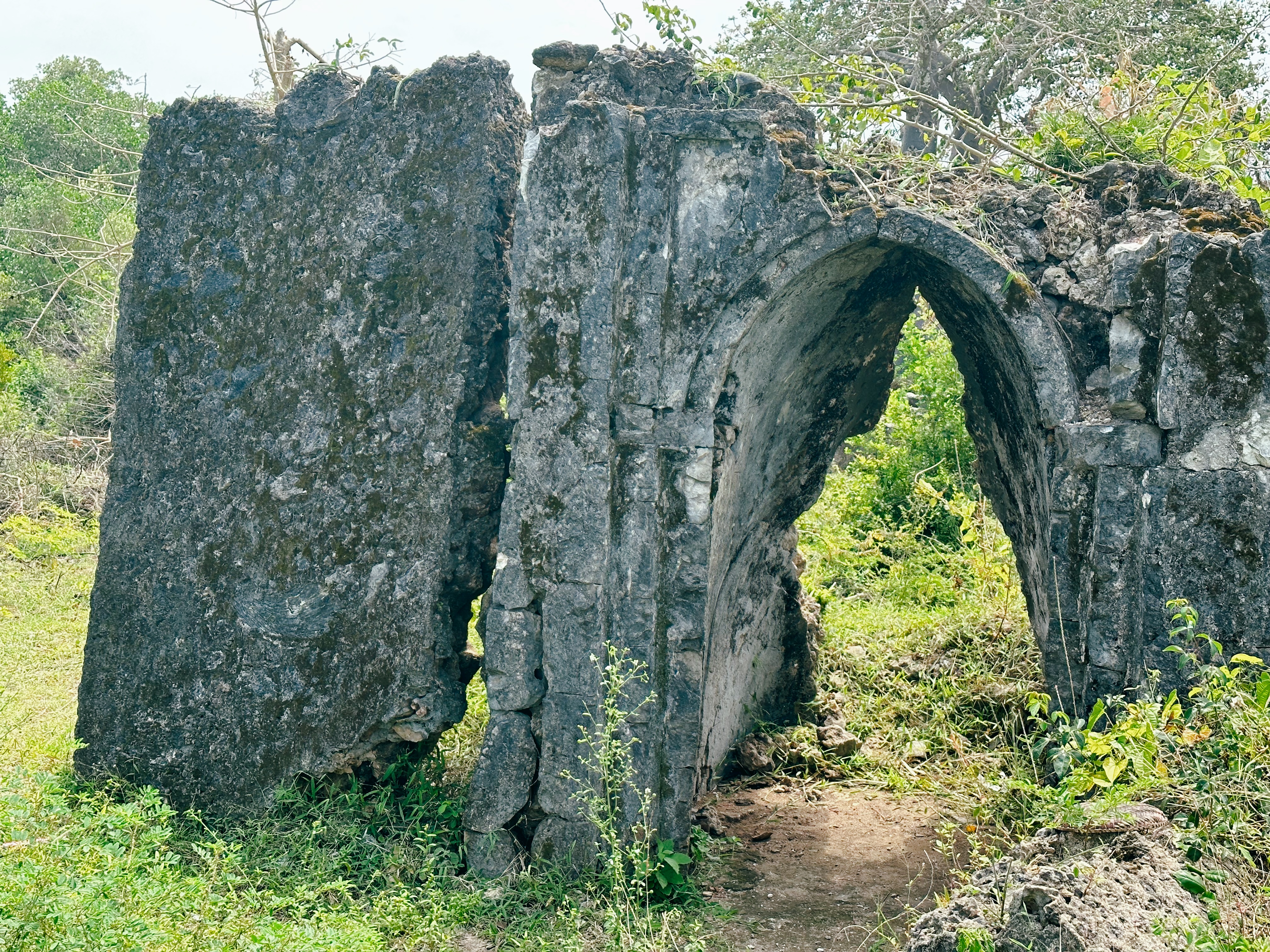
Mbutu Bandarini Mosque in Kigamboni District, Tanzania.

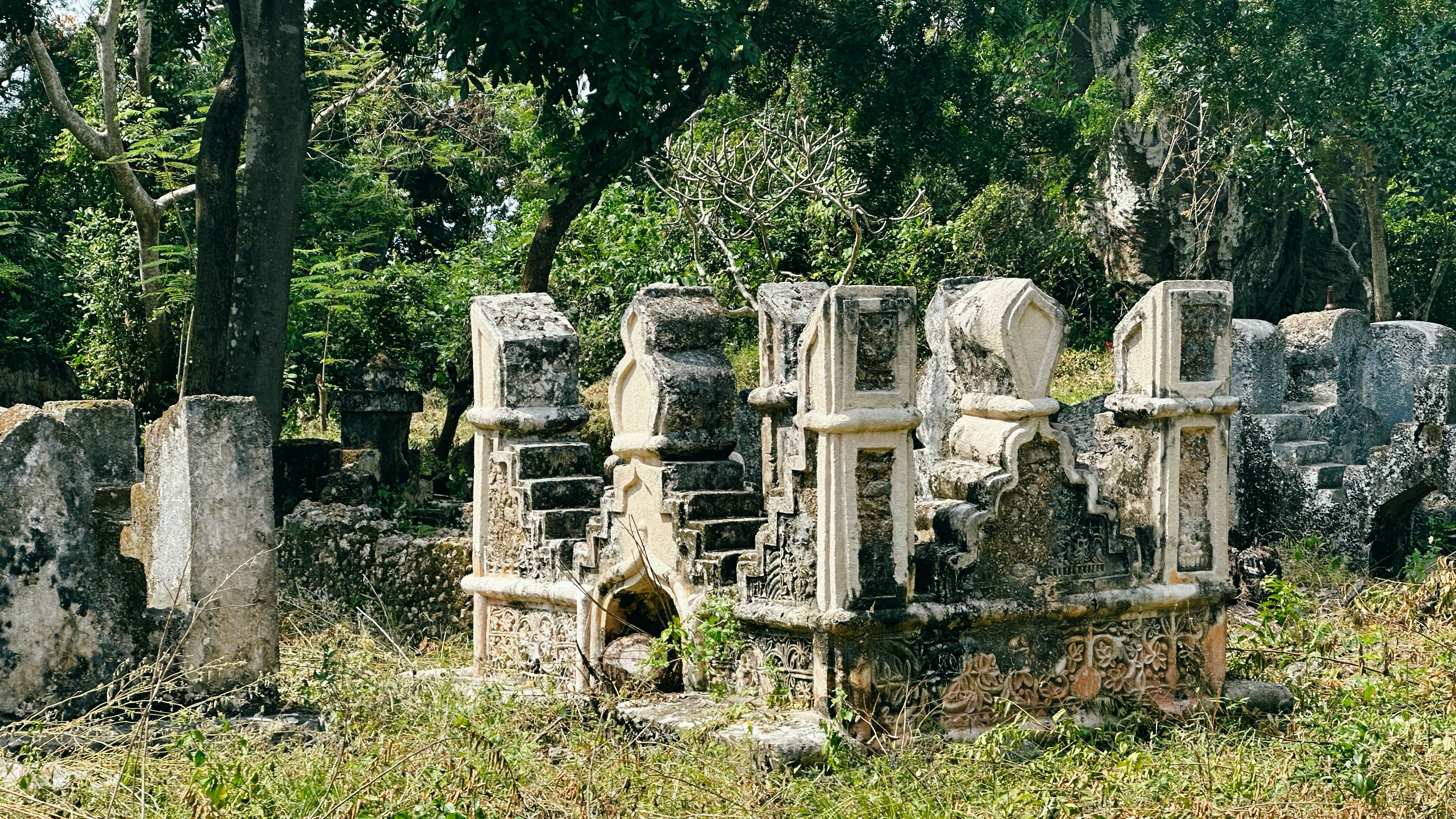
Mbuamaji tombs in Kigamboni District, Tanzania.

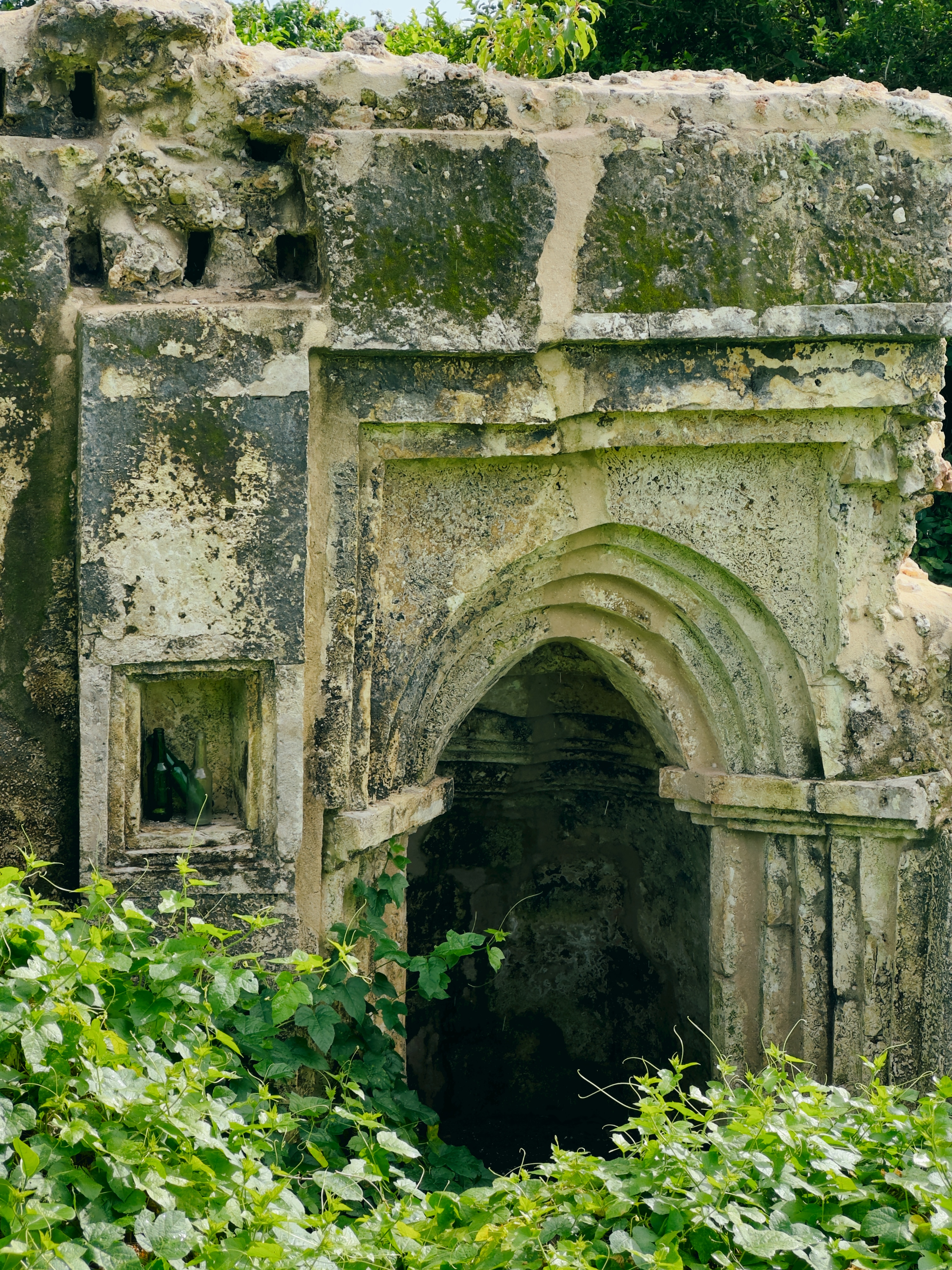
Kimbiji Mosque in Kigamboni District, Tanzania.

Swahili settlements of the East African coast date from as early as the first century CE when eastern Bantu people on the east coast of Africa began adopting the Swahili language and culture and founded settlements along the coast and islands. Below is a list of Swahili settlements founded between 800 CE to 1900 CE.

== Northern coast, Tanzania ==
- Manza
- Tanga Island
- Tanga
- Yambe Island
- Tongoni
- Mnarani
- Muhembo
- Bweni Kuu
- Ras Kikokwe
- Kipumbwe
- Kiungani
- Sange
- Kisikimto
- Ushongo
- Mkwaja
- Bimbini
- Mafui
- Uzimia
- Buyuni
- Saadani
- Utondwe
- Winde
- Mkadini
- Bagamoyo Historic Town
- Kaole

== Southern Coast, Tanzania ==
- Mbegani
- Old Mbweni
- Ukutani
- Kunduchi
- Old Msasani
- Old Mjimwema
- Mbuamaji
- Kimbiji
- Kigunda
- Funza
- Jino Baya
- Sala
- Kutani
- Kisiju
- Kwale Island, Pwani
- Koma Island
- Kisimani, Mafia
- Kua Juani
- Mwanamkuru
- Mbutu Bandarini
- Ras Dege
- Kanyegwa Mfunguni
- Ras Kutani
- Jambe Juani
- Chole
- Jibondo
- Kivinje
- Mtitimira
- Kilwa Kisiwani
- Songo Mnara
- Mivinja
- Mkuje
- Kikurwi
- Pemba Mnazi
- Buyuni Mbuyuni
- Mwanakiwambi
- Sanje Majoma
- Sanje ya Kati
- Majumbe
- Kisawere
- Lindi
- Mchinga
- Ngao Mwanya
- Mikindani
- Msemo
- Kiruti Island
- Boza Island
- Ngevu
- Mkungu

== Zanzibar Island, Tanzania ==
- Zanzibar Town
- Unguja Ukuu
- Kizimkazi
- Mbweni, Zanzibar
- Dunga
- Mkokotoni
- Shangani
- Pwani Deburi
- Beit El Ras
- Chuini
- Kidichi
- Kizimbani
- Pwani ya Deburi
- Chukwani
- Maharubi
- Mbweni
- Tumbatu
- Makunduchi
- Mvuleni
- Chwaka
- Nungwi
- Fukuchani
- Jongowe
- Shungi
- Uroa
- Old Mvuleni

== Pemba Island, Tanzania ==
- Shengeju
- Ndagoni
- Chake (fort)
- Pujini Ruins
- Chwaka Harun site
- Mandani
- Kichokochwe Ruins
- Verani
- Mkia wa Ng'ombe
- Kimeliani
- Mduuni
- Shumba
- Msuka Mjini Ruins
- Makongwe
- Kiwani
- Jambangome
- Bandari ya Faraji
- Mtambwe Kuu
- Msuka
- Shamiani
- Chambani
- Kiungoni
- Mtangani
- Mkama Ndume
- Tumbe
- Finga
- Kojani
- Wingwi
- Kiungoni
- Kiuyu
- Vitongoje
- Mitondoni
- Ras Mkumbuu Ruins
- Mtangani
- Mduuni
- Finga

== South coast, Kenya ==
- Ngomeni
- Mambrui
- Malindi
- Mgangani
- Gedi
- Watamu
- Kilepwa
- Kilifi
- Mnarani, Kenya
- Kitoka
- Takaungu
- Kinuni
- Jumba la Mtwana
- Mtwapa
- Kongowea, Mombasa
- Mvita, Mombasa
- Kilindini, Mombasa
- Tiwi
- Diani
- Ukunda
- Gazi
- Munge
- Kifundi
- Wassini
- Vanga
- Vumba Kuu

== North coast, Kenya ==
- Ishakani
- Kiunga
- Mwana Mtama
- Omwe
- Mambore
- Uchi Juu
- Shee Umuro
- Shee Jafari
- Rubu
- Simambaya
- Sendeni
- Mvindeni
- Kiwayu
- Ndau
- Faza
- Kizingitini
- Tundwa
- Atu
- Siyu
- Kitau
- Shanga
- Wange
- Dondo
- Bui
- Pate
- Magogoni
- Kipungani
- Manda
- Takwa
- Shela
- Lamu
- Matondoni
- Mkunumbi
- Uziwa
- Witu
- Mea
- Al Famau
- Bunta la Mwana
- Shaka
- Ungwana
- Kipini
- Kau
- Manda
