= Pottery of Manda Island =

The basic chronology of the early town of Manda Island in the Lamu Archipelago of Kenya is divided into 6 different periods, based mostly on the types of imported pottery that has been found in different strata of the excavations. The first period, I, begins in the mid ninth century and is subdivided into four parts, a, b, c, and d, ending in the early eleventh century. Period II has two parts, A and B, though the divide between the two is rather vague and could be entirely arbitrary, and dates from the mid eleventh to the late twelfth for the former, and late twelfth to late thirteenth century for the latter. Period III runs from the late thirteenth century to the fourteenth when Period IV picks up and ends in the early Sixteenth. Period V covers the mid Sixteenth and all of the seventeenth, and the final period covers everything after the Seventeenth century.

== Imported wares ==
=== Imported Chinese stone and porcelain wares ===
These vessels are interesting because there are no other pieces of contemporary Chinese wares found in east Africa. There were five types of Chinese wares in period I:

Dosun ware
This is stoneware that typically has an olive green glaze that is usually over grey body. At Manda there are jars with a number of embryonic handles at the shoulder of body. No complete specimens have been found at Manda but this type of pottery is known from other sites to have been ovoid in shape. This type is found in the pre-mosque strata so they are appearing in Manda as early as 800 AD.
Painted ware
These are thickly potted bowls usually decorated with free hand abstract or floral motifs. They are usually green or green and brown in colour under a yellow or greenish olive glaze. There is little known about this style from China as not many specimens have been found. This type is also found in pre-mosque strata onward like Dosun.
Green-grey wares
This type is also referred to as Yue type and is believed to be ancestral to celadon type pottery. It typically comes in a matte glaze which is usually grey green on a grey base and is sometimes decorated with marks around the inside and outside of the base. This style usually takes the form of bowls in Manda. They appear after the reconstruction of the mosque which occurred after 850.
White porcelain
These are typically thinly potted bowls decorated with white fabric and a non-translucent white glaze. This style is also referred to, perhaps misleadingly, as porcelaneous stoneware. The rim of these vessels often has slight decorative nicks. This style probably has a South China origin rather than a North China one and are found in strata dated to between 850 and 950, continuing to be found in strata into Period IIA.
White stoneware
This style is characterized by a cream-coloured paste with a white glaze and is more thickly potted than the porcelain. It typically takes the form of a bowl with a very wide flat base ring. It is found in earlier strata than the porcelain, dating it to just after the mosque period. One fragment of a lid has been found at Manda.
Porcelain and stoneware
These continue to be found at Manda but are very rare after Period IIB.

== Islamic wares ==
=== Glazed wares of Period I ===
Sasanian Islamic
Sasanian Islamic is the most common style found in this period and finds of this style mainly consist of large vessels which are typically blue-green in colour but can be green-blue. Many have become a light blue mostly with matting due to age and weathering. There is an inner glaze found in vessels other than the bowls which is usually different from the outer glaze which usually comes in either white, blue, or black, colours which are likely due to firing conditions; if the firing is done incorrectly a purple red shade can be a result.
Jars are the largest category of Sasanian wares and are large heavily potted vessels which exhibit both applied and incised decoration usually in a Wavy line motif. The applied decorations, on the other hand, are molded and are restricted to rosettes. These vessels have ring bases and curved handles.
Sasanian wares also come as basins with straight flaring sides and a flat base as well as an out-turned rim. They are found in strata from early inhabitance to the beginning of Period IIA.
White or Tin Glazed ware
The specimens at Manda have weathered glazes that were previously dead white but have aged into more of a grey color. This type of pottery has an arguable origin; it is believed that this type of pottery was used to imitate the white Chinese porcelain and/or stoneware.
Bowls
Bowls of Islamic make are similar in shape to Chinese bowls of this period and the base is often recessed. The glaze is usually blue but there are examples of green and one example had blue inscriptions. These vessels are found after Period IA.
Lustre ware
This style is rather rare compared to most other imported wares of the first period and comes in 2 groups. The first is a white opaque glaze with a buff body which is more common and is a variation of the white glazed wares while the second has a dark blue glaze with a white body. Both types are almost always nearly hemispherical bowls.
Green and White ware
This is also very rare in comparison to other types found at Manda. It has a relatively hard, off white or buffed body with a white slip and both the interior and exterior are glazed. This glaze is usually striped. It is likely that all wares of this type were bowls but due to the fact that the sample size is so small it is impossible to know for certain.

=== Glazed Islamic wares of Period II ===
Sgraffiato
This style comprises the vast majority of Period II imports. Specimens are mostly bowls but some jars have been found as well. This style was imported until the end of the thirteenth century. In the 11-12th century there are three types of Sgraffiato, characterized by the type of decoration present on the vessels. Hatched Sgraffiato is mostly floral designs with the background around the designs often composed of incised lines, Simple Sgraffiato is decorated in plain incised curvilinear lines, and finally, Champlevé Sgraffiato has parts of the slip removed so as to expose the red body of the vessels. 13th century Sgraffiato wares are typically of a far poorer quality and are usually dark green or grey brown in colour with little decoration present.
Sub-Nishapur ware
This type is characterized by a soft reddish brown fabric with a dark brown slip on a yellow background and likely originates in eastern or southern Iran during the tenth or eleventh centuries.

=== Unglazed Islamic wares ===
These wares comprise 50% of the assemblage in the first period, which is rather unusual as this type of pottery is very rare in other East African sites. All specimens appear to have been wheel thrown.

==== Types of unglazed Islamic wares ====
Unglazed Islamic wares found at Manda are generally identified by vessel type.

==== Storage jars ====
The storage jars fall into 5 categories.

Massive Jars
Massive jars are highly decorated with incised work, have very short necks with small handles between the neck and the top of the body and can be pink, purple, or red in color.
Jars with tall necks
Jars with tall necks are not as large as the massive jars and are thin-bodied. They have a fine fabric, which is typically red, sometimes with a black slip. The jars may have come with strap handles, but it is not known for sure as no vessels have been found with handles.
Deep Crocks
Deep crocks with incised decoration have a moderately thickened rim and a hard red fabric. The deep scored decoration is akin to that found on the massive jars and they perhaps originate from Siraf. They are fairly common.
Hole mouth jars
Hole mouth jars come in a soft green buff fabric and are fairly rare.

==== Basins ====
Basins come in three varieties.

Straight sides
Basins with nearly straight sides have a flat base, a plain rim, and are ellipsoid in shape. They come in a red fabric with a cream slip and the only decorated example consists of wavy incised lines around the rim.
Widely flaring bases
Only a single specimen of this variety has been found at Manda. It has a buff fabric covered by lighter fabric slip and the upper surface of the mouth is decorated with a chevron pattern consisting of 4 deeply incised lines.
Ledge rims
Basins with a wide, flat topped, horizontal ledge rim, with crosshatching are around 30-40 cm in height and are relatively thin body compared to other types of basins. They can be pink, buff, or grey and are never fired the same color all the way through, along with a white slip with incised decoration.

==== Bowls ====
There are two types of bowls. One is open with straight sides, a plain rim, and a flat base. The only ornamentation on this type is a groove located below the rim and it is covered by a dense, usually cream colored but occasionally brown, fabric. The other type is a handled bowl with a spout which is between 25 and 35 cm in diameter. They both have a moulded rim with marked carination, small vertical handles with a ridge down the middle, short spouts and are cream or buff in color; there is a single example in red with a white slip.

==== Handled vessels in buff fabric ====
There is a very large assemblage of this type with a variety of vessels in a number of sizes. Most come with handles and are usually generally covered with a soft porous fabric. There are large jars that can be up to 50–60 cm in height, but they also come as jugs and pitchers. The bases of these vessels are usually flat or slightly recessed, but there have been examples found at Manda that exhibit ring bases. One example is decorated with a molded wavy lines around the base. Another example has a deep red coloring both inside and out. They are thinly potted and covered in a green buff fabric in the case of the larger vessels and the fabric very closely resembles the paste color found on the Hole mouth jars mentioned previously. There are examples, however, of the larger vessels in a decidedly pink tinge. The smaller jugs, on the other hand, tend to have a cream colour rather than a buff one, and said buff often has a green tinge to it. The fabric on these vessels is also very absorbent and rubs off as a fine dust any time it is handled. The decoration on these vessels is usually limited to the upper part of the vessels, and usually consists of incised line designs, but there are also examples of vessels of this type decorated with moulding. When these moulded designs are present, they are usually on the handles of the vessel, which are in turn sometimes decorated with a very distinctive knob-like design at the upper curve. These handles can be grouped into two classes; one is rather close in appearance to the Amphora style, and the other is cast in two pieces, always with a figure eight section. This type of pottery is also called Siraf cream with the more “refined” varieties being labelled as Gudulia and Eggshell ware. This type of pottery is also remarkably similar to jugs that are found in an early Islamic city called Susa. Of the specimens of this style found at Manda, the largest percentage were found in early period I deposits, with a few found in deposits that are likely a mix of both periods I and II and several that date to later periods. This style also has a pilgrim bottle shape that is present in deposits at Kilwa that are not present in Manda deposits.

=== Painted ware ===
Only three specimens of this type have been found, all of them body sherds which appear to be from jars or bottles. Of the sherds, the largest one shows a coarse crimson fabric with black paint, over a buff slip. The other two sherds, on the other hand, are coloured with a reddish buff paste with one exhibiting a very thin layer of a green glaze. These sherds date to Period I and are possibly related to painted wares from Susa.

==== Miscellaneous fragments ====
There are a number of rim sherds from vessels of unknown form but thought to possibly of very deep bowls. The fabric of these vessels is distinctly sandy and usually comes in a pink or red shade. There is a single sample of a large, very thickly potted vessel, whose fabric is a light green buff. The sides of this vessel are nearly vertical. There is also a single sherd that appears to have been from the late ninth century which is believed to be a pseudo Sigilatta style slipware. There is also a single sherd of a grey impressed ware vessel which seems to be of a closed wheel thrown variety, perhaps some sort of jug or bottle. The sherd shows a grey-brown paste and is decorated with tooled incised lines and a walked motif.

=== Pottery of Indian origin ===
Pottery of this origin consists almost entirely of water pots. They are always unglazed but their fabric is distinct from those found on either local or known Islamic pottery. These vessels are highly unsuited for cooking but there are two specimens in the assemblage that show blackening from fire. These vessels have noticeably out-turned rims, along with very narrow mouths. The profile of these vessels is rather low and wide as well. The fabric comes in a rather large variety, though the characteristic fabric for this type is a grey shade with a sizable amount of chaff or the like. Some of these vessels are fired buff or red though and there are some with a black grit. These vessels are primarily of Period I but there are examples from Period II and later.

=== Local pottery ===
The entirety of pottery made in Africa south of the Sahara was unglazed and made without the use of a wheel. These vessels were either coiled or moulded into shape; there are, however, a small number of specimens that are pinched into shape. These vessels are always made by open firing rather than firing in a kiln. There is also no acceptable source of clay on the island so while the pottery might be of the local style, where the vessels came from is unknown. There are some that are likely to have been manufactured on the coast, due to the presence of shell fragments in the paste.

==== Fabrics on local pottery ====
The majority of local pottery has a fabric that is extremely soft and very easily removed. The core is usually a black surface and the colors upon it range from pink and red to grey and a near true black. There are four types of fabric that can be found in the local pottery at Manda. The first is a very dark, very crumbly fabric. The second is referred to as Hard Fabric. This fabric rather rare in local pottery, and is characterized by a relatively hard and compacted paste. Refractory fabric is called so for the large amounts of quartz grains within, and its fabric has a very coarse and gritty feel to it. This type of fabric is only found in crucibles. The final type is the Pink fabric which is only found in painted wares imported from further south. The surface of these ranges from pink to red, and the paste is rather sandy. These vessels are fired pink to buff throughout.

=== Early kitchen wares ===
The first type of Early Kitchen wares is divided into 9 categories and all of them are bag shaped vessels with tall rims that curve outward and an “s” shaped neck. This type is usually decorated with incised decorations, though there is an inverse correlation between the size of the vessel and the skill involved in the decoration; usually the larger the vessel the less skilled the decoration. This type is also characteristic of period I

Type 1a
This subtype has very fine decoration, likely created with a metal blade of some sort. The decoration is one of a variety of different rectilinear designs. In the entire assemblage of this subtype there are 150 variations, with a very small number having no decoration whatsoever.
Type 1b
The rectilinear decorations on this subtype are usually created when the clay is leather hard with some type of rounded implement. Occasionally, in addition to the rectilinear designs, there are lunate stab marks bound along the bottom of the design band. These vessels also occasionally have a row of incised crosses around the outer rim.
Type 1c
The vessels of this subtype are thicker relative to the others and the decorations are very rough. The incisions are done before the clay has become leather hard and the designs usually take a diagonal and triangular pattern.
Type 1d
This subtype is highly similar to 1c with the sole exception that the incised designs are much lighter.
Type 1e
These vessels have very narrow necks and harder fabrics than the previous subtypes and are also found Period II.
Type 1f
These actually have puncture decoration rather than incised decoration around the neck, which have very slight stepping; the puncture decoration is sometimes combined with notches on the rim of the vessels.
Type 1g
These vessels have a pronounced “s” profile, and rectilinear decoration.

== Significance ==
The reason that pottery at Manda is so significant is the fact that none of the pottery found at Manda originated there. This fact, in addition to the fact that Manda is an island, gives an inkling as to exactly how important trade was to the early town. The vast geographic range of the pottery found at Manda also gives archaeologists an idea of just how far-flung the trading ties Manda and the rest of the Swahili coast were.
