= Mbweni =

Mbweni may refer to:

- Mbweni, Kinondoni District, Dar es Salaam Region, Tanzania
- Mbweni, Magharibi District, Mjini Magharibi Region, Tanzania
