= KWY =

KWY or kwy may refer to:

- KWY, the IATA code for Kiwayu Airport, Lamu District, Coast Province, Kenya
- kwy, the ISO 639-3 code for San Salvador Kongo language, Democratic Republic of the Congo, the Republic of the Congo, Angola and Gabon
