= Mkama Ndume =

National Historic Site of Tanzania

Mkama Ndume Palace Ruins
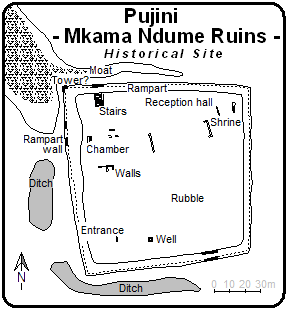
- Drawing of Palace

- Location within Tanzania
- 5°17′52.08″S 39°48′28.8″E
- Type: Settlement
- Cultures: Swahili
- Location: Chake Chake District, Pemba South Region, Tanzania

History
- Built: 15th century CE
- Abandoned: 16th century CE

Site notes
- Material: Coral rag
- Architectural styles: Swahili & Islamic
- Condition: Endangered
- Owner: Tanzanian Government
- Management: Antiquities Division, Ministry of Natural Resources and Tourism

National Historic Sites of Tanzania
- Official name: Mkama Ndume Historic Site
- Type: Cultural

Mkama Ndume Ruins (Magofu ya mji wa kale wa Mkama Ndume in Swahili ) was a medieval Swahili settlement palace ruins located in Chake Chake District of Pemba South Region that was abandoned in the 16th Century prior to Portuguese arrival and is known for its fortification. The site is located 10 km (6.2 mi) east of the town of Chake-Chake. The settlement was ruled by a leader named Mohammed bin Abdul Rahman, who was known for his cruelty towards his subjects thus earned his infamous nickname Mkama Ndume meaning milker of men in old Swahili. The settlement ruins bear this nickname.

== See also ==
- Historic Swahili Settlements
- Swahili architecture
- National Historic Sites in Tanzania
