= Mduuni =

National Historic Site of Tanzania

Mduuni Ruins
- Location within Tanzania
- 4°59′0″S 39°41′0″E
- Type: Settlement
- Cultures: Swahili
- Location: Micheweni District, Pemba North Region, Tanzania

History
- Built: 13-14th century CE

Site notes
- Material: Coral rag
- Architectural styles: Swahili & Islamic
- Condition: Endangered
- Owner: Tanzanian Government
- Management: Antiquities Division, Ministry of Natural Resources and Tourism

National Historic Sites of Tanzania
- Official name: Mduuni Ruins Historic Site
- Type: Cultural

Mduuni Ruins (Swahili Mji wa Kale wa Msuka Mjini) is a protected historic site located inside Micheweni District of Pemba North Region in Tanzania. The settlement was established around 1100 CE.

== See also ==
- Historic Swahili Settlements
- Archaeology of Pemba Island
