= Mnarani, Tanzania =

Medieval Swahili settlement in Tanga Region

Mnarani Ruins
- Magofu ya Mnarani (Swahili)
- Type: Medieval Settlement
- Cultures: Swahili
- Location: Tanzania
- Region: Tanga Region
- Part of: Swahili Culture

History
- Built: unknown
- Built by: Swahili people
- Abandoned: unknown

Site notes
- Material: Coral rag
- Excavation dates: none
- Owner: Tanzanian Government
- Management: Ministry of Natural Resources and Tourism, Antiquities Division
- Public access: Yes

Mnarani ruins (Swahili Magofu ya Mnarani) is a Swahili historic site located in Tanga Region, Tanzania.It is home to Medieval Swahili ruins that have yet to be excavated.

== See also ==
- Historic Swahili Settlements
- National Historic Sites in Tanzania
- Swahili architecture
