= Mkunumbi =

- Location within Kenya
- Coordinates: 2.31°S 40.7°E
- Country: Kenya
- Province: Coast Province
- Time zone: UTC+3 (EAT)

Mkunumbi is a historic Swahili settlement in Kenya's Coast Province.

== See also ==
- Historic Swahili Settlements
- Swahili architecture
