= Kiwayu Airport =

- IATA: KWY; ICAO: none

Summary
- Airport type: Public, Civilian
- Operator: Kenya Airports Authority
- Serves: Kiwayu, Lamu District, Coast Province, Kenya
- Location: Kenya
- Elevation AMSL: 7 m / 23 ft
- Coordinates: 01°57′38″S 041°17′51″E
- Website: Homepage

Map
- Location of the airport in Kenya

Runways
Direction	Length		Surface
Direction	ft	m	Surface
04/22	3,000	920	Unpaved

Kiwayu Airport (IATA: KWY) is an airport serving Kiwayu (also spelled Kiwayuu), a small island in the eastern part of the Lamu Archipelago off the coast of Kenya. The airstrip is located on the mainland, adjacent to the northern tip of Kiwayu Island. This location lies in Lamu District, Coast Province, on the western shores of the Indian Ocean.

Its location is approximately 451 kilometres (280 mi), by air, southeast of Nairobi International Airport, the country's largest civilian airport.

== Overview ==
The airport is a small-sized airport that serves the island of Kiwayu and surrounding communities. Situated at 21 feet (6.4 m) above sea level, the airport has a single unpaved runway 04-22 that measures 3,000 feet (910 m) long.

== Airlines and destinations ==
Airlines	Destinations
Safarilink	Lamu, Nairobi–Wilson

== See also ==
- Kiwayu
- Lamu District
- Lamu Archipelago
- Coast Province
- Kenya Airports Authority
- Kenya Civil Aviation Authority
- List of airports in Kenya
