= Kipungani =

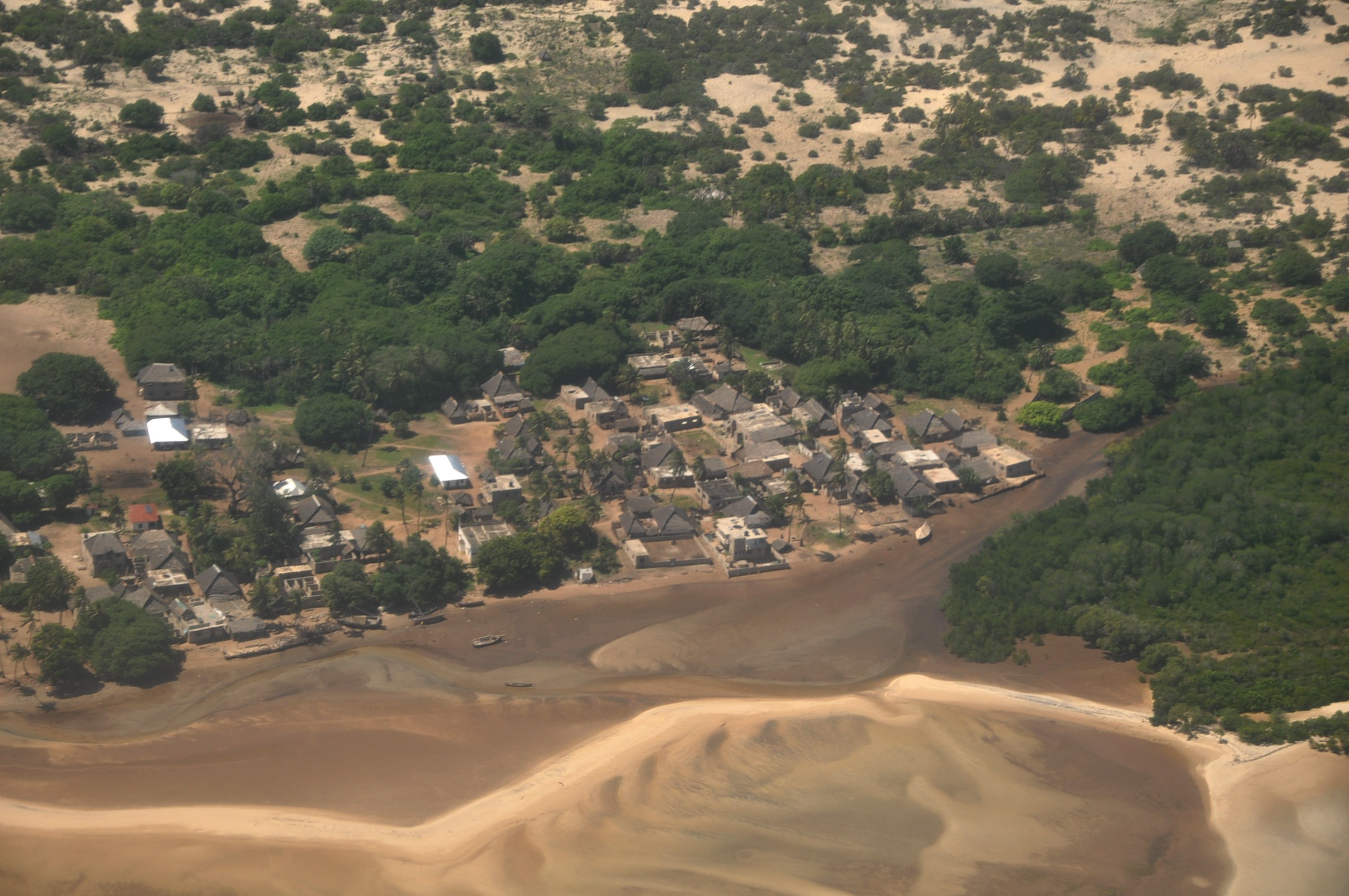

- Location within Kenya
- Coordinates: 2.3084°S 40.8161°E
- Country: Kenya
- Province: Coast Province
- Time zone: UTC+3 (EAT)

Kipungani is a historic Swahili settlement on Lamu Island in Kenya's Coast Province.

== See also ==
- Historic Swahili Settlements
- Swahili architecture
