= Chukwani =

Town in Zanzibar, Tanzania

Coordinates: 6°14′S 39°13′E

Chukwani is a suburb on the Tanzanian island of Unguja, part of Zanzibar. It is located in the west of the island, south of Mbweni, Zanzibar, and not far from Abeid Amani Karume International Airport
