= Kiwayu =

Island in the Kiunga Marine National Reserve in Kenya

Coordinates: 2°00′20.81″S 41°16′33.95″E

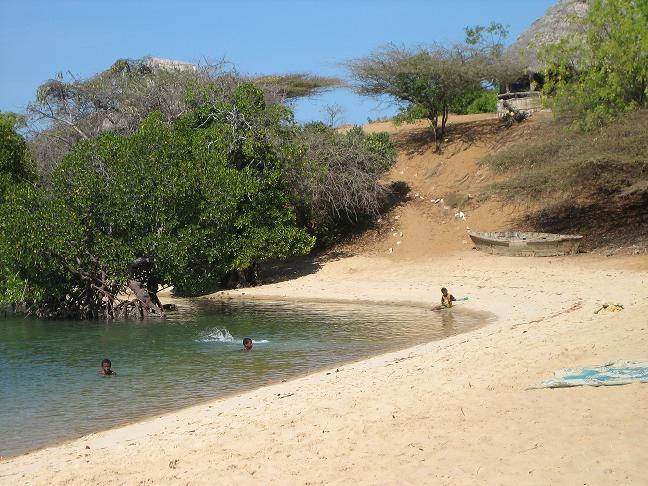
- Interactive map of Kiwayu

Geography
- Archipelago: Lamu

Administration
- Kenya

Kiwayuu (alternative spelling Kiwayu) is a small island in the eastern part of the Lamu Archipelago in the Kiunga Marine National Reserve in Kenya. Its main economic activity is fishing, and there is one school, one clinic and one well on the island. Its main attractions are the tidal pools and snorkeling/diving pools on its eastern side, in the Indian Ocean.

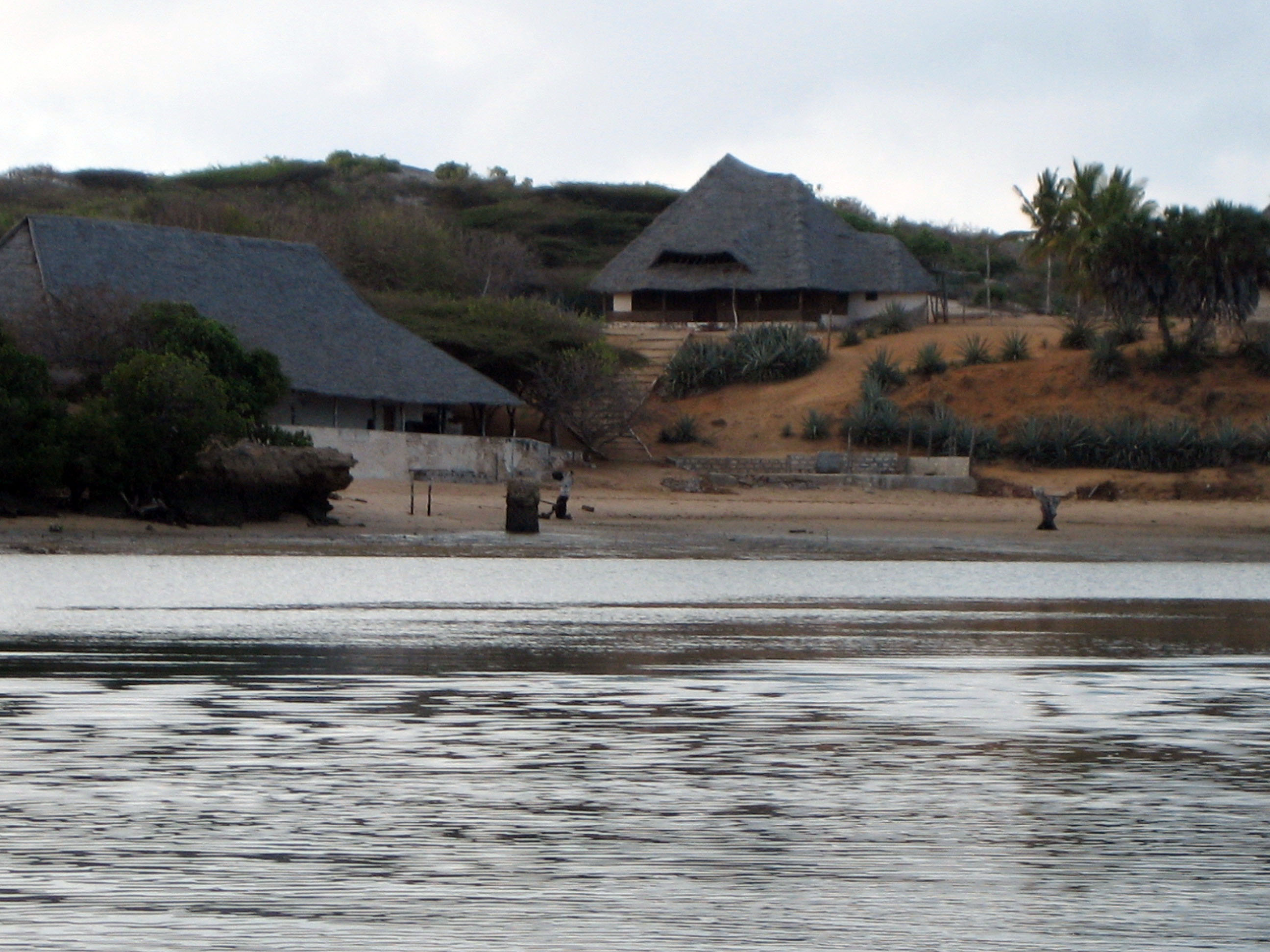
The west side of Kiwayuu Island

The nearest hospital is on Lamu Island outside of Lamu town. Travel from Kiwayuu to Lamu is 7 hours by dhow, or 2 hours by motor boat.

== See also ==
- Kiwayu Airport
- Historic Swahili Settlements
- Swahili architecture
