= Manda Island =

Island of the Lamu Archipelago of Kenya

Coordinates: 2°16′S 40°58′E

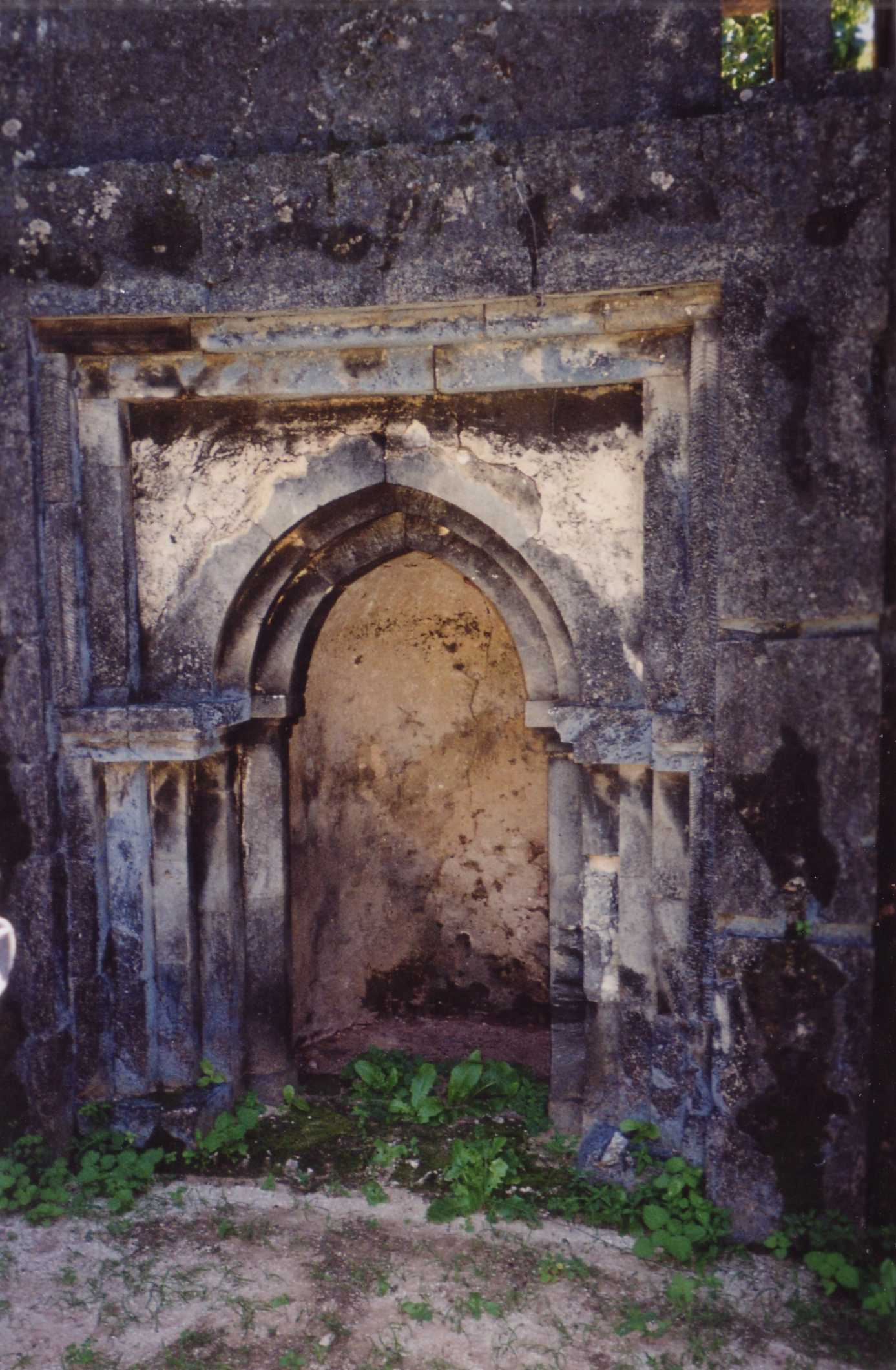
- Takwa Ruins Mihrab

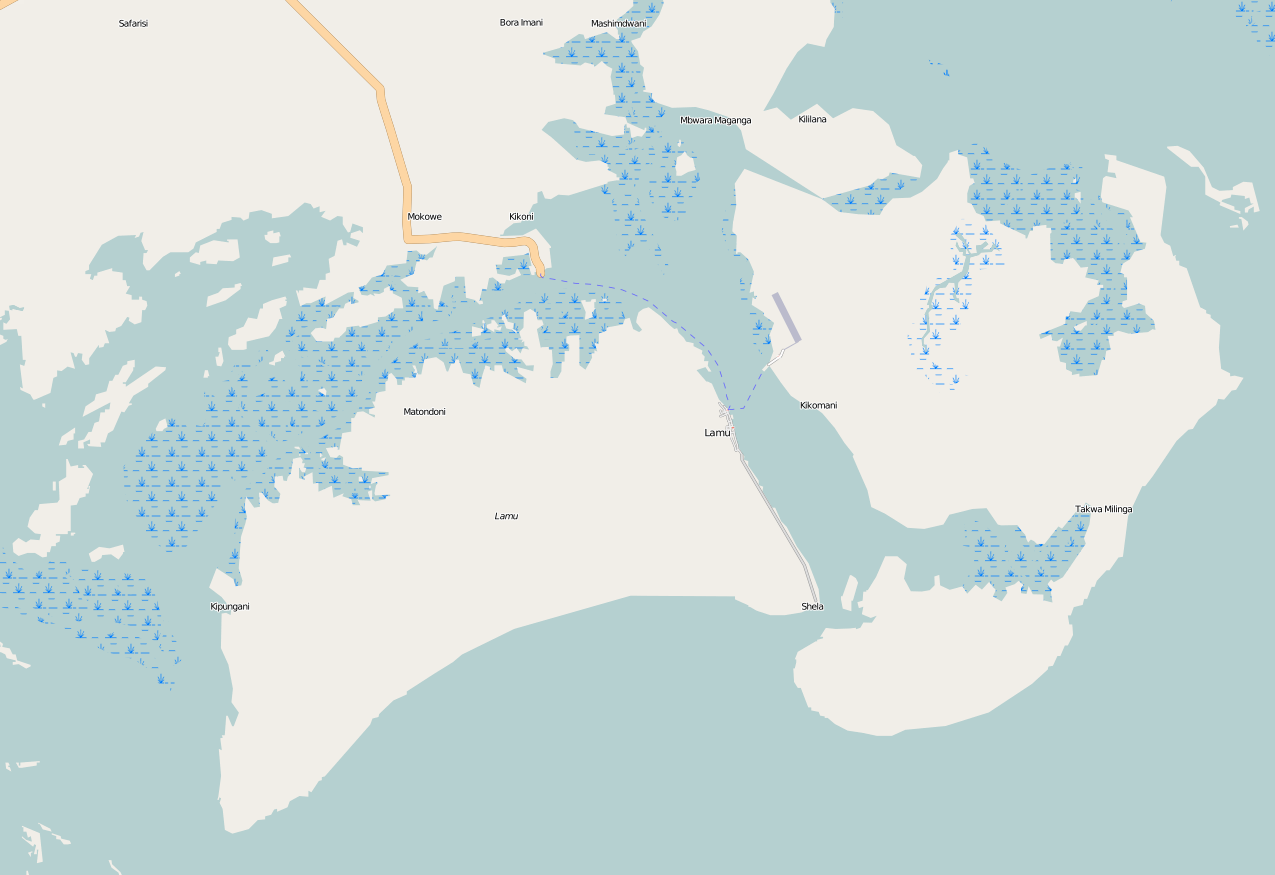
- Manda Island (right) and Lamu Island (left)

Geography
- Archipelago: Lamu Archipelago

Administration
- Kenya
- County: Lamu County

Manda is an island of the Lamu Archipelago of Kenya, known for the prosperous 9th century ports of Takwa and Manda town. The island is now linked by ferry to Lamu and is home to Manda Airport, while Manda Toto island lies to its west. The island is separated from the mainland by the narrow Mkanda channel.

Both Manda town and Takwa were probably abandoned due to a lack of water in the first half of the 19th century. In the 1960s the Kenya Department of Agriculture recommended building several concrete catchments called jabias to capture rain water on the island. Two jabias were built and many families moved onto the island, farming maize, cassava, simsim and cotton.

== Manda town ==
=== History ===
The Manda town ruins (on the Northwest coast of Manda Island), were first explored by the archaeologist Neville Chittick in 1965. The town owes its origins to trade with the Persian Gulf during the 9th and 10th centuries. The chief trading commodity was probably elephant ivory. Mangrove poles were probably also important. Early inhabitants of Manda constructed buildings with burnt square brick and stone and set with a lime mortar. These building techniques are found only on islands and coastal areas of Kenya. This brick and mortar technology is unique to the previously mentioned areas whereas the bricks averaging about 18 cm (7") (which "match perfectly ...in measure") are unique for East Africa for this period, and are likely to have been brought in from Sohar, in modern-day Oman. These bricks probably arrived on Manda Island as ballast in sailing ships entering the port. From the mid-9th century to the early 11th century buildings were also constructed from coral known as coral rag cut from dead coral reefs.

The large scale excavations in 1966, 1970, and 1978 revealed a prosperity unrivaled in East Africa for the period. Signs of this prosperity include Chinese porcelain dating from the ninth century onward, Islamic pottery and glass, and local pottery dated by the associated imports. Chittick defines 7 periods for occupation of Manda Island: Mid-9th to early 11th century, Mid-11th to late 13th century, late 13th to 14th century, 15th and early 16th century, Mid-16th to 17th century, and Post-seventeenth century. A striking feature of the town are large sea walls built sometime between the 9th century to the 13th century. The walls parallel the shore and are built from large coral blocks. These walls were likely constructed to reclaim sections of the shoreline. Running parallel with the sea with returns running inland, these walls built from large coral blocks are deduced to have been constructed partly to reclaim sections of the shore, and partly to consolidate the edges of the peninsula.

In the July 2013 issue of Archeology it was reported that a Chinese "Yongle Tongbao" cash coin was found on Manda Island, illustrating the reach of Chinese explorers and trade. The coin was issued during the reign of the Yongle Emperor, Zhu Di which lasted until 1424.

At its peak, the town covered some 40 acres (160,000 m^{2}) and its population is estimated to have been about 3,500. Manda prospered until the 13th century when it began to decline.

Ancient DNA analysis has been completed for 3 buried Manda Island individuals in order to determine the proportions of "African-like, Persian-like, and Indian-like" DNA sequences. The location of the analyzed burials next to mosques is indicative of an elite status in the Manda society. The individuals were dated to between 1400 and 1500 AD. Analysis was completed of the individual's mitochondrial DNA (mtDNA), autosomal DNA, Y chromosome DNA, and X chromosome DNA. Analysis of mtDNA, demonstrating maternal ancestry patterns, showed a L* haplotype. The L* haplotype is predominantly found in present-day Sub-Saharan African populations. Y chromosome analysis, demonstrating paternal ancestry patterns, showed that the individual was carrying the J2 haplotype, found more frequently in Southwest Asian or Persian individuals compared to Sub-Saharan African individuals. X chromosomes, containing larger maternal influence, was compared with the 22 autosomal chromosomes, which contain equal maternal and paternal influence. X chromosomes contained more indicators of African ancestry compared to autosomal DNA, further adding to evidence of African ancestry on the maternal side and Persian or Southeast Asian ancestry on the paternal side. The proportion of female African DNA from the samples analyzed was quantified by the authors to be 100%.

Introduction of foreign DNA was estimated to have occurred between 795 and 1085 AD. However, the authors indicate that this likely occurred over "multiple generations" and that mixture of Eurasian and African populations have continually occurred since.

== Takwa ==
The Takwa Ruins was a town in the period 1500–1700, and it was designated a Kenyan National Monument in 1982.

== Manda Airport ==
Manda Airport is the only civilian airport in the Lamu Archipelago.

== In popular culture ==
Part of the events in the novel Our Wild Sex in Malindi (Chapters 14 and 15) by Andrei Gusev takes place on the Manda Island and in neighboring Lamu.

== See also ==
- Historic Swahili Settlements
- Swahili architecture
