= Takwa =

Town ruins on Manda Island, Kenya

Coordinates: 2°17′54.55″S 40°57′30.32″E

The Takwa settlement is situated on the south side of Manda Island, in the Lamu District in the coastal province of Kenya. They are the ruins of a town which was abandoned around the 18th century.

The Takwa site can be easily reached from Lamu town. The ruins were first excavated by James Kirkman in 1951. In 1972 the site was cleared again under the supervision of James de Vere Allen, the Curator of the Lamu Museum.

Takwa was never a large place. It was founded around 1500, and probably abandoned around 1700. Kirkman thought that it was perhaps a place where holy men or religious people retreated. The Great Mosque at Takwa is relatively well preserved. The other structure of importance is the Pillar Tomb, which has an inscription with the date of 1681–1682. It is reported that when Takwa was abandoned, its inhabitants settled just across the bay at Shela on Lamu Island. Twice a year the people of Shela come to the Pillar Tomb in Takwa to pray for rain. The Takwa Ruins were designated a Kenyan National Monument in 1982.

== Gallery ==
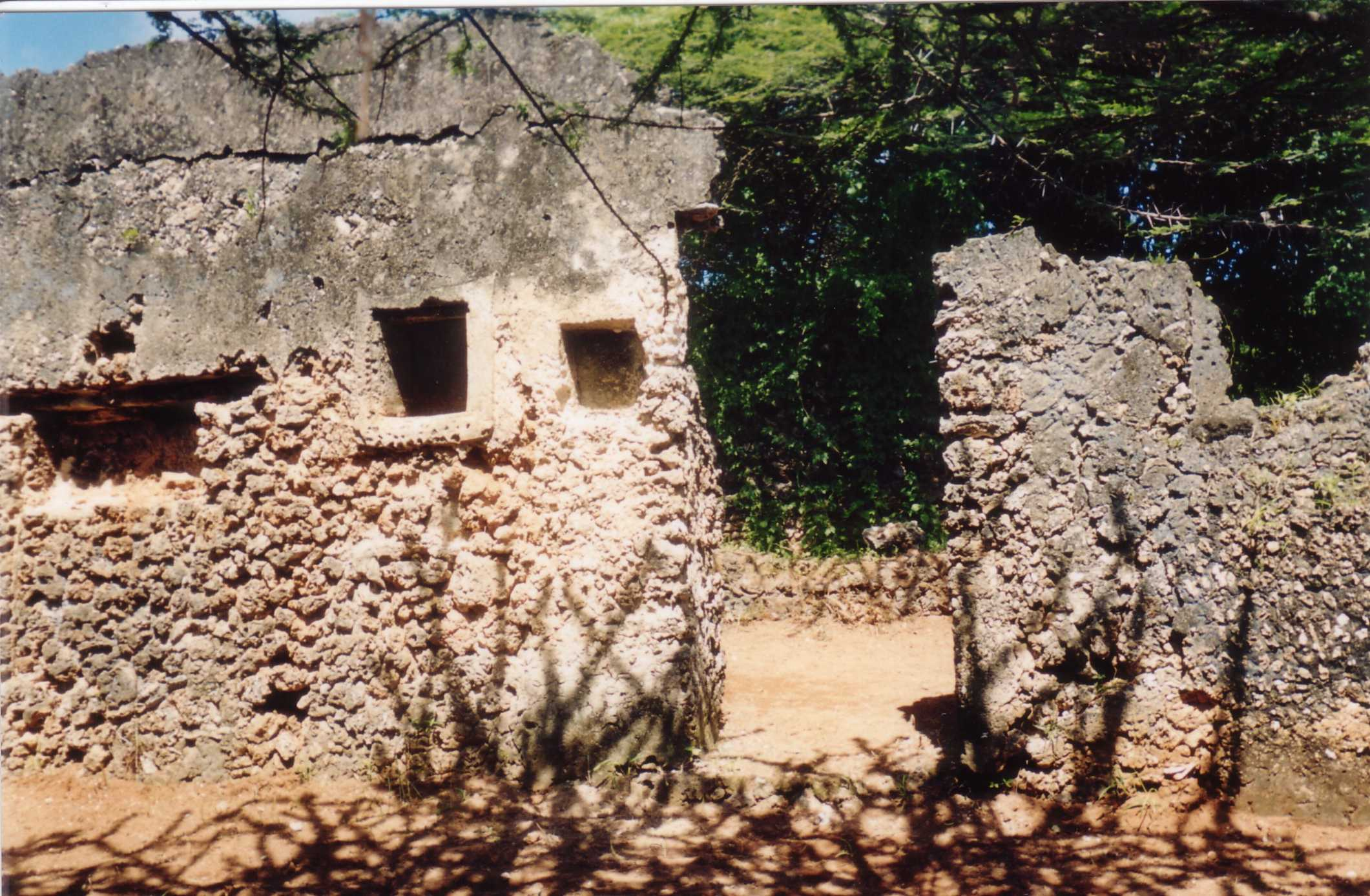
Takwa Ruins-Building

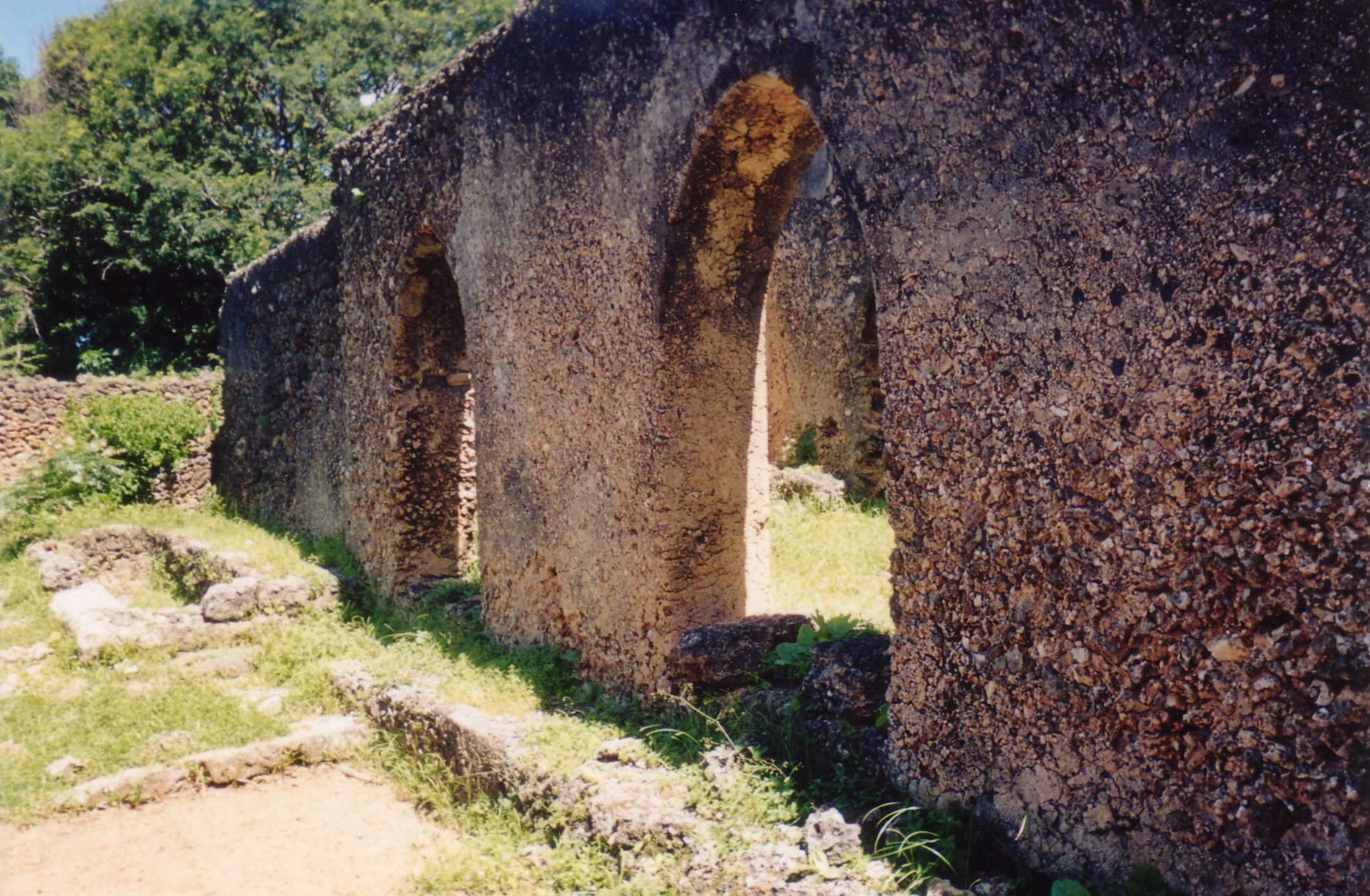
Takwa Ruins-Wall

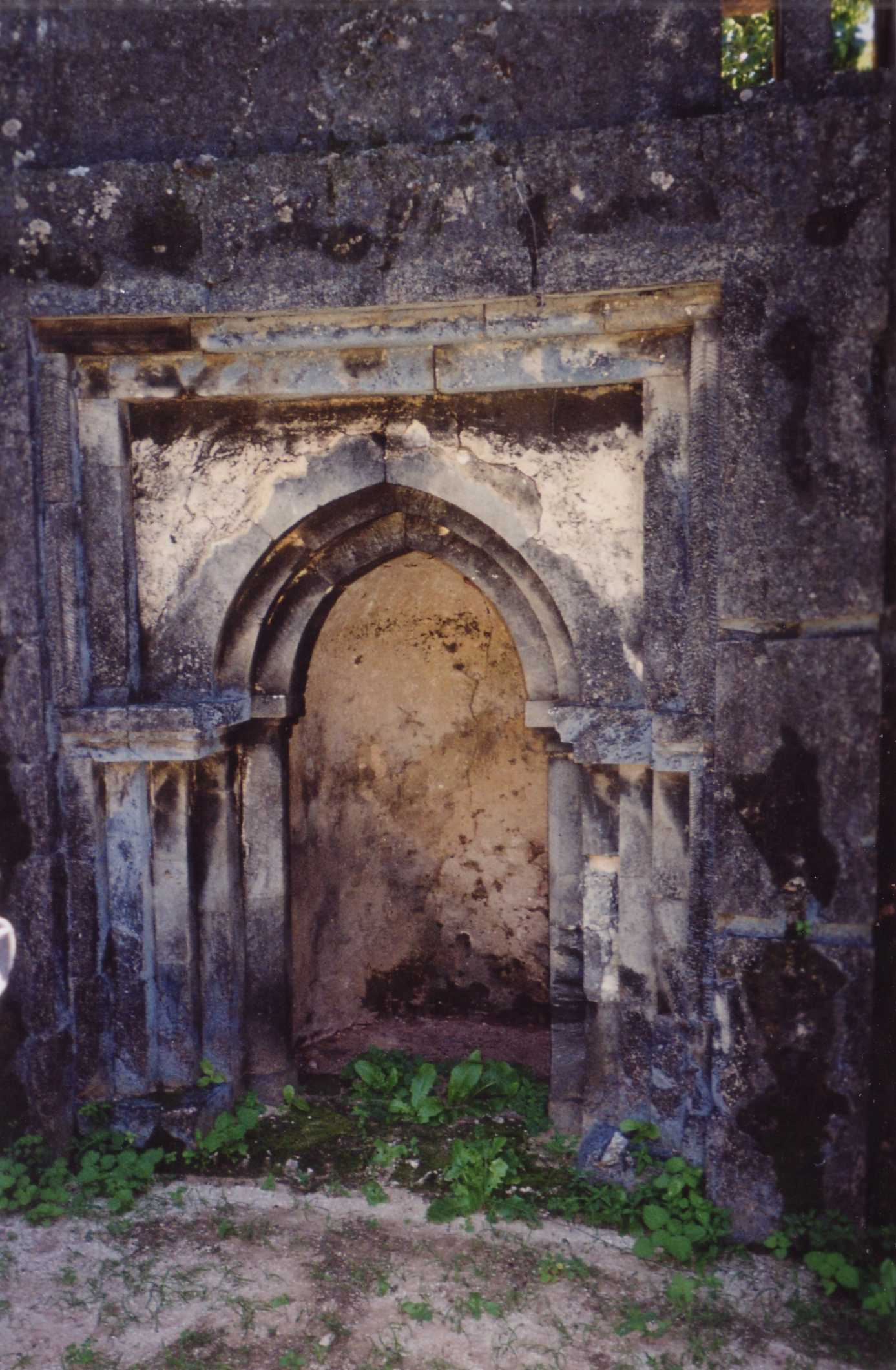
Takwa Ruins-Mihrab

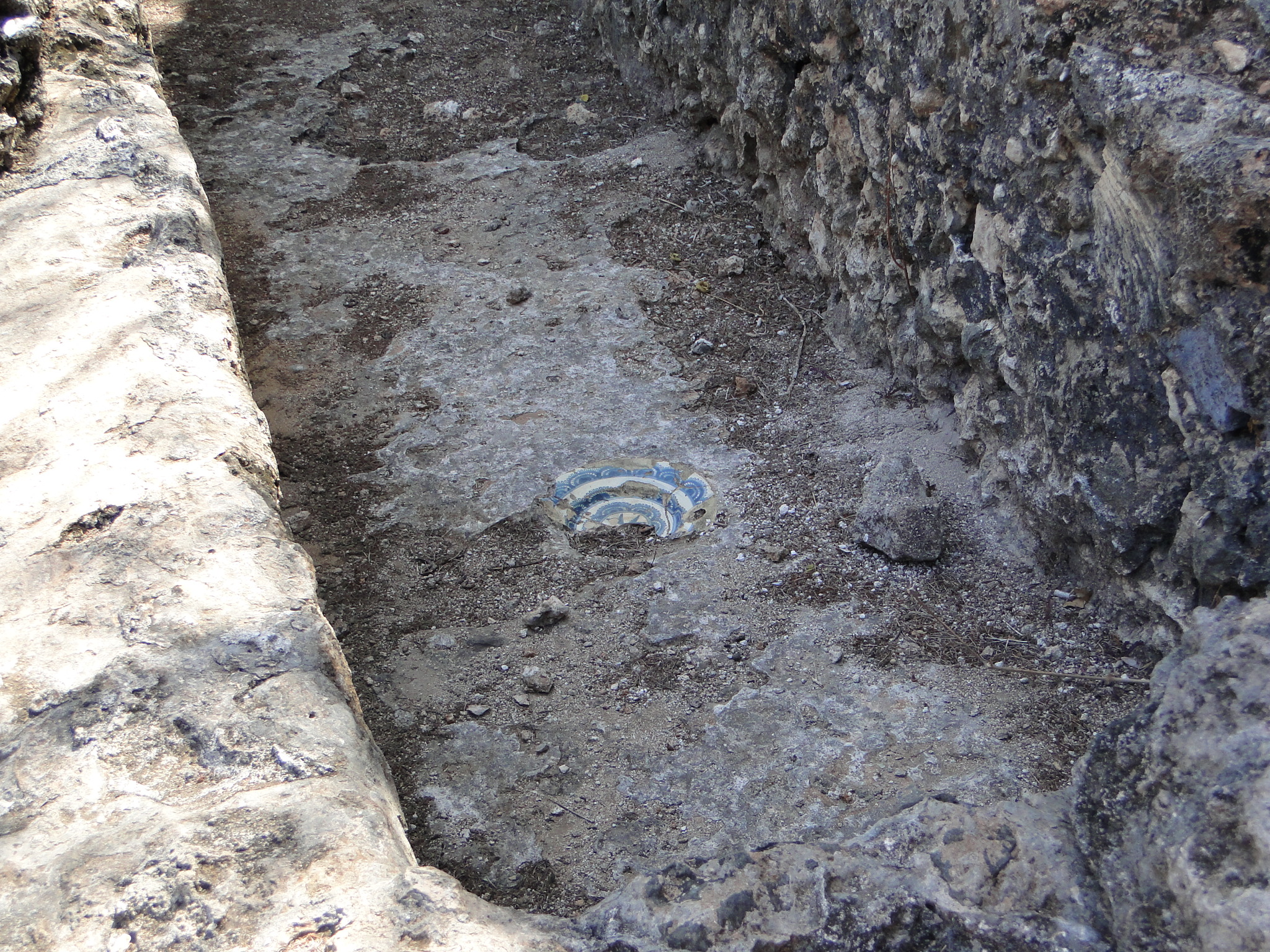
Takwa Ruins Wudu

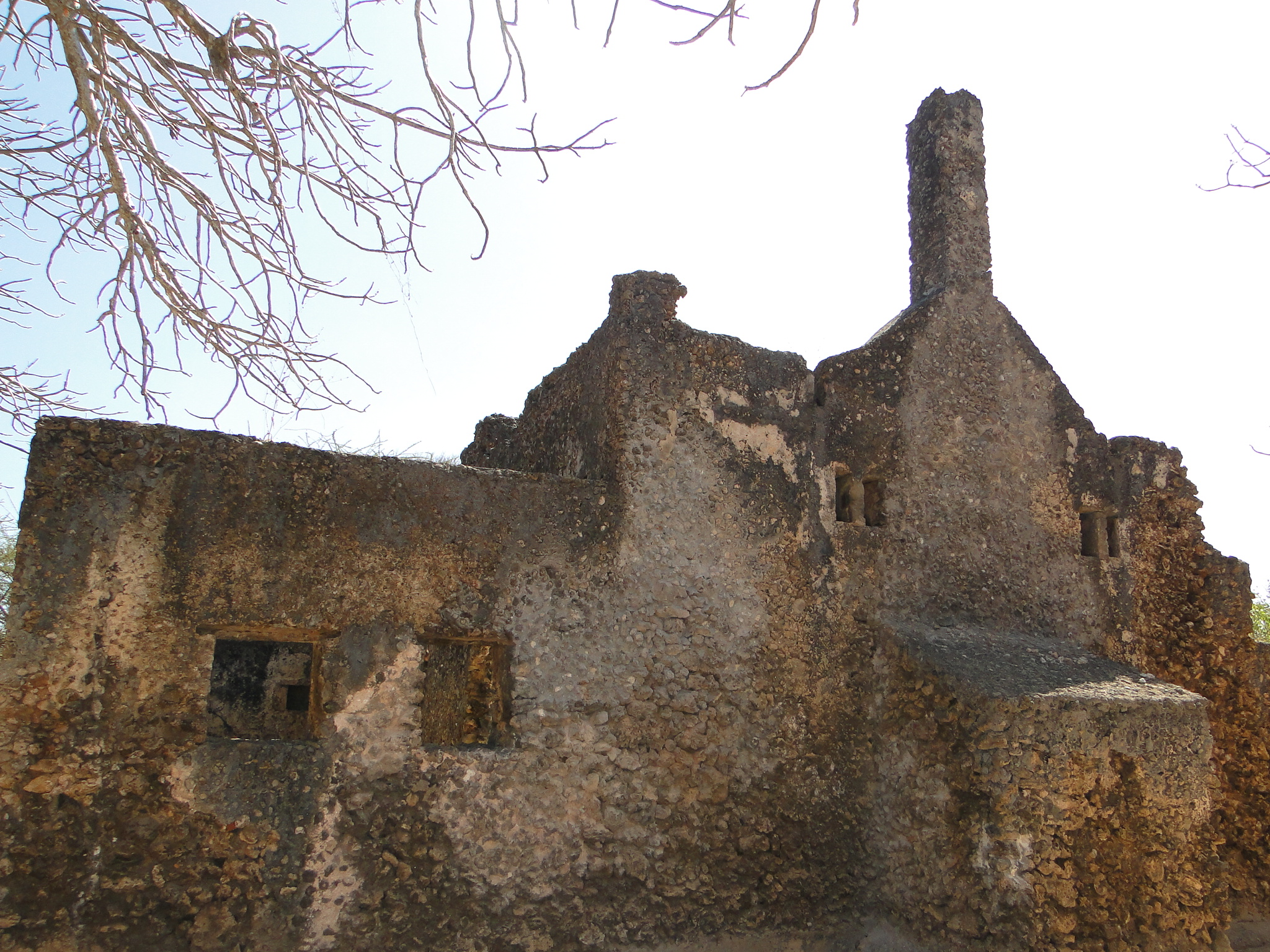
Takwa Ruins Mosque wall

== See also ==
- Historic Swahili Settlements
- Swahili architecture

== Bibliography ==
- Martin, Chryssee MacCasler Perry and Esmond Bradley Martin: Quest for the Past. An historical guide to the Lamu Archipelago. 1973.
