= Mchinga =

Ward in Lindi District, Lindi Region

Mchinga Kata ya Chumo (Swahili)
- Ward
- Kata ya Mchinga, Wilaya ya Lindi
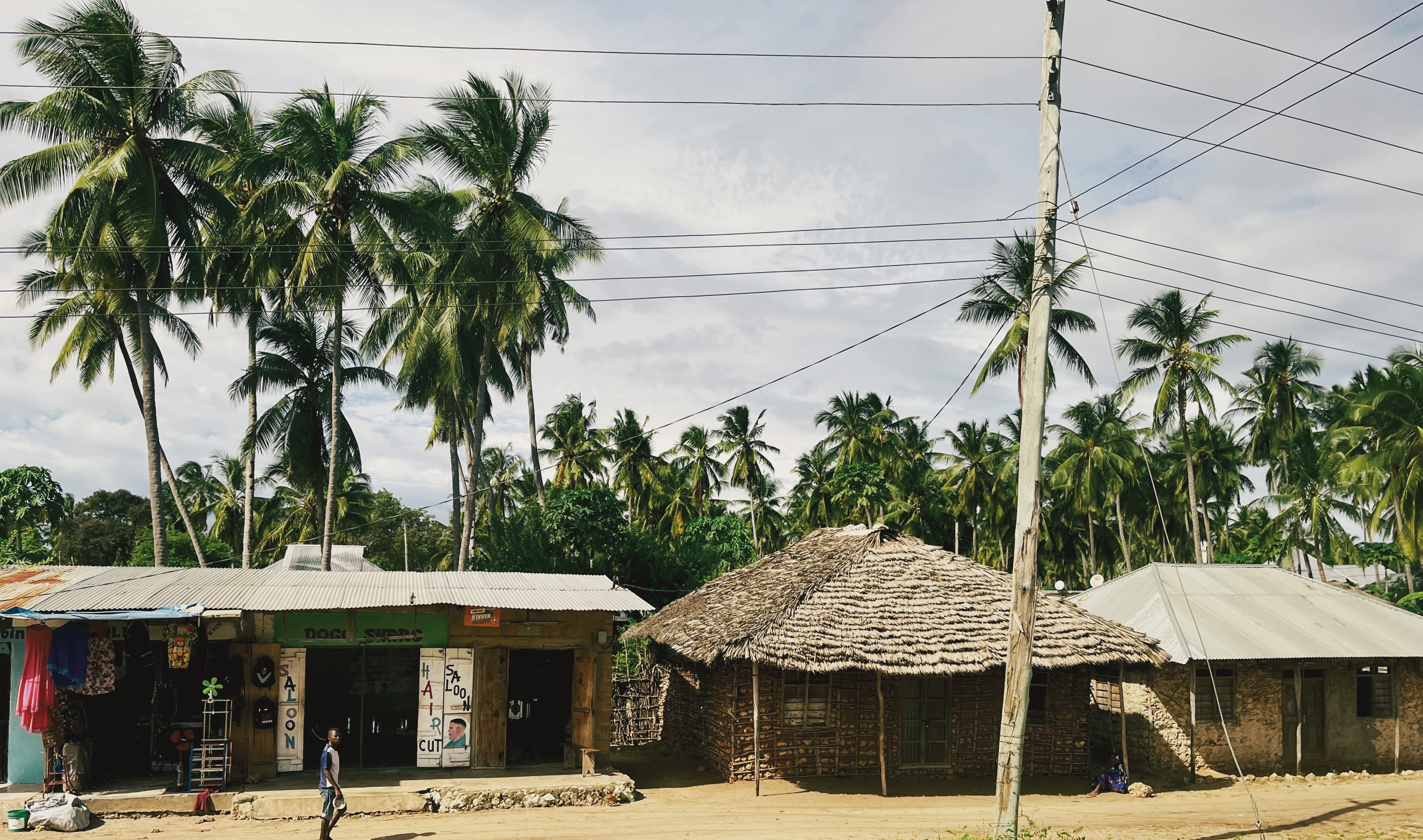
- Mchinga Scene in Lindi District

- Location within Tanzania
- Country: Tanzania
- Region: Lindi Region
- District: Lindi District

Area
  - Total: 36.4 km^{2} (14.1 sq mi)
- Elevation: 45 m (148 ft)

Population (2012)
  - Total: 6,063
  - Density: 167/km^{2} (431/sq mi)

Ethnic groups
  - Settler: Swahili
  - Native: Machinga people
- Tanzanian Postal Code: 65205

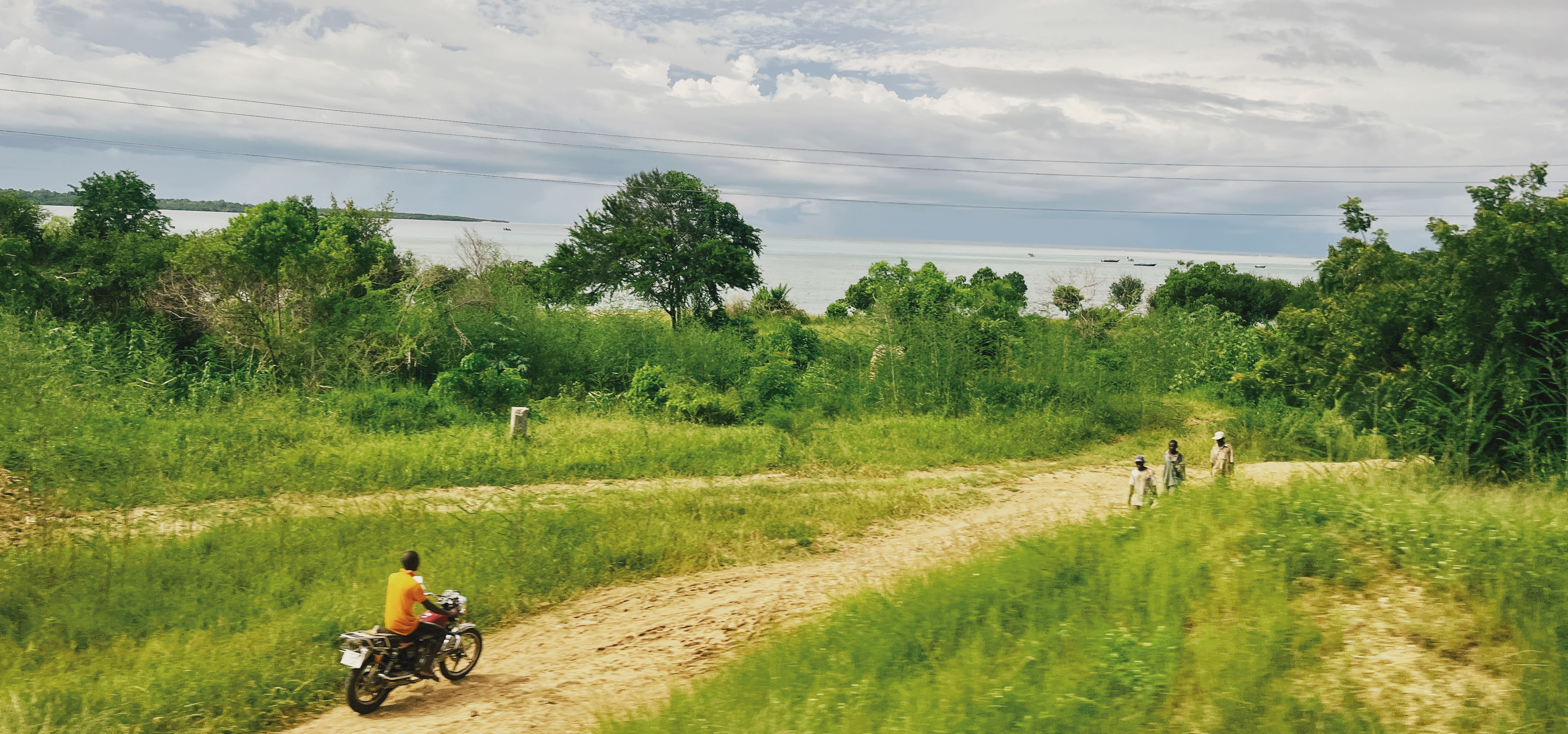
Backroads of Mchinga Ward, Lindi District

Mchinga is an administrative ward in Lindi District of Lindi Region in Tanzania. The ward covers an area of 136.6 km^{2} (52.7 sq mi), and has an average elevation of 45 m (148 ft). According to the 2012 census, the ward has a total population of 6,063.
