= Lamu Archipelago =

Kenyan archipelago on the Indian Ocean

Coordinates: 2°06′12″S 41°01′14″E

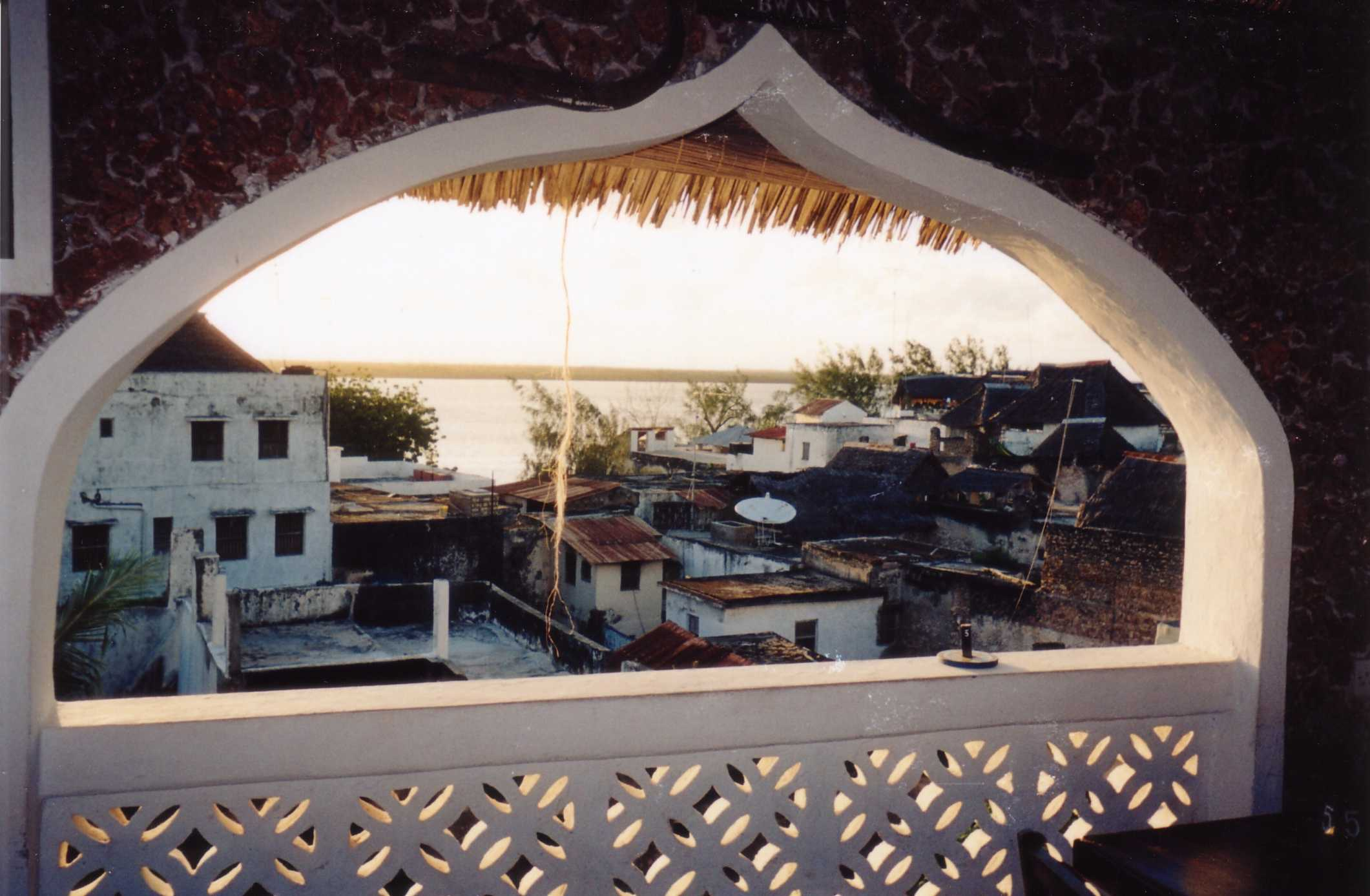
- View of Lamu town, on Lamu Island

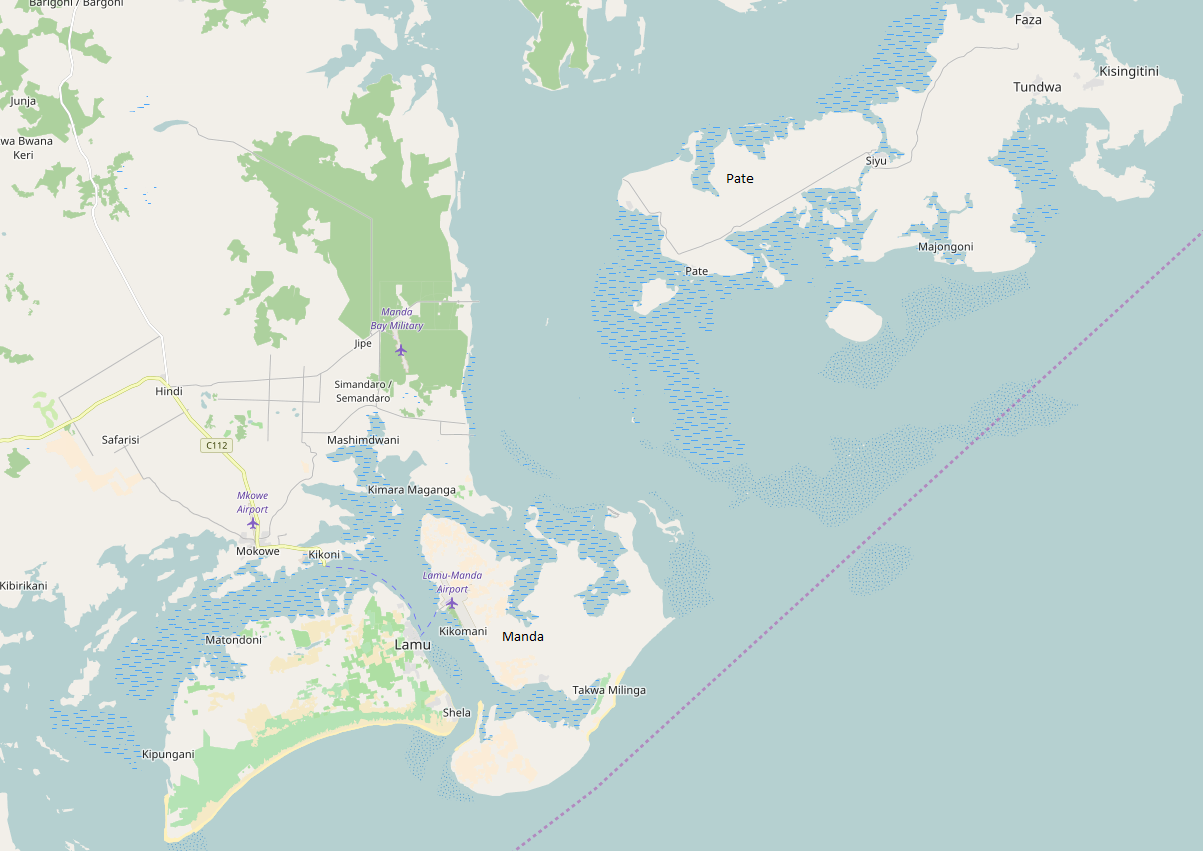

Geography
- Adjacent to: Indian Ocean
- Major islands: Pate Island, Manda Island and Lamu Island

Administration
- Kenya
- County: Lamu County

The Lamu Archipelago is located in the Indian Ocean close to the northern coast of Kenya, to which it belongs. The islands lie between the towns of Lamu and Kiunga. It is a part of Lamu County.

The largest of the islands are Pate Island, Manda Island and Lamu Island. Smaller islands include Kiwayu, which lies in the Kiunga Marine National Reserve, and Manda Toto. Today the largest town in the archipelago is Lamu Town, on Lamu Island. The town is on the World Heritage List. Lamu is also famous for its religious history, from its ancient wooden mosques to its distinctive practices at the Maulid Festival.

The archipelago contains several archaeological/historical sites of great significance, such as Takwa and Manda Town (both on Manda Island) and Shanga (on Pate Island). Some have been partially excavated in later years, shedding important new light on Swahili history and culture.

Also, the region is home to the Shirazi people, who claim partial descendance from Persia. This has been coroborated by genetic studies individuals in stone towns, who show ancestry from Africa, Arabia, Persia, and India.

There are some other accounts that mention Chinese ships of Zheng He's fleet sinking near Lamu Island in Kenya in 1415. Survivors settled on the island and married local women. This has been proven recently by archaeological work on the island that has resulted in the finding of evidence to suggest this connection. Further DNA testing done on some residents show that they indeed have Chinese ancestors.

== History and archaeology ==
The first references to the town of Lamu were recorded in 1441 A.D., where the qadi (judge) of Lamu was recorded to have visited Mecca. This likely means that the town had reached a significant size, as it had its own qadi. The local chronicles - - that Lamu was formed when two nearby towns, Hidabu and Weyuni, jointly chose to settle Lamu to achieve better stability. In 1506, the Portuguese explorer Tristao da Cunha set a blockade and established a tributary relationship with Lamu for Portugal. By the 17th century, the nearby town of Pate came to dominate the region. After warring with Pate and Mombasa, Lamu sought and received protectorship from the Sultan of Oman in 1812. A fort was subsequently garrisoned by Omani troops. Through the 19th century, Lamu was a holdout of the East African slave trade. Eventually, due to famine and European rivalries over the area, the town greatly declined in population. The old town is now a UNESCO World Heritage site, as it is the best-preserved traditional Swahili village in East Africa. The architecture at Lamu is a hallmark example of Swahili Architecture. Largely built from coral rag and mangrove wood, the town is known especially for its carved wooden doors, which has been shown to contain artistic elements observed from as far as China.

Pate, on the island of Pate on the northern end of the archipelago is another rich archaelogical and historical site. Two villages sit upon the area nowadays: Kitokwa and Mitaayu. Much of the history of Pate is described through the locally-written Pate Chronicle and the writings of Arab traders. Excavations by Neville Chittick in the 1960s suggested that Pate was not occupied before the 14th century. Pate was split into multiple mitaa, or wards, and was surrounded by a 60cm thick wall. Pate had many mosques in its history that served different neighborhoods. Among them were Bwana Bakari, Bwana Tamu, Salim, Mwenye Kombo, Pokomo, Nuru, and Ng'andu. Recently, the mosques of Bwana Bakari and Bwana Tamu have been restored. The many mosques are built of coral rag and rag mortar. The Mosques of Bwana Bakari and Bwana Tamu were built in the late 17th and early 18th century, both named after Sultans (Sultan Abubakar and Sultan Bwana Tamu respectively).The town's population is likely to have been around 10-11,000 at its peak, making it the largest town in the archipelago. (Lamu peaked around 7,000 inhabitants).

On the Northern end of Manda island lies the abandoned settlement of Manda, which is well preserved and dates back to the 9th-10th century. The ruins at Manda contain early halmarks of Swahili civilization, including architecture from coral rag, iron smelting, and trade with the Islamic world and further East. Beginning in the late 15th century, many Swahili East African trade communities were disrupted by Portuguese and Ottoman traders looking to secure control over trade routes, as well as rival peoples such as the Galla and Zimba. Siyu, a town located at the center of Manda Island, has less clear access to the Indian Ocean. This town, established as far back as the 13th century, was known for both its agricultural and manufacturing abilities relative to the other towns of the archipelago. The town reached a peak population of up to 30,000, and has evidence of significant cloth making, leather working, and woodworking industries. At Siyu, a stone fort was ordered to be constructed in the mid-1800s by the Omani-Zanzibari Sultanate that ruled the region.

== Mosques ==
For centuries, the Swahili coast of East Africa has been a cultural crossroads. The mosques, central to the religious life of the region, bear witness to this rich heritage. Their architecture reflects not only Islamic traditions but also the artistic influences of various trading partners. This is particularly evident in the design of the mihrab, the prayer niche of symbolic importance within a mosque.

The 18th and 19th centuries witnessed a period of significant change on the Swahili coast, particularly in the Lamu archipelago. The rise of Pate as a major political force, challenging Portuguese control of Mombasa, is thought to have been the catalyst for a distinct "new Swahili mihrab" style. This essay examines the development of this unique style, exploring its key features, the influences that shaped it, and prominent examples.

The period was marked by a surge in mosque construction, with 22 mosques built in Lamu town and 12 in Pate between 1750 and 1820. A new style of mihrab (prayer niche) was developed, characterised by two key elements: a pronounced use of stucco for decoration and the adoption of the trilobal arch.

The trilobal arch, a more elaborate design than the broken arch used previously, emerged in the 17th century under the influence of Indian traders. By the late 18th century this form had evolved into a polylobal design. The construction techniques for the mihrab arches involved ashlar blocks of coral bound with mortar, covered with a thick layer of stucco, and topped with pointed arches with a central boss.

At the center of the abandoned town of Takwa on Manda Island stands a mosque with a 6.7 meter tall stone pillar (dubbed the Mosque of the Pillar). The mosque, like the town, was likely built between the 15th and 17th centuries before being abandoned. It contains a north-facing Mihrab and hemispherical arches separating its rooms. Evidence of wooden pulpits were also found. The mosque is built of coral rag. Near the north end of the mosque is the namesake pillar. This a tomb as pillar tombs are a hallmark of Swahili culture. The pillar is visited twice a year by Muslims from the nearby town of Shela, who pray for rain.

Decoration played an important role in the new style. The tympanums, the recessed areas above the arch, continued the tradition of using inlaid ceramics as seen in Pate. However, there was a change in the material used for the central boss, from coral to stucco. The frame of the mihrab itself was decorated with stucco panels with geometric designs. The interior of the mihrab apse was decorated with triangular plaster mouldings, while the semi-dome vault had a fluted surface.

Examples of this style include a Lamu mihrab with an inscription dated 1753, and mihrabs at Simambaya and Utondwe (Tanzania) dated 1796 and 1782 respectively. Interestingly, Omani mosques built during this period showed a strong resemblance to the Swahili models, with bays parallel to the qibla wall and a projecting mihrab. The Omani Simambaya Mosque, built between 1725 and 1765, is an example of this similarity.

A later example, the Swahili Wa Deule mosque at Shela (Lamu), built in 1848 according to an inscription in the mihrab, demonstrates the continued use of the trilobal arch. This particular mihrab was framed by semicircular mouldings and decorated with panels of floral and geometric motifs.

The influence of external factors is also evident in this architectural development. The flowering of this new style finds parallels in Yemeni mosques, particularly in Surat, where mihrabs with finely carved trilobal arches suggest a growing economic relationship with India. The Ndia Kuu Mosque in Mombasa, excavated in 1985, reinforces this external influence. This 17th century mosque, probably used by Indian and Pakistani mercenaries, had a square plan, a small mihrab decorated with Indian-style volutes and blind arcades, and two small pillars flanking the mihrab projection.

The Ribat al-Riyadha Mosque, founded in 1901, was founded by Sufi mystic and scholar Habib Swaleh. Inspired by fellow Hadrami scholar Habib Ali al-Habshi, Habib Swaleh endorsed musical and singing practices in mosques as well as dancing as a religious activity. The mosque began hosting celebrations of Maulid in 1909. The popularity of the celebration at the mosque has since increased, attracting pilgrims from the broader Swahili Coast. The Maulidi Festival at Lamu is a week-long festival that involves singing, dancing, and celebration that attracts pilgrims from around the Swahili Coast.

== Gallery ==
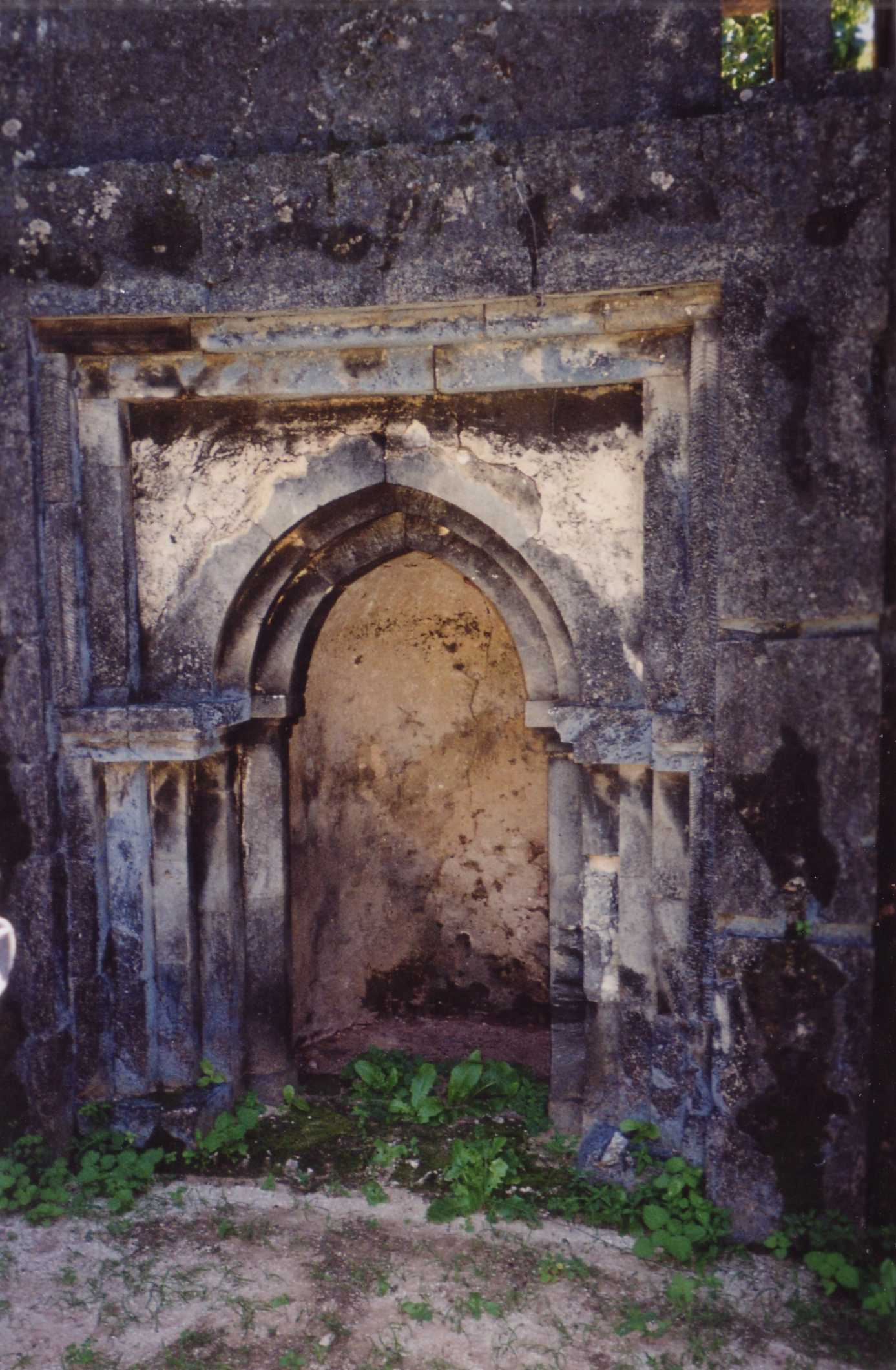
The 16th century Takwa Ruins on Manda Island

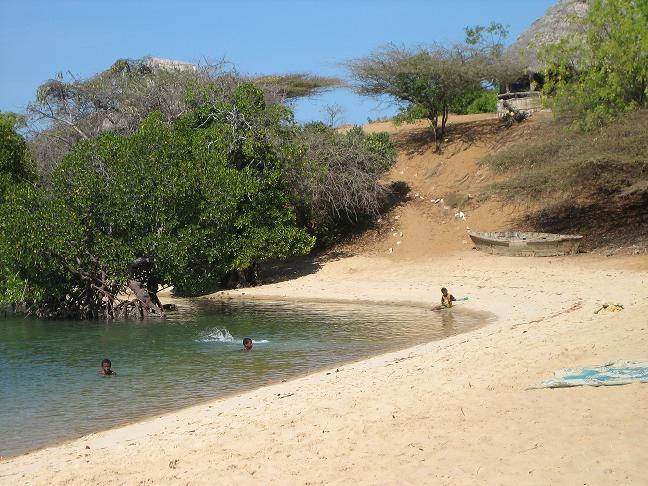
The west side of Kiwayuu Island

== Bibliography ==
- Allen, James de Vere: Lamu, with an appendix on Archaeological finds from the region of Lamu by H. Neville Chittick. Nairobi: Kenya National Museums.
- Eliot, Charles (1966). The East African Protectorate. Routledge. ISBN 0-7146-1661-3.
- Engel, Ulf; Ramos, Manuel João (17 May 2013). African Dynamics in a Multipolar World. BRILL. ISBN 978-90-04-25650-7.
- Martin, Chryssee MacCasler Perry; Martin, Esmond Bradley: "Quest for the Past: An Historical Guide to the Lamu Archipelago" Marketing and Publishing Ltd., 1973.
