= Fingə =

- Location within Azerbaijan Location within East Zangezur Economic Region
- Coordinates: 39°45′40″N 46°32′35″E
- Country: Azerbaijan
- District: Lachin
- Time zone: UTC+4 (AZT)
  - Summer (DST): UTC+5 (AZT)

Fingə (Finga) is a village in the Lachin District of Azerbaijan.
