= Mbweni, Zanzibar =

Town on the Tanzanian island of Unguja, the main island of Zanzibar

Coordinates: 6°13′10″S 39°12′30″E

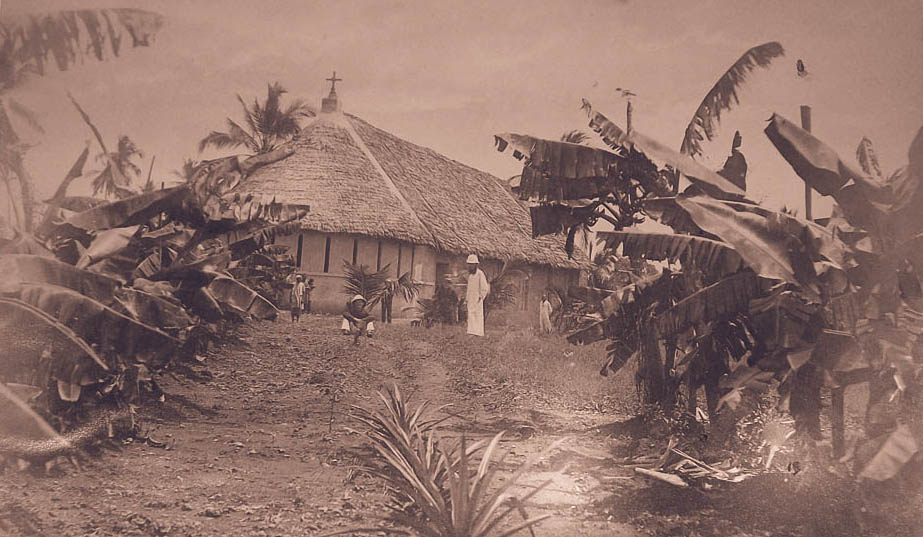
St John's Church, freed slave estate, Mbweni, Zanzibar (c. 1880).

Mbweni is a settlement located in Mjini Magharibi Region of the Tanzanian island of Unguja, the main island of Zanzibar. It is located on the central west coast, seven kilometres south of the Zanzibari capital of Stone Town.

The town is a popular day-trip destination for both tourists and locals. Mbweni's attractions include botanical gardens and the ruins of a nineteenth-century Christian mission.

== See also ==
- List of Swahili settlements of the East African coast
