= Chake Chake District =

District of Pemba South Region, Tanzania

Chake Chake
- District
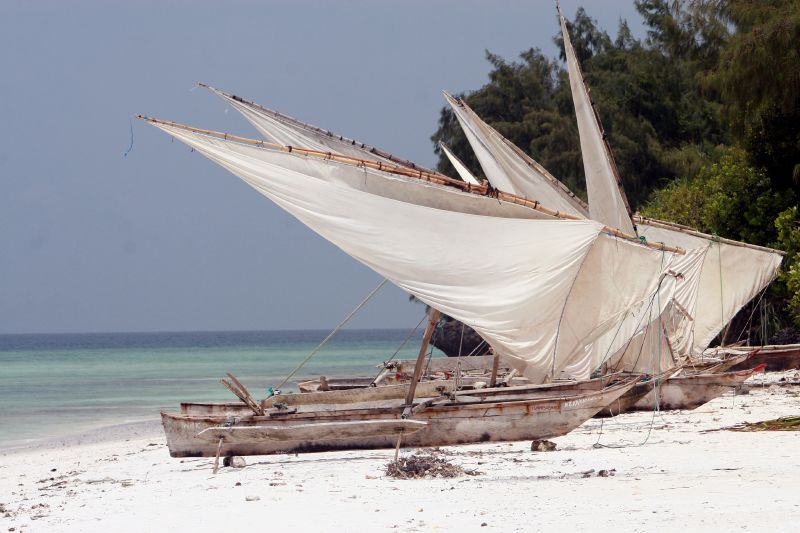
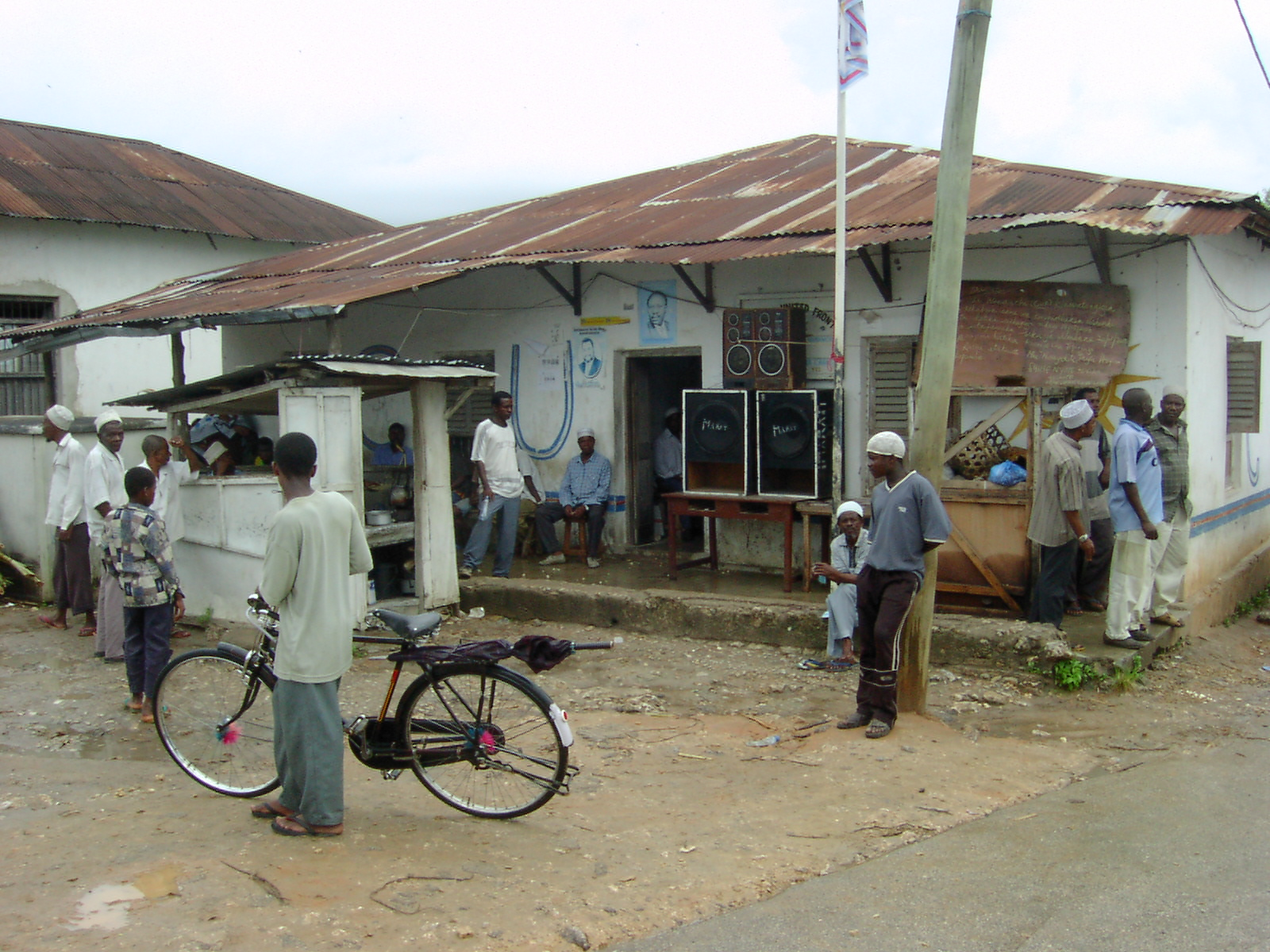
- From top to bottom: Dhows on the western shore of the district & Small office building in Chake-Chake town

- Location in Pemba South
- Coordinates: 5°14′42.72″S 39°47′46.32″E
- Country: Tanzania
- Region: Pemba South Region
- Named for: Town of Chake-Chake
- Capital: Chake-Chake

Area
  - Total: 219 km^{2} (85 sq mi)
  - Rank: 2nd in Pemba South

Population (2022)
  - Total: 136,298
  - Rank: 2nd in Pemba South
  - Density: 622/km^{2} (1,610/sq mi)
- Demonym: Chakechaken

Ethnic groups
  - Settler: Swahili
  - Native: Hadimu

Chake Chake District (Swahili: Wilaya ya Chake Chake) is one of two administrative districts of Pemba South Region in Tanzania. The district covers an area of 219 km^{2} (85 sq mi). The district is comparable in size to the land area of American Samoa. The district has a water border to the east and west by the Indian Ocean. The district is bordered to the south by Mkoani District and the north by Wete District of Pemba North Region. The district seat (capital) is the town of Chake-Chake. According to the 2022 census, the district has a total population of 136,298.

== Administrative subdivisions ==
As of 2012, Chake Chake District was administratively divided into 31 wards.

=== Wards ===
1. Chachani
2. Chanjaani
3. Chonga
4. Dodo
5. Kibokoni
6. Kichungwani
7. Kilindi
8. Kwale
9. Madungu
10. Matale

1. Mbuzini
2. Mfikiwa
3. Mgelema
4. Mgogoni
5. Michungwani
6. Mkoroshoni
7. Msingini
8. Mvumoni
9. Ndagoni
10. Ng'ambwa

1. Pujini
2. Shungi
3. Tibirinzi
4. Uwandani
5. Vitongoji
6. Wara
7. Wawi
8. Wesha
9. Ziwani
