= Kaole =

National Historic Site of Tanzania

Kaole Ruins
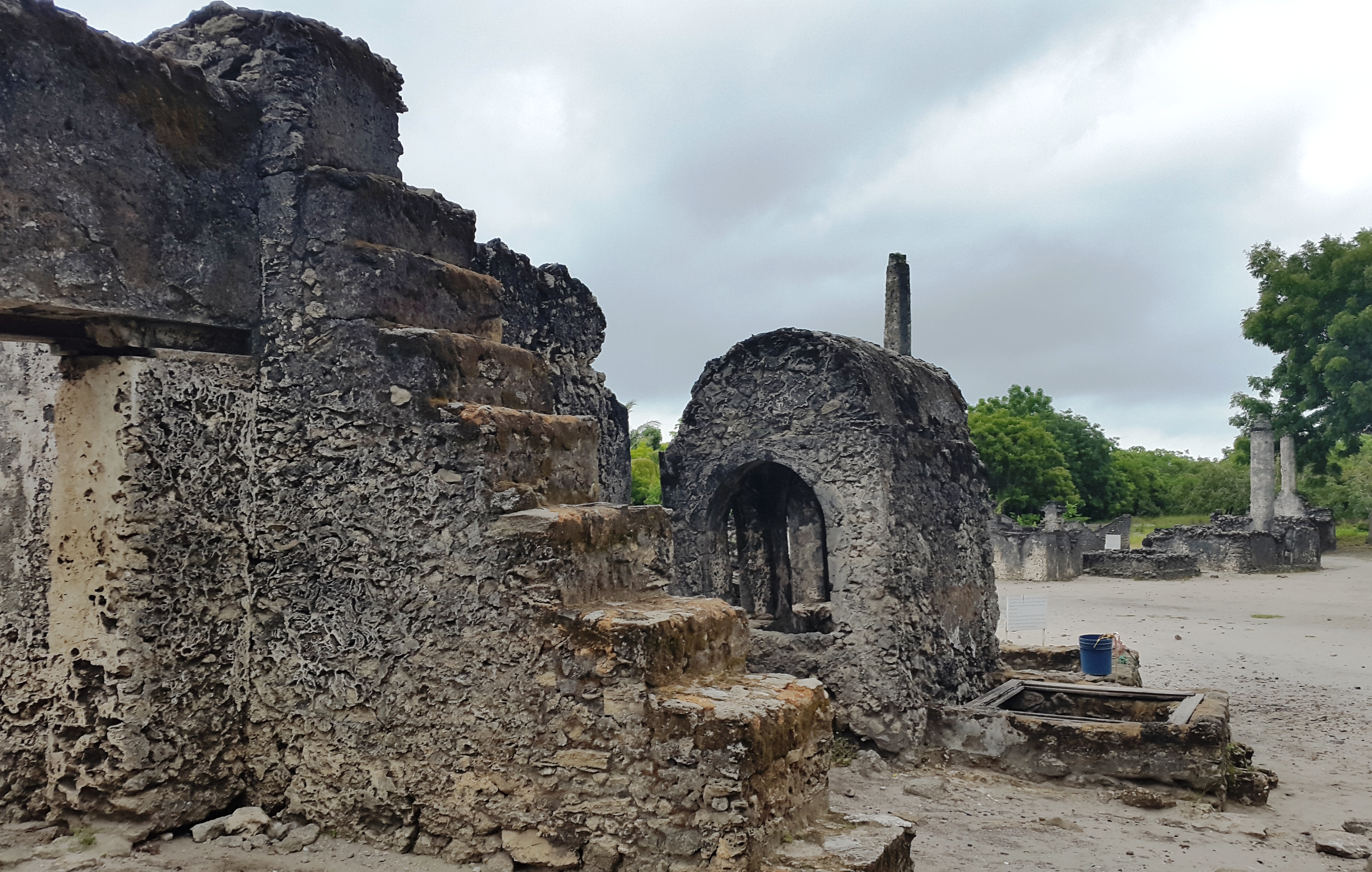
- Kaole Ruins in Bagamoyo District

- Location within Tanzania
- 6.4634°S 38.9468°E
- Type: Settlement
- Cultures: Swahili
- Location: Bagamoyo District, Pwani Region, Tanzania

History
- Built: 13th century

Site notes
- Material: Coral rag
- Architectural style: Swahili
- Excavation dates: 1958
- Archaeologists: Neville Chittick
- Condition: Endangered
- Owner: Tanzanian Government
- Management: Antiquities Division, Ministry of Natural Resources and Tourism

National Historic Sites of Tanzania
- Official name: Kaole Ruins Historic Site
- Type: Cultural

Kaole is a national historic site located in Bagamoyo District of Pwani Region in Tanzania. The site is located 5 kilometres east of the historic city of Bagamoyo on the Indian Ocean coast. The area contains old Swahili coral stone ruins dating to a period between the 13th century and the 16th century. Some of the ruins date back to the 13th century and consist of two mosques and 30 tombs.

The tombs at Kaole were built from coral stones with stone pillars that marked some of the tombs. According to local tradition, some of the tombs are the graves of local rulers who were known as "Diwanis". "Diwanis" are believed to be the descendants of the Sheikh Ali Muhamad al-Hatim al-Barawi. A small museum has been established, where some artifacts are exposed that were found in the ruins. Some of these artifacts are Chinese and thus provide evidence of ancient commercial relationships.

== History ==
Kaole was originally settled in the 8th century as a trading town. Mangrove poles, sandalwood, ebony and ivory would have been the main trading items. The dwellings of the Kaole people were mostly constructed of wood, making them less durable than the stone mosques and tombs. Later on, the Zaramo people in the area called the place Kaole, meaning "go and see". The first to study the Kaole Ruins was the British archaeologist Neville Chittick, around 1958.

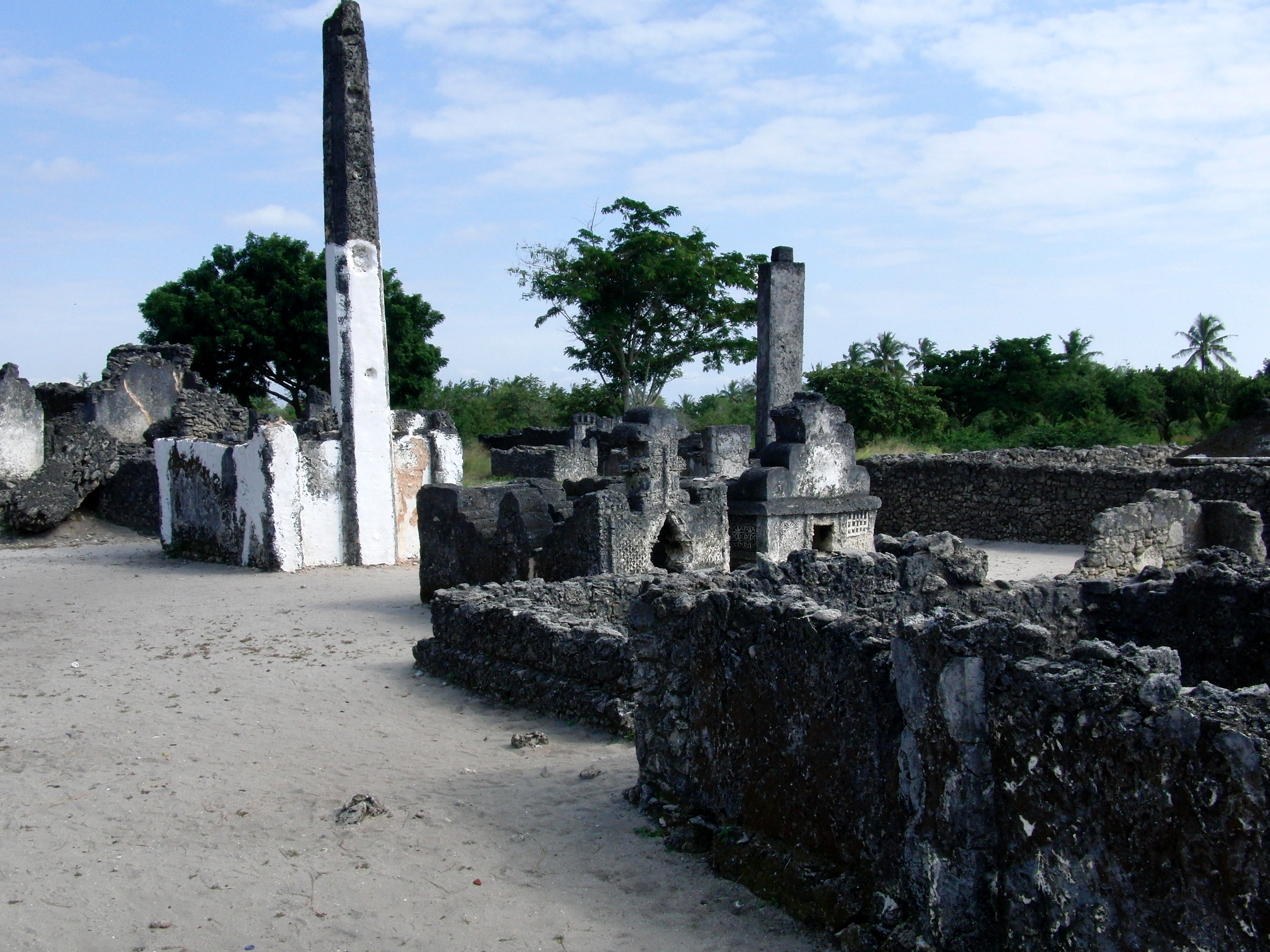
Pillar tomb

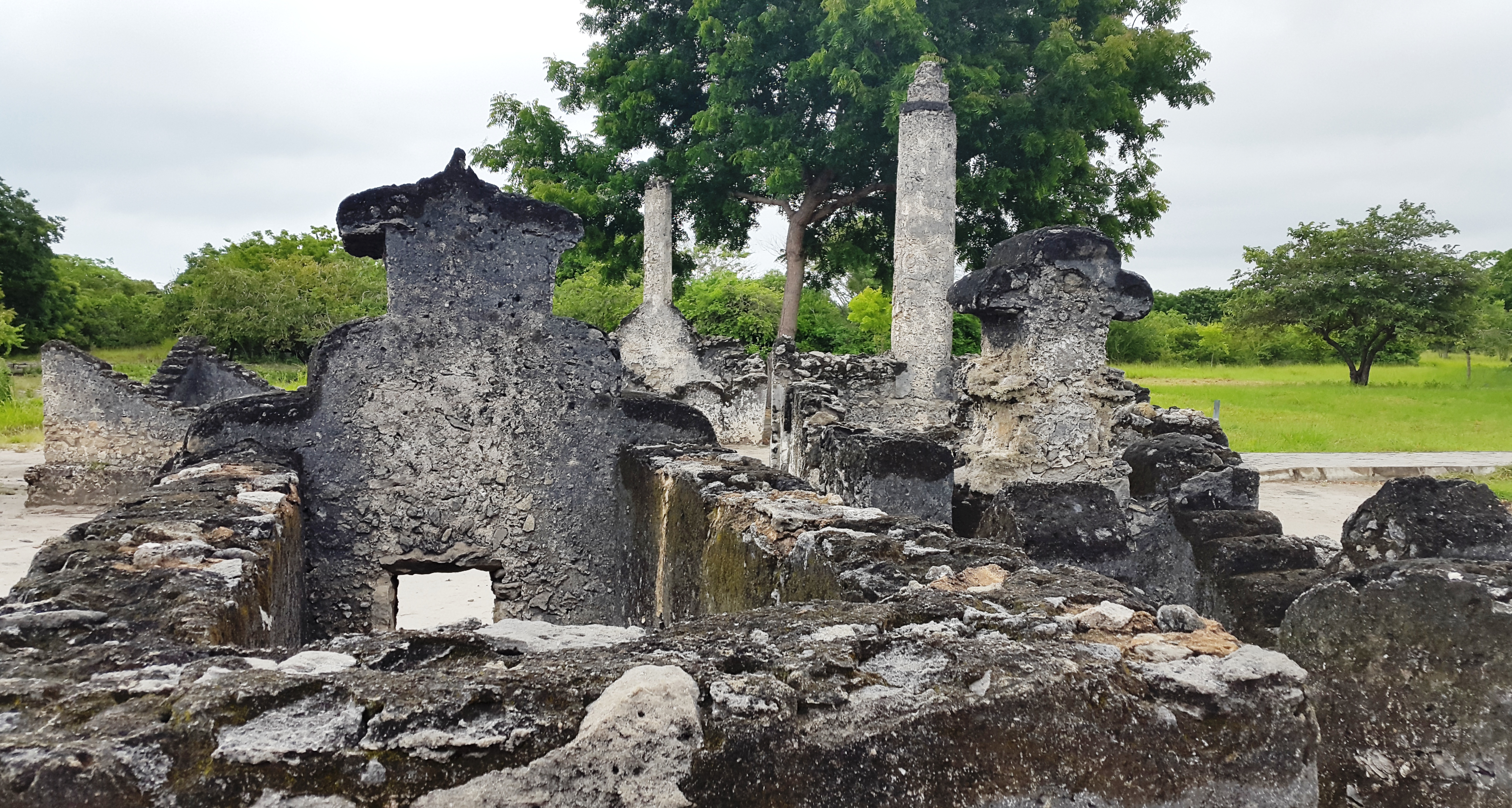
Kaole graves

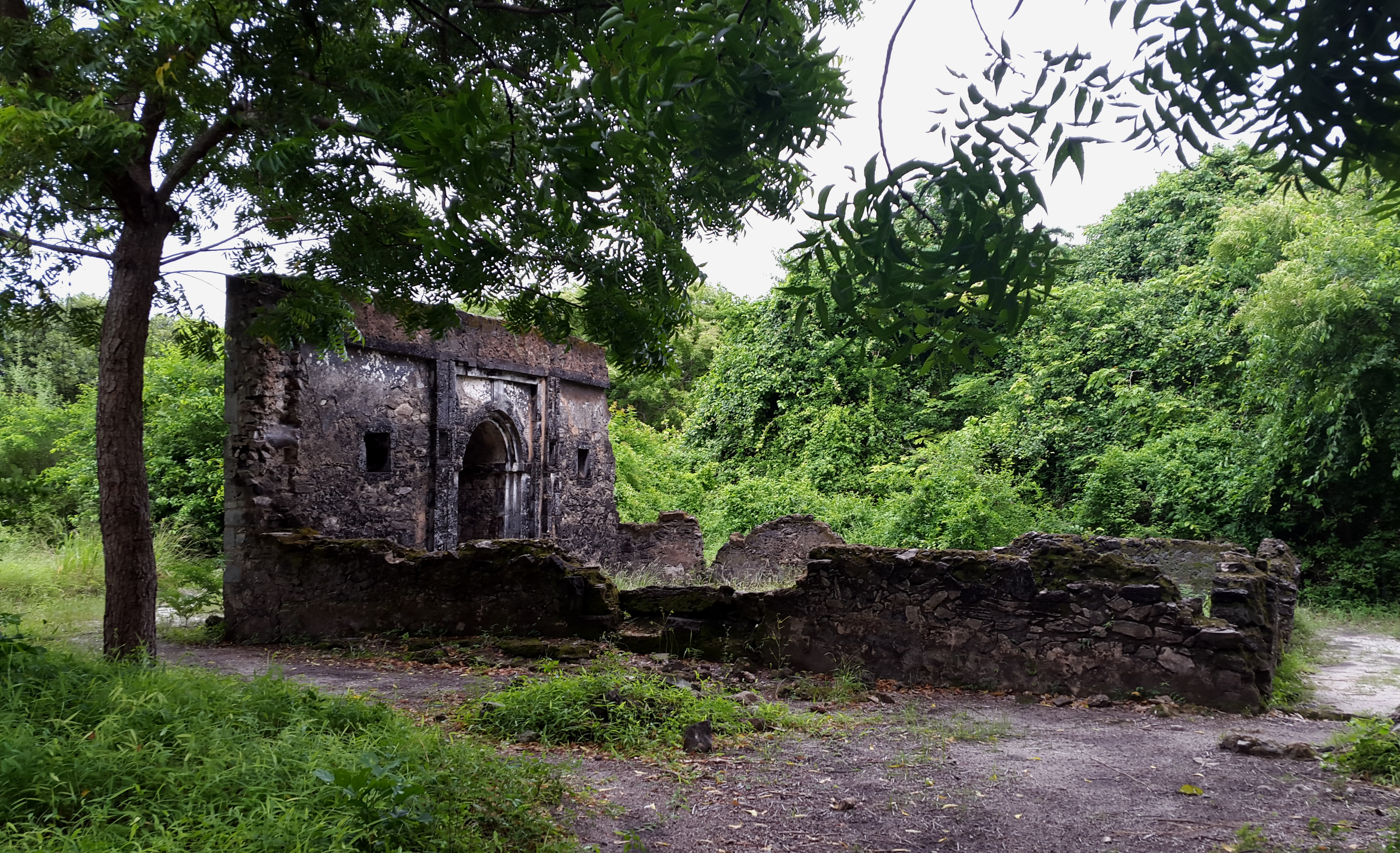
Kaole Mosque

== See also ==
- Historic Swahili Settlements
- Kunduchi Ruins
- Tongoni Ruins
- Kimbiji Ruins
- Msuka Mjini Ruins
- Kichokochwe Ruins
- Pujini Ruins
- Balochi Kaole
