= Tongoni Ruins =

National Historic Site of Tanzania

Tongoni
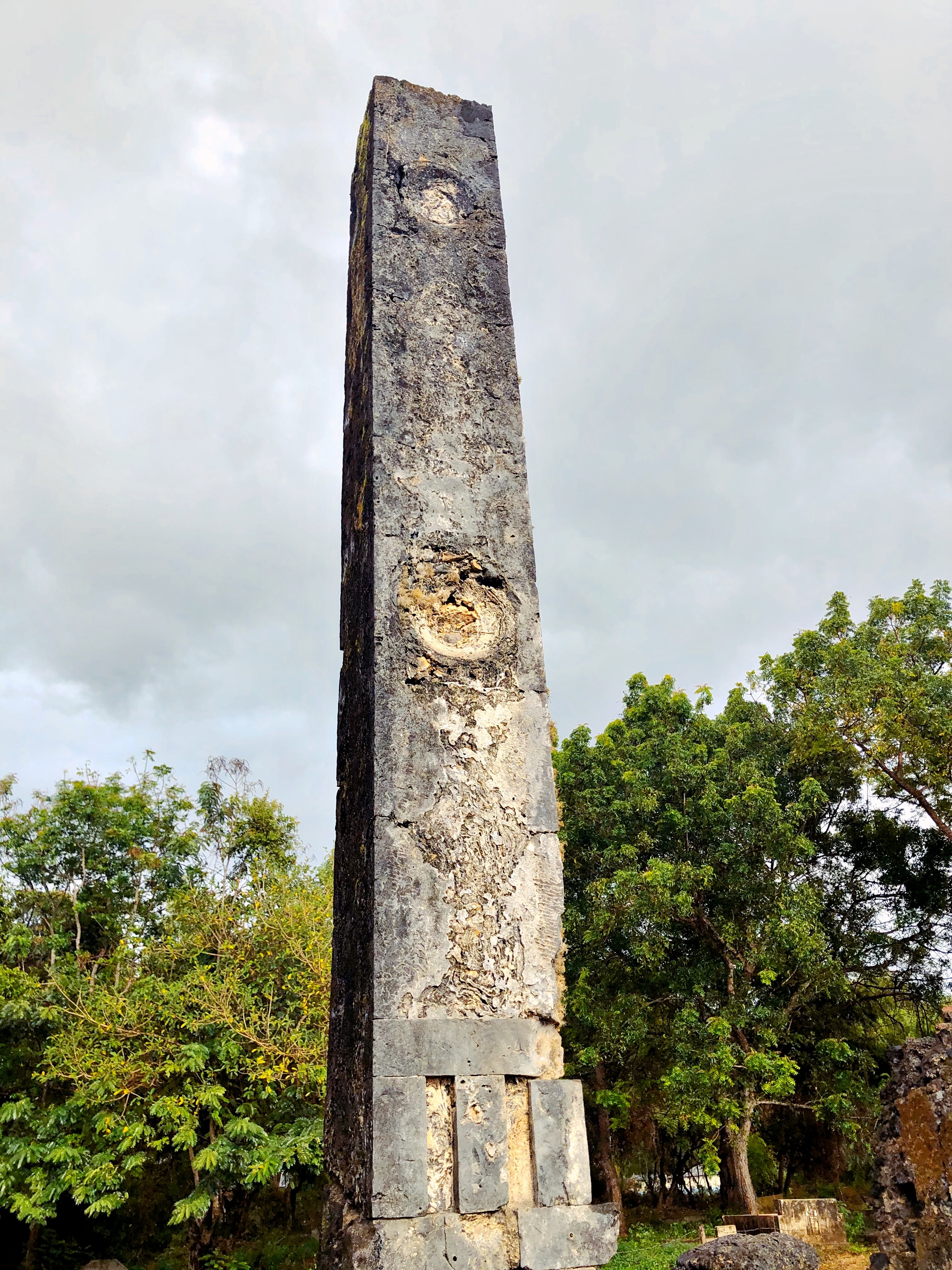
- Pillar tomb at Tongoni

- Location within Tanzania
- 5.21581256°S 39.0638125°E
- Type: Settlement
- Cultures: Swahili
- Location: Tanzania, Tanga Region, Pangani District, Tongoni ward,

History
- Built: 14th century CE
- Abandoned: 17th century CE

Site notes
- Material: Coral rag
- Architectural styles: Swahili & Islamic
- Excavation dates: 1981
- Archaeologists: Richard Gramly
- Condition: Protected
- Owner: Tanzanian Government
- Management: Antiquities Division under the Ministry of Natural Resources and Tourism

National Historic Sites of Tanzania
- Official name: Tongoni Historic Site
- Type: Cultural

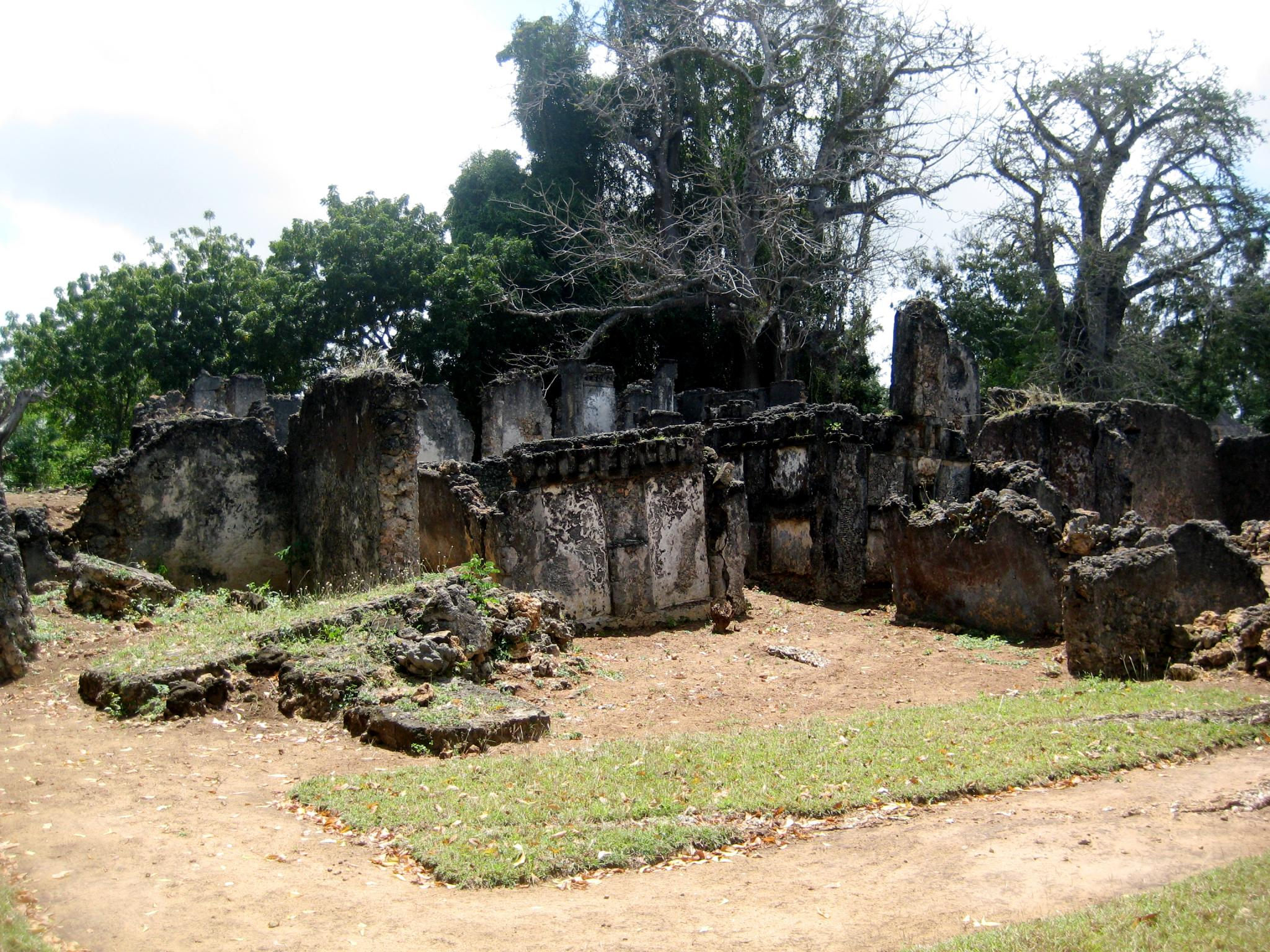
Tongoni Ruins

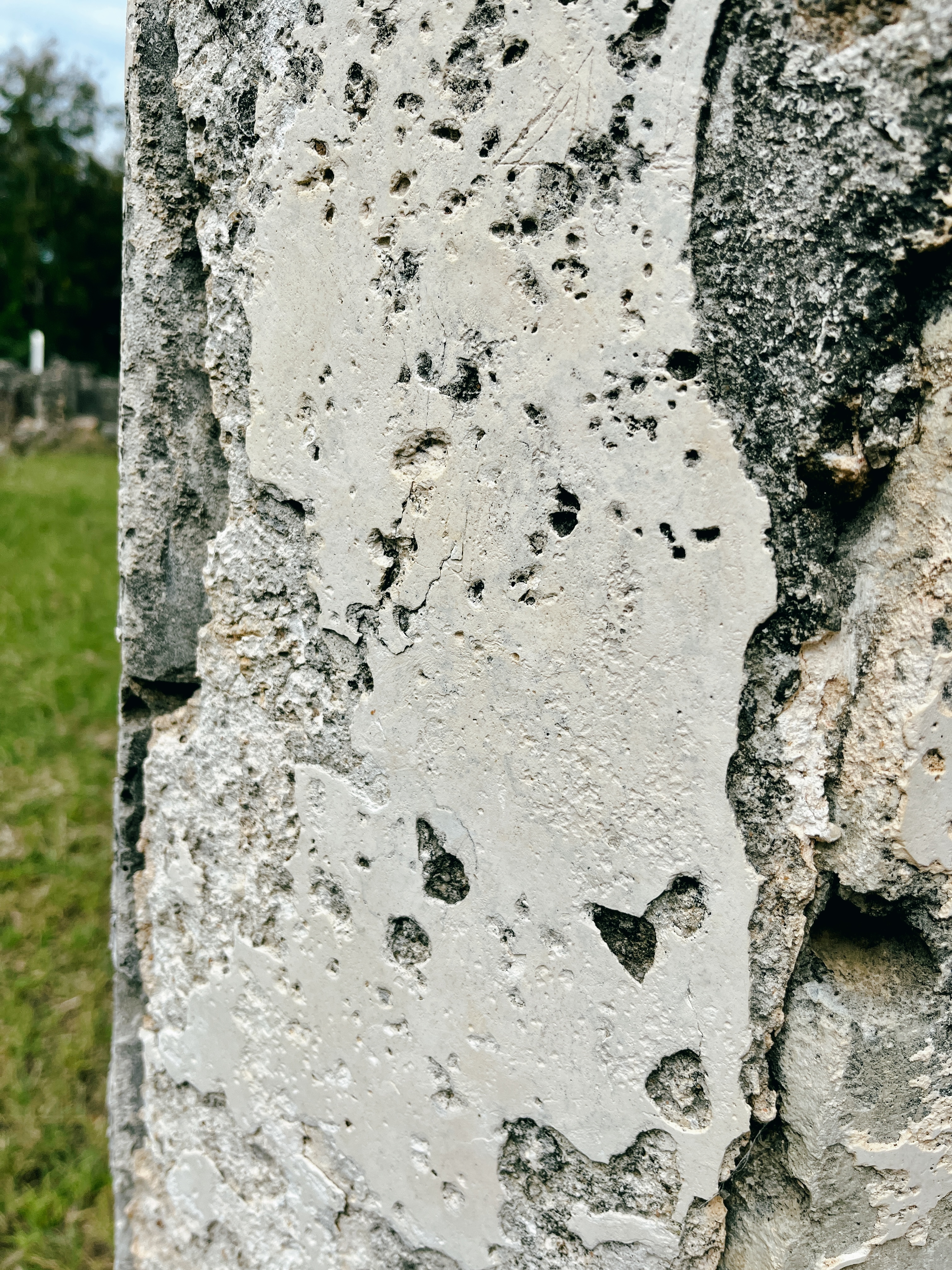
Coral plaster detail, Tongoni ruins

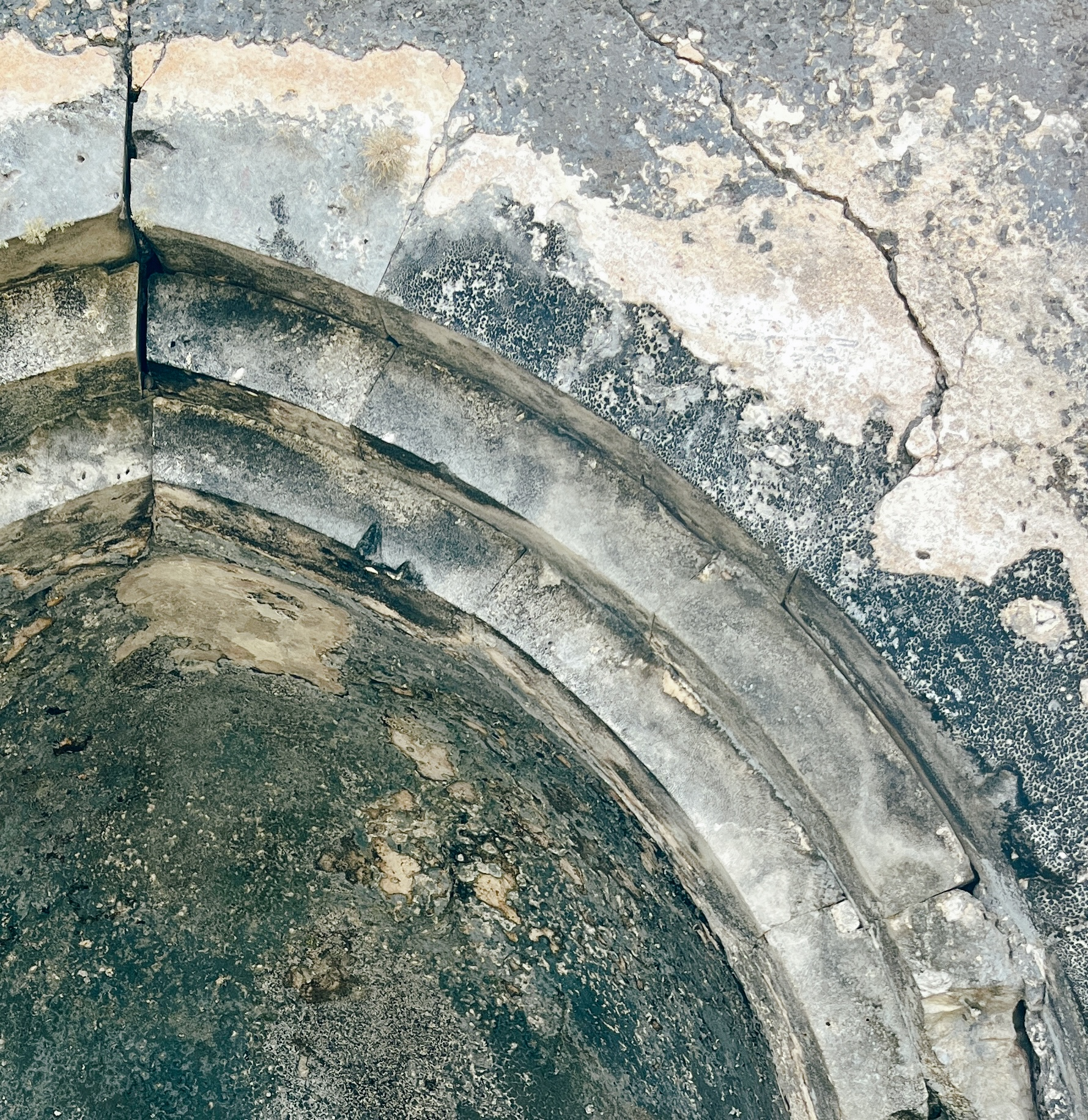
Coral Work detail

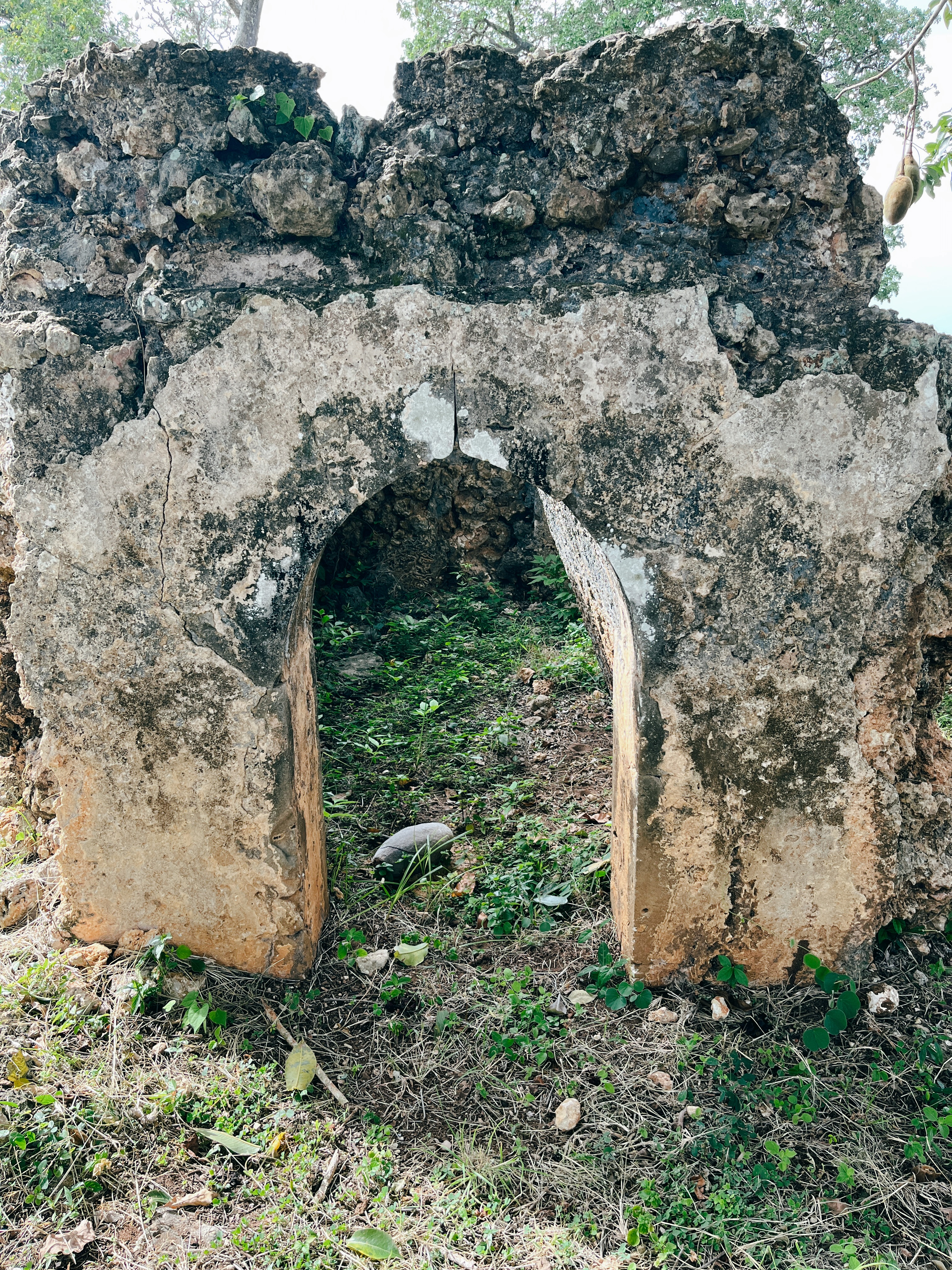
Details 3 Tongoni.

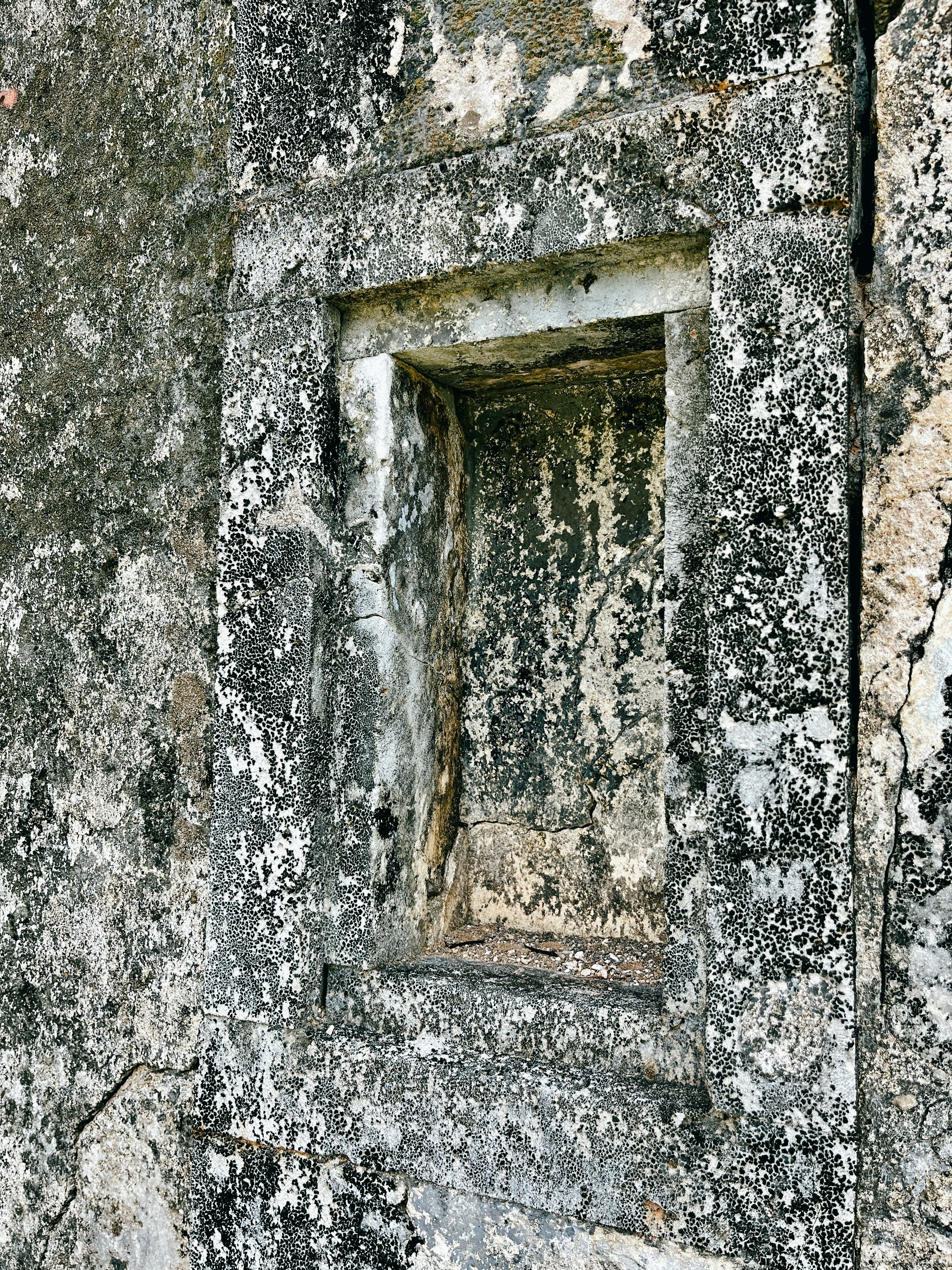
Tongoni ruins detail

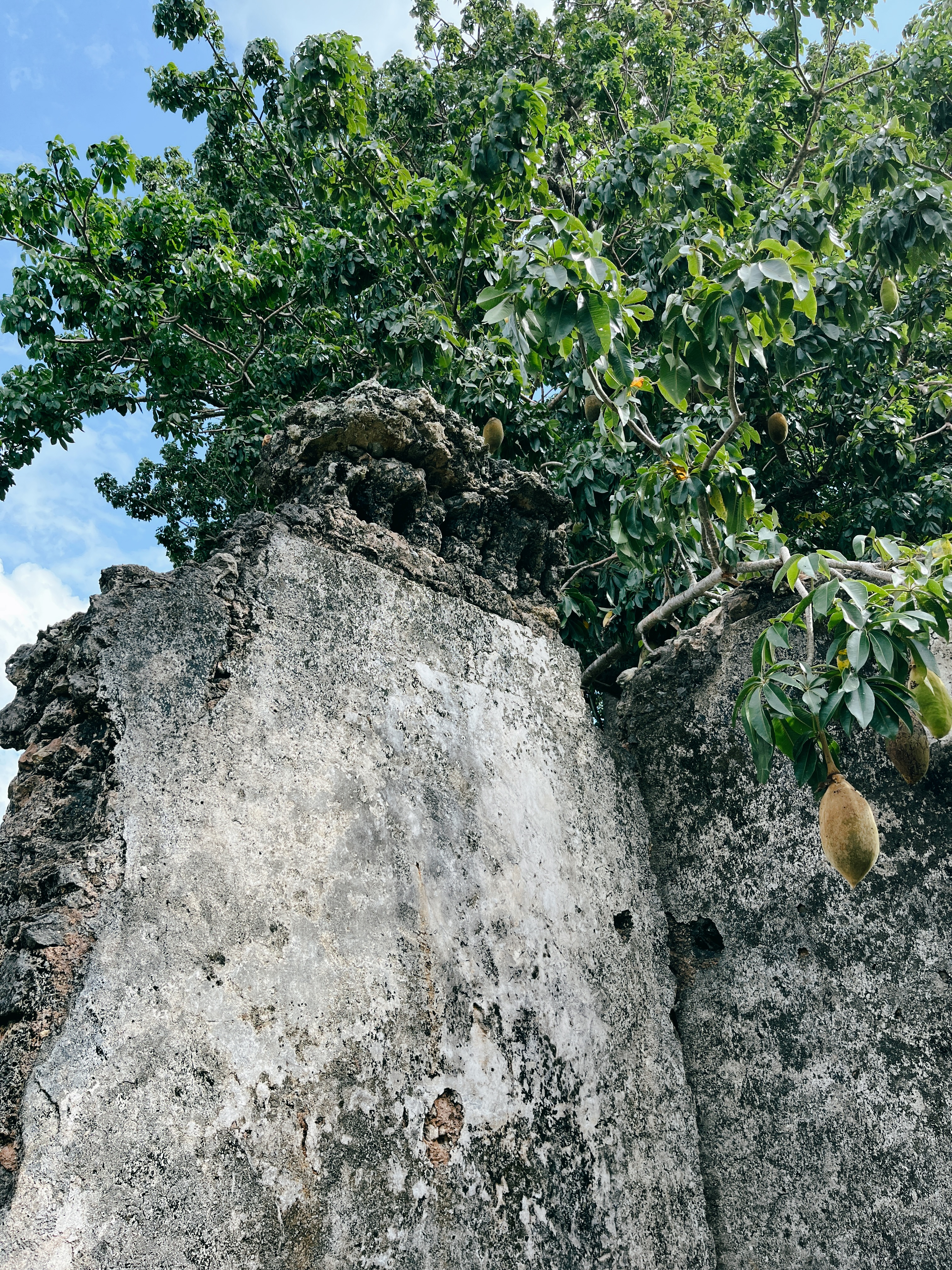
Details Tongoni

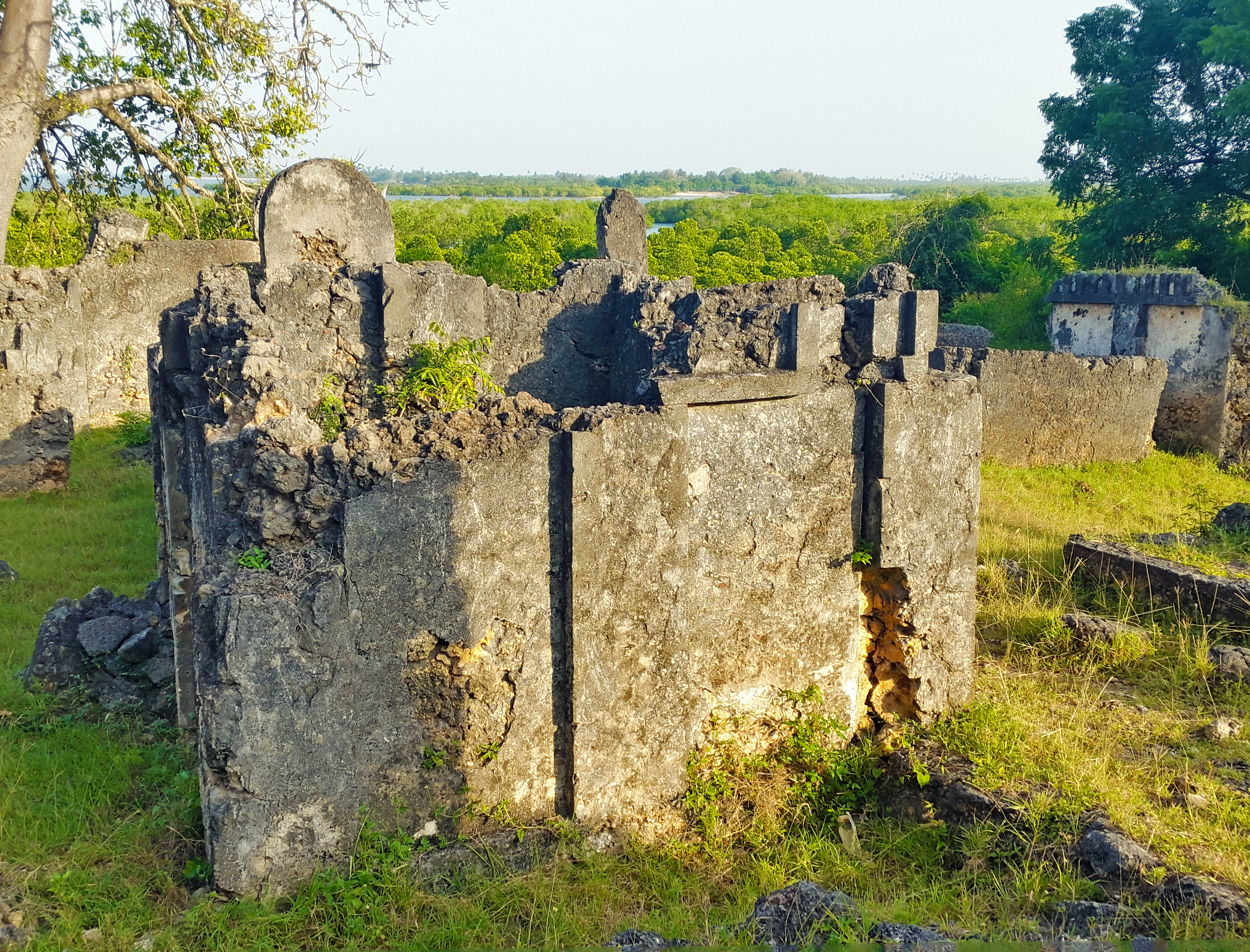
Tongoni ruins distance

The Tongoni Ruins (Magofu ya kale ya Tongoni in Swahili) are a 15th-century Swahili ruins of a mosque and forty tombs located in Tongoni ward in Tanga District inside Tanga Region of Tanzania. The largest and possibly most significant Swahili site in Tanzania is Tongoni, which is located 25 km north of the Pangani River. Overlooking Mtangata Bay, about forty standing tombs and a Friday mosque of the "northern" style occupy a third of a hectare. People from the area continue to worship there spiritually. They bury their departed family members to the south of the historic tombs. The area was a different place four to five centuries ago. Contrary to its almost unnoticed presence today, it was a prosperous and a respected Swahili trading centre during the 15th century. Most of the ruins are still not yet been uncovered. The site is a registered National Historic Site.

== Site ==
More over 40 miles to the north of Muhembo is Kilole Bay where Tongoni Ruins are located on a low embankment along the southwest side of the Bay. The bay is protected by peninsulas from brisk monsoon winds. The foreshore of the location is covered in mangroves. Tongoni, the village of Mtangata, and its about 3,500 inhabitants, most of whom are cassava and coconut farmers and fishermen, are surrounded by scattered trees (baobabs, tamarinds, and palms). Along the bay, sandy soils predominate, particularly at Vumbani in the southeast of Mtangata. The littoral is characterised by a limestone basement covered by loams and clay loams.

On a Pleistocene terrace that overlooks Mtangata and the ocean vastness to the east, residents of the wider countryside, including those who self-identify as Zigua, Digo, and Nyamwezi (the latter being recent migrants), produce maize and vegetables and gather firewood. This shoreline is dotted with fresh water wells, some of which have recently become salty. In close proximity to the north is the settlement of Sadani.

== Archaeological findings ==
Important discoveries were made in shovel test pits. The researchers found numerous artefacts to the north, south, and west of the old mosque. Typical Swahili ornamentation, such as punctures or stamps of dots along or below vessel necks, can be seen on local vessels. We discovered a clay pipe bowl and a sherd with affinities to later TIW (post-900 C.E.) in other STPs. Group D is a form of pottery with raised dots that is known from the East Usambara Mountains and dates to the middle to late second millennium C.E.

Additionally, one STP located west of the mosque produced a piece of gneiss grindstone, a raw material found only nearby mountains. Between Mtangata and Vumbani, the site surface is covered in dozens of beads and a few coins from the late eighteenth century. At Vumbani, a subsurface test turned up bits of Indian ceramics, Chinese celadon, blue-green Islamic monochrome, and coiled and drawn glass beads.

Researchers have documented about 7,000 locally produced ceramics in Tongoni, 10.7% of which are diagnoses. The entire assembly is best exemplified by Unit 3, Subunit 5 of the site. There are 328 diagnostics altogether, including 4 undecorated bases, 98 decorated body sherds, 115 adorned rims, and 112 undecorated rims. Local ceramics typically have a surface colour that ranges from brown to black (although there are a few orange instances). Cores are grittier and typically dark (brown, black, or grey). Ceramic materials contain 2-4% quartz temper.

Additionally, the group gathered beads and foreign ceramics. The latter make up about 1.2% (n = 80) of the sherds that were excavated. There are several different sorts at the location, the majority of which being blue-green Islamic monochromes or other Middle Eastern variants. Chinese celadons and blue-and-white are also widely used. The fourteenth to seventeenth centuries are when these pottery varieties were produced. Additionally, the higher strata contains a small number of European pottery from the late 18th to early 19th century.

One unusual stone of unknown material, two smoothed sharpening stones, a group of coral fragments partially encircling an ash pit, huge local sherds (many decorated), one blue glass bead, one faceted carnelian tube bead, and an oyster nut seed are among the special discoveries. The scientists also discovered a little engraving of a human face on the jaw of a parrotfish (Family Scaridae) and a bone hairpin. An ash lens, several big shells, including conchs, a gneiss grinding stone, a grinding/sharpening stone with an unknown red stain, a sizable piece of slag, a cow vertebra, six glass beads, one ivory bead, and two oyster nut seeds. Collectively, the people of Mtangata came to the conclusion that such discoveries were the home of a healer or other revered community members. The carved face, the faceted carnelian bead that Zigua healers have worn in the past, and the oyster nut seeds all have intriguing meanings.

Together, these artefacts show that Tongoni was inhabited from the late fourteenth/early fifteenth century until the seventeenth century. This timeline is supported by the mosque type and the Chittick (1959) account. Even though this collection only represents a small portion of an excavation, differences in the character and abundance of various vessel forms, fish and non-fish bones, shellfish, and particular artefact types show that Tongoni has changed over time. For the majority of the time that Tongoni was inhabited, people lived in wattle-and-daub houses to the west and northwest of the main coral ruins.

== History ==
Tongoni was established around the tenth century by Swahili residents as part of the Swahili city states dotted along the East African coast.

The Swahili period (1250–1550 C.E.) saw connections between regional groups and societies in the Indian Ocean, however they were only moderately intense. Thus, the "Golden Age" of the Swahili (1250/1350-1550 C.E., but especially the earlier centuries within this range) influenced littoral settlers in northeastern Tanzania, although not nearly to the extent felt at Kilwa on the southern Swahili coast (where the gold trade flourished 1200-1350 C.E.) or at Mombasa and Malindi in Kenya.

Late in this era, Tongoni and Swahili villages on Tanga Island (in the harbour of Tanga Town) also began to grow into prominent towns. Mombasa in particular developed into a significant power. Tongoni may have had the chance to escape Mombasa, its northern neighbour, for a while by an eventual alliance with foreign invaders, the Portuguese. Vasco da Gama, the Portuguese sailor, first visited Tongoni in April 1498. He had the opportunity to eat the local oranges, which he said were better than those available in Portugal. He made a second visit the following year, and spent fifteen days in Tongoni.

Foreign objects were discovered during inspections and excavations in low-lying Swahili sites like Tongoni along the Pangani River region, including glass beads and early Middle Eastern pottery like hatched sgraffiato. These early TIW artefacts and specimens indicate that Swahili sites in the region developed somewhere in the first millennium C.E., most likely by 1250 C.E. Investigations have shown that the sites upriver (such Kumbamtoni, Site 52a) were really created before Muhembo (Site 37 in Survey Unit 4) and Tongoni. The majority of the commodities that the villagers along the river produced were used locally. The majority (80%, n = 44 of 55) of the beads at Kumbamtoni (Site 52a) are fashioned of marine mollusk shell, not glass, in contrast to Muhembo and Tongoni. Ceramic and stone bead grinders are more common along the river than at Muhembo and Tongoni, where they are much less common. Swahili bowls were also decorated by riverine inhabitants using graphite from the Usambara Mountains (e.g., Kumbamtoni, Site 52a, Excavation Unit 2).

The situation along the Swahili coast changed after 1550 C.E. Unlike Mombasa, the majority of coastal communities in the western Indian Ocean experienced a decline in population, influence, or even total collapse. By 1600 CE and 1850 CE, respectively, ceramics from the Post-Swahili and Post-Post-Swahili periods were widely used in settlements. The earliest of these times at Pangani were characterised by diffuse habitation. Sites found during the survey with only Post-Swahili content are noticeably smaller than those from previous Swahili times. Instead, findings from sites with mostly Swahili artefacts only make up a small portion of Post-Swahili remains.

Larger communities like Muhembo attracted coastal residents after 1550 C.E. This explanation explains why shellfish intake declined at sites near the Pangani River, such as Kumbamtoni and Site 52a, but increased at bigger sites with massive remains, such as Muhembo, along with a consequent decline in species variety. The increase in shellfish consumption at big sites was especially noticeable outside of coral structures (Muhembo, excavation units 1 and 2; Tongoni, excavation units 2 and 3). Shellfish is forbidden for orthodox Muslims. Therefore, patterns in shellfish consumption over the past 750 years reveal that many non-Muslim Africans who were living in the countryside between 1250 and 1550 C.E. eventually moved to less-monumental areas of larger locations during the Post-Swahili era.

The Tongoni community made an effort to adapt to the fast changes that occurred on the coast starting in 1500 C.E., including climate changes during the "Little Ice Age" (1500–1750), Portuguese incursions, and fights for resources and power in the hinterland. Unique artefacts and higher shellfish consumption in the area suggest that locals tried to change their way of life and develop coping mechanisms (e.g., Tongoni, Excavation Unit 3, levels 5–7). Examples of hinterland ceramics from this time period can be found at sites along the coast, including Group D (at Tongoni, Excavation Unit 2) and a rouletted tradition that is probably from western Tanzania. These and other tangible hints point to increased contact between groups and along the shore.

The hypothesis that findings from Excavation Unit 3 (at Tongoni) indicate the home of a healer is supported by faceted carnelian beads, a face carving, oyster nut seeds, complete conch shells, and other unusual finds, such as a stone used for slaughtering (with a red stain). Kweme seeds have hinterland and riverine associations, which point to geographic ties in many coastwise healing traditions. Sites further inland along the shore also show signs of healing traditions. Such customs are influenced by both Indian Ocean and Mainland African cultures. Although some aspects of healing along the coast may date back thousands of years, it's likely that the tensions that emerged after 1550 C.E. boosted the importance of healing and divination.

The nineteenth century saw an increase in the worldwide traffic in slaves and ivory as well as the influence of Omani (and European) plantation agriculture, which amplified the pressures from earlier eras. People fled to hamlets outside from Pangani Town, the occupied administrative centre during the colonial period. The abundance of new glass bead varieties and the abundance of pottery from India, China, and Europe are artefacts at Gombero that show greater foreign engagement. Villagers in Gombero and other locations along Tanzania's northeastern coast (such as Tongoni, Excavation Unit 3 and Mtakani, Site 51a, Excavation Unit 1) frequently ate mud whelks during the last few centuries, possibly as a result of diminishing food supplies (and a growing population). As an alternative, plantation enslavement might have hindered local food production and/or reduced available options (such as hunting).

Villagers used carinated bowls (dependent, constrained vessels) to prepare their rice and veggies. Swahili-speaking patricians working in these circumstances were influenced by changes in the culture and economy to further set themselves apart from hinterland "pagans" (non-Muslims), in part by exaggerating tales about foreign origins.

== Historic Site Management ==
The ruins at Tongoni are under the Tanzanian Antiquities department of the Ministry of Natural Resources and Tourism. The ruins are open to the public but there have been no Phase III excavations. Decades ago, a small test excavation was conducted at the site and a site plan was drawn.

== See also ==
- Historic Swahili Settlements
- Kaole
- Pujini Ruins
- Msuka Mjini Ruins
- Kimbiji Ruins
- Kunduchi Ruins
- Swahili architecture
- National Historic Sites in Tanzania
