= Kichokochwe Ruins =

National Historic Site of Tanzania

- Location within Tanzania
- 5°7′0.12″S 39°49′59.88″E
- Type: Settlement
- Cultures: Swahili
- Location: Wete District, Pemba North Region, Tanzania

History
- Built: 17th century CE
- Abandoned: 20th century CE

Site notes
- Material: Coral rag
- Architectural styles: Swahili & Islamic
- Condition: Endangered
- Owner: Tanzanian Government
- Management: Antiquities Division, Ministry of Natural Resources and Tourism

National Historic Sites of Tanzania
- Official name: Kichokochwe Ruins Historic Site
- Type: Cultural

Kichokochwe (Swahili Magofu ya mji wa Kale wa Kichokochwe) is protected historic site located inside Wete District of Pemba North Region in Tanzania. The site is home to partially excavated abandoned late medieval Swahili ruins, with a mosque and tombs.

== See also ==
- Kunduchi Ruins
- Kimbiji Ruins
- Tongoni Ruins
- Pujini Ruins
- Msuka Mjini Ruins
