= Kunduchi Ruins =

National Historic Site of Tanzania

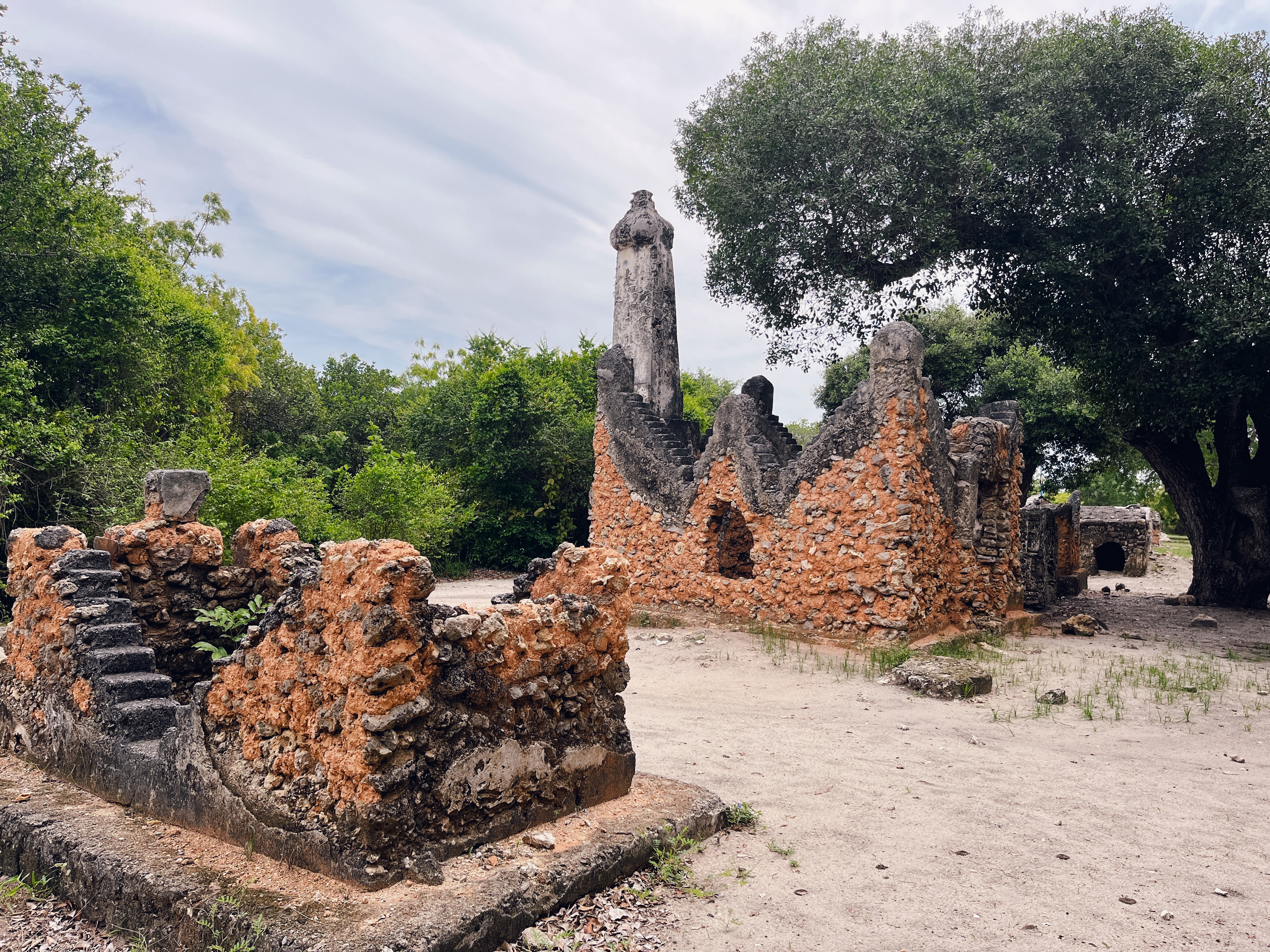
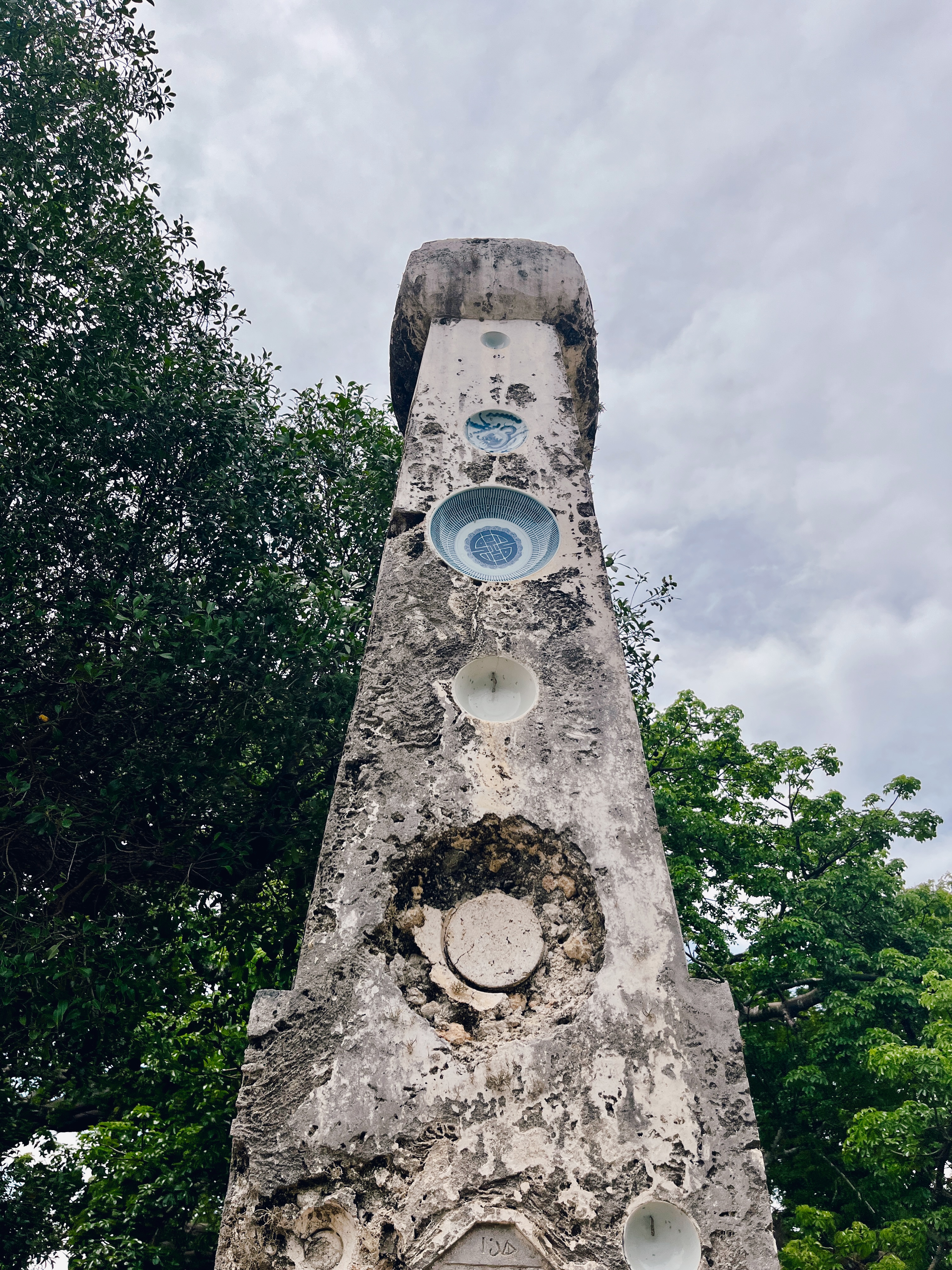
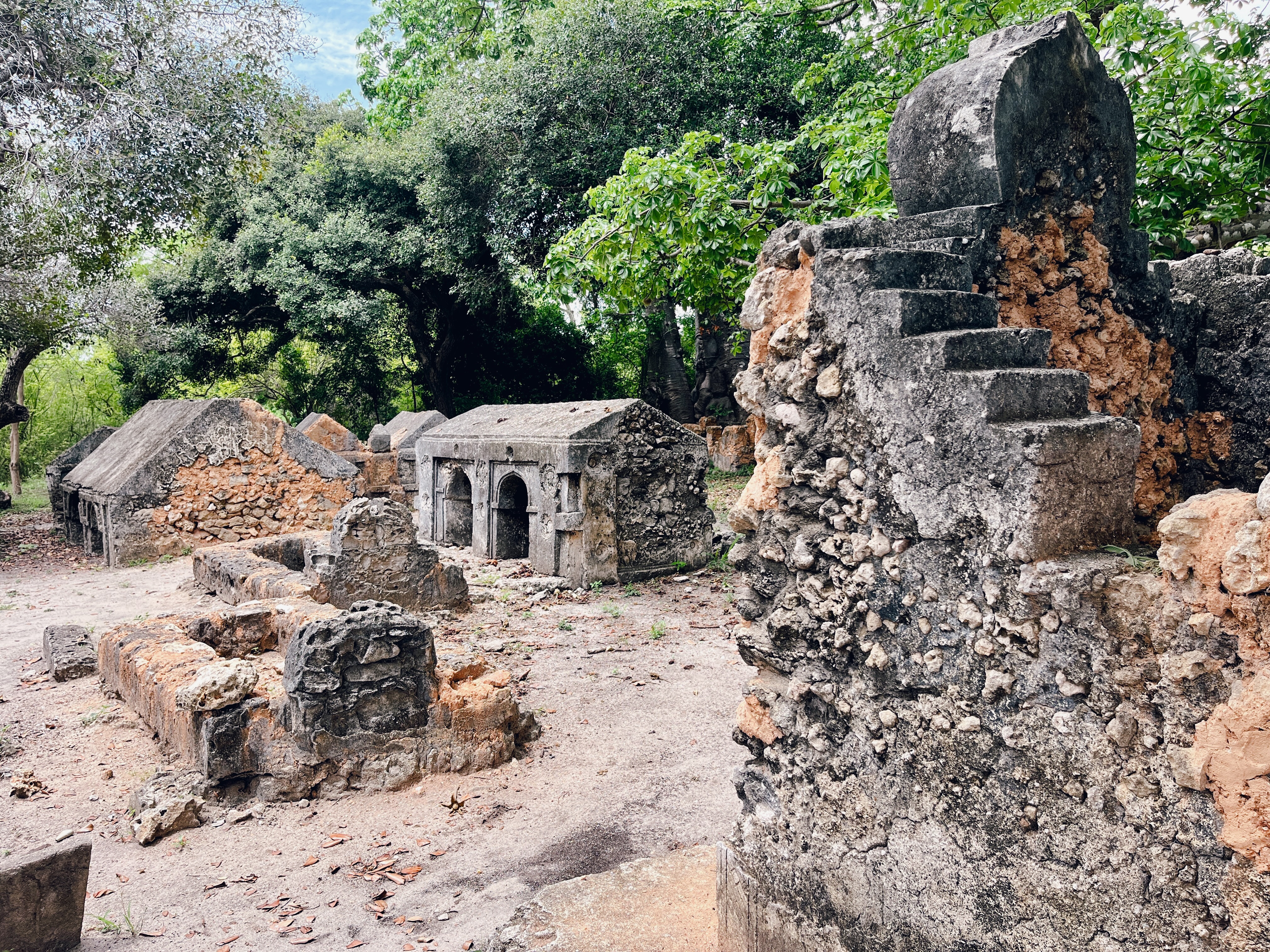
- From top to bottom: Kunduchi cemetery, Kunduchi Great pillar tomb with Ming porcelain & Step tomb in foreground

- Location within Tanzania
- 6°39′45.36″S 39°12′54″E
- Type: Settlement
- Cultures: Swahili
- Location: Kunduchi ward, Kinondoni District, Dar es Salaam Region, Tanzania

History
- Built: 10th century CE
- Abandoned: 18th century CE

Site notes
- Material: Coral rag
- Architectural styles: Swahili & Islamic
- Excavation dates: 1980s
- Archaeologists: Adria LaViolette & University of Dar es Salaam
- Owner: Tanzanian Government
- Management: Antiquities Division, Ministry of Natural Resources and Tourism

National Historic Sites of Tanzania
- Official name: Kunduchi Ruins Historic Site
- Type: Cultural

Kunduchi (Magofu ya mji wa kale wa Kunduchi in Swahili ) is a Medieval Swahili National Historic Site located in Kunduchi ward, located in Kinondoni District of Dar es Salaam Region in Tanzania. There is an excavated 15th-century mosque on the site. An 18th-century cemetery with the biggest collection of pillared tombs in East Africa, situated in a baobab woodland, and embellished with Ming era's porcelain plates. The pottery discovered here demonstrates the medieval town's affluence and trading connections with imperial China.

== History ==
The ancient Kunduchi communities were skilled ironworkers who made a living off of farming, fishing, hunting, and herding. Slags and significant amounts of EIW pottery provide evidence for the manufacturing of iron and pottery, substantiating this claim. As a result, the earliest inhabitants of Kunduchi were a part of the larger Swahili coast cultural and technological environment, which also included Mafia Island, Limbo, and the wale sites of the Rufiji Delta and Mbuamaii, which are all located approximately 35 km south of Kunduchi.

Oral traditions attribute the founding of Kunduchi to the Debli people, whose ancestry and demise are still unknown. According to reports, the Debli people were a part of a Bantu muslim community organization that constructed mosques at several locations along Tanzania's coast, including Kunduchi, Tongoni, and Mbweni. There are Digo clans with Kunduchi in their name that indicate a connection. The Hadimu residents of Makunduchi in Unguja South Region of Zanzibar, assert that their settlement's name Makunduchi is derived from this location, as the name of the location they assert to have come from was on the mainland across from the southernmost part of the island.

Additionally, according to the site's historical records, Kunduchi's mosque dates to around 1500 CE. Stone construction at Kunduchi came to an end at the start of the sixteenth century or earlier when the Portuguese sailed to East Africa and established a monopoly on commerce in luxury items like gold and ivory based on an analysis of the architectural styles of both the mosque and tombs.

Despite being small, Kunduchi's little-known history is fascinating and plays a key role in the history of the East African coast. Kunduchi was inactive until the late eighteenth century, when the majority of its stone-built tombs date. The history of the location, especially its ties to other regions of the Indian Ocean, lacked sufficient depth in terms of both its historical and thematic scope. A mosque and coral stone-made graves were built starting in the fourteenth century, with a 200-year interval between them, during this little-known time period. Even though most have been destroyed over the centuries, these monuments are still clearly visible today in Kunduchi ward. The trade products, primarily imported pottery and beads, are what give Kunduchi its importance.

Kunduchi Mosque
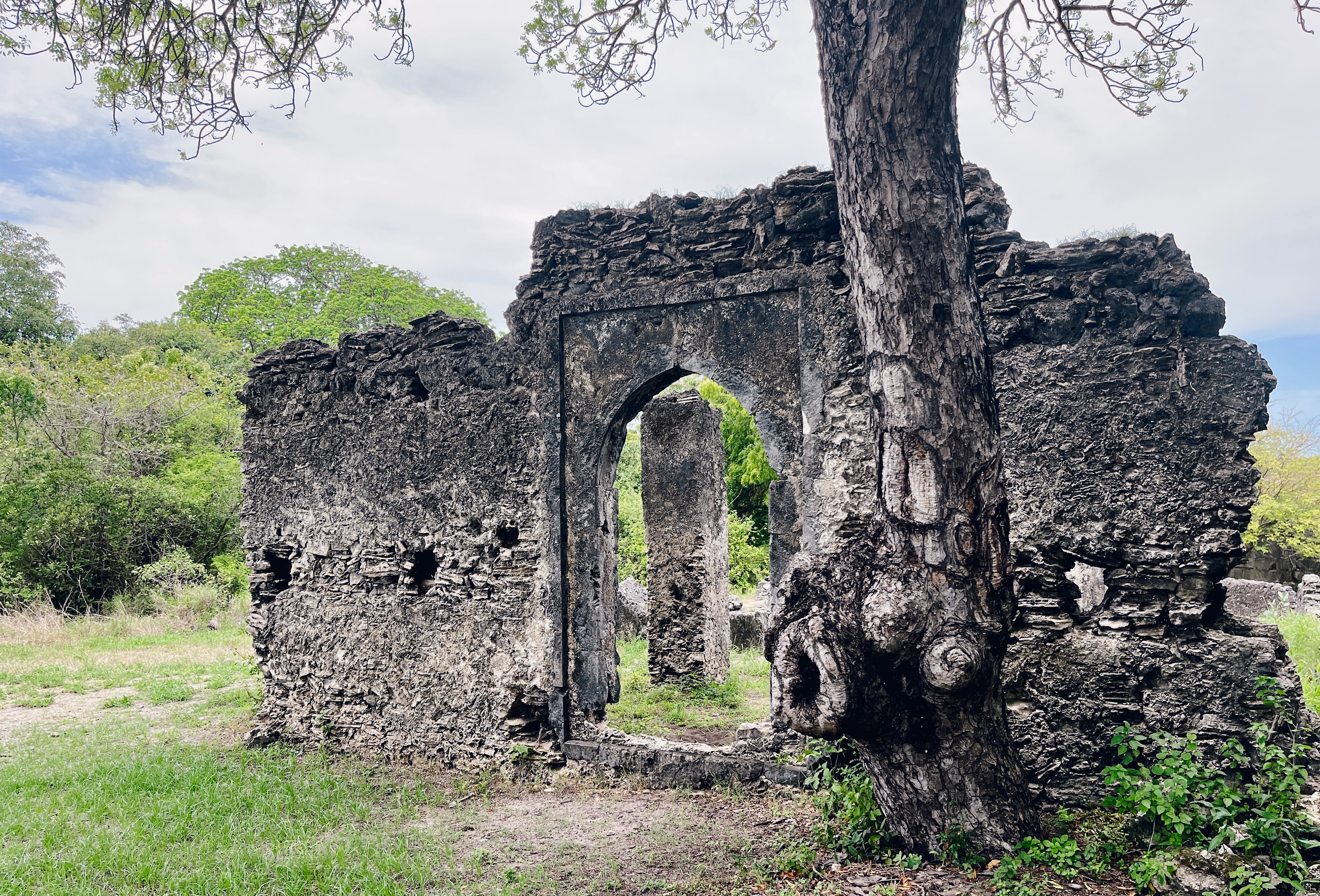
Front of the mosque

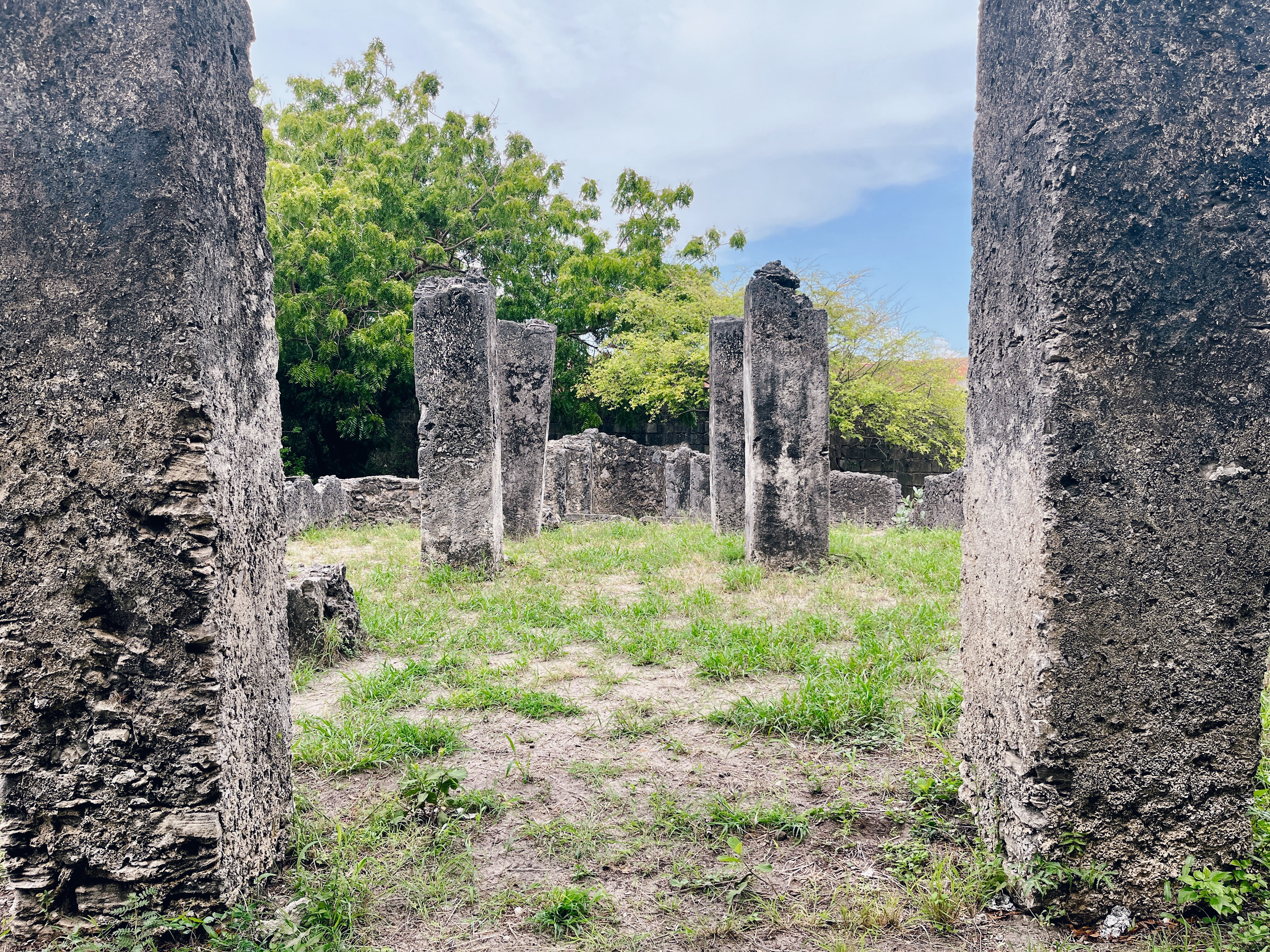
Mosque interior pillars

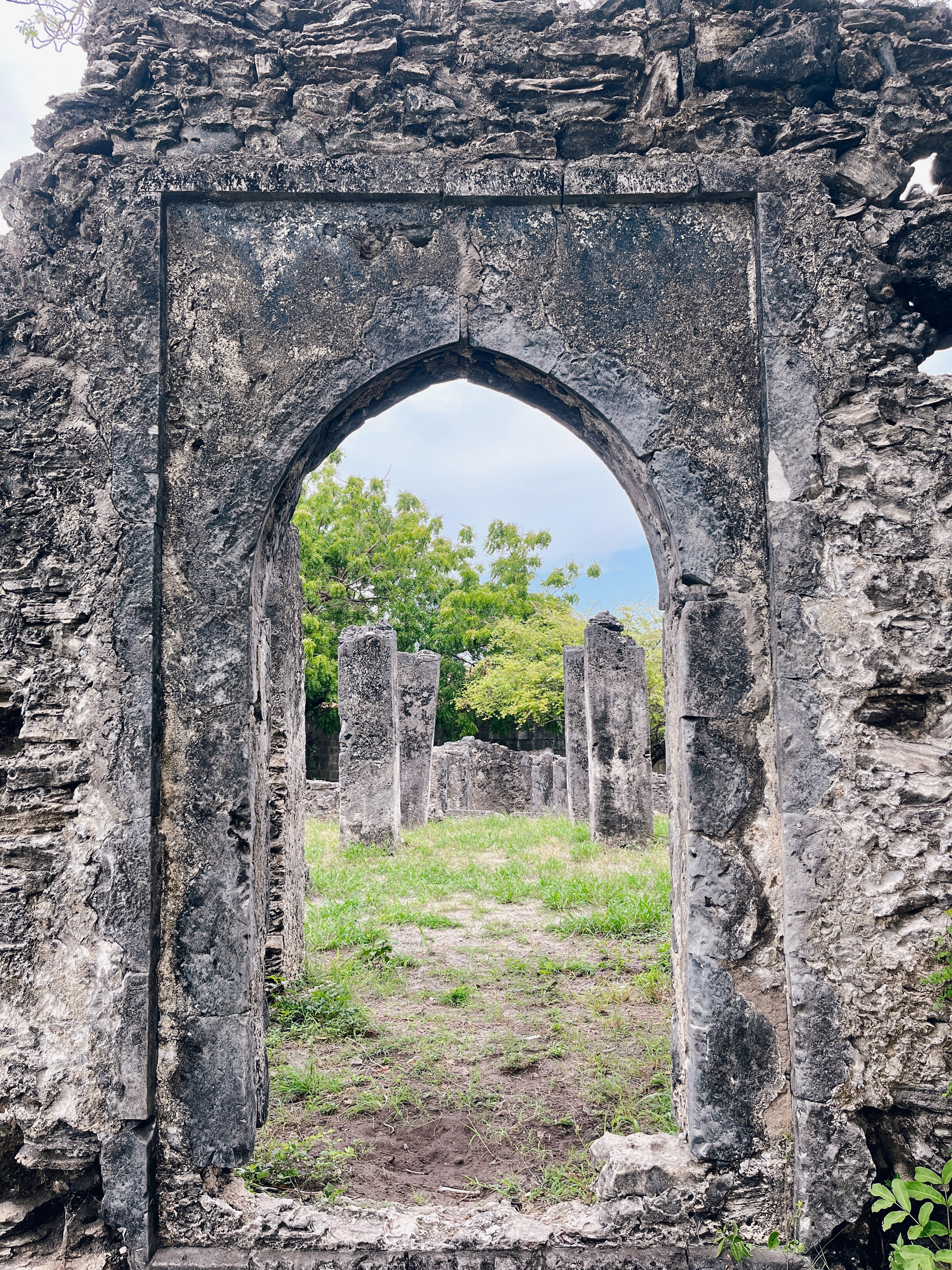
Mosque door frame

== Trade with Ming China ==
The native residents of the East African coast established linkages in international trade for centuries, according to chronicles and documentary sources by outside travelers. Several Chinese texts mention several journeys from China to the East African coast, even though they do not precisely mention the Tanzanian coast, which is a portion of the Swahili coast that the Chinese visited.

For instance, the Chinese sent several expeditions to Africa during the Ming period. Descriptions of the African territories visited on two of these journeys from the years 1417–1419 and 1421–1422 CE include details about the boats that connected the interior and other coastal towns. Along with a mosque and stone-built tombs with Arabic epitaphs, Kunduchi is one of numerous stone towns along the Swahili coast. It has been hypothesized that Kunduchi's significance as a significant trading port town in Tanzania was demonstrated by these dedicatory inscriptions on gravestones as well as trade items, such as Chinese porcelain and beads.

== Tombs ==
The first completely certain record of Swahili words we have is found in the tomb of Sultan Shaf la-Haji at Kunduchi, which bears the date A.H. 1081(1670-1 CE) and mentions the name of his father Mwinyi Mtumaini. This predates by nearly 50 years the earliest Swahili manuscripts of completely certain date, which include some letters written by the Sultan and other notables of Kilwa between 1711 and 1728. The letters are still available at the Goa Archives.

Kunduchi features a number of antique and modern tombs in addition to the damaged mosque. Different architectural styles can be seen in the old stone tombs. Some have pillars, some have steps, and still others have quadrangular roofs. It was intended to pay tribute to the deceased with the pillared ones holding the exquisite Chinese porcelain bowls. Depending on the deceased person's status and that of his or her family, there must have been many ways to honor them. In other words, the pillar's extension and decoration with Chinese porcelains were not the only ways to pay respect to the deceased. more types were employed instead, and the Kunduchi Ruins site also provides several more distinctive styles.

These methods included, among others, adorning the tombs with numerous varieties of Chinese porcelain and constructing the tomb in a distinctive architectural design. Another way to pay respect to the deceased must have been to raise the tomb pillar, engrave the tombstone, and decorate the graves with either star-shaped embellishments or steps-like cuttings. Another tomb was ornamented with around 35 pieces of Chinese porcelain in various sizes but lacked steps or pillars.

Tombs of Kunduchi
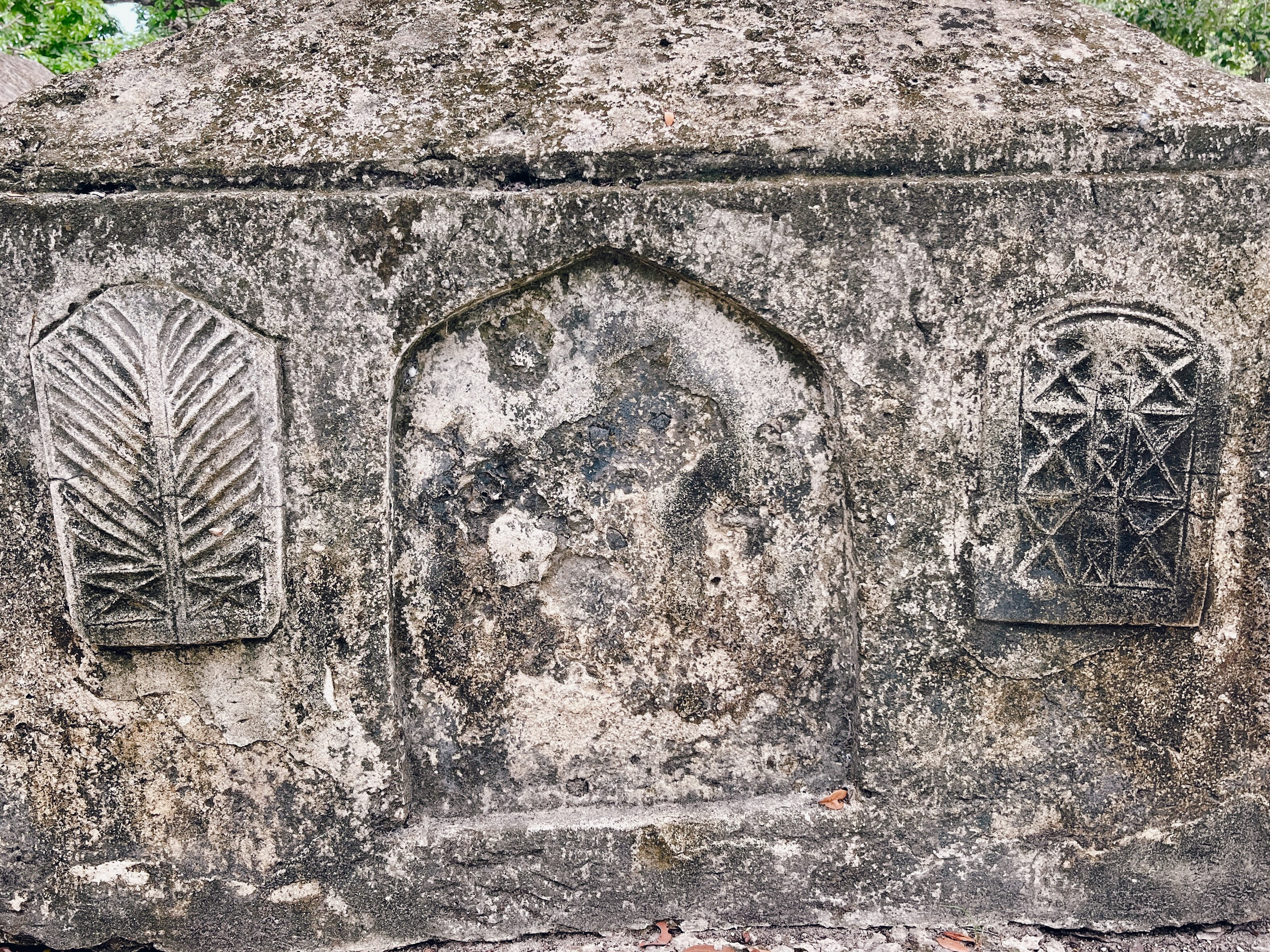
Tomb decorations

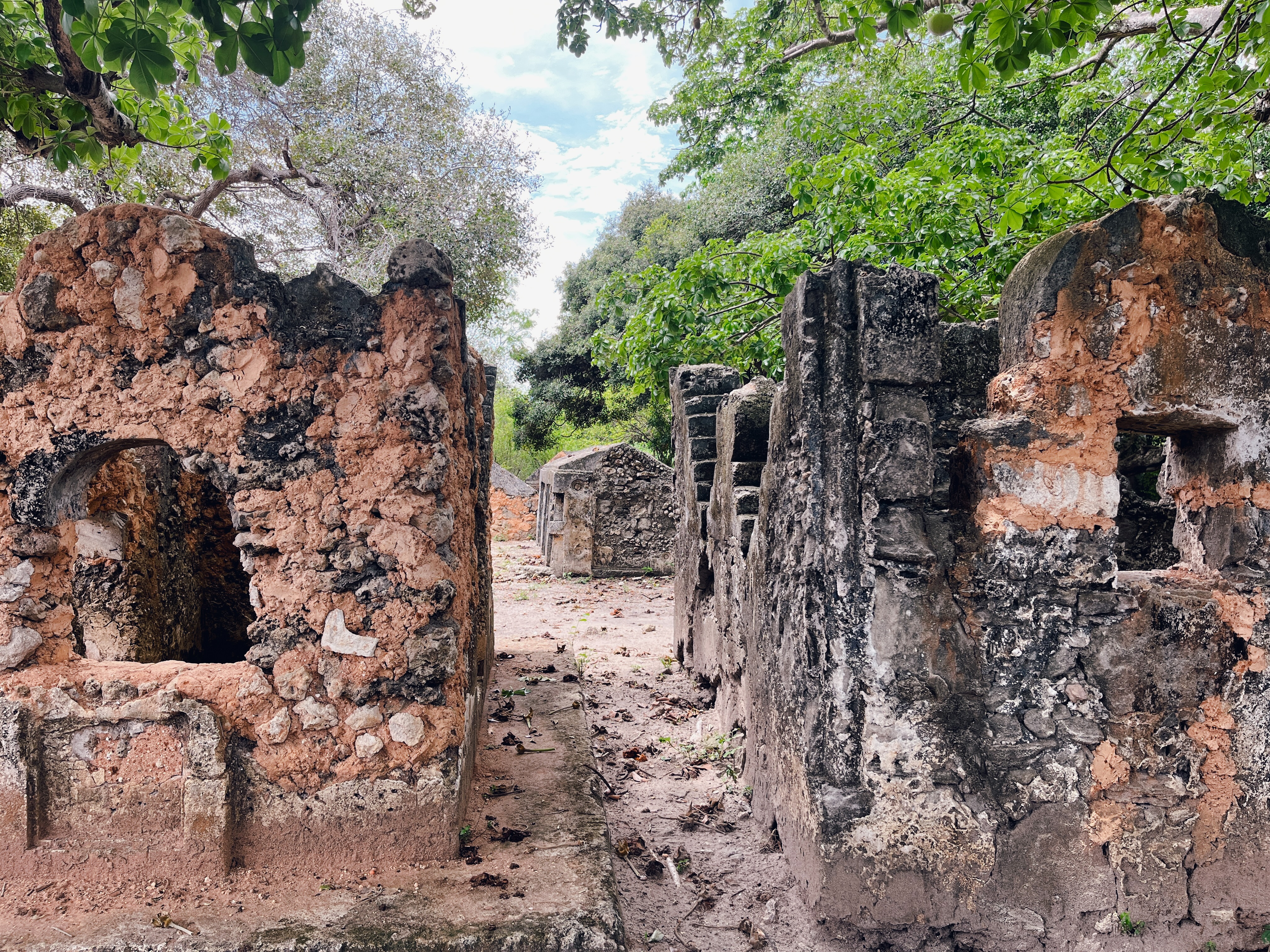
Tomb around the site

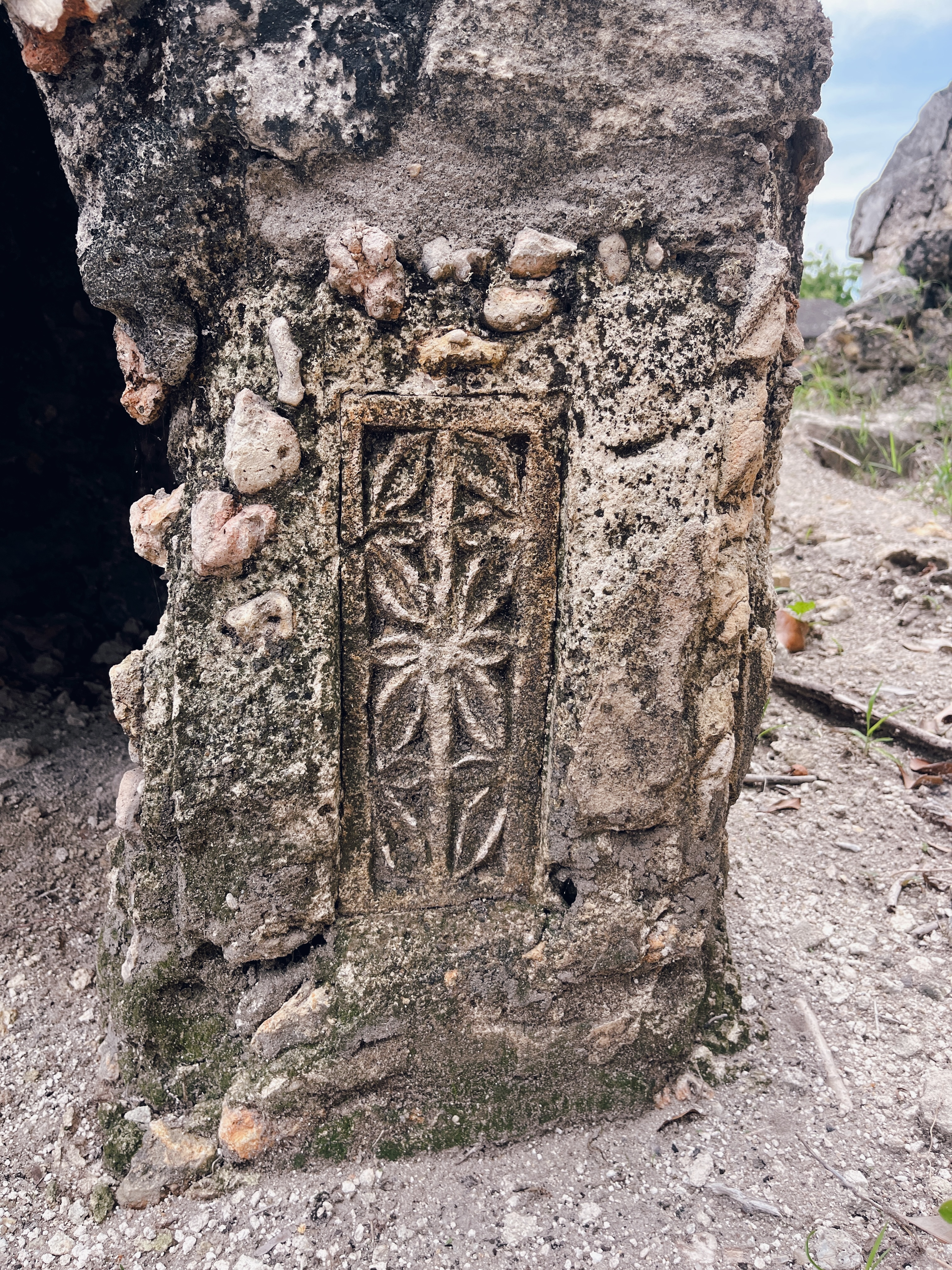
Florette designs on tomb

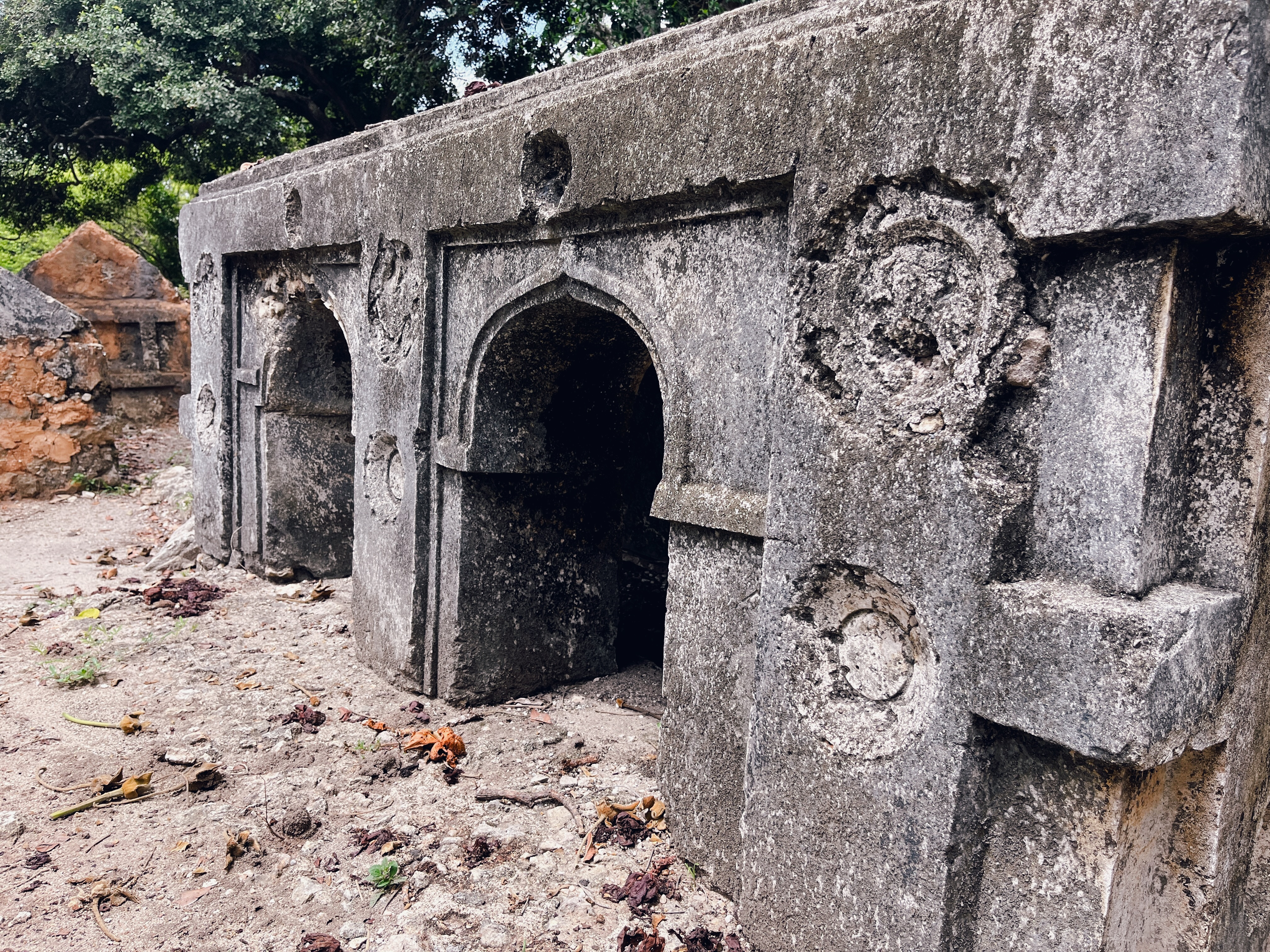
Tomb with arches

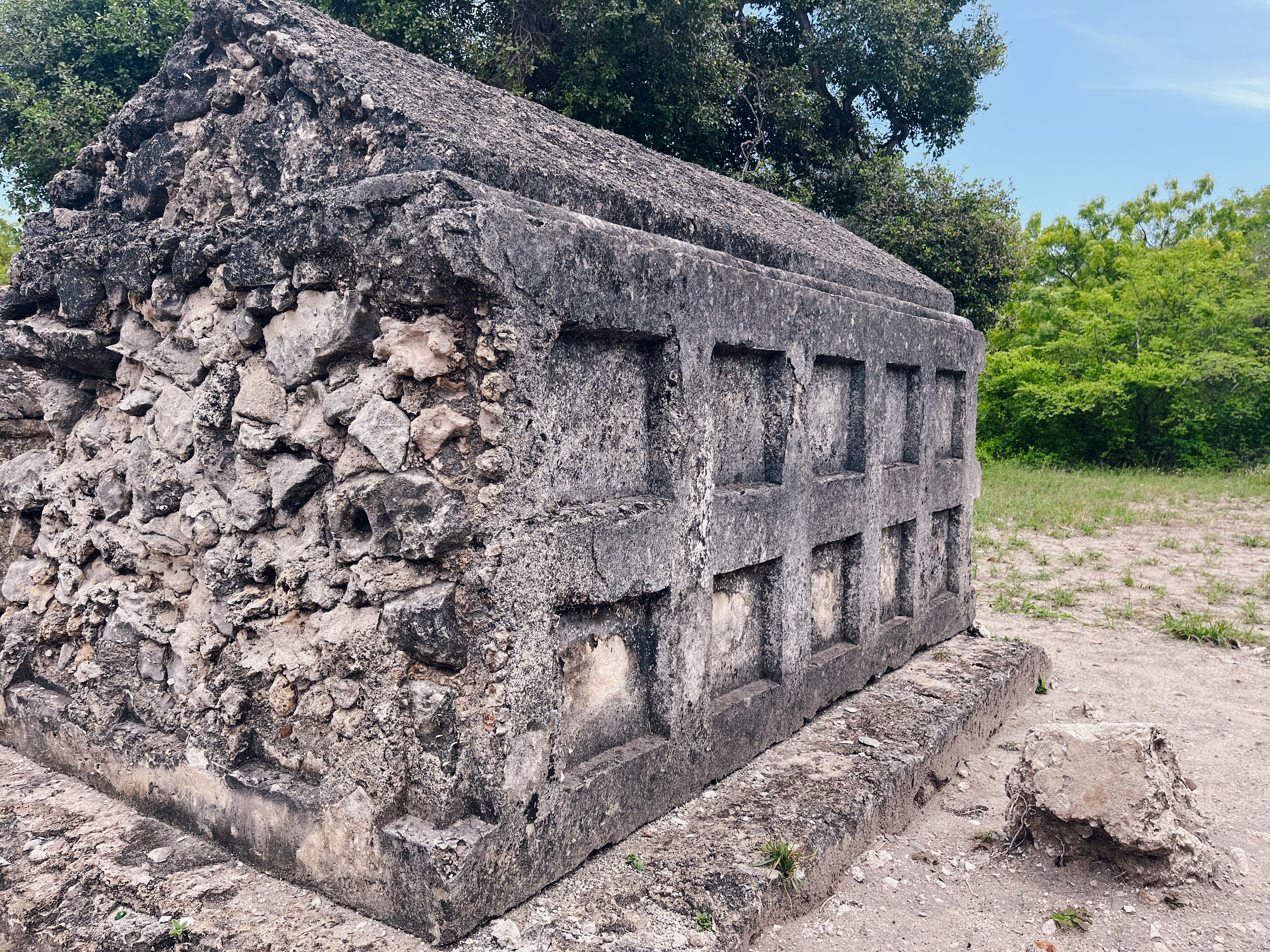
Tomb with coffin shape

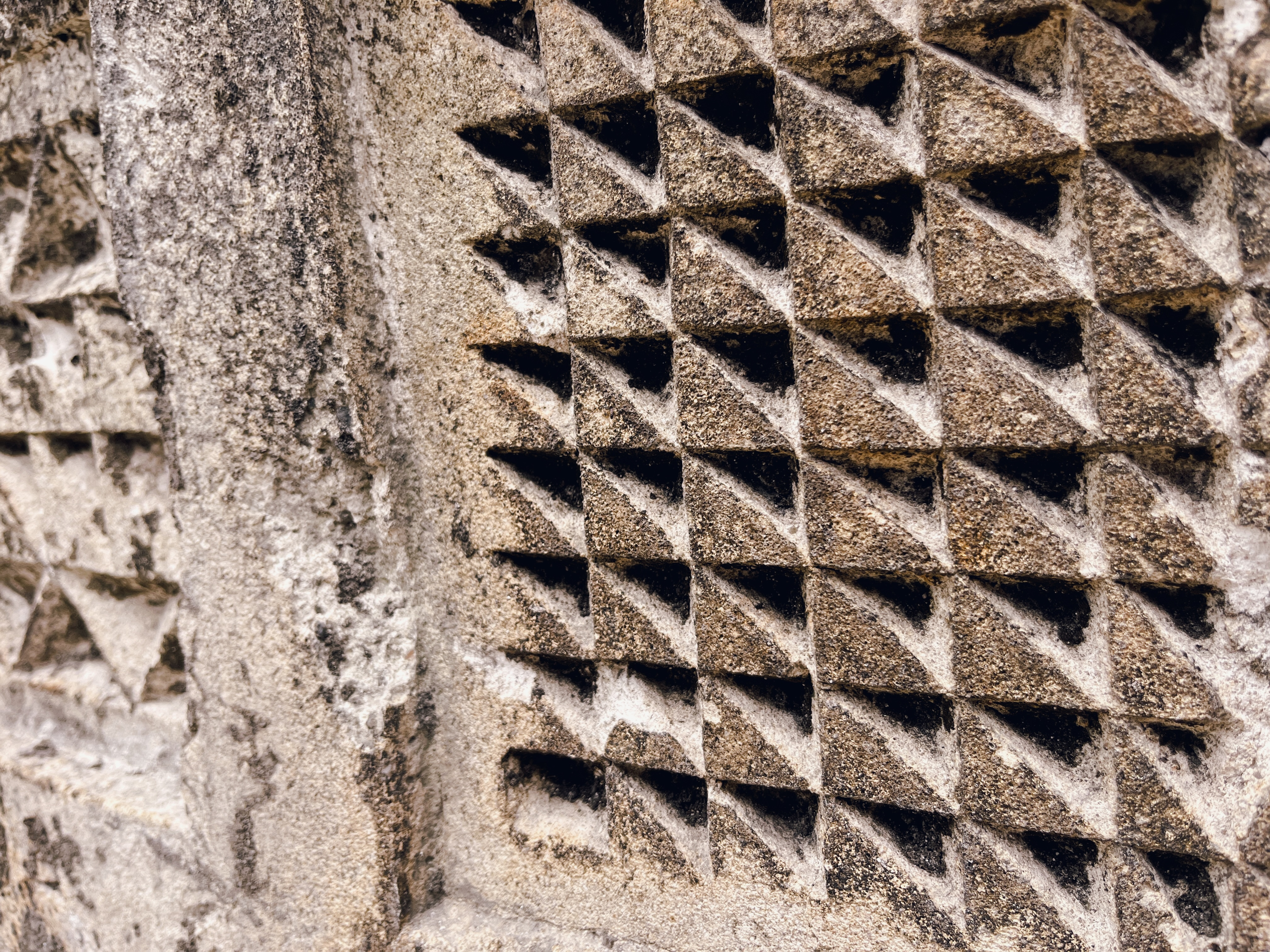
Tomb with unique details

== Excavations ==
Richard Burton's descriptions from the nineteenth century mention Kunduchi but do not go into detail about its mosque, stone-built graves, or the Chinese pottery adorning the tombs. Most likely, the area was obscured by vegetation. Alternately, Burton and his colleagues decided they were not significant enough to mention. The recent research demonstrates Kunduchi's historical significance even if its whole history is still mostly unknown. Kunduchi was one of the most beautiful Swahili sites, especially along Tanzania's central coast, as demonstrated by archaeological artifacts found in its test pits. If not the most significant or picturesque site, Kunduchi was undoubtedly among the top three.

The site has only ever been the subject of one major archaeological investigation, in the late 1980s. An archaeological field school was run by Adria LaViolette and associates from the University of Dar es Salaam for two years in a row (1987–1988). Between Dar es Salaam and Bagamoyo, the team conducted surveys and dug test trenches at various old Swahili localities, including ones Kunduchi. LaViolette and colleagues detailed the tombs at Kunduchi, assessed the area, and dug two test pits in the northwest corner of the mosque, close to the shore.

Diverse cultural artifacts were found at the site during surveys and test excavations, including potsherds that are likely from the Tana/TIW tradition and Sasanian Islamic ceramics, bead grinders, slag, and a copper coin from the early Sultan of Kilwa. Based on these cultural artifacts, the team came to the conclusion that Kunduchi had been inhabited at least since the tenth century and that one of the main crafts practiced in the village was ironworking. This result, however, would have been much more convincing if the data had been thoroughly examined and contextualized.

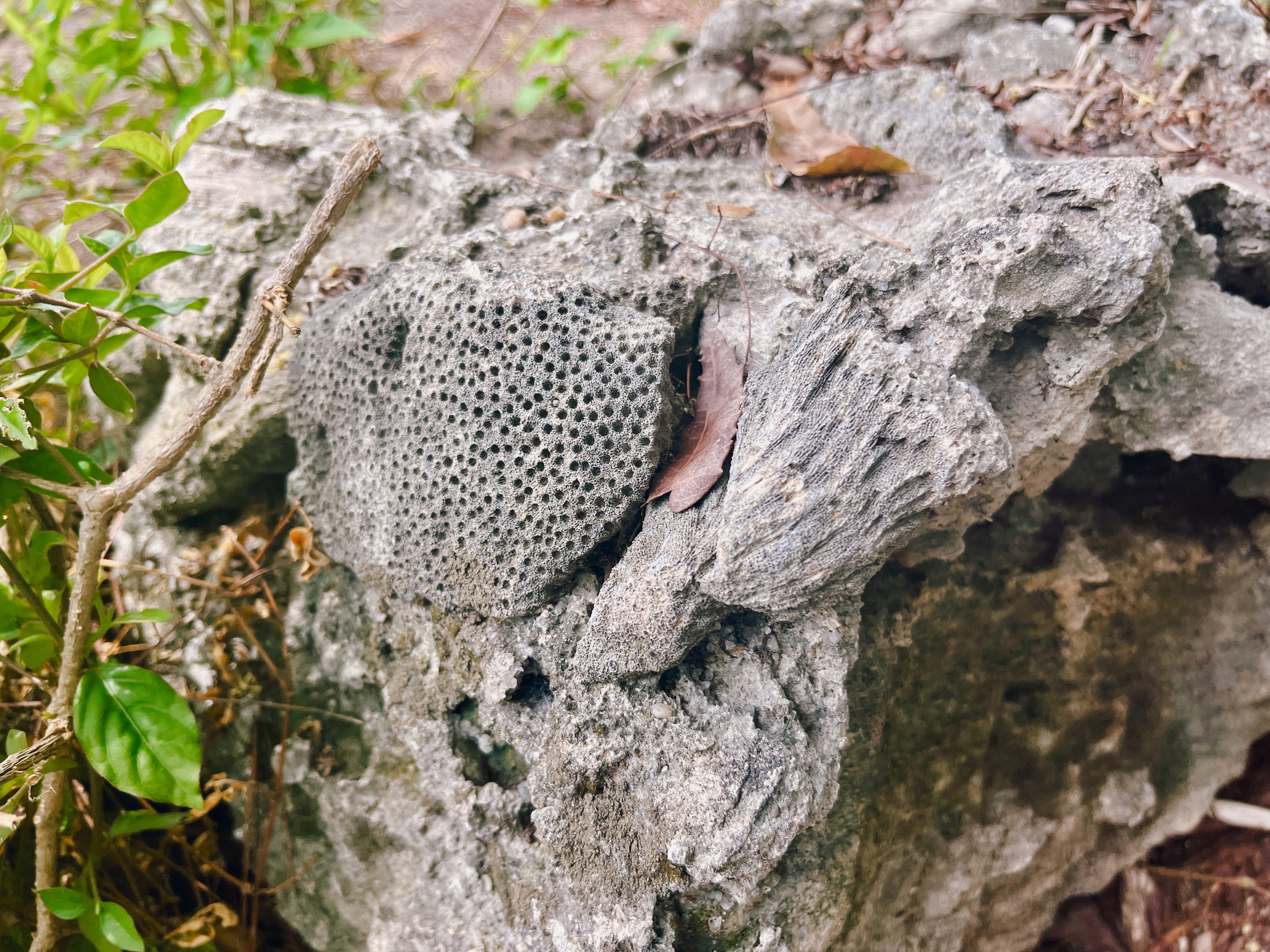
Coral rag found in the ruin used to build the Kunduchi

There is very little discussion of the retrieved cultural materials. In addition, the context of the items was not properly documented to define the site's cultural sequence. Due to these restrictions, the history of the site and the relationships between the retrieved cultural objects and potential regional connections were not clearly established. The aforementioned restrictions made it difficult to determine the Kunduchi settlement's actual chronological antecedents.

Settlements from the early first millennium CE were discovered in the Kunduchi site and its surroundings as a result of the 1980s surveys and excavations. This claim is supported by the discovery of daubs with pole and stick impressions in Test Pit I and 3's lower levels. Additionally, this early dating is supported by a review of cross-dateable materials like bead grinders and daub from surveys and later trenches. This early chronological history is not exceptional nor surprising because other sites on the coast of East Africa have similar stories that have been documented by researchers.

Ancient inhabitants at Kunduchi were also involved in international trade networks, as evidenced by the finding of Sasanian pottery, Near-East blue-yellow glazed pottery, and sgraffito pottery in the surrounding settlements of Mbuamaji and Kaole. At Kilwa, Tumbe on Pemba Island, and Unguja Ukuu, similar imports have been observed. Additionally, the discovery of bead grinders, spindle whorls, pendants, imported beads, and pottery from earlier periods (pre-Islamic, sixth to seventh centuries CE, eighth to tenth centuries CE, and beyond) confirms cultural continuity.

Between the tenth and the thirteenth century AD, the Plain Ware tradition that followed the Islamic era emerged. Although further proof is required to support these findings, researchers near Tanzania's southern coast were able to find an earlier date for the Zanjan Phase's emergence—roughly the seventh century. The evidence revealed from the neighboring sites of Kaole in Bagamoyo and Mbuamaji in the Kigamboni District of Dar es Salaam supports the Plain Ware culture discovered at Kunduchi. A Swahili custom that predates this one dates from between the twelfth and sixteenth centuries CE. There are a variety of material remnants, including glass beads, Kunduchi glass, punctately decorated carinated ceramics, and various Islamic artifacts.

According to the data presented above, Kunduchi first appeared between the last centuries of the Early Iron Age and the second half of the second millennium CE. Up until the sixteenth century CE, when it fell into isolation for about two centuries, it then underwent a revival in the eighteenth century. Results from test excavations as well as questionnaires show continuous cultural continuity up to this time, supporting the claim that culture was declining.

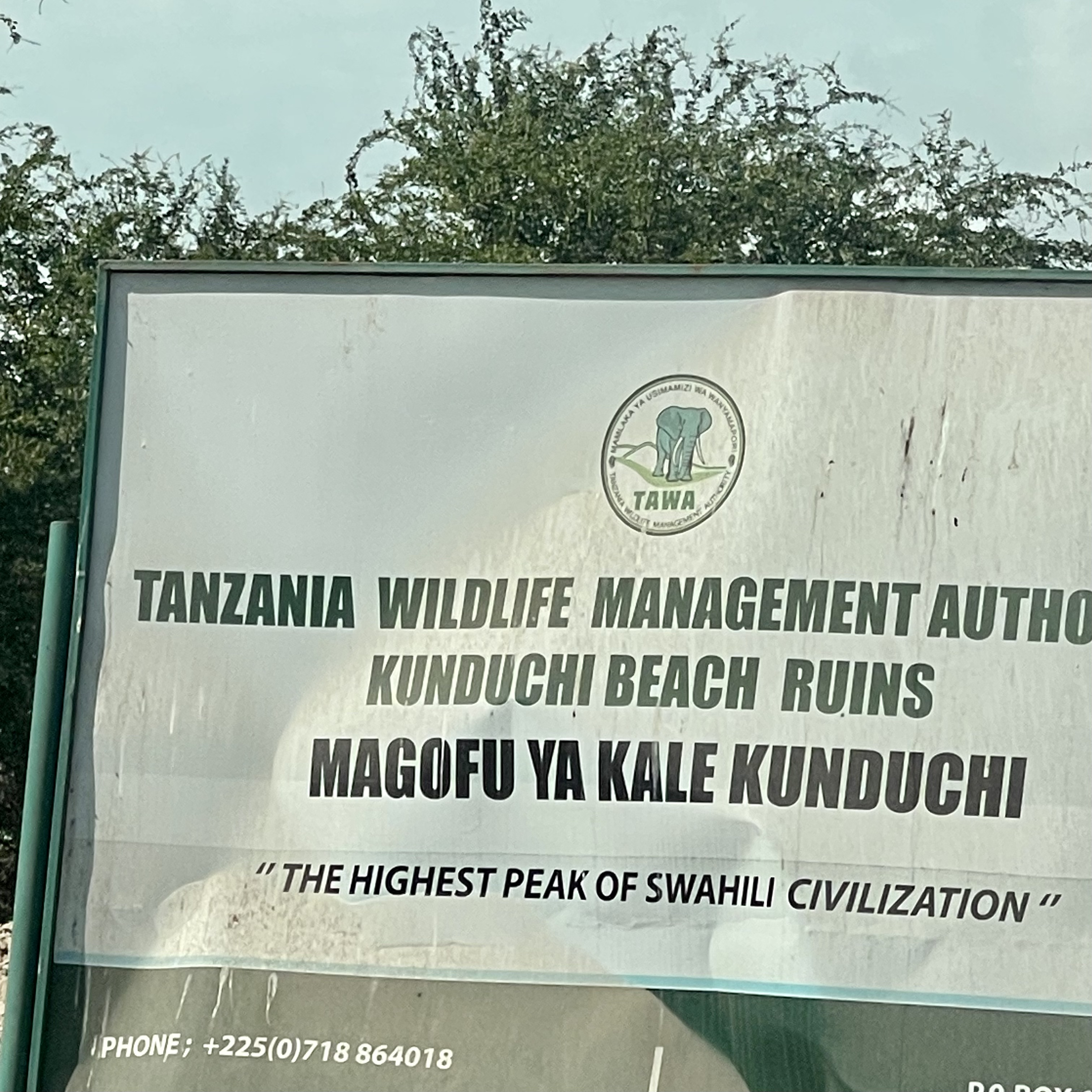
Kunduchi Ruins, Kunduchi Ward, Kinondoni

== See also ==
- Historic Swahili Settlements
- Kaole
- Kimbiji Ruins
- Tongoni Ruins
- Msuka Mjini Ruins
- Kichokochwe Ruins
- Pujini Ruins
