= Kimbiji Ruins =

National Historic Site of Tanzania

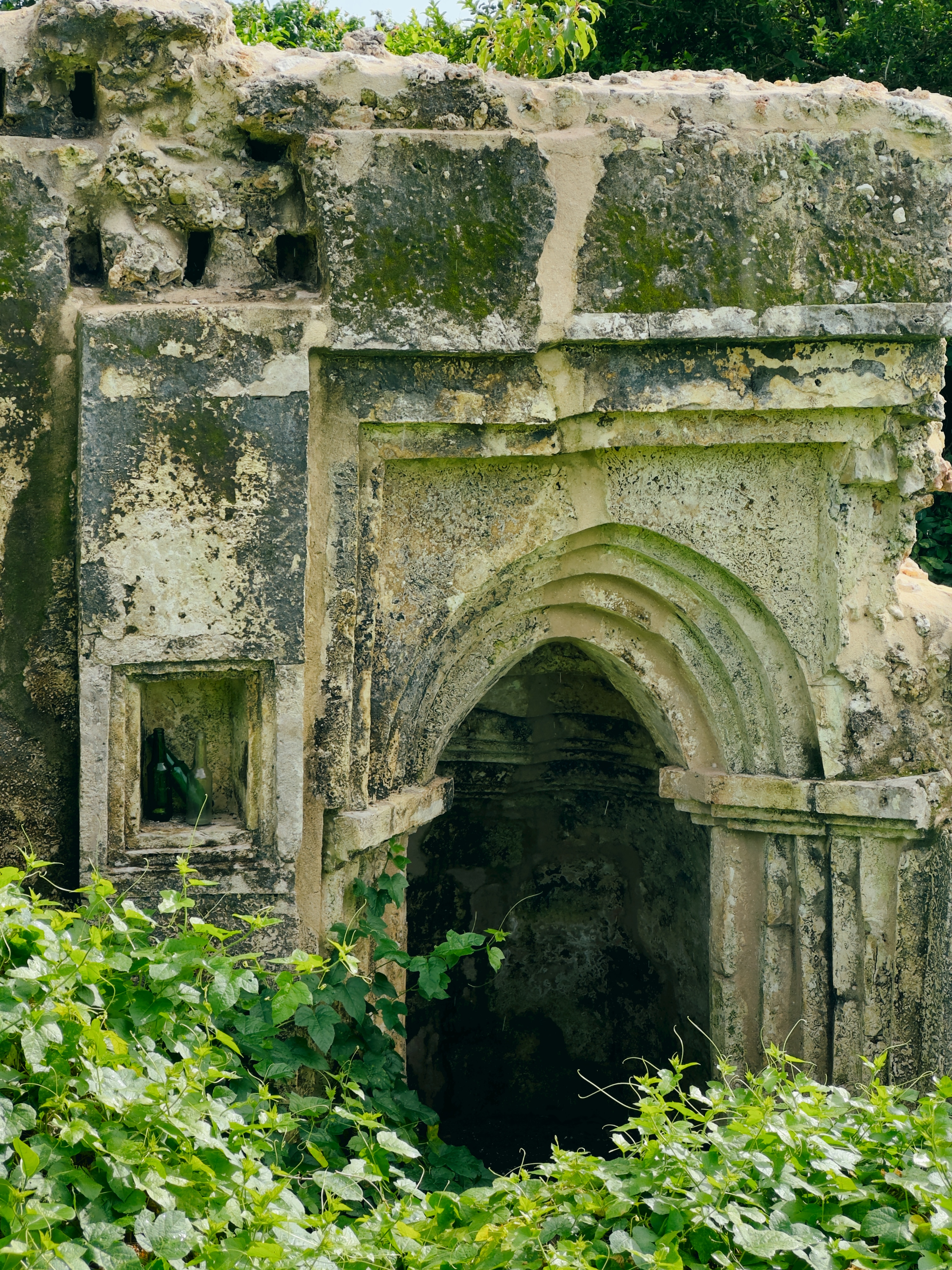
- Old Kimbiji Mosque

- Location within Tanzania
- 6°58′59.88″S 39°31′53.4″E
- Type: Settlement
- Cultures: Swahili
- Location: Kimbiji ward, Kigamboni District, Dar es Salaam Region, Tanzania

History
- Built: 10th century CE
- Abandoned: 18th century CE

Site notes
- Material: Coral rag
- Architectural styles: Swahili & Islamic
- Condition: Endangered
- Owner: Tanzanian Government
- Management: Antiquities Division, under the Ministry of Natural Resources and Tourism

National Historic Sites of Tanzania
- Official name: Kimbiji Ruins Historic Site
- Type: Cultural
- Currently neglected and vandalized

Kimbiji Ruins (Swahili: Magofu ya mji wa kale wa Kimbiji) is a Medieval Swahili, National Historic Site located in Kimbiji ward of Kigamboni District in Dar es Salaam Region of Tanzania. Although the site has been vandalized by an illegally felled tree that fell on the mosque, the Tanzanian government is working to launch restoration measures as soon as possible.

== History ==
The location of this place is around 300 meters to the east of Kimbiji town. There are stone ruins there with a lot of indigenous and foreign pottery on the surface. Additionally, there is a mosque that is in ruins and is thought to have been built in the 18th century A.D. The land around the mosque is a cemetery, and the majority of the burials contain large fragments of European objects from the 18th and 19th centuries that were utilized in religious acts. Local potsherds were found in great quantity in a shovel test trench dug at the location, which was filled to a depth of 80 cm with them. The site may have been inhabited continuously for a very long time, according to finds from the deposits.

== See also ==
- Historic Swahili Settlements
- Kaole
- Kunduchi Ruins
- Msuka Mjini Ruins
- Kichokochwe Ruins
- Pujini Ruins
- Mbutu Bandarini
