= Pujini Ruins =

National Historic Site of Tanzania

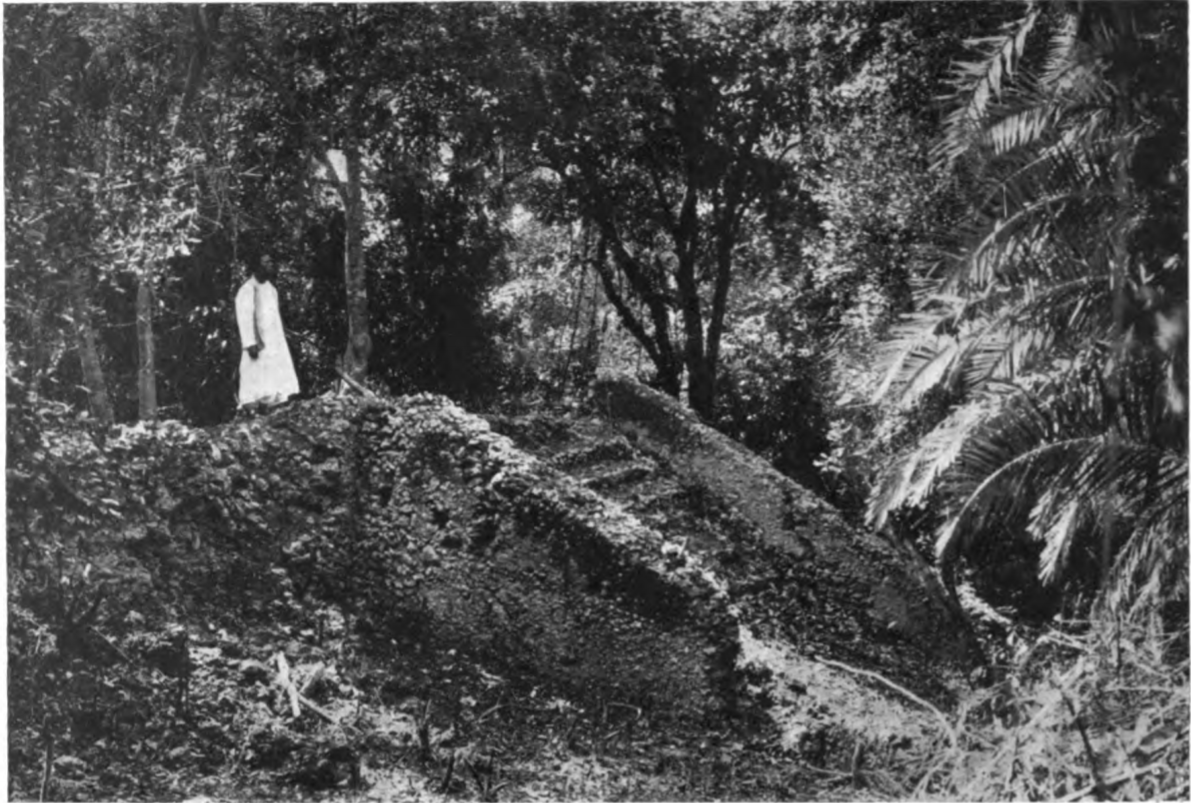
- The stairway to the rampart, Pujini ruins, Pemba South.

- Location within Tanzania
- 5°19′40.8″S 39°47′4.56″E
- Type: Settlement
- Cultures: Swahili
- Location: Chake Chake District, Pemba South Region, Tanzania

History
- Built: 12-14th century CE
- Abandoned: 17th century CE

Site notes
- Material: Coral rag
- Architectural styles: Swahili & Islamic
- Owner: Tanzanian Government
- Management: Antiquities Division, Ministry of Natural Resources and Tourism
- Public access: yes

National Historic Sites of Tanzania
- Official name: Pujini Ruins Historic Site
- Type: Cultural

Pujini Ruins (Magofu ya mji wa kale wa Pujini in Swahili ) is a medieval historic site next to the village of Pujini located in Chake Chake District of Pemba South Region. There used to be a fortified palace at the site, only ruins of the walls remain. The palace is believed to have been of Mkame Mdume. Its one of several National Historic Sites on the island of Pemba including Chambani and Ras Mkumbuu.

== See also ==
- Historic Swahili Settlements
- Kunduchi Ruins
- Kimbiji Ruins
- Tongoni Ruins
- Msuka Mjini Ruins
- Kichokochwe Ruins
