= Msuka Mjini Ruins =

National Historic Site of Tanzania

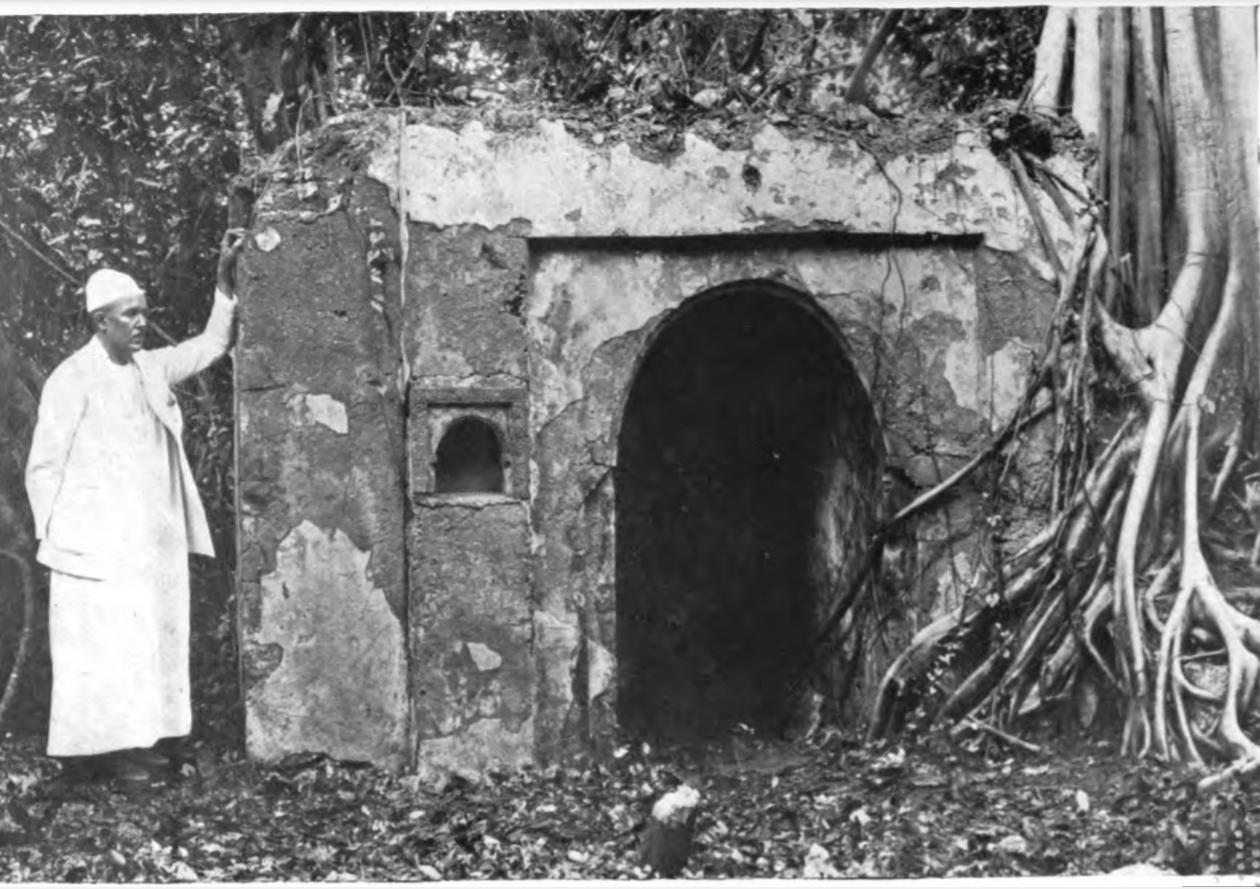
- Mosque ruins at Msuka Mjini, 1920

- Location within Tanzania
- 4°54′40.32″S 39°43′40.08″E
- Type: Settlement
- Cultures: Swahili
- Location: Micheweni District, Pemba North Region, Tanzania

History
- Built: 15th century CE

Site notes
- Material: Coral rag
- Architectural styles: Swahili & Islamic
- Condition: Endangered
- Owner: Tanzanian Government
- Management: Antiquities Division, Ministry of Natural Resources and Tourism

National Historic Sites of Tanzania
- Official name: Msuka Mjini Ruins Historic Site
- Type: Cultural

Msuka Mjini Ruins (Swahili Mji wa Kale wa Msuka Mjini) is a protected historic site located inside Micheweni District of Pemba North Region in Tanzania. Msuka Mjini has a Swahili mosque from the fifteenth century preserved in ruins on the Kigomasha peninsula on the island. The date 816AH (1414 CE) is carved on the interior of the circular mirhab.

== See also ==
- Historic Swahili Settlements
- Archaeology of Pemba Island
- Kunduchi Ruins
- Kimbiji Ruins
- Tongoni Ruins
- Pujini Ruins
