= Oyster nut =

Oyster nut (or its variants) may refer to either:

- Telfairia, a plant genus;
- Telfairia pedata, a species within the genus Telfairia
