= Coral rag =

Limestone composed of ancient coral reef material

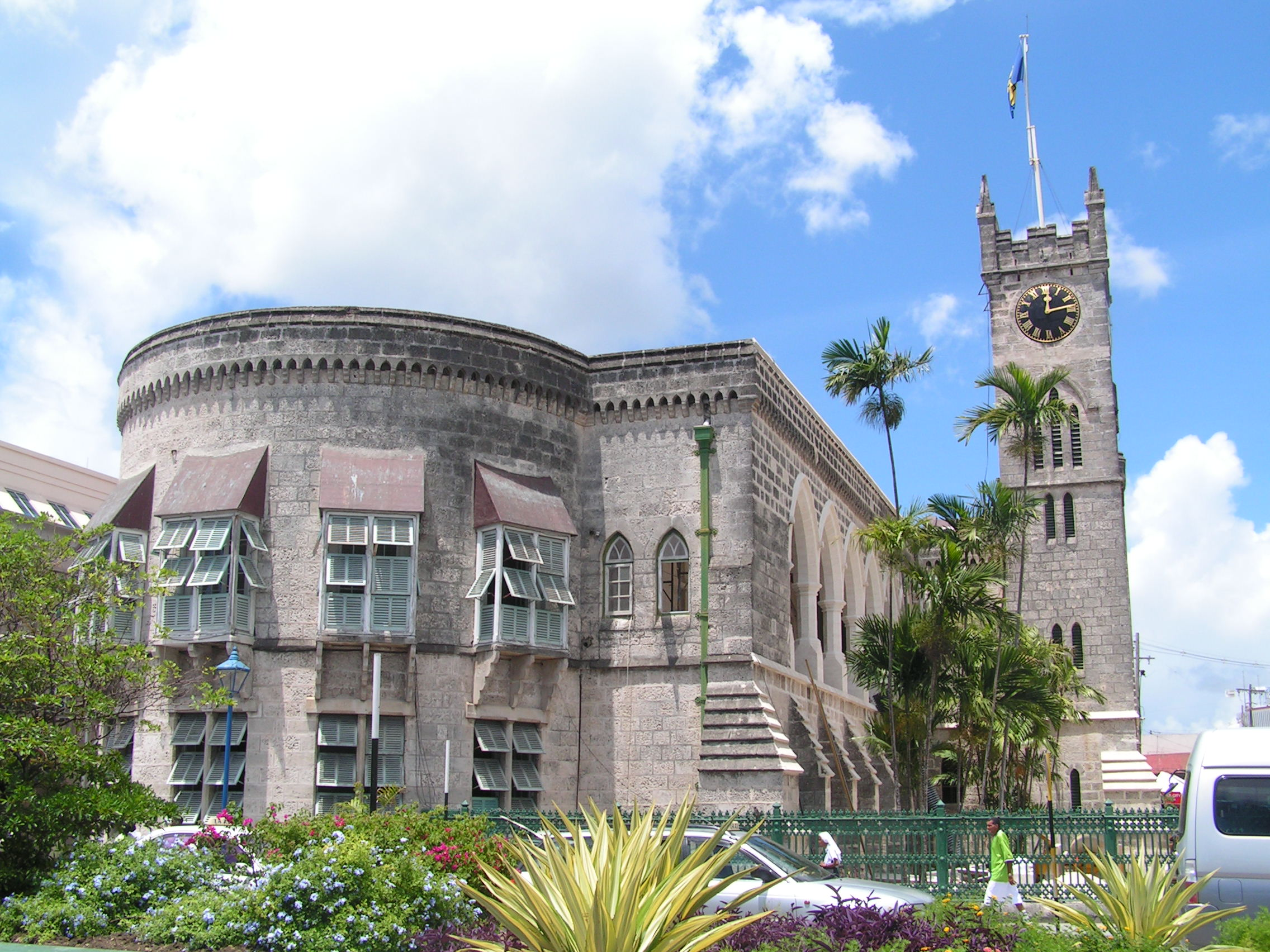
The west wing of the Parliament of Barbados (1872) is constructed of local coral rag.

Coral rag is a rubbly limestone composed of ancient coral reef material. The term also refers to the building blocks quarried from these strata, which are an important local building material in areas such as the coast of East Africa and the southeastern United States littoral (e.g. Florida, Bermuda).

It is also the name of a member—the Coral Rag Member—of the Upper Oxfordian Coralline Oolite Formation of North Yorkshire. "Calne Freestone And Coral Rag" is a former name for the Stanford Formation, which stretches from Westbury in Wiltshire to Waddesdon in Buckinghamshire.

== Varieties ==
- Corallian Limestone
- Keystone (limestone)

== See also ==
- Coral Rag Formation
- Coral sand
- List of types of limestone
