= Werner Graebner =

German musicologist and record producer, born 1953

- Born: 1953 (age 72–73); Radolfzell, West Germany
- Occupations: ethnomusicologist, music producer and author
- Years active: 1984–present
- Known for: Publications and music albums of Swahili music
- Notable work: CD-series Zanzibara
- Website: Website Jahazi Media

Werner Graebner (born 1953 in Radolfzell, West Germany) is a German Africanist, ethnomusicologist, music producer and author. Due to his recordings and publications on the music of Swahili culture, he is known as an expert on the popular musical cultures of East Africa. His work combines academic scholarship and music production, with editorial and creative roles in both written publications and musical releases.

== Life and career ==
Graebner completed his studies at the University of Mainz in 1984 with a master's thesis titled Urban Life in Africa: illustrated by selected popular texts from the Swahili-speaking world. As an Africanist, ethnomusicologist and music producer, he is specialised in documenting urban and popular cultures on the East Africa coast and the Comoros. Until 2005, he conducted research in these fields at the Universities of Frankfurt, Cologne and Bayreuth. Since the late 1980s, he has also worked as freelance journalist and producer of musical albums.

Graebner has documented popular music cultures in East Africa, including taarab music in Zanzibar and the coastal regions of Tanzania mainland. Further, he has focussed on taarab styles in Mombasa, Kenya, and the Comoros. In the Tanzanian metropolis Dar es Salaam, he has studied the informal music scenes of youth culture. One of the best-known groups in this musical genre is the Jagwa Music Band with its collective improvisations. This music, known as mchiriku, has been rejected by official media and the country's government as an expression of marginalised social groups, but is extremely popular in the urban subculture.

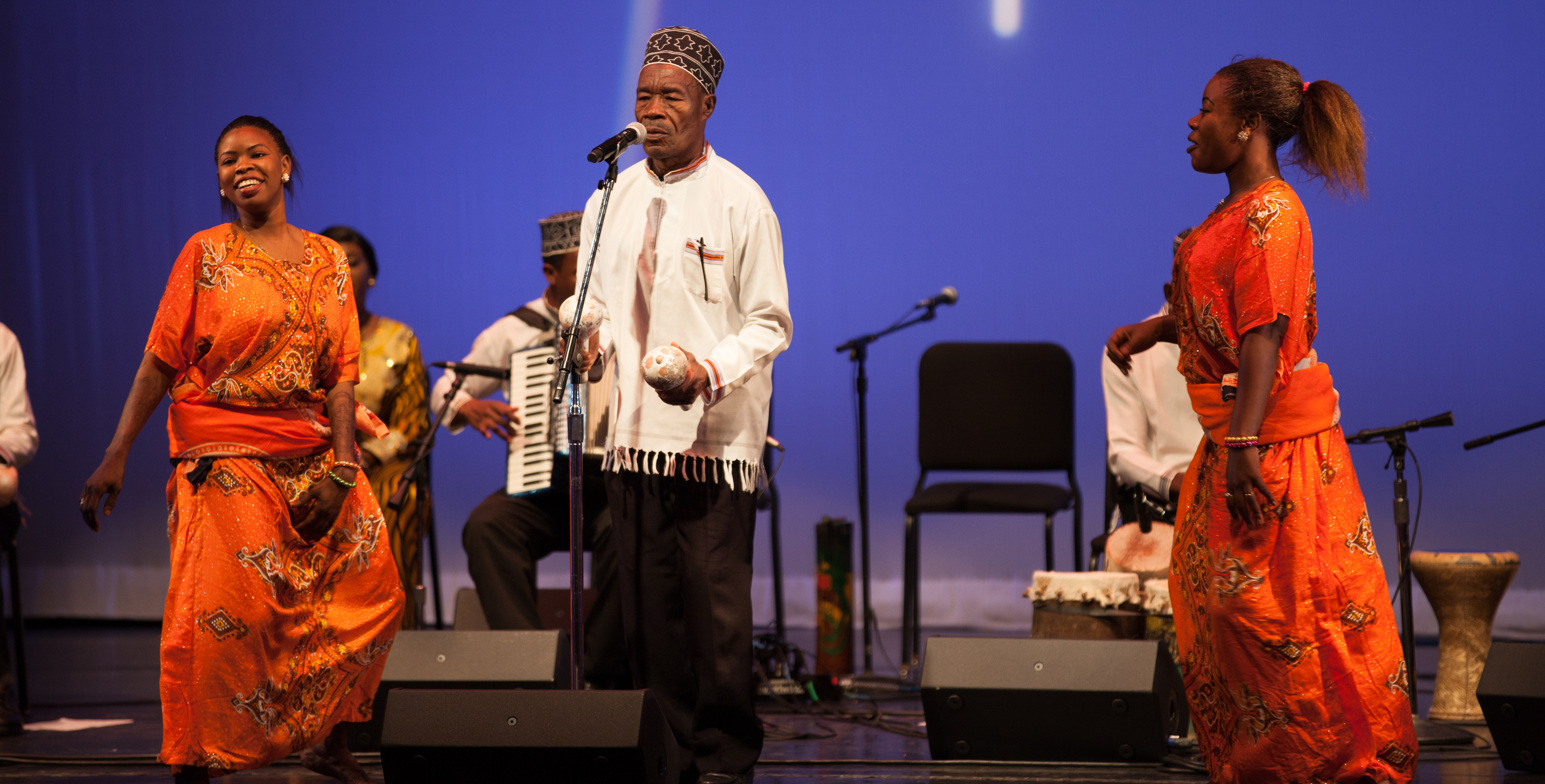
Taarab musicians Rajab Suleiman & Kithara, 2016

In two musical portraits of Zanzibar, BBC Radio 3 broadcast interviews with Graebner as an expert speaking about the island's taarab music. For the Rough Guides to World Music in Africa, he wrote chapters on the sound of the Swahili coast and on the popular dance style mtindo, while also editing the album The Rough Guide to the Music of Tanzania. Further, the Bloomsbury Encyclopedia of Popular Music of the World published Graebner's overviews of several musical genres in Tanzania, Zanzibar, Kenya and the Comoros. His studies and liner notes for recordings are considered essential reading for understanding popular music in Tanzania in the 1980s.

As a co-producer, Graebner released a documentary film about the oldest Taarab ensemble in Zanzibar, Ikhwani Safaa. Additionally, he has produced musical albums distributed by labels such as Buda Musique, Harmonia Mundi and his own music labels Dizim Records, Jahazi Media and Jagwa Music. In 2021, his taarab compilation Zanzibara 10 was the number one world music album at the Transglobal World Music Chart. Further, Graebner also acted as writer, photographer and sound engineer for recordings including the following artists:

- Culture Musical Club
- Ikhwani Safaa Musical Club
- Bi Kidude
- Rajab Suleiman & Kithara
- Mlimani Park Orchestra
- International Orchestra Safari Sound
- Mbaraka Mwinshehe
- Jagwa Music
- Zein l'Abdin
- Zuhura Swaleh

== Selected publications ==
=== As editor ===
- Graebner, Werner, ed. (21 December 2023). Sokomoko: Popular Culture in East Africa. Brill. ISBN 978-90-04-65598-0.

=== As author ===
- Graebner, Werner (26 May 2020). "Between Mainland and Sea: The Taarab Music of Zanzibar". In Dawe, Kevin (ed.). Islands Music. Routledge. pp. 171–198. doi:10.4324/9781003085751. ISBN 978-1-00-308575-1.
- Graebner, Werner (2016). "Vol. VI Locations: Africa and the Middle East, Vol. XII Genres Sub-saharan Africa, Tanzania, Zanzibar, Comoros, Taarab". In Feldman, Heidi Carolyn; Horn, David; Shepherd, John; Kielich, Gabrielle (eds.). Bloomsbury Encyclopedia of Popular Music of the World. Continuum. doi:10.5040/9781501329180-0000456. ISBN 978-1-5013-2918-0.
- Twarab: a Comorian Music between two Worlds. Kabaro, revue internationale des Sciences de l’Homme et des Sociétés, 2004, Diversités et spécifcités des musiques traditionnelles de l’Océan Indien, II (2–3), pp. 41–66.
- "Ngoma ya Ukae". Competitive social structure in Tanzanian dance music songs. Mkuki na Nyota Publishers. 2000. pp. 295–318. ISBN 978-9976-973-82-2.
- The Swahili Coastal Sound. In: Simon Broughton, Mark Ellingham, with James McConnachie, and Orla Duane (Hrsg.): World Music, Vol. 1: Africa, Europe and the Middle East, Rough Guides Ltd, Penguin Books, 2000. ISBN 1-85828-636-0, S. 690–697.
- Tanzania – Popular Music: mtindo – dance with style. Rough Guides. 1999. pp. 681–689. ISBN 978-1-85828-635-8.
- Graebner, Werner (1989). "Whose music? The songs of Remmy Ongala and Orchestra Super Matimila". Popular Music. 8 (3): 243–258. doi:10.1017/S0261143000003548. ISSN 0261-1430.
