= Dhow Countries Music Academy =

Music school in Zanzibar, Tanzania

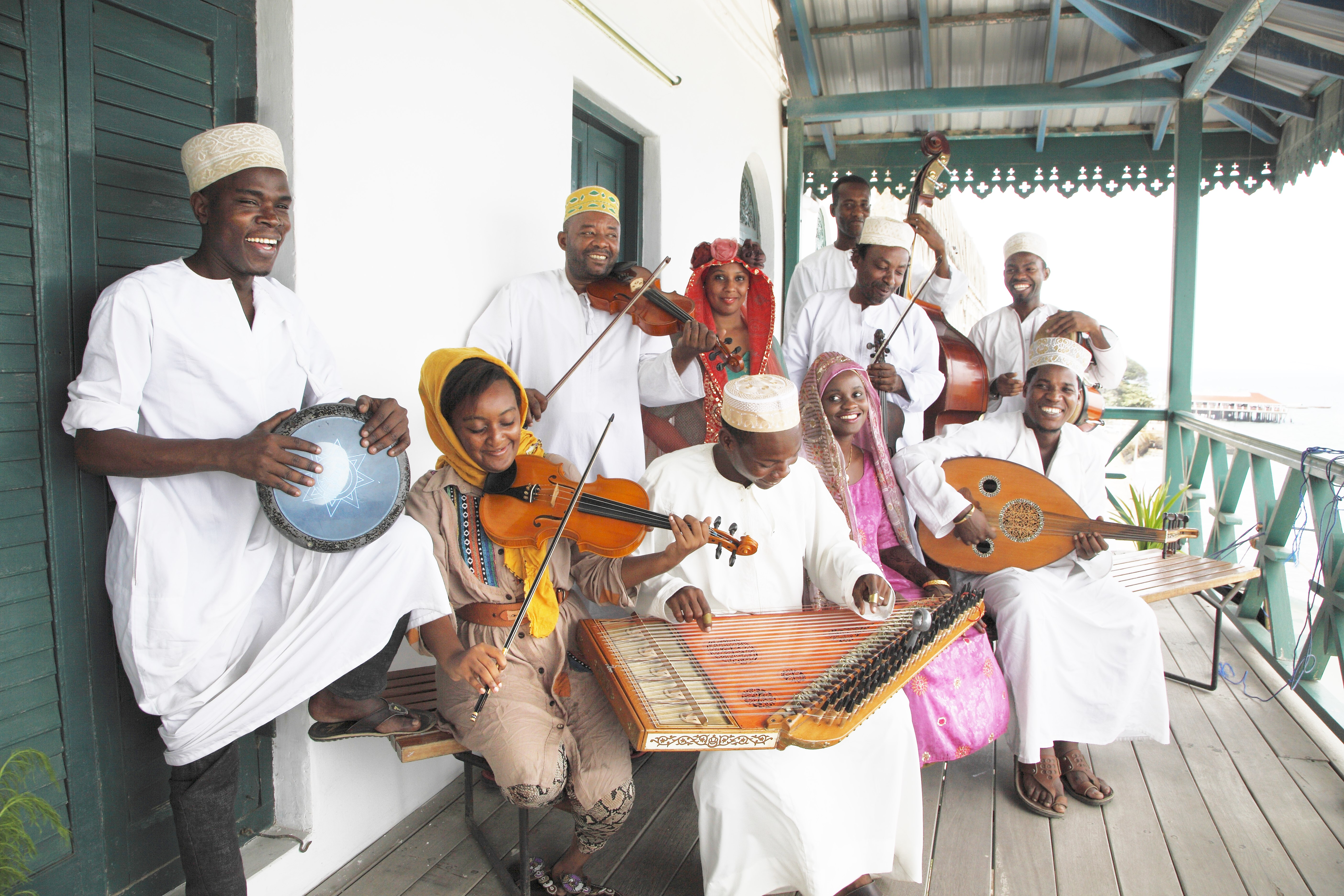
Taarab/Kidumbak Ensemble, 2015

The Dhow Countries Music Academy (DCMA) is a music school in Zanzibar, Tanzania, located in Vuga (Culture Music Club Building) in Stone Town. The academy promotes and preserves music heritage of the Dhow Region, that includes countries along the shores of the Indian Ocean and the Persian Gulf. Particular emphasis is being placed on teaching traditional music styles, such as Taarab, Kidumbaki or Ngoma.

"In recent years the Music Academy of the Tanzanian island has become an important meeting center of the dynamic local cultural scene."

== Aims ==
The academy was established in 2002 and throughout the years it has attracted more than 3000 students. DCMA is one of the prominent ambassadors of taarab music in the world. It has gained an international reputation for teaching traditional music. In 2007, Hildegard Kiel, DCMA's founding director was co-presented with the BBC World Music Award, acknowledging “her enormous contribution to revitalizing both Zanzibar’s musical heritage and the world music scene globally ”. In October 2010 DCMA won a Roskilde World Music Award for teaching traditional music.

In training the students it ensures the continuation, knowledge, and legacy of a unique musical cultural heritage. Dhow Countries Music Academy took its name from traditional sailing vessels, dhows, invented by Arabs, used in the Indian Ocean region. The Arabian Peninsula has a rich maritime history of trade and cultural exchange with East African coast. Dhows have been used in the region for centuries, and were key in developing fishing, pearl diving and trade industries as well as cultural exchange. DCMA is a major center for the teaching and performance of music traditions that travelled with the boats from Middle East to Africa through the Indian Ocean.

The mission of the Dhow Countries Music Academy is to play a key role in strengthening the music industry of Zanzibar and "Dhow Region" by researching, preserving, training, promoting and developing the musical heritage of Zanzibar and the „Dhow Countries“, both regionally and internationally. Before DCMA was established, traditional music in Zanzibar was close to be forgotten. There were only a couple of traditional taarab groups, and very few young people willing to keep the heritage. But since DCMA started its mission the situation has changed.

== Music education ==
The curriculum of DCMA offers music education from beginning to highly advanced levels. Certificate and diploma courses include courses in the music theory of the Swahili people and specifically the people of Zanzibar and the “Dhow Region”. Though specializing in traditional Arabic and African music styles of the region, DCMA also gives the opportunity to students to learn instruments used in Western music traditions.

Music studies at DCMA include:

1. Instrumental and vocal instruction through private and class lessons. These lessons focus on performance skills on various instruments including, but not limited to the violin, oud, qanun, guitar, bass, piano, keyboard, Arabic, African and Western drums, accordion and flute.
2. Certificate and diploma level courses in performance studies that also include courses in Western, Arabic and African musical traditions and ways of researching such traditions.

While the central aim of DCMA is to preserve and promote the musical heritage of Zanzibar and the "Dhow region", in more recent years it has introduced music-in-culture courses and special master classes, concerts and workshops with sound engineers, festival organizers from all over the world and professional musicians, i.e. Cleveland Watkiss, Oliver Mtukudzi, Ricardo Garcia, Blitz the Ambassador, Moussa Diallo, Harald Lassen, Florian Ross, Grzegorz Niemczuk, Leon Michael King, Piotr Damasiewicz, Derek Gripper, Makadem, and others.

Additionally, DCMA has provided seminars, exchange visits and networking activities throughout the year. One of these was the conference “Memory, Power and Knowledge in African Music and Beyond” in June 2015, presented in cooperation with the Universities of Ghana and Nigeria in West Africa and the Universities of Mainz and Hildesheim in Germany.

== Education for children ==
DCMA is providing free music lessons for more than 100 kids in 6 primary schools in Zanzibar. Learning music has many benefits for children. It fosters their academic, social, and emotional growth. It develops language skills. Studies have shown that those who undergo music education have better results in standardized tests than the norm. They also achieve higher grades in high school. Music education develops skills that are necessary in the workplace. DCMA is also helping children with various disabilities. Since 2012 DCMA is teaching in Kisiwadui Primary School a group of children with physical disabilities i.e. blindness, hearing problems or wheelchaired. This year the academy started to work with a local NGO Kahesa Zanzibar and is providing free music education to children with Down syndrome and autism.

== Outreach educational activities ==
In addition to its activities in Stone Town, Zanzibar, DCMA started a rural outreach program to respond to requests of rural communities to bring music education and music performance skills to more remote locations. This is especially true for those areas where small traditional instrument groups continue to exist and struggle to survive. Mahonda, a small village about 25 km outside of Stone Town, is a branch of the Dhow Countries Music Academy. DCMA activities in Mahonda are targeted to people who already have some skills in music, enabling them to pass on their knowledge to others on a continuous basis. Successful students are invited to study full-time at DCMA in Stonetown, which leads to certificates and diploma qualifications.

== Bands of DCMA ==
DCMA bands, students and teachers regularly visit Zanzibar and enrich the cultural life of Zanzibar through concerts and performances in clubs and restaurants, for example with Taarab and Afro Kabisa concerts, live Afro-fusion music including jazz, funk, afrobeat and bongo-flava. In addition, DCMA regularly organizes special concerts of international guest musicians and public Ngoma workshops. Some bands that have emerged from DCMA have gained international acclaim beyond Zanzibar:

- The Taarab / Kidumbak Ensemble represents the traditional music of East Africa, the instrumental and vocal styles of this fusion of Arabic, African and Indian music.
- Mapanya Band, founded in 2016, is one of the most promising young groups in Zanzibar and presents a blend of Afro-Fusion, Hip-Hop and Reggae.
- Siti and the Band, founded in 2015, as the singer and oud player Siti Amina, Rahma Ameir (violin) and Gora Mohammed (Qanun) decided to merge taarab music with their personal musical influences.
- Mcharuko is present in Zanzibar and Dar es Salaam since 2017, with a mix of African popular music styles directed by Christopher Anthony (jazz flute), with guitar, drums and vocals.
- The Afro Jazz Group, a blend of African, Arabic and Western styles.
- As well as the DCMA Ngoma Group, led by Zanzibar drummer legend Mzee Kheri.
- Waugwana Band
- Uwaridi Female Band
- Zan Ubuntu Band

== International performances ==
Since DCMA has been founded, several ensembles have presented themselves at festivals in Tanzania, other African countries and parts of the world. For example, every year DCMA's groups have been performing at Sauti za Busara Festival in Zanzibar. In 2005 the DCMA taarab group performed at the Mela Festival in France, in 2015 the same taarab ensemble performed at the Brave Festival in Wroclaw, Poland, at the Africa Festival in Würzburg, Germany, in 2016 at the Orient Festival, Tallinn, Estonia, to mention just a few of their international performances.
