= Culture Musical Club =

Musical group from Zanzibar

- Origin: Zanzibar, Tanzania
- Genres: Taarab
- Years active: 1958–present
- Labels: Virgin Records, Independent
- Spinoffs: Kidumbak groups

Culture Musical Club is an East African musical band based in Stone Town, Zanzibar. Regarded as one of the island's oldest and well-known musical ensembles, it has been known both for preserving and innovating Swahili coastal musical traditions since its founding in 1958.

With albums on international labels and invitations to world music festivals, the group has toured across Europe, North America, Japan and beyond.

== History and career ==
Culture Musical Club originated in 1958 as part of the youth wing of the Afro‑Shirazi Party during Zanzibar’s independence movement. From its early days, the ensemble developed a distinct local taarab style, regularly composing and performing new works, along with traditional ones. Although primarily based in Zanzibar Town, the group also has toured rural regions, bringing their music to remote audiences by using a portable stage and generator. Rehearsals and performances at their clubhouse in the Vuga neighborhood of Stone Town have become tourist attractions.

=== Musical styles ===
Culture Musical Club, which is the largest taarab club with up to 45 musicians, blends traditional and contemporary elements of taarab with drum-based kidumbaki rhythms: The larger setup usually consists of three violins, qanun, oud, two accordions, double bass, dumbak, bongos, rika, male or female lead singers, and a female chorus. The smaller kidumbaki groups, made up by some of the musicians, feature a slimmer lineup of violins, sanduku (tea‑chest bass), two kidumbaki drums, cherewa (maracas) and mkwasa (claves), a female chorus and dancers, creating upbeat, percussive music usually heard at weddings and celebrations.

=== Collaborations ===
In 1988 Culture Musical Club began releasing albums on international labels. The band has performed in major national and international engagements: In Zanzibar, they have performed with veteran singer Bi Kidude at the annual Sauti za Busara festival. Abroad, they have been invited to world music festivals, including Womad (UK), Heimatklänge (Germany), Musiques Métisses (France), Sfinks (Belgium), and the Chicago World Music Festival. Further, they have collaborated with American blues musician Taj Mahal on the album Mkutano Meets the Culture Musical Club of Zanzibar, blending taarab with blues motifs.

== Reception ==
Reviews of their concerts have appeared in The New York Times, The Guardian and The Mail & Guardian. The BBC published a podcast about music from Zanzibar, featuring Culture Musical Club and Bi Kidude.

== Selected discography ==
- The Music of Zanzibar (Globestyle, 1988)
- Spices of Zanzibar (Network Medien, 1996)
- Bashraf (Dizim, 2000)
- Waridi: Parfums de Zanzibar (Virgin, 2004)
- Mkutano Meets the Culture Musical Club of Zanzibar (Tradition & Moderne, 2005)
- Shime! (World Village, 2009)

== See also ==
- Music of Tanzania
- Dhow Countries Music Academy
