= Kanga (garment) =

Printed cotton fabric worn in East Africa

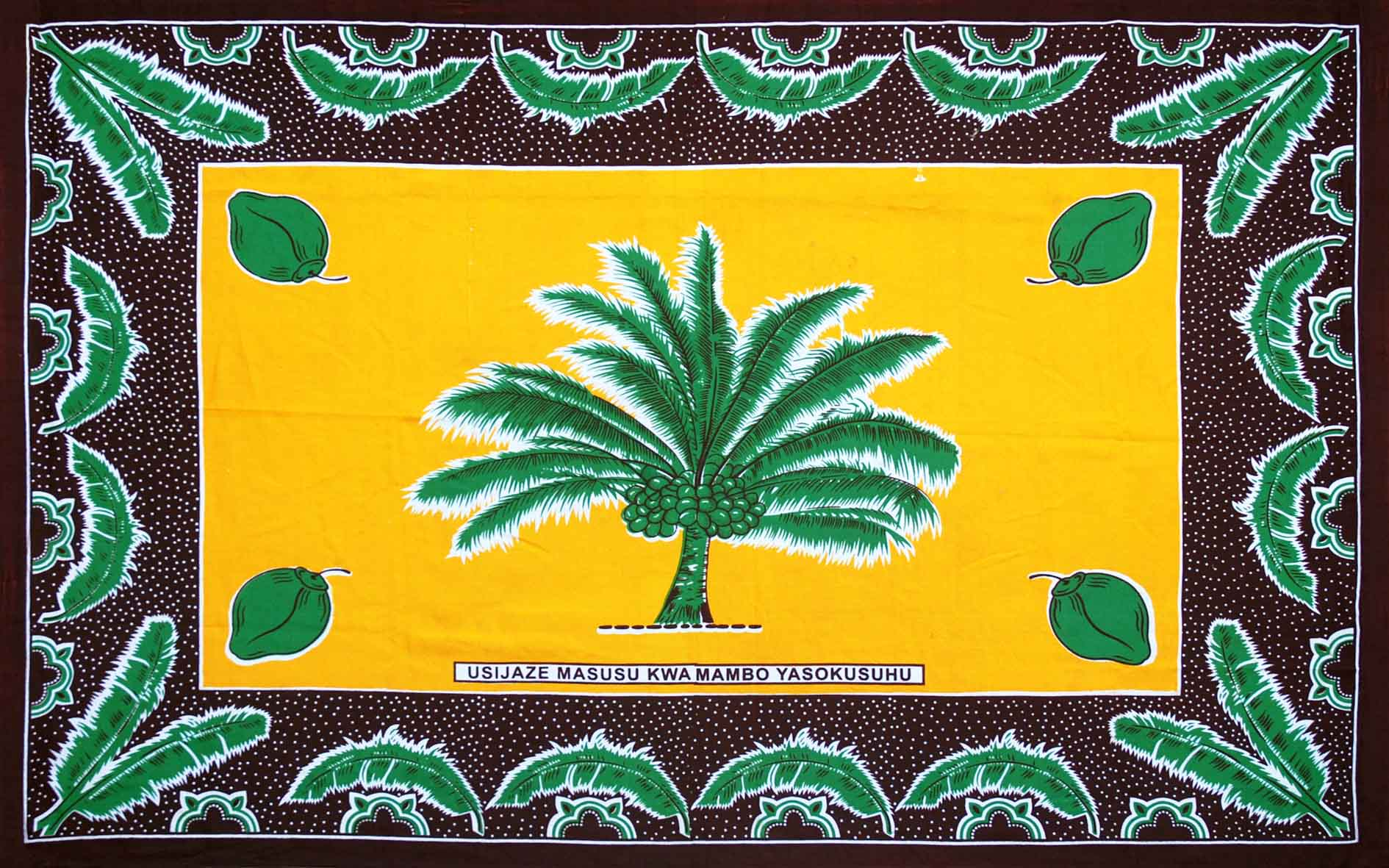
Kanga (Tanzania, 2011) The jina of this kanga is Usijaze masusu kwa mambo yasokusuhu "Do not fill your mind with things that do not concern you" or "Do not get involved in matters that do not concern you"

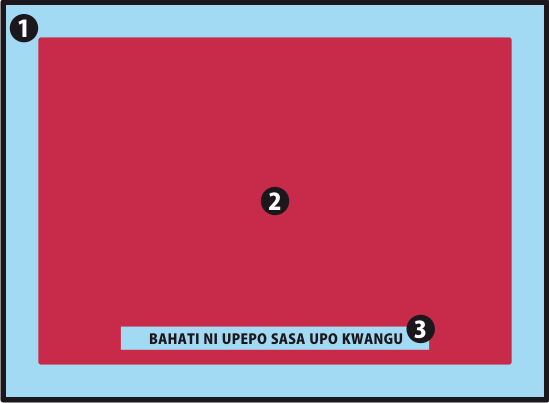
A simplified illustration of kanga. (1) pindo; (2) mji; (3) jina. The jina of this kanga is Bahati ni upepo sasa upo kwangu, which can be translated as "Luck is like the (blowing of the) wind, now it is on my side"

The kanga (in some areas known as leso) is a colourful fabric similar to kitenge, but lighter, worn by women and occasionally by men throughout the African Great Lakes region. It is a piece of printed cotton fabric, about 1.5 m by 1 m, often with a border along all four sides (called pindo in Swahili), and a central part (mji) which differs in design from the borders. They are sold in pairs, which can then be cut and hemmed to be used as a set.

== Origins ==
Kangas have been a traditional type of dress amongst women in East Africa since the 19th century.

=== Merikani ===
According to some sources, it was developed from a type of unbleached cotton cloth imported from the US. The cloth was known as merikani in Zanzibar, a Swahili noun derived from the adjective American (indicative of the place it originated). Male slaves wrapped it around their waist and female slaves wrapped it under their armpits. To make the cloth more feminine, slave women occasionally dyed them black or dark blue, using locally obtained indigo. This dyed merikani was referred to as kaniki. People despised kaniki due to its association with slavery. Ex-slave women seeking to become part of the Swahili society began to decorate their merikani clothes. They did this using one of three techniques; a form of resist dying, a form of block printing or hand painting. After slavery was abolished in 1897, Kangas began to be used for self-empowerment and to indicate that the wearer had personal wealth.

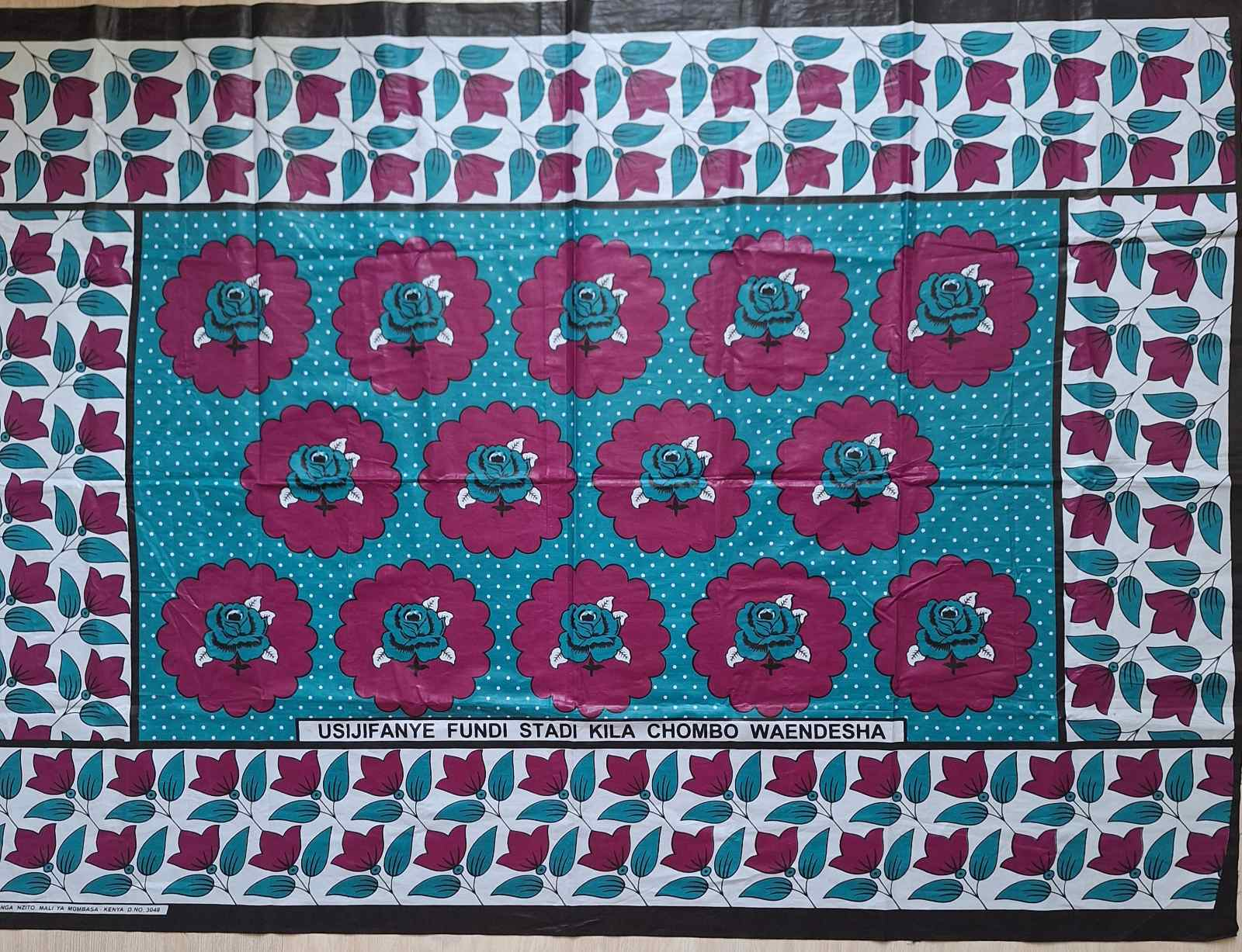
Kanga (leso) garment from Kenya with a Swahili proverb on it

=== Lenços ===
According to other sources, the origin is in the kerchief squares called lencos brought by Portuguese traders from India and Arabia. Stylish ladies in Zanzibar and Mombasa, started to use them stitching together six kerchiefs in a 3X2 pattern to create one large rectangular wrap. Soon they became popular in the whole coastal region, later expanding inland to the Great Lakes region. They are still known as lesos or lessos in some localities, after the Portuguese word.

=== Manufacture ===
Until the mid-twentieth century, they were mostly designed and printed in India, the Far East and Europe. Since the 1950s kangas started to be printed also in the city of Morogoro in Tanzania (MeTL Group Textile Company) and Kenya (Rivatex and Thika Cloth Mills Ltd are some of the largest manufacturers in Kenya) and other countries on the African continent.

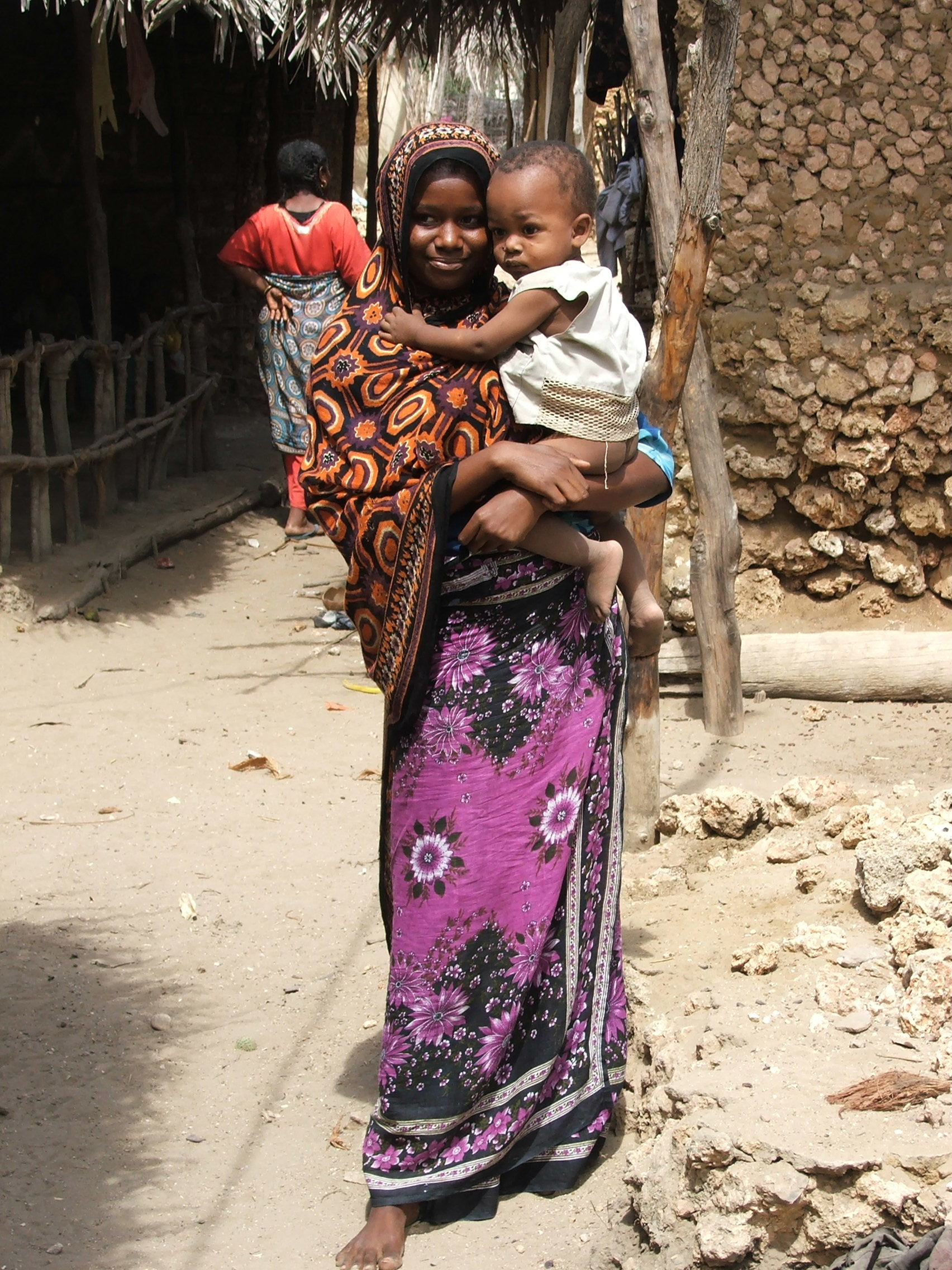
A woman wearing kanga in Siyu on Pate Island, Kenya.

=== Proverbs ===
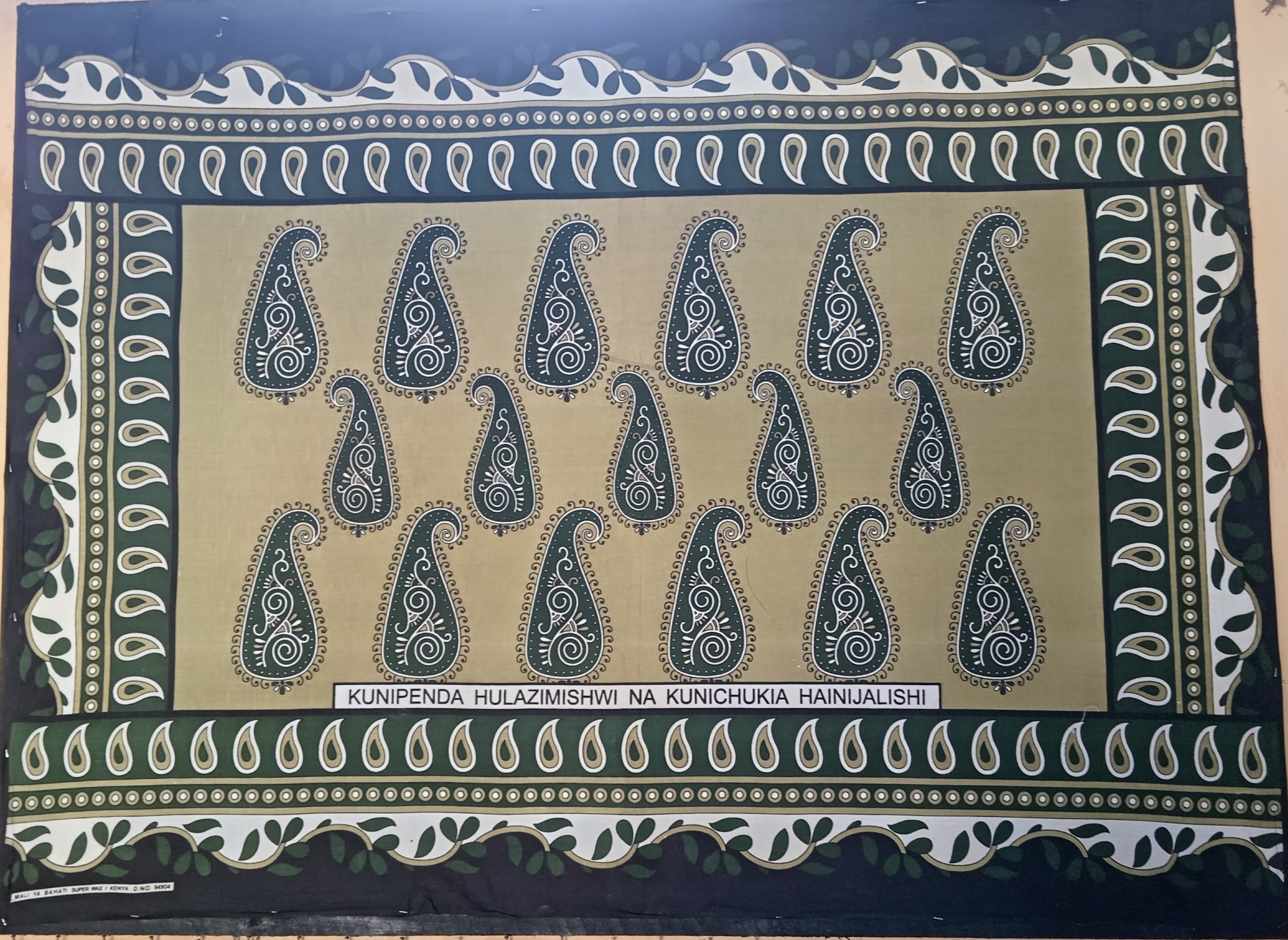
Swahili Proverb

In the early 1900s, proverbs, sayings, aphorisms and slogans were added to kangas. A trader in Mombasa, Kaderdina Hajee Essak, also known as "Abdulla", began to distinguish his kangas with the mark "K.H.E. - Mali ya Abdulla", to which he often added a proverb in Swahili. Initially they were printed in Arabic script, and later in Roman letters. Towards the eastern part of the region, phrases in Kiswahili are traditional, while in central areas phrases in both Kiswahili and Lingala are popular.

== Appearance ==
- Generally Kangas are 150 cm wide by 110 cm long.
- They are rectangular and always have a border along all four sides.
- Often kangas have a central symbol.
- Most modern kangas bear a saying, usually in Kiswahili.

== Kanga Wear Designs ==
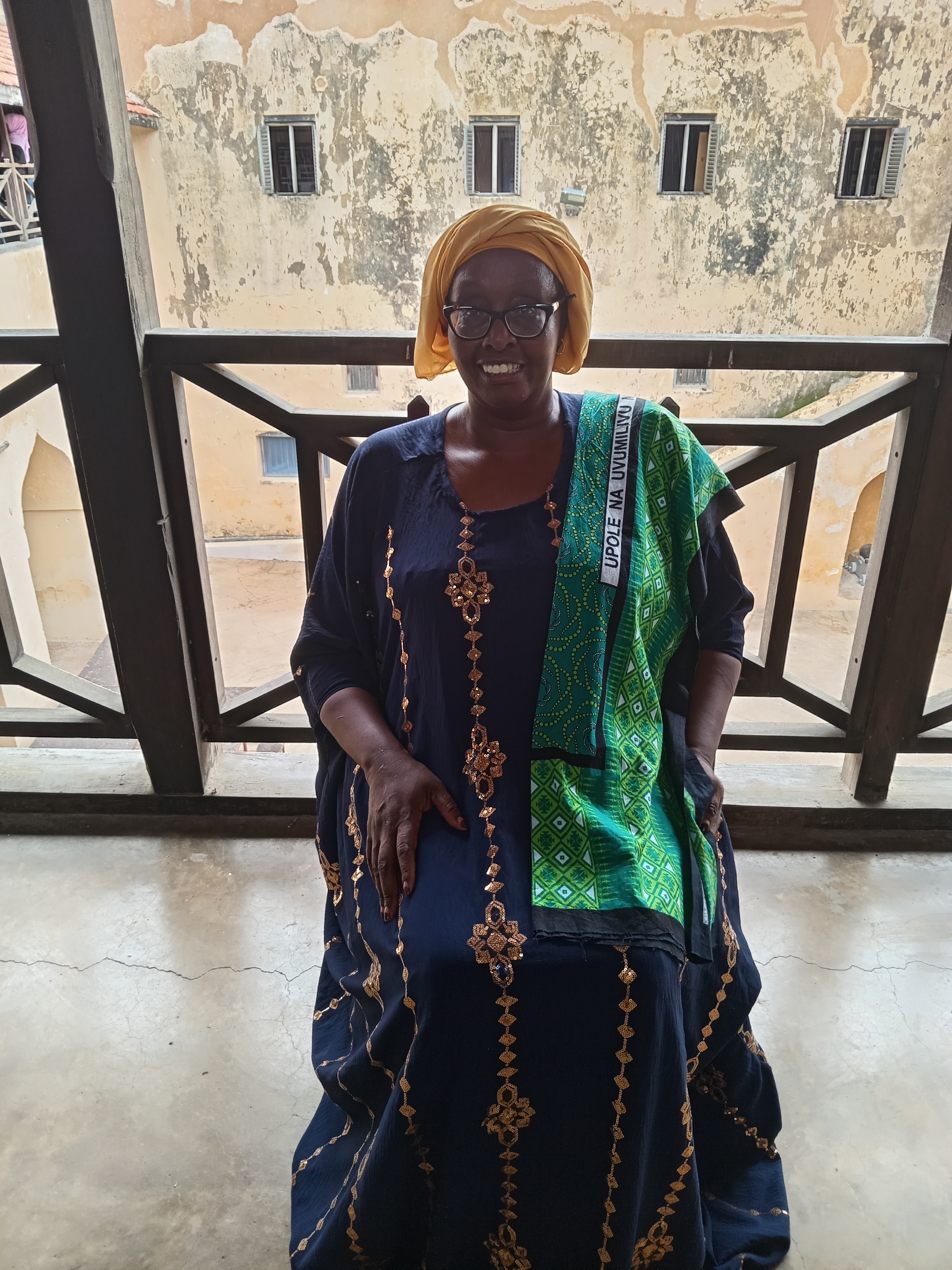
Kanga wear design

There are many different ways to wear kangas. One traditional way of wearing the kanga is to wrap one piece as a shawl, to cover the head and shoulders, and another piece wrapped around the waist. Kangas are also used as baby carriers. It can also be used by women for the Swahili traditional dance chakacha.

== Kanga Uses ==
Whereas kitenge is a more formal fabric used for nice clothing, the kanga is much more than a clothing piece, it can be used as a skirt, head-wrap, apron, pot-holder, towel, and much more. The kanga is culturally significant on Eastern coast of Africa, often given as a gift for birthdays or other special occasions. They are also given to mourning families in Tanzania after the loss of a family member as part of a michengo (or collection) into which many community members put a bit of money to support the family in their grief. Kangas are also similar to Kishutu and Kikoy which are traditionally worn by men. The Kishutu is one of the earliest known designs, probably named after a town in Tanzania, they are particular given to young brides as part of their dowry or by healers to cast off evil spirits. Due to its ritual function they do not always include a proverb.

The earliest pattern of the kanga was patterned with small dots or speckles, which look like the plumage of the guinea hen, also called "kanga" in Swahili. This is where the name comes from, contrary to the belief that it comes from a Swahili verb for to close.

=== Communication vehicle ===
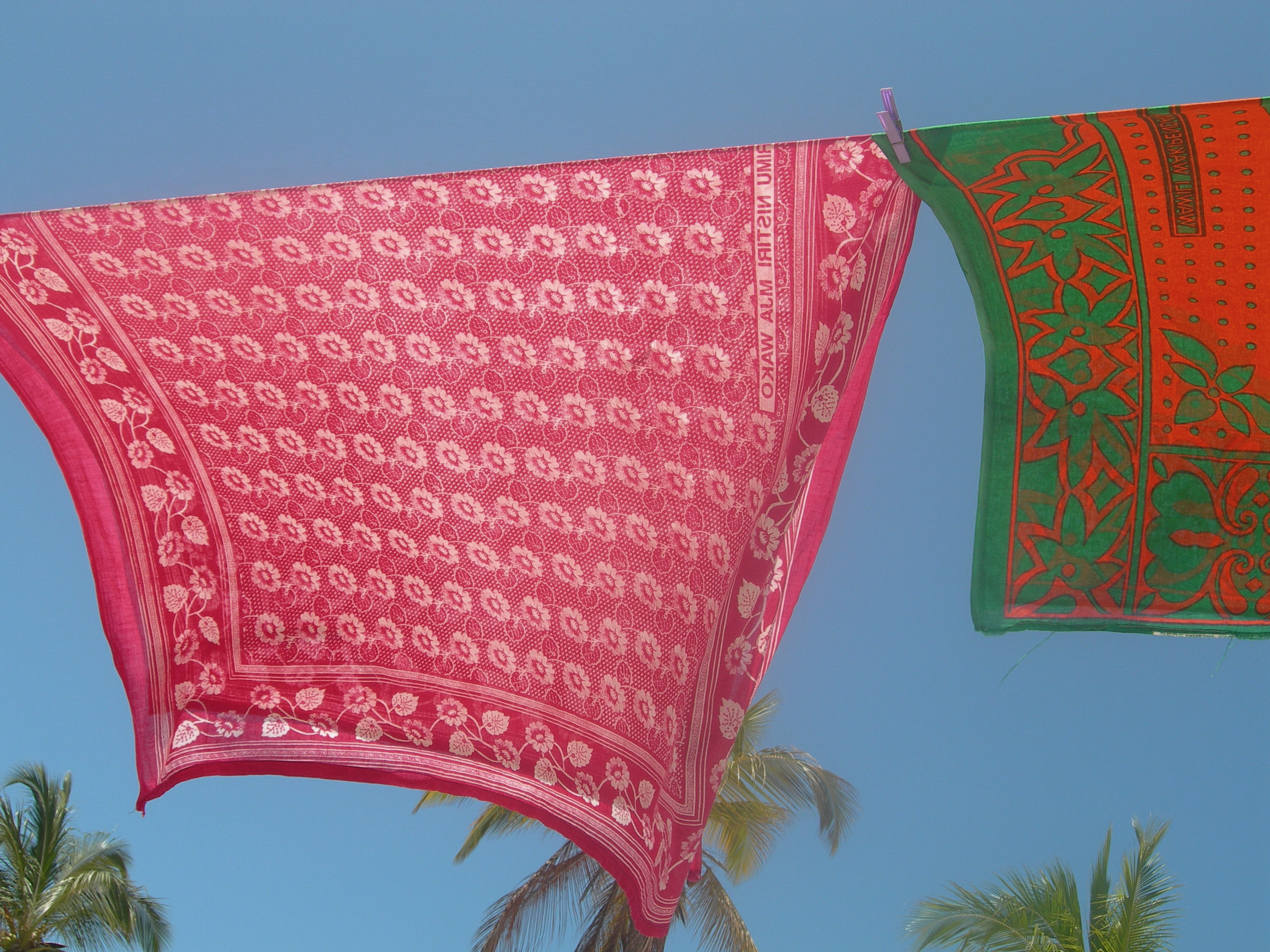
Kangas drying on a line in Paje, Zanzibar, Tanzania

Typically, kangas consist of three parts: The pindo (wide border), the mji (central motif), Ujumbe or jina (the Kiswahili) is featured on a strip which contains a message. It is less commonly written in Arabic or Comorian. Other countries which produce their own Kangas write the Kanga messages/names in their main languages: in Madagascar (Malagasy Republic) where they are known as lambas, they feature ohabolana, traditional proverbs written in Malagasy; they are also produced in Zambia and Malawi. This message is called the jina (literally 'name') of the kanga. Messages are often in the form of riddles or proverbs. When giving a kanga as a gift, one must be mindful of the proverb, as they can be somewhat insulting. Occasionally, one of these is given as a gift at a wedding to express a person's opinion that the couple should not be married. However, most of the messages express kind sentiments and good wishes. Some examples of proverbs:

- Majivuno hayafai: Greed is never useful
- Mkipendana mambo huwa sawa: Everything is all right if you love each other
- Japo sipati tamaa sikati: Even though I have nothing, I have not given up my desire to get what I want
- Wazazi ni dhahabu kuwatunza ni thawabu: Parents are gold; to take care of them is a blessing
- Sisi sote abiria dereva ni Mungu: We are all passengers, God is the driver
- Fimbo La Mnyonge Halina Nguvu: Might is right. (lit. "the weak stick has no power")
- Mwanamke mazingira tuanataka, usawa, amani, maendelo: We (women) want equality, peace, and progress
- Naogopa simba na meno yake siogopi mtu kwa maneno yake: I'm afraid of a lion with its strong teeth but not a man with his words (lyrics).
- Leo ni siku ya shangwe na vigelegele: Today is a day for celebrations and ululations.
- Mchungulia bahari si msafiri: One who only looks at the sea is not a sailor.

=== Political Vehicle ===
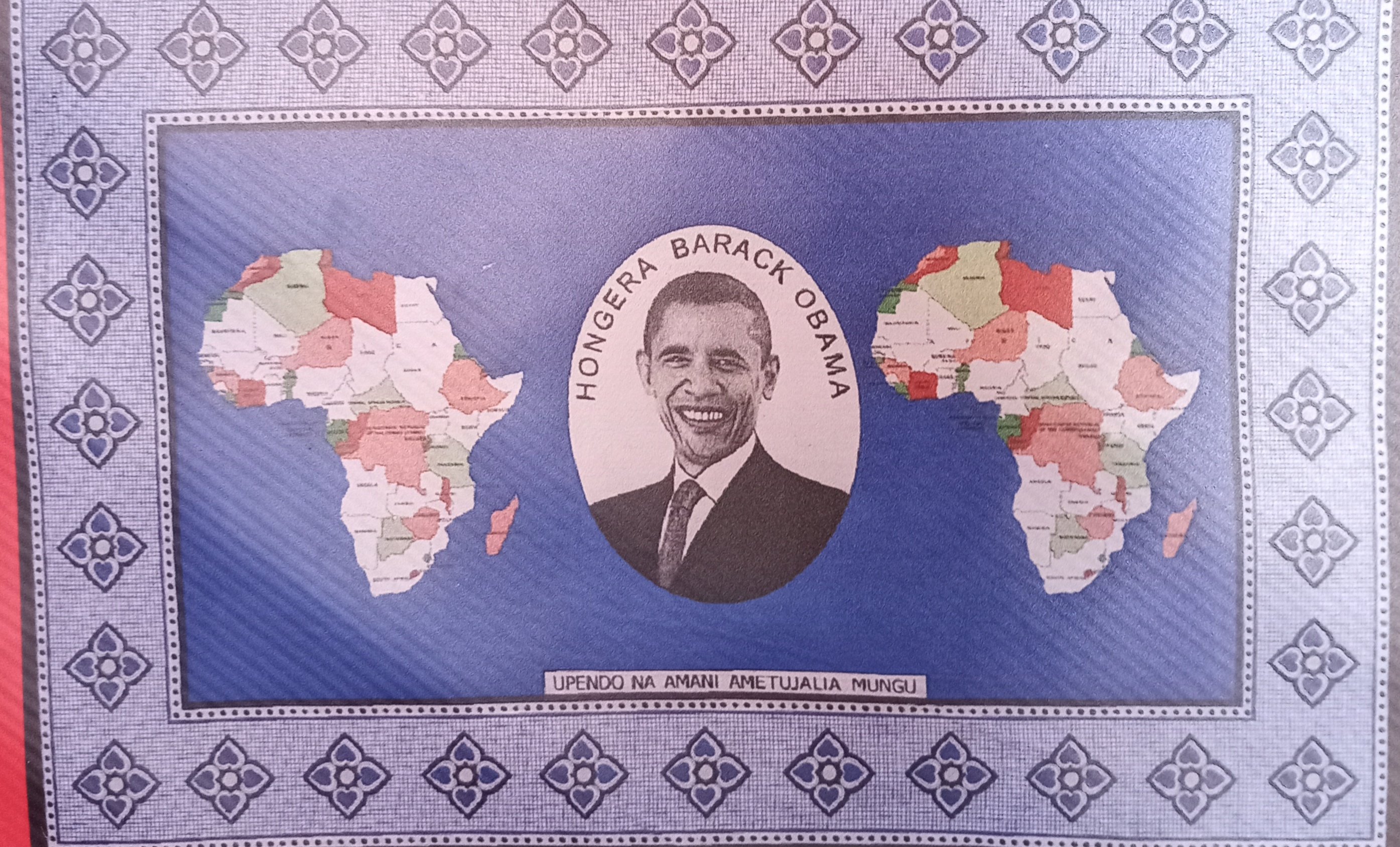
Former USA President on a Kanga

Kanga can also be used to send political messages, mostly used during the campaign time Women will wear a specific Kanga to communicate a non-verbal message to their community. This form of communication, often between women can be about personal feeling, relationship, politics, education, health, or religion.

== See also ==
- Capulana

== Literature ==
- Beck, Rose-Marie (2001). 'Ambiguous signs: the role of the 'kanga' as a medium of communication', Afrikanistische Arbeitspapiere, 68, 157–169.
- Erie Art Museum. "Kanga & Kitenge: Cloth and Culture in East Africa"
- Hanby, Jeanette & David Bygott, (2006) 'Kangas - 101 Uses', HariaStamp Publishers, ISBN 9966-7146-0-X
- Hongoke, Christine J. (1993) The effects of Khanga inscription as a communication vehicle in Tanzania, Research report, 19. Dar es Salaam: Women's Research and Documentation Project.
- Linnebuhr, E. (1992) 'Kanga: popular cloths with messages', in Werner Graebner (ed.) Sokomoko: Popular Culture in East Africa (Matatu vol. 9). Rodopi, 81–90.
- Parkin, David (2004) 'Textile as commodity, dress as text: Swahili kanga and women's statements', in Ruth Barnes (ed.) Textiles in Indian Ocean Societies. London/New York: Routledge, 47–67.
- Yahya-Othman, Saida (1997) 'If the cap fits: 'kanga' names and women's voice in Swahili society', Afrikanistische Arbeitspapiere, 51, 135–149.
- Kahabi, CM. (2010) Kanga and Vitenge in Remanufactured Fashion; University of Manchester.
