= Unyago =

Music genre and type of dance

In Swahili culture, most notably in Zanzibar and in some areas of western Kenya, the word unyago refers both to a set of rituals and to the music and dance styles that are traditionally associated with such rituals.

The unyago rituals were practiced to celebrate the coming of age of girls before or during weddings. In those rituals, older women would teach the young ones about sex and conjugal life. These rituals would last several days and be accompanied by dances and music.

In modern East Africa, unyago rituals are still occasionally practiced, but unyago dances and music are also performed independent of such rituals, as part of local folk music. Bi Kidude and Bi Ngwali are two well-known Zanzibari singers who occasionally have performed unyago music.
