= Siti binti Saad =

Tanzanian singer (1880–1950)

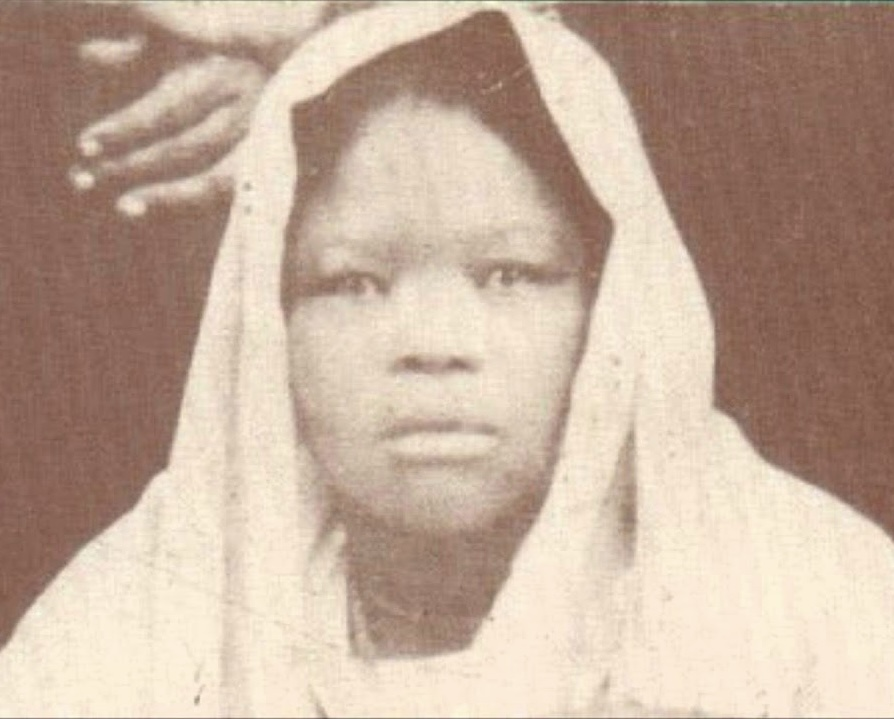
- Siti binti Saad c.1930s

Background information
- Born: Mtumwa Siti Binti Saad c. 1880; Fumba, Magharibi District, Mjini Mgaharibi Region, Sultanate of Zanzibar (modern day Tanzania)
- Origin: Tabora Region & Tanga Region, Tanzania
- Died: August 1950 (aged 69–70)
- Genres: Taarab
- Occupation: Musician
- Instrument: Vocalist
- Label: Columbia Records
- Formerly of: Nadi Ikhwani Safa

Siti binti Saad (c.1880– August 1950) was a pioneering Tanzanian musician in the taarab musical style. Through her music she was also an anti-colonial activist, feminist and Swahili cultural icon of 20th century. She produced over 250 phonograph records throughout her lifetime, becoming the first East African vocalist to release commercial recordings in the 1920s and 1930s. She also added a brand-new dance and pantomime component to taarab music called "natiki," which was inspired by Indian dance. She was a trailblazer as a female performer in the genre during a time when men artists controlled the industry. She performed in a variety of languages, but most significantly in Swahili, in contrast to earlier vocalists who solely sang in Arabic. She sang in cities of the coast of Tanganyika and Zanzibar.

Her musical career peaked between 1928 and 1939, but she continued to perform until her death in 1950. More female performers started appearing in the previously all-male singing clubs after she died. Taarab began to be performed more frequently in Swahili than in Arabic.

== Early life ==
Siti binti Saad was born into slavery in the village of Fumba, Zanzibar sometime around the year 1880. Her given name, Mtumwa, which translates to "slave" or "servant," emphasizes the lowly position into which she was born.

Her father, Saadi, was a Nyamwezi of Tabora, and her mother was from the Zigua of Tanga. Both parents were born in Zanzibar to enslaved families, and they worked on clove plantations and in the creation of fine pottery. Siti disappointed her parents by not being able to master pottery like her mother, but she sold her mother's work in their town. Zanzibar's population was thought to be made up of roughly three-fourths slaves or recently manumitted slaves in 1895, the majority of whom worked on clove plantations owned by the island's Omani (Wamanga, in Swahili) elite.

Following the passing of an abolition law in Zanzibar in 1897, freed slaves progressively ceased to be considered socially dependent individuals and started to call for acceptance into island society as autonomous individuals. Siti's personal life story echoes many of the most significant changes that took place at this time.

== Early career ==
Mtumwa binti Saadi relocated to Zanzibar Town in 1911, fourteen years after the abolition of slavery, in quest of better employment possibilities, more personal freedom, and a place to start over in life. Siti relocated to a section of the town known as Ng'ambo (literally, "the other side"in Swahili), which was formerly the neighborhood of the urban enslaved and was separated from Stone Town, where the lavish stone homes of the Arab, Asian, and European ruling families were situated, by a tidal creek. The population of Ng'ambo more than doubled between 1890 and 1930 as tens of thousands of people, including Siti, left the rural plantations and relocated to the city. Mtumwa binti Saadi, however, left the rural plantations and settled in a town.

Mtumwa binti Saadi and others quickly learned, however, that despite the town's limited chances for increased autonomy, prior systems of class, ethnic, and gender oppression continued to shape their lives fundamentally. Siti's reputation as a performer started to spread throughout Ng'ambo during World War I. Her ability to portray the joys and tragedies of daily life in Ng' ambo through song, as well as her determination to use her performance to denounce acts of injustice that her friends and neighbors were exposed to, were the foundations of her success. The gossip and arguments happening in the neighborhood where Siti and the other band members lived, worked, and played often found their way into songs. Both the music of Siti's band and the daily lives of the people of Ng'ambo were replete with poverty, the conceited superiority of the ruling class, and the abuses of British colonial tribunals.

Although written versions of Siti's life history frequently portray her as transcending her impoverished background—an icon reflecting the realised hopes of an entire generation—while she is widely hailed by her contemporaries for never forgetting where she came from, Mtumwa, the daughter of rural slaves, rose to fame in the 1920s under the name "Siti" which has a double meaning of both "lady" and "fife/whistle". She frequently sang religious and secular songs at the weddings and festivals of the prominent families of Swahili coast of Tanzania during this time, which helped her become well-known outside of Ng'ambo. No ceremony was judged successful, be it a wedding or the celebration of a birth, among Zanzibar's elite, without Siti's performance, according to one author. They received many invitations, especially from the Sultan and the Omani Arab elites, and to perform at various weddings and other celebrations.

Since at that time, education for female children wasn't taken seriously, Siti wasn't able to go to school or attend Madarasa Koranic studies. She had the fortune to meet a member of the taarab group Nadi Ikhwani Safa named Ali Muhsin. At that time, Nadi Ikhwani Safa was the only taarab group founded by Sultan Barghash bin Said of Zanzibar, who loved comfort and luxury. It was an all-male group, as it was seen as indecent for women to join musical groups. Lord Muhsin volunteered to teach Siti to sing, accompanying musical instruments, and Arabic. He then introduced her to the other members of Nadi Ikhwani Safa who without hesitation began to organize various performances for her in the community.

Although the Zanzibari aristocracy may have perceived her role at these festivities as that of the singing slave girl, in the written folklore she is praised for mixing with the most prominent figures in Swahili culture. Most Ng'ambo community members' financial incentives for these performances were much beyond their expectations. She got gifts of silks, embroidered clothing, and gold jewellery, and the payment she received for one performance for these affluent guests was more than what the average urban worker would make in a year.

== Recordings ==
Siti's inclusion in the elite and her increasing riches exemplified the era's capacity for change. When she was selected in 1928 to be the first artist from East Africa to make a phonograph recording, her stature as a cultural icon was furthered. Up until the late 1920s, the only commercial recordings offered in East Africa were in Middle Eastern, European, and Indian languages. The Gramophone Company delegated responsibility for the growth of the East African market to its Bombay branch. Asian local dealers were chosen to represent, sell, and promote both gramophones and phonograph discs.

Abdulkarim Hakim Khan, His Master's Voice representative in Zanzibar, encouraged the firm to risk on the creation of Kiswahili records in 1928 and arranged for Siti and the other band members Budda Swedi, Maalim Shaaban, and Mbaruk Alsam to fly to Bombay to record. In the following several years, albums targeted at hitherto untapped markets were promoted globally as international recording corporations began to cautiously recognise the potential purchasing power of black listeners.

Overwhelmed by their initial success—especially in light of the pitiful Rs 64 (roughly TZS 100 at the time) that had been spent to advertise and promote these first recordings—His Master's Voice invited Siti and her band back to Bombay for another session in March 1929. The 56 songs (28 records) from Siti's first session sold over 23,000 copies by 1931. The group recorded 98 more songs during this second tour, which went on to sell 40,666 copies over the following two years. Other recording firms decided to imitate His Master's Voice's explosive growth in East Africa in terms of both sales and earnings.

His Master's Voice, Odeon, Columbia, and Pathe had all begun recording in East Africa by 1930. Although the downturn and increased competition caused His Master's Voice's sales to decline significantly in 1931, by mid-1931 they had sold over 72,000 records in East Africa, the vast majority of which were recordings by Siti binti Saadi and a few other Taarab performers. Given that Kiswahili is and has always been the most commonly spoken language in East Africa, it seems logical from a marketing perspective that the choice to make music recorded in that language was made. But as Wemer Graebner has claimed, colonial administrators and missionaries in East Africa, who promoted Swahili taarab as a more "developed" and "civilised" kind of music, also had a significant impact on the practises of business executives.

Over 250 songs were recorded by Siti and her band for various labels. Unsurprisingly, not all of her songs were memorable, and not all of her best songs were recorded. One hundred of these song texts were analysed, and the results showed that 20% of the band's songs dealt with social and cultural issues, 2% with religion, and 60% with love-related themes. Siti's sharp criticisms of local class and gender issues made up less than a quarter of her published works, yet they are the ones for which she is most known. There are no company records that would shed more light on the specifics of what was recorded, how the content was chosen, or whether it was subject to censorship by the firm or colonial authority.

The newly formed business, EMI, sent a representative to East Africa to look into the current situation and potential futures of gramophone promotion following the merger of His Master's Voice, Odeon, Pathe, and Columbia in 1931. The agency suggested a continuous focus on Swahili recording in his report. Siti did record some songs in Arabic, but her Swahili songs received the greatest praise. Although only the relatively well-to-do could afford to buy records, her popularity spread among East Africans of all social classes, and her records played an important role in making taarab music accessible to the general public.

Siti succeeded in elevating the status of Kiswahili and, by extension, Kiswahili speakers, by recording in the language. One man who frequently visited Siti's family when he was a young man said that these recordings stood for "The importance of Swahili as one of the most advanced African languages." He and many other Zanzibaris saw Siti's records as proof that European and Asian cultures saw them as civilised individuals, which was a major accomplishment in the colonial era of the 1930s.

== Swahili cultural icon ==
Although Siti binti Saadi's music has received praise from both oral and written sources, there are noteworthy contrasts in the focus placed on it in the two written sources. All of them emphasise the importance of her recordings, frequently designating the time when she signed her contract with His Master's Voice as the pinnacle of her career. The well-known Swahili poet Shaaban Robert described her songs as "the pride of East Africa" and her recordings as "a great light in the darkness" left for future generations. These authors note that the act of recording has the power to preserve spoken words because they are fleeting. They also gave Siti a power as a creator that oral sources did not since they were imbued with the idea of authorship authority that frequently comes with literacy.

Many of these authors also praised Siti's records for serving as middlemen for Zanzibar's cultural imperialism. The commercial selling of Siti's voice contributed to the development of the Zanzibari dialect of Kiswahili, which the British later promoted as "standard" Swahili throughout East Africa. Some people praised these recordings for "helping the Swahili language grow [in a way that] can never be matched." Others asserted that the creation of these recordings contributed to educating East Africans about the culture of Zanzibar and its significance on a global scale. The 1956 biography by Shaaban Robert proclaimed the significance of Siti and, consequently, Zanzibar.

Shaaban's argument was supported by other authors who claimed that "once this voice was heard coming from a gramophone everyone started singing the songs, children, elders, women, and men, everyone was sining Even beni bands started to copy Taarab songs."This author suggests that taarab became a musical language franca that other peoples immediately aspired to acquire through the commercial production of Siti's music.

Outside of Zanzibar and even there, Swahili speakers opposed attempts to define the Swahili music for them by comparison. Taarab was a fine type of music, but other Bantu musical genres were still played and were well-liked. However, commercial taarab manufacturing did frequently assist to enhance local perceptions of Zanzibar's role as a leader in the Swahili social scene. Siti's recorded voice served as a metaphor for Zanzibar's influence as a modernising force that disseminated taarab music and new technology from Tanganyika to Southern Arabia, Uganda, Kenya, the Belgian Congo, and Somalia. The old proverb "When the pipes play in Zanzibar, they dance on the lakes" has fresh meaning thanks to Siti's albums, which have brought Zanzibar back to its previous splendour.

Older men and women spoke highly of Siti's music in their speeches. However, rather than focusing on professionally made versions, they emphasised the value of her live performances. The majority of Zanzibaris lived in households that couldn't afford a gramophone, let alone the new records that were released on a monthly basis and whose average price was more than twice that of an unskilled urban labourer. The fact that "one of their own" (i.e. poor, black, and Kiswahili speaking) had been recorded rather than one of the bands from Stonetown that sung in Arabic, the language of the island's despised aristocracy, elevated the stature of even those without a gramophone.

In the 1920s and 1930s, Siti's residence in Ng'ambo became into a hub of activity where she joked, swapped rumours, assessed local politics, and gathered new lyrics for her songs. The band's rehearsals were public affairs. Siti and the other band members wrote the poetry that made up the songs' lyrics, but they did it after soliciting input from the attendees from the local community. Oral sources claim that creation was not a private act, but a communal and collaborative one. Not in the act of recording, where Siti was given exclusive credit as author, but rather in the context of its creation, a process in which everyone participated, was where her music's power lay.

== Anti-colonial activism ==
Siti's songs that people have remembered over the past 50 years are either those that echo significant personal experiences or significant events for the Ng'ambo community as a whole. There were many places where the urban poor and the forces of colonial power clashed, but the courts and jails were two of the more volatile flashpoints. Crowds of incensed locals frequently freed neighbours from jail or put a raucous end to court hearings from the 1920s to the 1950s. Residents of Ng'ambo claim that colonial "justice" disregarded the needs of the poor. The interests of the impoverished could only be safeguarded via collective action and advocacy on their behalf.

Although vocal requests for "fairness" from the colonial government frequently met with resistance, community discussions of what "justice" meant also found expression in jailbreaks and in Siti's band's music. Numerous of these songs are still well-remembered today, and when they are performed, they frequently serve to reaffirm memories of the bloody conflicts that pitted the African poor against Asian and Arab landowners as well as the colonial government. The conviction of Mselem bin Mohamed el-Khalasi, a wealthy and influential Arab civil official headquartered in Zanzibar Town, was satirically "honoured" in one of Siti's songs, Wala Hapana Hasara. Mselem was well-known for abusing his position by tricking and taking advantage of the underprivileged. During a particularly turbulent time in the late 1920s, when Ng'ambo people organised a ground rent strike that led to multiple conflicts with the state, he was also despised for his role as a government informant.

When Mselem was later found guilty of stealing money from government accounts in order to pay for his daughter's wedding, many in Ng'ambo believed that God was atoning for the wrongs that he had done against them over the years. For years, Mselem had stolen the property of Zanzibar's poor and illiterate. Siti played this song in memory of Mselem's demise after he was condemned to hard labour in the town's rock quarry. The song gained so much traction that a kanga (cloth worn by coastal ladies), with the name "Mselem's Rock," was printed and featured a picture of Mselem carrying a rock on his head.

Hard labour was imposed on Mselem in a rare occasion where native and colonial ideas of justice came to converge. The affluent man, whose parents could buy him out, got off more frequently, said one man, "while the poor man went to jail." Court records from these decades have been analysed, and it shows that women were more likely than men to have lawsuits decided against them. Women were routinely advised by European court authorities that their own immoral behaviour was the root of their issues in cases of rape and domestic abuse.

=== Feminism ===
Many of Siti's songs mirrored the observations of Ng'ambo locals on the resolution of such incidents. The women's taarab group Sahib el-Any occasionally still performs "Kijiti," one of these well-remembered songs. It describes the rape and death of a Dar es Salaam woman who travelled to Zanzibar to see friends in Ng'ambo. Her death was caused by Kijiti, one of the males in the group who she had been invited by neighbours to spend a night "out on the town" with.

After testifying against Kijiti in court, two ladies who assisted in organising the expedition and providing the booze for it were found guilty of the woman's death (some reports indicate they were condemned to hang). The guilty guy managed to flee from the authorities and make it to the mainland. In addition to being horrified by the court's decision, this song implies that Ng' ambo locals also had their own theories about what justice would ultimately dole out to Kijiti.

=== Class struggles ===
Not only are songs from Siti's catalogue concerning colonial courts well-remembered, but I'd argue that these songs stand out in people's recollections specifically because the courts were such an important theatre of conflict during Siti's career's peak. Between 1925 and 1928, as the Ng'ambo ground rent strike grew more intense, the courts were frequently asked to enforce eviction notices against Ng'ambo tenants. Two of Ng'ambo's more infamous landlords delivered more than 500 eviction notices in a single year.

When Siti and her band left for their first recording session in Bombay in March 1928, the ground rent strike had almost completely taken over the country. Hundreds of locals turned out for protests as enraged mobs vowed to defend one another from the claws of "justice." They fulfilled their commitments. Crowds of several hundred men and women liberated friends and neighbours from the control of the police, the courts, and even the jail on at least five different times in 1928.

After more than a year of protests, demonstrations, and assaults on its "justice" institutions, the state ultimately gave in to the public. In years 1929 and 1930, ground rents were significantly decreased, and landlords were prohibited from suing tenants in court. Despite making up less than 0% of the sample of songs I have, those who lived during this time seem to remember songs about the colonial justice system extremely vividly.

== Final years ==
Siti kept up her musical pursuits well into old life. She met the well-known author and poet Shaaban Robert not long before she died. He interviewed her for a biography he was writing for a book he called "Wasifu wa Siti binti Saad." Tanzanian secondary schools teach this biography, which is regarded as some of the country's best writing. Siti binti Saad died on July 8, 1950, leaving a large void in the taarab community. Many others still sing in her style, even though there is a void that cannot be replaced. Bi Kidude was the leading exponent up until her death in 2013.

Siti binti Saad rose from the oppressed classes to make taarab music her vehicle, calling for social justice in what is now Tanzania. She protested against class oppression and men's abuse of women; her song "The Police has Stopped" sharply criticized a judge who let a rich wife-murderer go free. She seemed unafraid even of the sultan. Even after her death, her name is still widely used as a model for bravery. The Association of Women Journalists Tanzania (TAMWA) named their party newspaper Voice of the Siti. To this day Siti is used as a measure of teaching taarab.

Siti binti Saadi may have been a significant historical person, but not because her voice was recorded and sold from Zanzibar to Kinshasa, but rather because her songs captured the lives, the thoughts, and the problems of their day. Despite statements made in writing by Zanzibar authors that Siti's gramophone recordings were widely popular throughout East Africa, data kept by the Gramophone Company show that her sales were primarily restricted to the coast. Another explanation can be found in the likelihood that listeners in Lumbumbashi or Nakuru were not familiar with the local figures and events that gave these songs their significance. The ability of the music to speak was much diminished without the background to understand the lyrics.

== Example on CD anthology recording ==
- Echoes of Africa: Early Recordings (Wergo SM 1642 2)

== See also ==
- Taarab
