= Grzegorz Niemczuk =

- Born: Grzegorz Niemczuk; April 11, 1985 (age 41); Tychy, Poland
- Genres: Classical
- Occupations: Pianist, pedagogue
- Instrument: Piano
- Years active: 2003–present
- Website: niemczuk.com

Grzegorz Niemczuk (born 11 April 1985) is a Polish classical pianist and pedagogue specialising in the music of Frédéric Chopin. He is winner of the 40th National Fryderyk Chopin Piano Competition in Warsaw (2010) and of the 2013 International Carnegie Hall Concerto Debut Competition in New York City. He is based in Bielsko-Biała and serves on the piano faculty of the University of Silesia in Katowice.

== Early life and education ==
Niemczuk was born on 11 April 1985 in Tychy and began studying piano at the age of seven at the State Music School in Tychy. He subsequently studied at the Karol Szymanowski Secondary Music School in Katowice before graduating with distinction in 2009 from the Karol Szymanowski Academy of Music in Katowice, where he was a pupil of Professor Józef Stompel.

Between 2009 and 2013, he continued his studies in New York City as a scholarship holder at the International Keyboard Institute & Festival at Mannes College, where his teachers included Menahem Pressler, Philippe Entremont, Joaquín Achúcarro, David Dubal, Jerome Rose, Alexander Kobrin. From 2009 he was mentored by the American pianist Jeffrey Swann. He also participated in masterclasses with Krystian Zimerman, Andrzej Jasiński, Peter Donohoe, Đặng Thái Sơn, Michel Béroff, Arie Vardi, and Angela Hewitt, among others.

== Career ==
=== Early career ===
While still a student, Niemczuk won prizes at several Chopin-themed competitions, including in Łódź (2004), Varna (2005) and Konin (2008), and took first prize at international piano competitions in Zabrze (2003), Trieste (2007) and Waterloo (2008). In 2010 he won the 40th National Fryderyk Chopin Piano Competition in Warsaw. In 2013 he won the International Carnegie Hall Concerto Debut Competition in New York City, becoming the first Polish pianist to win this competition. The award led to his solo debut at Carnegie Hall in February 2013, where he performed Chopin's Piano Concerto No. 2 in F minor, Op. 21.

=== International career ===
In January 2017, Polish Radio Programme 1 compared Niemczuk's interpretations of Chopin to those of Martha Argerich, Maurizio Pollini and Adam Harasiewicz. In July 2017 he made his solo debut in Tokyo, after which the Japanese magazine Chopin published a positive review by critic Nobuko Fujimaki describing him as the "modern incarnation of Chopin"; the magazine subsequently engaged him to write monthly columns on the performance of Chopin's music. In December 2017, he made his Chinese debut at the Beijing Concert Hall as part of the Polish Circles of Art Festival, becoming a regular performer at subsequent editions.

He has performed in venues including Carnegie Hall and Steinway Hall in New York, Kioi Hall and Tokyo Bunka Kaikan, the Beijing Concert Hall, the Wiener Konzerthaus in Vienna, the Rudolfinum in Prague, the Tonhalle Zürich, the Stadt-Casino in Basel, Palau de la Música Catalana in Barcelona, and the Warsaw Philharmonic Hall. He made his debut at the Wiener Konzerthaus in September 2024 and returned to the venue's Mozart-Saal in October 2025. As of 2025, he had performed more than 500 recitals and concerts in some 38 countries on six continents.

=== Chopin video project and recordings ===
In April 2020, during the COVID-19 pandemic, Niemczuk launched an online project of filmed lectures analysing the entire piano output of Frédéric Chopin, published in Polish and English on YouTube and his Facebook page; by 2022 more than 320 episodes had been recorded, and the project ultimately exceeded 330 episodes. The project received a grant from the Polish Ministry of Culture and National Heritage. From 2024, Niemczuk began releasing a studio recorded series of complete Chopin works for piano on his own label, Grzegorz Niemczuk – Piano Studio.

=== Teaching ===
Niemczuk has been engaged in piano teaching since 2011, when he joined the piano faculty of the Institute of Music at the University of Silesia in Katowice. Since October 2017 he has worked as an assistant professor at the University of Silesia, based at the Institute of Music Arts in Cieszyn. His students have won prizes at piano competitions in Poland, Italy, Slovakia, Croatia and France.

== Personal life ==
Niemczuk lives in Bielsko-Biała and is married to the pianist Anna Lipiak, with whom he occasionally performs in duo recitals. In 2022 he was diagnosed with multiple sclerosis.

== Awards and recognition ==
In 2009, he was awarded the "Estrada Młodych" prize at the 43rd Festival of Polish Piano Music in Słupsk. In 2016, he received the Special Prize at the Busan Maru International Music Festival in Busan, South Korea.
