= Bi Kidude =

Tanzanian singer (c. 1910– 2013)

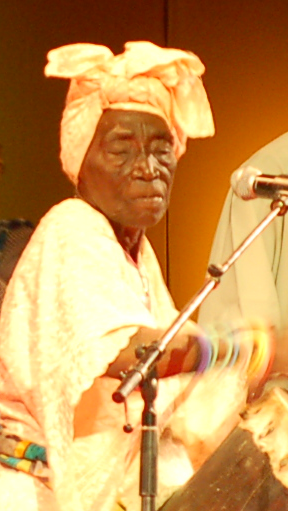
- Born: Fatuma binti Baraka c. 1910; Sultanate of Zanzibar
- Died: 17 April 2013 (aged 102–103)
- Occupation: Singer
- Awards: WOMEX Award; Tanzanian Medal for Arts and Sports
- Musical career
- Origin: Kati District, Unguja South Region, Zanzibar, Tanzania
- Genre: Taarab
- Instruments: Vocals • Ngoma drums
- Label: Independent

Fatuma binti Baraka (c. 1910 – 17 April 2013), popularly known as Bi Kidude, was a Tanzanian taarab singer from Zanzibar. She has been called the "queen of taarab and Unyago music" and was inspired by earlier taarab singer Siti binti Saad.

For her contribution to world music and culture in Zanzibar, she received the 2005 WOMEX award and the Medal for Arts and Sports of Tanzania.

== Life and career ==
Born in the village of Kitumba in the modern-day Kati District of Unguja South Region and raised in the village of Mfagimaringo, Bi Kidude was the daughter of a coconut seller in colonial Zanzibar. Her exact date of birth is unknown and much of her life story is uncorroborated, but she is believed to have been the oldest touring singer in the world during her final active years.

Bi Kidude was married and divorced twice. Having no children of her own, she took part in traditional Unyago coming-of-age ceremonies, where teenage girls receive social and sexual education. She became known by her nickname Bi Kidude (Swahili for "little grandmother"), because of her petite stature and as a polite form of addressing an older woman. In the course of her eventful life, she was active as a healer and knowledgeable about medicinal plants, a henna artist and, of course, a musician.

Bi Kidude started singing when she was ten, and after having been forced into marriage at thirteen, she escaped to mainland Tanganyika. There, she became a singer in various taarab groups in Dar es Salaam and other coastal cities. In the 1940s, she returned to Zanzibar and settled in the Shangani neighbourhood of Zanzibar's capital. She immersed herself in the styles of female-led taarab, whose outspoken lyrics metaphorically criticise men for their sexist behaviour. Gradually, she became a local celebrity but remained relatively unknown outside of Zanzibar for a long time.

In the 1980s, she became nationally recognised through an appearance on television. With her rebellious behaviour, smoking in public and her refusal to observe the separation of men and women in society, she disregarded conservative social attitudes, which was described by many as "haram".

For decades, the singer toured Zanzibar, singing her taarab songs in Swahili. Bi Kidude performed at countless ceremonies and festivals such as the Festival of the Dhow Countries, where she was often the main attraction. She travelled abroad with the Sahib El-Ahri Band and later with the Twinkling Stars, touring France, England, Scandinavia, the Middle East, Southeast Asia and Japan. She often performed on stage with the Culture Musical Club of Zanzibar, including some of the best taarab musicians from the island. Until shortly before her death, Bi Kidude appeared on several occasions at the Sauti za Busara festival in Zanzibar.

== Reception ==
In 2005, Bi Kidude received the WOMEX award for her lifetime achievement and contribution to world music. In 2011 she was nominated for the Tanzania Music Awards, and the following year, she was honoured with the Medal for Arts and Sports of Tanzania. Further, she was the subject of two documentaries by British filmmaker Andrew Jones, titled As Old As My Tongue – The Myth and Life of Bi Kidude and I shot Bi Kidude. In 2023, the BBC aired the podcast Bi Kidude: Zanzibar's 'golden grandmother of music'.

Today's singeli musicians in Tanzania are taking inspiration from Bi Kidude's music, using pitched-up loops and Unyago rhythms, and breaking the rules, similar to Kidude herself.

== Awards and nominations ==
=== Honours ===
Order	Country	Year
Medal for Arts and Sports	Tanzania	2012

=== Awards ===
- 2005 WOMEX world music award

=== Nominations ===
- 2011 Tanzania Music Awards - Best Collaboration & Best Traditional Song ('Ahmada' with Offside trick)

== Discography ==
- Zanzibar. RetroAfrique 1999
- Zanzibara 4: The Diva of Zanzibari Music. Buda Music, 2007

== See also ==
- Music of Tanzania
- Taarab
