= Orient (festival) =

Music festival in Baltic states

Orient is an annual music festival held in the Baltic countries concentrating on Asian music, the main focus being on folk, sacred, and traditional classical music. The festival has featured Oriental musicians such as Indian flautist Pandit Hariprasad Chaurasia, sitarists Pandit Ravi Shankar and Anoushka Shankar, the Japanese giant drum ensemble "Kodô", the Tuvinian guttural singers "Huun-Huur-Tu", Tibetan Buddhists monks of Gyuto and Gyume monasteries, the Turkish percussionist Burhan Öçal, the Armenian dudukist Jivan Gasparyan, and the Azeri muqam singer Alim Qasimov.
