= Taarab =

Music genre

- Cultural origins: Late 19th century

Subgenres
- Coastal taarab

Regional scenes
- African Coastal Region

Local scenes
- Tanzania • Zanzibar • Kenya

Other topics
- Bongo Flava; Singeli; Mdundiko; Kidumbaki; Unyago

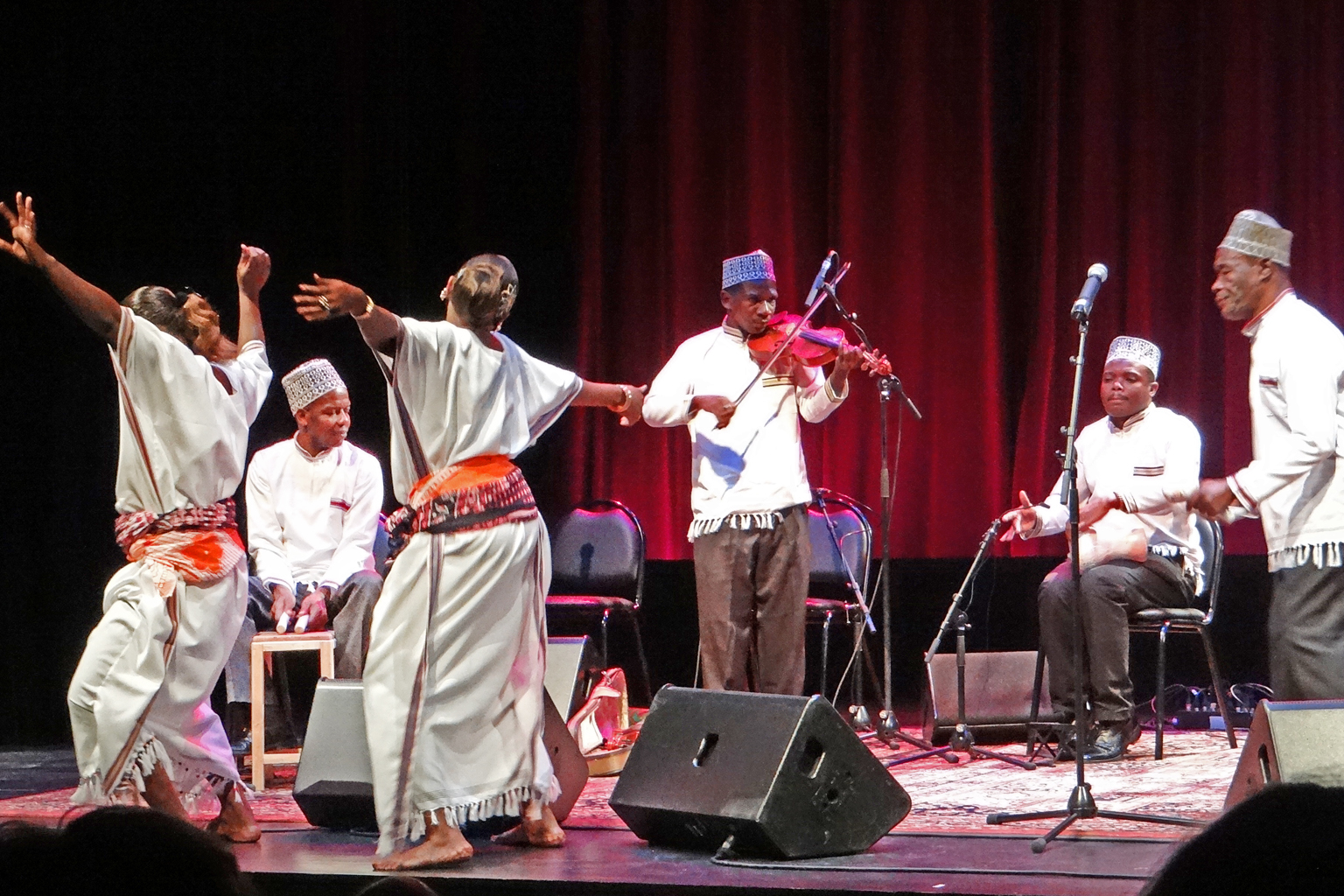
Taarab performance by Kithara Orchestra of Zanzibar in Paris

Taarab is a music genre popular in Tanzania and Kenya, and the wider Swahilisphere. It has been influenced by the musical traditions of the African Great Lakes, North Africa, the Middle East, and the Indian subcontinent. Taarab rose to prominence in 1928 with the advent of the genre's first star, Siti binti Saad.

According to local legend, taarab was popularized by Sultan Seyyid Barghash bin Said (1870-1888). He enjoyed luxury and the pleasures of life. It was this ruler who initiated taarab in Zanzibar; and later it spread all over the African Great Lakes region. The sultan imported a tarab ensemble from Egypt to play in his Beit el-Ajab palace. He subsequently decided to send Mohamed Ibrahim from Zanzibar to Egypt to learn music and to play the kanun, a string instrument similar to the zither. Upon his return, he formed the Zanzibar Taarab Orchestra. In 1905, Zanzibar's second music society, Ikwhani Safaa Musical Club, was established, which continues to thrive in the 21st century. Ikhwani Safaa and Culture Musical Club, were founded in 1958, have been the leading Zanzibar taarab orchestras.

== Etymology ==
The word taarab is a loanword from Arabic. The Arabic word tarab (طرب) means "having pleasure, delight with music".

== History of taarab music ==
After the spreading of taarab from the Sultan's palace to Zanzibari weddings and other community events, the first famous female singer of taarab was Siti bint Saad. In 1928, she and her band became the first from the region to make commercial recordings as the first East African to be recorded in the Bombay His Master's Voice studios. She would become one of the most famous taarab musicians of all time.

Over the next several decades, bands and musicians like Bi Kidude, Mzee Yusuph, Culture Musical Club and Al-Watan Musical Club kept taarab at the forefront of the Tanzanian scene, and made inroads across the world. Playing in a similar style, smaller Kidumbak ensembles grew popular, at least among the poor of Zanzibar, featuring two small drums, bass, violins and dancers using claves and maracas.

The 1960s saw a group called the Black Star Musical Club from Tanga modernize the genre, bringing it to audiences farther afield, especially Burundi and Kenya. More recently, modern taarab bands like East African Melody have emerged, as have related backbiting songs for women, called mipasho.

Taarab music is a fusion of Swahili poetry sung in rhythmic poetic style, performed by male or female singers and taarab ensembles comprising numerous musicians. Taarab forms a part of the social life of the Swahili people along the coastal areas, especially in Zanzibar, Tanga and even further in Mombasa and Malindi along the Kenya coast.

Wherever the Swahili-speaking people travelled, Taraab moved with them. It has penetrated as far inland as Uganda, Rwanda and Burundi in East Africa, where taarab groups compete in popularity with other kinds of popular musical groups. It spread to the Comoros, where it is known as twarab, in the early 20th century and remains a major musical force there.

In the early 21st century a taarab revolution has been taking place and much debate continues about the music which has been changed by the East African Melody phenomenon. Melody, as they are known by their mostly female fans, play modern taarab, which is 'taarab to dance to' and features direct lyrics, bypassing the lyrical subtlety of the older songs, where the meaning of the lyrics is only alluded to, and never directly inferred. Today, taarab songs may be explicit – sometimes even graphic – in sexual connotation, and much of the music of groups like Melody and Muungano is composed and played on keyboards, increasing portability for different venues. Also, the groups are much smaller in number than traditional taarab orchestras and therefore more readily available to tour and play shows throughout the region and beyond. Tanzanians' are still developing this kind of music. Mzee Yusuph, the band leader of Jahazi Modern Taarab, is termed as the king of modern taarab.

There is also a sub genre of Swahili taarab music called Indian taarab or taarab ya kihindi that features Swahili words set to Hindi film melodies and performed in a peculiar Indian style.

== See also ==
- Music of Tanzania
- Tarab
