= Kidumbaki =

Musical genre in Zanzibar

Kidumbaki or kidumbak is a Zanzibari musical genre. It is closely related to taarab (with Arab- and Indian-influenced music and singing in Swahili) but it is played by smaller ensembles. The typical kidumbaki band comprises a fiddle, a sanduku (a kind of washtub bass), a bass, and two "kidumbak" drums. Traditional percussions such as cherewas are sometimes used as well.

Kidumbaki is sometimes called kitaarab, loosely translatable as "little taarab" (the particle ki-, in Swahili, is used for diminutives). It is disputed, anyway, whether kidumbaki is to be regarded as a derivative of taarab or the other way round. Some of the founders of taarab, such as Siti binti Saad, did in fact span across the two genres. Also, taarab ensembles in the early 20th century were usually much smaller than they are today, and more like modern "kidumbaki" ensembles.

Makame Faki of musical ensemble Sina Chuki Kidumbak was one of the most popular kidumbaki singers.
