= Swahili culture =

Culture of the Swahili people in Africa

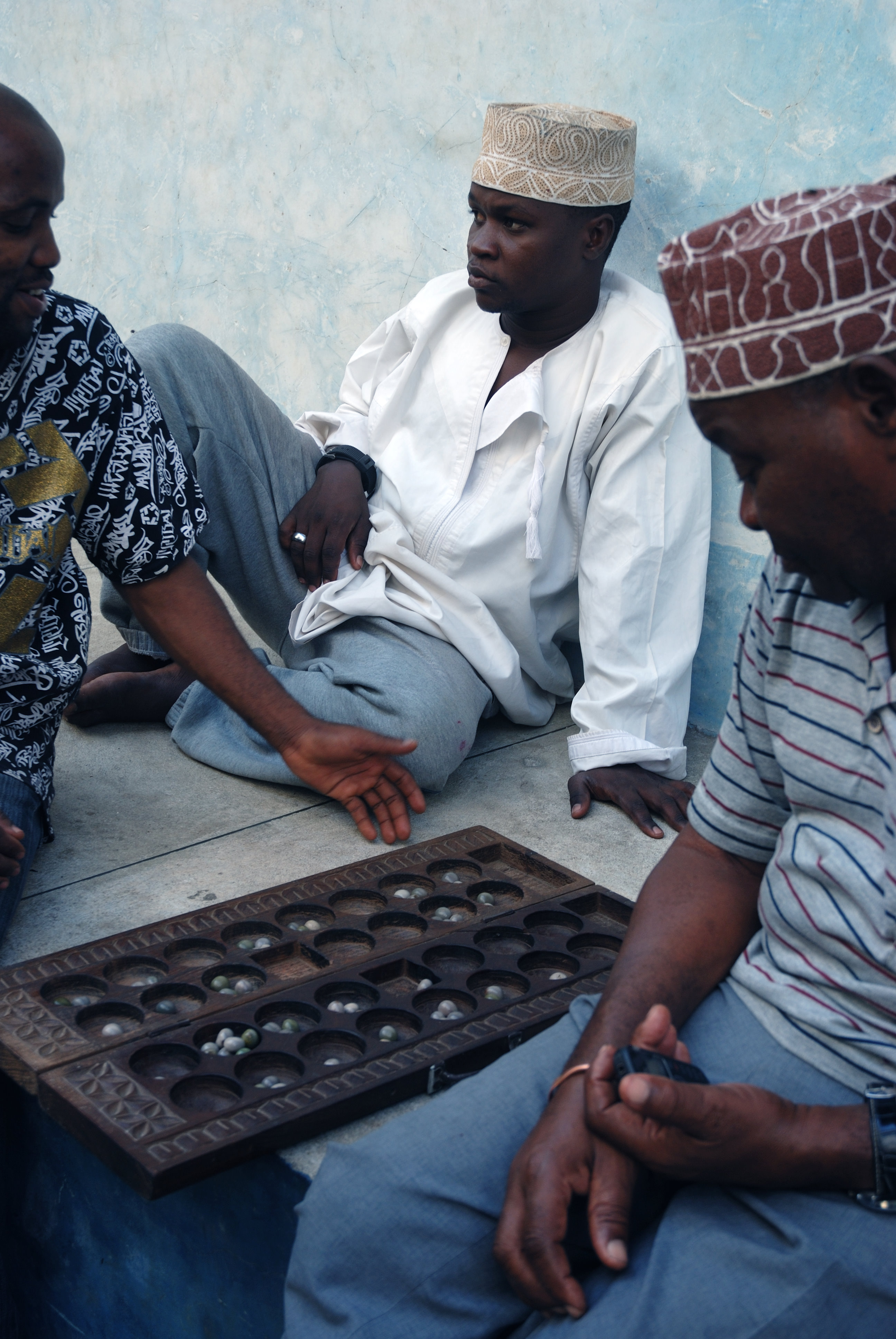
Bao players in the Stone Town of Zanzibar

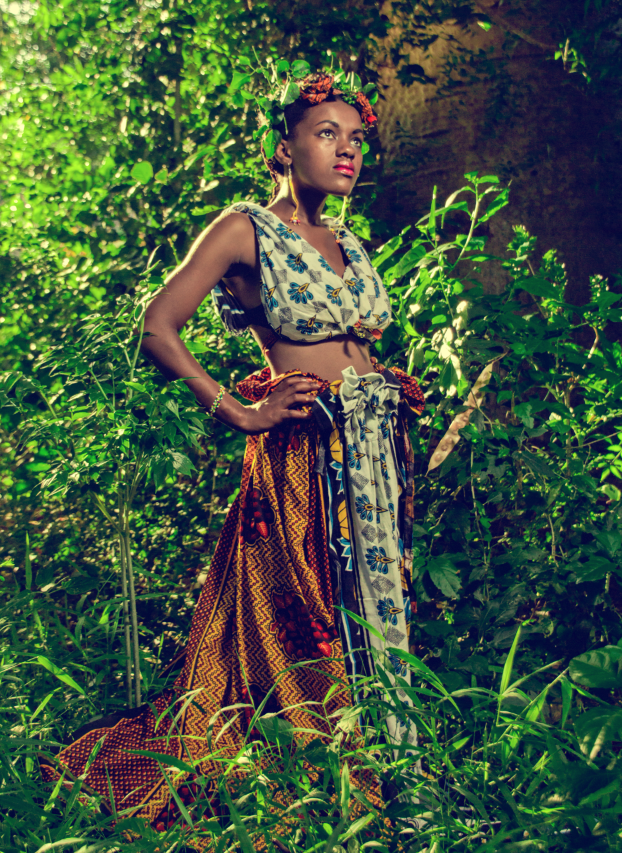
Woman dressed in modern clothes, Tanzania, Bagamoyo

Swahili culture is the culture of the Swahili people inhabiting the Swahili coast. This littoral area encompasses Tanzania, Kenya, and Mozambique, as well as the adjacent islands of Zanzibar and the Comoros along with some parts of Malawi and the eastern part of Democratic Republic of Congo. Swahili people speak Swahili as their native language, which belongs to the Bantu language family. Graham Connah described Swahili culture as at least partially urban, mercantile, and literate.

Swahili culture is the product of the history of the coastal part of the African Great Lakes region. As with the Swahili language, Swahili culture has a Bantu core that has borrowed from foreign influences.

== History and identity ==
The medieval sites along the Swahili coast represent a cultural tradition with diverse local traditions dating the ninth century CE. This has developed into the modern Swahili culture. Currently, there are 173 identified settlements that flourished along the Swahili coast and nearby islands from the ninth to the seventeenth centuries, which include the sites of Kilwa, Malindi, Gedi, Pate, Comoros, and Zanzibar. The most recent excavations at these coastal sites have been used to examine the spread of Islam in East Africa and the development of the Swahili culture. However, the identity of the Swahili (and of the people associated with and the development of the culture along the Swahili coast) has often been disputed in both the past and present. The historic use of coral among the Swahili in construction, who used stone as construction material for mosques and tombs, has been associated with the emergence of the use of coral stone for construction in the fourteenth century along the coast for buildings ascribed with the most importance. Conversely, it has been stated that the sites were founded by Arab or Persian colonists.

It has been claimed that Swahili culture emerged from the settlement of Arab merchants with the ruins being called Arab cities and with many Swahili self-identifying as descendants of Arabs or Persians. Opinions published in 2000 suggest that the medieval Swahili coastal sites developed locally with the creation of small agricultural and fishing communities that gave rise to the Swahili culture through trade that resulted in an increase in Islamic influence during the twelfth century. Increased contact with the Islamic world then would have led to the integration of local African and Arab traditions, creating an indigenous Swahili culture. A blend of these two interpretations exists with accounts of Arab merchants marrying local women, which created a distinctive Arab-African Swahili culture. The culture appears to have emerged in Kenya and Tanzania and eventually spread to Mozambique.

Data from a study of Swahili genetics were published in 2023. The DNA of dozens of individuals buried in medieval Swahili settlements in Kenya and Tanzania between 1250 and 1800 were collected and analyzed. The research concluded that the ancient persons "genomes point to the diverse origins of Swahili culture, with people carrying a mix of local African, Middle Eastern, and South Asian ancestry" and support the accuracy of oral histories that often have been discounted about the origins of the Swahili culture. Anthropological archaeologist Chapurukha Kusimba, who co-led the study, stated that the subjects "were descended from people who began mixing around 1000. Nearly all the East African ancestry seemed to come from women, whereas most of the Asian ancestry was contributed by men from Persia" and that the results of the genetic testing support the oral traditions of Swahili people, dispelling the colonial idea that Swahili civilization is or ever was "essentially an Arab civilization".

The early Swahili city-states followed Islam and were cosmopolitan and politically independent of each other. The chief exports of these cultures were slaves, salt, ebony, gold, ivory, and sandalwood. These city-states began to decline toward the sixteenth century, mainly as a consequence of the advent of the Portuguese. Eventually, Swahili trading centers went out of business, and commerce between Africa and Asia on the Indian Ocean collapsed.

Historic Swahili culture was urban and dominated by a strict class structure.

Aspects of Swahili culture are diverse due to its many influences. For example, Swahili cuisine has influences from Indian and Arabic cultures. There are alterations to certain dishes due to religious reasons. Some food items common in everyday lives of the Swahili are fish, tropical fruits, and exotic spices.

== Arts and crafts ==
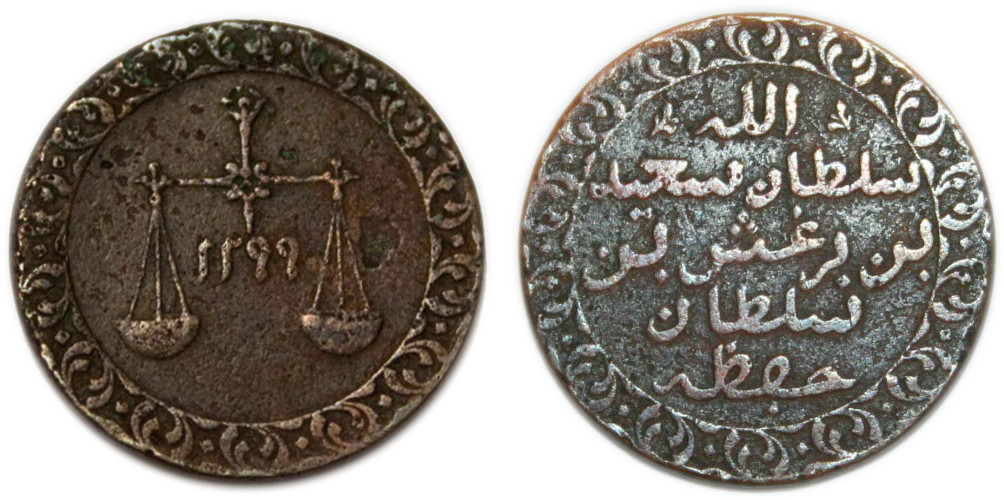
Swahili Arabic script on One Pesa Coin from Zanzibar circa 1299 AH (1882 AD)

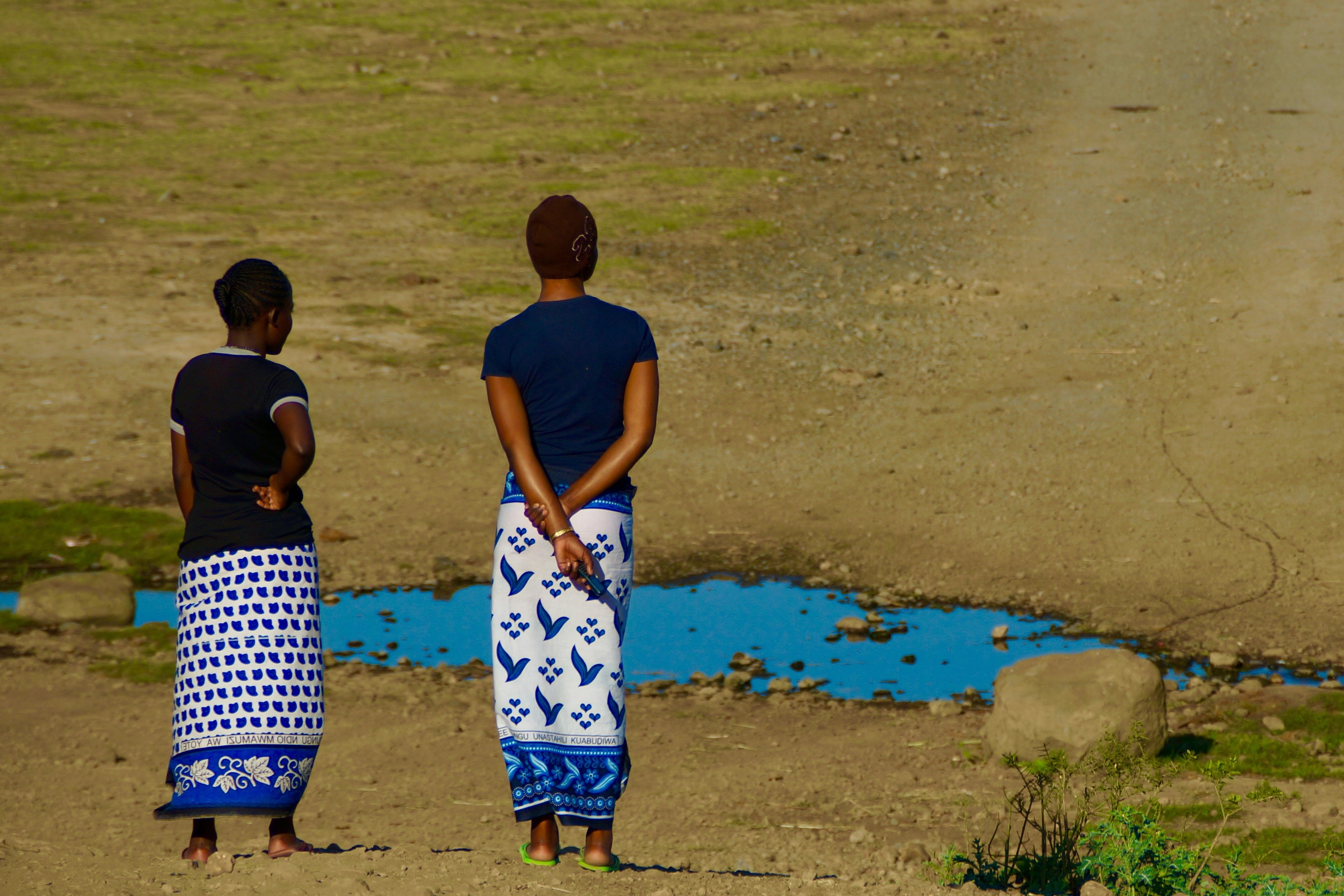
Women wearing Kangas with Swahili sayings and geometric designs in Moshi, Tanzania

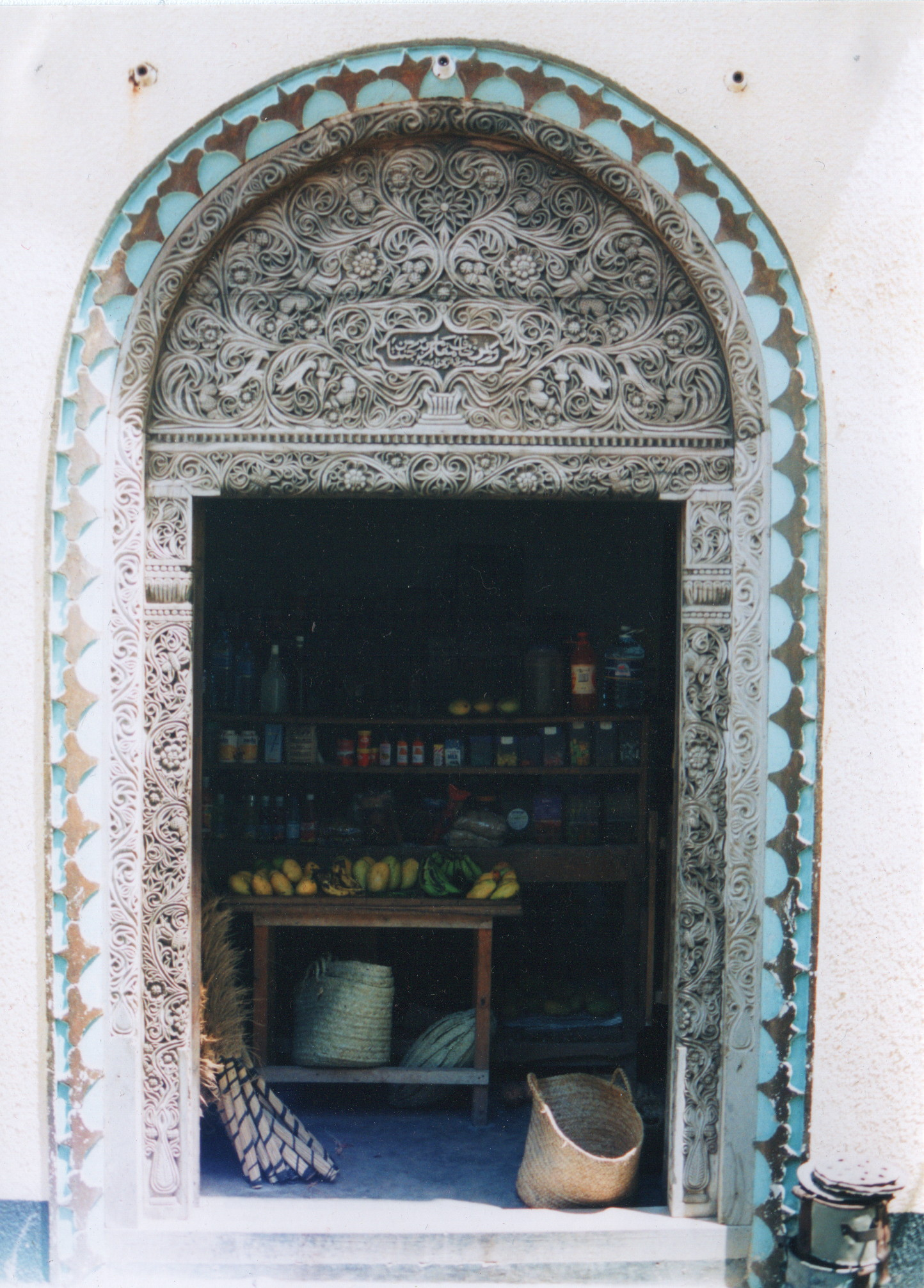
Swahili Arabic script on a carved wooden door at Lamu in Kenya

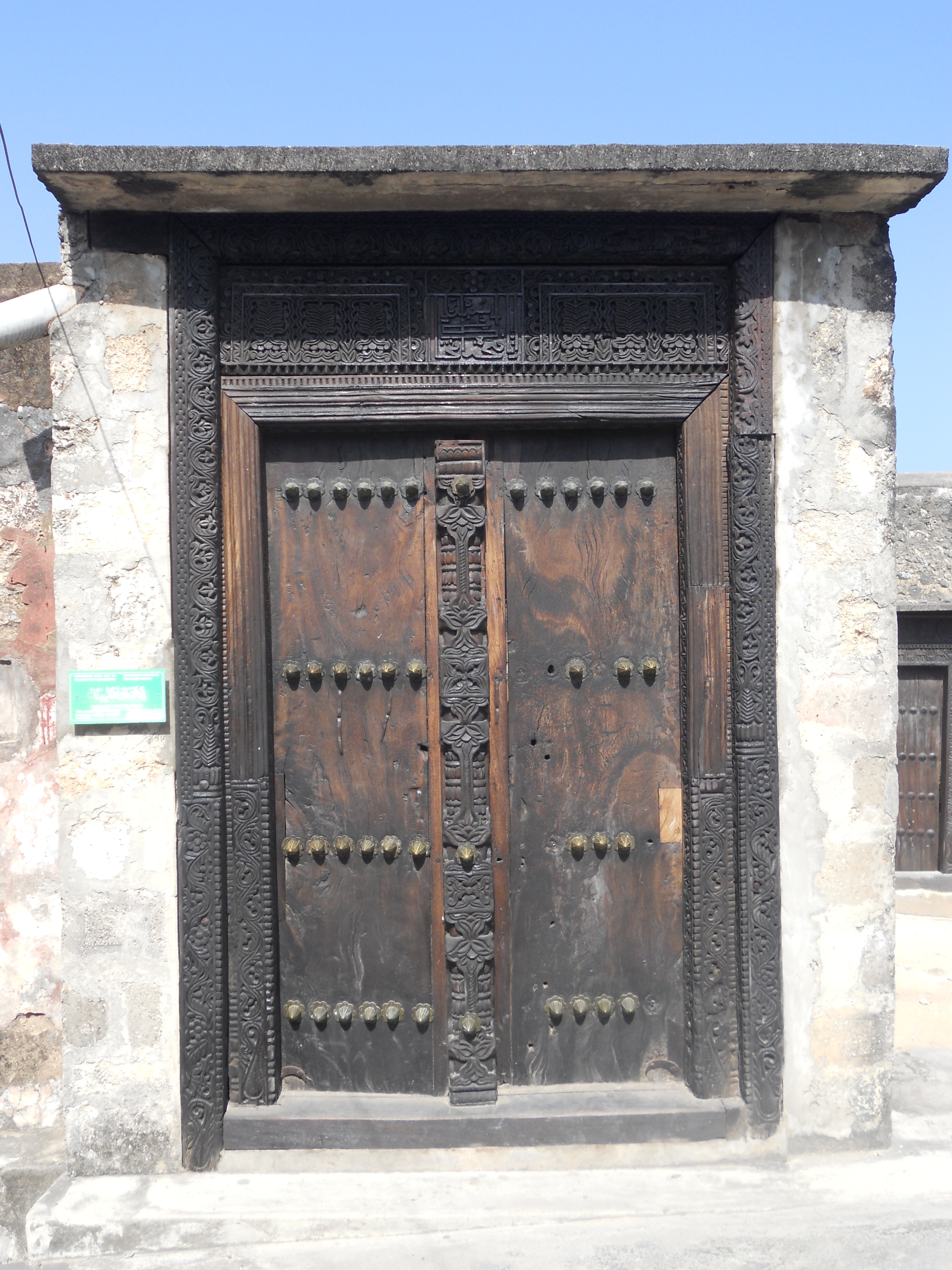
Swahili inscription in Arabic script on wooden door in Fort Jesus, Mombasa in Kenya

Another cultural aspect of the Swahili is their use of arts and crafts, which they find to be significant. When creating art, they express themselves through creativity as well as through shape and function. Swahili art, furniture, and architecture reflect multicultural influences. They usually refrain from the use of designs with images of living beings due to their Muslim heritage. Instead, Swahili designs are primarily geometric.

There are important clothes that are part of their arts and crafts such as the kanga. The kanga is not only a rectangular piece of cloth, but is an artifact of the Swahili culture. The cloth is made with extreme care and should relate to the season. For instance, if the cloth does not match the season, then it is unfit to be a kanga and may instead be used as a baby diaper or an apron for the kitchen. Even though the kanga is quite inexpensive, it is still an important part of Swahili culture. Kangas are made in Tanzania and are mostly appealing to women rather than men, but men are not restricted from using it. The textile is also used as a sling to carry babies, carry melons on a wearer’s head, and may also be used as a kitchen apron.

== Music ==
The most typical musical genre of Swahili culture is taarab (or tarabu), sung in the Swahili language. Its melodies and orchestration have Arab and Indian influences, although Western instruments, such as accordions or guitars, are sometimes used.

In the 20th century several musical genres emerged in the Swahili world, and they are derivatives of Western popular music. One major example is muziki wa dansi, which is the Tanzanian counterpart of Congolese soukous (rumba). In the last decades of the century, most Swahili music was in the afropop vein, which includes several local derivatives of American hip hop (e.g., bongo flava).

== See also ==
- Zanzibari cuisine
- Liongo
