= Origins of the Shirazi =

Discussion of origins of the Shirazi people who live along the Swahili coast.

The origins of the Shirazi people is a controversial issue in the historiography of East Africa. A number of Shirazi legends proliferated along the East African coast, most involving a named or unnamed Persian prince marrying a Swahili princess. Modern academics reject the authenticity of the primarily Iranian origin claim. They point to the relative rarity of Iranian customs and speech, lack of documentary evidence of Shi'ism in the literature on the Swahili Coast, and instead a historic abundance of Sunni Arab-related evidence. However, recent genetic evidence points towards noticeable Iranian admixture.

== Historical background ==
=== Islamic records ===
Arab geographers from the twelfth and later centuries historically divided the eastern coast of Africa into several regions based on each region's respective inhabitants. According to the twelfth century geography of Al-Idrisi, completed in 1154 CE, there were four littoral zones: Barbar (Bilad al Barbar; "land of the Berbers") in the Horn of Africa, which was inhabited by Somalis and stretched southward to the Shebelle river; Zanj (Ard al-Zanj; "country of the blacks"), located immediately below that up to around Tanga or the southern part of Pemba island; Sofala (Ard Sufala), extending from Pemba to an unknown terminus, but probably around the Limpopo river; and Waq-Waq, a land south thereof whose precise location is unclear.

Islam was introduced to the northern Somalia coast early on from the Arabian peninsula, shortly after the hijra. Ibn al-Mujawir later wrote that, due to various battles in the Arabian peninsula, Banu Majid people from Yemen settled in the central Mogadishu area. Yaqut and Ibn Said described the city as another important center of Islam, which actively traded with the Swahili-speaking African region to the south of it. The thirteenth century texts also mention mosques and individuals with names such as "al-Shirazi" and "al-Sirafi" and a clan called "Sirafi at Merca", suggestive of an early Persian presence in the area.

To the south of the Barbar region, Al-Masudi mentions seaborne trade from Oman and Siraf port near Shiraz to the African Zanj coast, Sofala and Waq-Waq. Ibn Battuta would later visit the Kilwa Sultanate in the 14th century, which was at the time ruled by a Yemeni dynasty led by Sultan Hasan bin Sulayman. Battuta described the majority of inhabitants as being "Zanj" and "jet-black" in color, many of whom had facial tattoos.

Another set of records are found in the Book of the Zanj (Kitab al-Zanuj), a likely compilation of mythical oral traditions and memories of settled traders on the Swahili coast. The late 19th-century document claims that Persians and Arabs were sent by governors of the Persian Gulf region to conquer and colonize the trading coast of East Africa. It also mentions the establishment of the Shirazi dynasty by Madagan and Halawani Arab merchants, whose identity and roots are unclear. Similarly, the Kilwa Chronicle, a medieval document surviving in both Arabic and Portuguese, indicates that the early Shirazi also settled in Hanzuan (Anjouan, in the Comoros Islands), the Green Island (Pemba), Mandakha, Shaugu and Yanbu.

== Theories of origin ==
=== Persian origins ===
There are two main stories about the origins of the Shirazi people. One thesis based on oral tradition and some written sources (such as the Kilwa Chronicle) state that immigrants from the Shiraz region in southwestern Iran directly settled various mainland ports and islands on the East African seaboard beginning in the tenth century, in an area between Zanzibar in the north and Sofala in the south. According to Irving Kaplan, prior to the 7th century, these areas would have already been occupied by Khoisan ("Bushmanoid") Africans, who, by the time of the Persian settlement in the area, would have themselves been displaced by Bantu and Nilotic populations. More people from different parts of the Persian Gulf also continued to migrate to the Swahili coast in subsequent centuries, forming the modern Shirazi.

A variation of the "Persian theory" posits that the Shirazi came from Persia, but first settled on the Somali coast near Mogadishu. In the twelfth century, as the gold trade with the distant entrepot of Sofala on the Mozambique seaboard grew, the settlers are then said to have moved southwards to various coastal towns in Kenya, Tanzania, northern Mozambique and the Indian Ocean islands. By 1200 AD, they had established local sultanates and mercantile networks on the islands of Kilwa, Mafia and Comoros along the Swahili coast, and in northwestern Madagascar.

A third theory links the Shirazi people to the Lamu Archipelago, islands in the Indian Ocean close to north Kenya, which oral traditions claim were settled by seven brothers from the Iranian city of Shiraz. The Lamu archipelago descendants then moved south in the 10th and 11th centuries. This is contested and the opposing view states that the Shirazi legend took on new importance in the 19th century, during the period of Omani domination. Claims of Persian Shirazi ancestry were used to distance locals from Arab newcomers. Thus, emphasis that the Shirazi came very long ago and intermarried with indigenous locals is argued by some to be revisionist politics intending to fuse the Shirazi origins with Swahili heritage.

=== Bantu-speaking Africans ===
Dismissing the ancestral claims of the native people as fictions, some contemporary scholars assert that both the Swahili and Shirazi people are the descendants of Bantu-speaking farmers who migrated to the East African coast in the first millennium C.E. These Bantu farmers would have adopted maritime tools and systems, including fishing and sailing, and developed a healthy regional trade network by the 8th century C.E. The upsurge in Indian Ocean trade after the 9th century C.E. brought an increase in Muslim traders and Islamic influence, and beginning in the 12th century, which would have prompted many of the elites among these communities to convert. They constructed complex, often fictive, genealogies that connected them to the central Islamic lands. Since Persian traders were dominant in the early centuries of the second millennium, many Swahili patricians adopted Persian cultural motifs and claimed a distant common ancestry.

According to the anthropologist Helena Jerman, the Shirazi identity (Washirazi) was born after the arrival of Islam, in the 17th century. Their traditional Bantu lineage names were gradually abandoned and substituted with Arabic family names (e.g. Wapate became Batawiyna), new origin legends and social structures were imagined into folklores, and the societal structures were adopted from Persian and Arab settlers from nearby societies in Asia.

== Contemporary demography ==
=== Contemporary genetics ===
Genetic analysis by Msaidie et al. (2010) indicates that the most common paternal lineages among the contemporary Comorian population, which includes Shirazi people, are clades that are frequent in sub-Saharan Africa (E1b1a1-M2 (41%) and E2-M90 (14%)). The samples also contain some northern Y chromosomes, indicating possible paternal ancestry from South Iran (E1b1b-V22, E1b1b-M123, F*(xF2, GHIJK), G2a, I, J1, J2, L1, Q1a3, R1*, R1a*, R1a1, and R2 (29.7%)), and Southeast Asia (O1 (6%)).

The Comorians also predominantly bear mitochondrial haplogroups linked with sub-Saharan East African populations in East and South East Africa (L0, L1, L2 and L3′4(xMN) (84.7%)), with the remaining maternal clades associated with Southeast Asia (B4a1a1-PM, F3b, and M7c1c (10.6%), and M(xD, E, M1, M2, M7) (4%)) but no Middle Eastern lineages. According to Msaidie et al., given that there are no common Middle Eastern maternal haplogroups on the Comoros, there is "striking evidence for male-biased gene flow from the Middle East to the Comoros", which is "entirely consistent with male-dominated trade and religious proselytisation being the forces that drove the Middle Eastern gene flow to the Comoros".
