= Abbasid expeditions to East Africa =

Legendary military campaigns, 8th-9th c. CE

Two or three Abbasid expeditions to East Africa are mentioned in the late Arabic Book of the Zanj. They are considered legendary rather than historical by contemporary scholarship.

== Accounts of the expeditions ==
The Abbasid caliphs al-Manṣūr (754–775), Hārūn al-Rashīd (786–809) and al-Maʾmūn (813–833) are reputed to have sent punitive expeditions to the Islamized city-states of the Somali coast and set up governors there. The Book of the Zanj does not survive in any copy earlier than the 20th century and its historical reliability is highly questionable for the early Islamic period.

The 9th-century writer al-Jāḥiẓ records an Omani expedition to East Africa in the late 7th century, but it was defeated. According to the Book of the Zanj, Islam came to Mogadishu and Kilwa in 694–695 during the reign of the Umayyad caliph Marwān I. (Note: The Book of the Zanj is unsure whether the Umayyad wālī was Muʿāwiya ibn Sufiyān or Mūsa ibn ʿUmar al-Ḥathʿamī.) Both the Book of the Zanj and the Pate Chronicle, which places it slightly later in 696–697, attribute the arrival of Syrian Muslims to caliphal initiative. The inhabitants of the coast accepted Islam and agreed to pay the kharāj to the caliphs. The Abbasids, who took over from the Umayyads in 750, sent an emissary, Yahya ibn ʿUmar al-ʿAnazī, to the East African cities in 765–766. The sultans of Mogadishu, Mārka, Barāwa, Faza, Sīwī, Bata, Manda (Munda), Ṭaqa, Lamu (Āmu), Ūzi, Malindi (Malūdi), Uyūmba, Kilifi, Basāsa, Zanzibar, Kilwa and Waybu (possibly a tributary of the Shebelle) are among those who accepted the emissary. Gervase Mathew dates this to 766–767 and considers it a military expedition.

In 804, according to the Book, the Zanj refused to pay the kharāj and Hārūn sent an emir with soldiers against them. He replaced the Arab wālīs with Persians from Shīrāz in every village from Mogadishu to Kilwa. The Pate Chronicle also mentions Hārūn sending the Persians. The Persians were loyal for many years, but they stopped sending the kharāj even during the reign of Hārūn and entered open rebellion during the Miḥna of al-Maʾmūn, when he espoused the createdness of the Quran. The Zanj (Note: The Book of the Zanj says "they", which the translators gloss as "the Swahili people". Mukhtar refers specifically to the continuing rebelliousness of Mogadishu.) sent a manifesto to Baghdad and the caliph sent an army of 50,000 (raised either in Iraq or Egypt) to Malindi, which caused the leaders of the rebellion to flee into the nyika (brush country). They returned when the army left, but paid the outstanding kharāj and accepted the opinion of al-Maʾmūn. The Book of the Zanj dates these events to 837–838, which is not consistent with the reign of al-Maʾmūn.

== Historicity ==
According to Neville Chittick, these accounts in the Book of the Zanj must be given up as mythical. The authenticity and historical reliability of the Book of the Zanj have been questioned by modern scholars. The earliest known copies appear to derive from a single clerk at Malindi in the early 20th century. Its account of the Oromo in the Horn of Africa prior to the 16th century is unsupported by earlier written sources. The text’s strong Arabizing tendencies, including the replacement of Shirazi and Bantu clan names with Arabic forms and the promotion of the legend of Ham, align it with later coastal chronicles such as the Lamu and Pate chronicles, both of which have been criticized for genealogical fabrication and inconsistencies with archaeological evidence. Consequently, some scholars regard the Book of the Zanj as a relatively late composition rather than a reliable early historical source.

Archaeological evidence does not support extensive Arab or Persian settlement in these places at so early a date. He notes, however, that a gold dinar of Hārūn al-Rashīd dated to 798 or 799 has been found at Pemba, which is usually identified with the Qanbalū of Arabic sources. He suggests that if the accounts in the Book of the Zanj bear any relation to history it is probably to be found in the early settlement of Muslims on the East African coast associated with this coin find. Felix Chami et al. cast doubt on any Arab expeditions to East Africa after that recorded by al-Jāḥiẓ.
