= Kawkab al-durriya li-akhbar Ifriqiya =

The Kawkab al-durriya li-akhbār Ifrīqiya is an Arabic chronicle of the stretch of the east African coast known as Zanj. It was written in 1913 by Fāḍil bin ʿUmar al-Bawrī.

The title of the Kawkab, which translates 'The Lustrous Star of Information about Africa', was inspired by the poem al-Kawākib al-durriya fi madḥ Khayr al-Bariyya ('the sparkling stars in praise of the best of mankind') by the 13th-century Egyptian poet al-Būṣiri. The language of the work is Arabic of a very low quality. The writing in general is poor and may represent only a first draft, which the author's death prevented him from editing. The last sentence suggests a second volume that may never have been written.

The author of the Kawkab was Shaykh Fāḍil bin ʿUmar al-Bawrī. (Note: The title shaykh is shehe in Swahili (Ritchie & von Sicard 2020, p. 4). His name is spelled Fazil bin Omar Alburi in Elliot 1926.) He was a Swahili, an ethnic Bājūn (Note: Ritchie & von Sicard 2020, p. 4, n7, quote A. H. J. Prins' definition of the Bājūn as "a coalition of (formerly Cushitic-speaking) pastoralists with Bantu-speakers". Elliot 1926, p. 150, n2, describes al-Bawrī as "an Arab ... said to have Pokomo blood.") and native speaker of Swahili. The name Bawrī indicates that he belonged to the clan of that name from Pate Island. He probably belonged to the WaUngwana, (Note: Ritchie & von Sicard 2020, p. 4, n10, define this as "free men, inhabitants of the place, people of mixed Persian, Arab and African blood", Prins 2017, p. 102, as "freebom of aristocratic descent".) the class which had the historical righ to elect the sultan of Pate. He was a civil servant in the service first of the Mazrūʿī ruler of Takaungu, then of the Imperial British East Africa Company and after 1895 of the East Africa Protectorate. He served as mudīr (headman) of the village of Roka in 1905–1908 and 1909–1910, of Mtanganyiko in 1908–1909 and of Arabuko in 1910–1913. He retired in 1913 at an advanced age to write his Kawkab. He died later that year.

The Kawkab is known from a single manuscript, which appears to be the autograph. There are extensive marginal notes added by somebody else. A note states that the manuscript was given to Shaykh ʿUthmān bin Shaykh Muḥammad ʿAbd al-Sumālī in AH 1347 (1928–1929). The published English translation by James Ritchie is based on a photostat made by James Kirkman, then warden of Fort Jesus Museum, in the 1960s. The text relies on both oral and written sources. The most important of the latter is the Book of the Zanj, which the Kawkab follows closely.

The Kawkab has a strong bias in favour of the Nabhānī rulers of Pate and Siyu and against the Mazārīʿ. According to his own words, Fāḍil bin ʿUmar al-Bawrī wrote it because the Sultanate of Zanzibar granted subsidies to Arab communities. The first part of his work is thus a demonstration of the Arabness or not of the various coastal towns of Zanj. He even includes a mnemonic poem for memorizing the truly Arab groups. He also includes a four-line poem in Swahili, but he does not identify the author of either poem. He describes his work as "about Africa and the sea coast eastward in the region of the Equator at a place called 'the Juba', in explanation of the Zunūj [Zanj] who were created (or born) in it originally and the Arabs and non-Arabs and the Christians [Europeans]."

The second part of the work is a more straightforward history. The marginal notes, written in superior Arabic, keep track of the chronology. The historical value of most of the Kawkab and especially its earliest history is highly questionable, but "there is linguistic and other evidence to indicate that [its] stories may be more than mere fancy or legend."
