= Shirazis of the Comoros =

The Shirazis of the Comoros, 138,000 people with Iranian heritage, are one of the largest ethnic groups inhabiting the archipelago nation of Comoros near the east African coast, representing 17% of the total population of that country. Their origins are linked by various traditions to Shiraz and the southwestern coastal region of Persia (now Iran), though some scholars instead assert an origin in Somalia. 89,000 people or 11% of the population from the Comoros have Southeast Asian ancestry. The Shirazi people are notable for helping establish Sunni Islam in Comoros, and the wealth they accumulated from trading commodities and slaves.

== Genetics in Comoros ==
Msaidie et al. (2010) analyzed the uniparental DNA variation on three Bantu-speaking islands of the Comoros archipelago, collecting blood samples from 577 unrelated Comorian men and women (Grand Comore: 170 men, 67 women; Anjouan: 104 men, 69 women; Moheli: 107 men, 60 women). Oral traditions and historical records indicate that the Comoros islands had a presence of merchants from Shiraz in Iran and that Shirazi princes colonized these islands.

Msadie et al. found that the most common paternal haplogroups among the sampled Comorians are E1b1a1-M2 (41%) and E2-M90 (14%). These Y-DNA clades are frequent among other Bantu-speaking populations on the east African mainland, which points to shared origins. The remaining Comorians primarily carry the haplogroups E1b1b-V22, E1b1b-M123, F*(xF2, GHIJK), G2a, I, J1, J2, L1, Q1a3, R1*, R1a*, R1a1 and R2 (29.7%). Of these latter clades, the particular haplotypes that are found in Comoros were observed to be most closely related to those in South Iran. This suggests that these northern lineages were brought by early Shirazi merchants from Persia between 1200-1300 CE, as they established local trading posts on the Comoros islands. Around 6% of the Comorians also bear the O1 haplogroup, which indicates a minor Southeast Asian influence.

Maternally, the Comorians primarily belong to the L0, L1, L2 and L3′4(xMN) haplogroups (84.7%). These mtDNA clades are also common among other mainland Bantu populations and at roughly similar proportions. The rest of the Comorian population almost exclusively carries mitochondrial haplogroups associated with Southeast Asia (15.3%), with the B4a1a1-PM, F3b and M7c1c clades (10.6%) and the M(xD, E, M1, M2, M7) paragroup (4%) most frequent. Since no mtDNA haplogroups linked with the Middle East were observed, the gene flow from this region appears to have occurred through male-dominated trade and religious proselytisation.

According to Msaidie et al., admixture analysis of the maternal and paternal contributions in the Comoros sample indicates that the Comorian population was formed through tripartite gene flow over the last 2,000 years between Bantu populations in sub-Saharan coastal East Africa, settlers from Iran, and migrants from Southeast Asia. Consequently, most of the Comorian islanders' gene pool is estimated to have derived from Africa (72%), with significant contributions from Western Asia (17%) and Southeast Asia (11%). Overall, the Comorian Shirazi were found to be genetically similar to the Lemba, a Bantu-speaking population inhabiting southeast Africa. Since the Lemba have Semitic cultural traditions and Bantu, Middle Eastern and Southeast Asian associated paternal lineages have also been detected among them, the scientists suggest that they and the Comorians may have evolved through parallel demographic processes.

== See also ==
- Shirazi people
- Kilwa Sultanate
- Kizimkazi Mosque
- Zanj Empire
