= Kashur =

Kashur may refer to:

- Kashur, an other name for the Kashmiri language
- Kashur or Kushur, the ancestors of the Mijikenda peoples according to the Book of the Zanj
