= Book of the Zanj =

The Book of the Zanj (or Kitāb al-Zunūj) is an Arabic history of the Zanj (Zenj, Zengi) who live in East Africa from their origins down to the turn of the 20th century.

There are two manuscripts of the Book, the more recent one offering an expanded text. The older one, labelled K or C, was produced shortly after 1888. In 1923, it was in the possession of the qāḍī of Kismayo, when a copy was procured by Enrico Cerulli. The younger one, labelled L or W, was made after 1902 in Witu for Alice Werner. It was acquired by Cerulli in 1926. Both manuscripts have been translated into English.

The authors of both versions of the Book are unknown. The text is written in Arabic of low quality and the authors' first language was certainly Swahili. There are numerous Swahilisms in the text and one quatrain in Swahili. Both authors wrote in Bājūn and were sympathetic to the rulers of Pate and of Siyu, but opposed to the Mazrūʿī liwalis of Mombasa. The purpose of the Book was to trace the Arabness and Islamic faith of the Swahilis back to the earliest days of Islam and demonstrate their persistence through periods of Abbasid intervention, Persian immigration and European colonialism.

The historical value of the Book is uncertain. Cerulli was of the opinion that it would prove have some historical value. Neville Chittick also argued that it preserved authentic and accurate traditions of early Bantus in East Africa. Archaeological research has shed little light on the matter. Both versions of the Book and the similar Kawkab al-durriya li-akhbār Ifrīqiya have nearly identical accounts down to the 17th century, because they relied either on the same written sources or the same oral traditions. There is greater divergence in their accounts of more recent events. James Ritchie and Sigvard von Sicard give five reasons why the early history in the Book "may be more than mere fancy or legend", while acknowledging that further archaeological and historical research is needed to go beyond surmise.

Both versions begin with an account of the curse of Ham, before proceeding to the Sabaeans (9th–1st centuries BC) and Himyarites, including an account of the Year of the Elephant. It describes the tribes of the Kushūr, a Mijikenda people who lived in Shungwaya by the Juba River until forced south by the migrating Oromo; several waves of Arab immigration to East Africa, both before and after their conversion to Islam; and the arrival of the Portuguese under Vasco da Gama. The Book notes the great comets of 1830, 1844, 1845, 1854, 1860, 1861, 1882 and 1901. The K version ends with the death of Sultan Barghash bin Saʿīd of Zanzibar and the succession of Khalīfa bin Saʿīd in 1888. The L version ends with the death of Sultan Ḥamūd bin Muḥammad and the succession of ʿAlī bin Ḥamūd in 1902, noting that the latter was merely a nominal sovereign.

Richard F. Morton regarded the Book as a legal document for use by Islamic judges (qāḍīs), a view rejected by Chittick.

== Excerpt ==
The beginning of the redaction in manuscript K goes as follows:

In the Name of God the Merciful the Compassionate, and to him we call for help, this is the Book of the Zunūj and information about them on the shore of the Indian Ocean towards the West.

Praise be to God the Creator and Maker, the Loving, Possessor of Excellence, Generosity and Liberality, Who made for His creatures colours, white, red and black, and gave precedence to some over others in respect of lordship, extent [of rule] and happiness, and decreed for him whose father prayed against him blackness of face both for him and his offspring, and that they should be slaves to the offspring of his two sons. And prayers and peace be upon the Chosen One, Praiseworthy, and his family and his Companions, the people who bow and prostrate themselves.

And so we have summarized information about the Zunūj on the shore of the Indian Ocean towards the West, and the Equator, to make clear the Zanji inhabitants whom God created in it, who were on the Juba, that is, the Kushūr in the original Arabic speech and the WaNyika in the Swahili language; and information about the Arabs who came to the Zanj country and built houses in the districts and towns and villages, and dwelt in them from the time of the jāhiliyya . . .

== Bibliography ==
- Chittick, Neville (1976). "The Book of the Zenj and the Miji Kenda". International Journal of African Historical Studies. 9 (1): 68–73. JSTOR 217391.
- Ritchie, James McL.; von Sicard, Sigvard, eds. (2020). An Azanian Trio: Three East African Arabic Historical Documents. Brill.
