= Ali ibn al-Hassan Shirazi =

Founder and first ruler of the Kilwa Sultanate during c. 10th century

Sultan Ali ibn al-Hassan Shirazi (Persian: علي بن حسن شيرازی; c. 10th century) was the founder of the Kilwa Sultanate. According to legend, Ali ibn al-Hassan Shirazi was one of seven sons of the Emir Al-Hassan of Shiraz, Persia, his mother an Abyssinian slave. Upon his father's death, Ali was driven out of his inheritance by his warring brothers. Setting sail out of Hormuz, Ali ibn al-Hassan, his household and a small group of followers first made their way to Mogadishu, a commercial port on the East African coast. However, Ali failed to get along with the city's Somali elite and he was soon driven out of that city as well.

Steering down the African coast, Ali is said to have purchased the island of Kilwa from the local Bantu inhabitants. According to one chronicle, Kilwa was originally owned by a mainland Bantu king Almuli and connected by a small land bridge to the mainland that appeared in low tide. The king agreed to sell it to Ali ibn al-Hassan for as much colored cloth as could cover the circumference of the island. But when the king later changed his mind, and tried to take it back, they had dug up the land bridge, and Kilwa was now an island.

== See also ==
- Kilwa Sultanate
- Shirazi people
- Shirazi era
- Shiraz
- Swahili people

== Sources ==
- Horton, M. and J. Middleton (2000) The Swahili: the social landscape of a mercantile society, Oxford: Blackwell
