= Al-Hasan ibn Sulaiman =

Sultan of Kilwa
- Reign: 1310-1333
- Predecessor: Daud ibn Sulaiman (first reign)
- Successor: Daud ibn Sulaiman (second reign)
- Died: 1333
Names
- Abu al-Muzaffar Hasan Abu al-Mawahib ibn Sulaiman al-Mat'un ibn Hasan ibn Talut al-Mahdal
- House: Mahdali dynasty
- Father: Sulaiman ibn Hasan
- Religion: Sunni Islam

Sultan al-Hasan ibn Sulaiman (Arabic: الحسن بن سليمان), often referred to as "Abu al-Muwahib" ("father of gifts"), was a ruler of the Kilwa Sultanate, in present-day Tanzania, from 1310 until 1333. His full name was Abu al-Muzaffar Hasan Abu al-Muwahib ibn Sulaiman al-Mat'un ibn Hasan ibn Talut al-Mahdal. He was one of the most prosperous rulers of Kilwa before Portuguese contact, having been known for his generosity in addition to his military, economic, and architectural programs.

== Titles ==
Al-Hasan ibn Sulaiman was known to carry multiple titles corroborated by multiple sources during his reign. The most well known title "Abu al-Mawahib" meaning "father of gifts" was bestowed upon him for his generosity, and is known from the Kilwa chronicle and attested by ibn Battuta and gold coins attributed to him. Another well attested title was "al-Malik al-Mansur" meaning "the commander of the faithful and the victorious king," is known from a Husuni Kubwa inscription and confirmed on the gold coins dedicated to him. 2 further titles not found elsewhere are also noted on the gold coins, "Ashadd al-Din" ("strongest in the faith") and "Nasir al-Milla" ("helper of the religion").

== Early life ==
Al-Hasan ibn Sulaiman was born as the grandson of al-Hasan bin Talut the founder of the Mahdali dynasty of Yemeni Arab origin that usurped the Shirazi and ruled Kilwa. At a young age he had been sent to study in Aden while his grandfather was still ruling. While on the Hajj to Mecca his father who had been ruling passed away and al-Hasan ibn Sulaiman was next in line to rule but because of his absence his brother Daud ibn Sulaiman was put on the throne.

== Reign ==
When al-Hasan ibn Sulaiman returned to Kilwa Kisiwani after 2 years of Daud rule, his brother voluntarily stepped down in accordance to succession rights. After his death in 1333, Daud would return to rule.

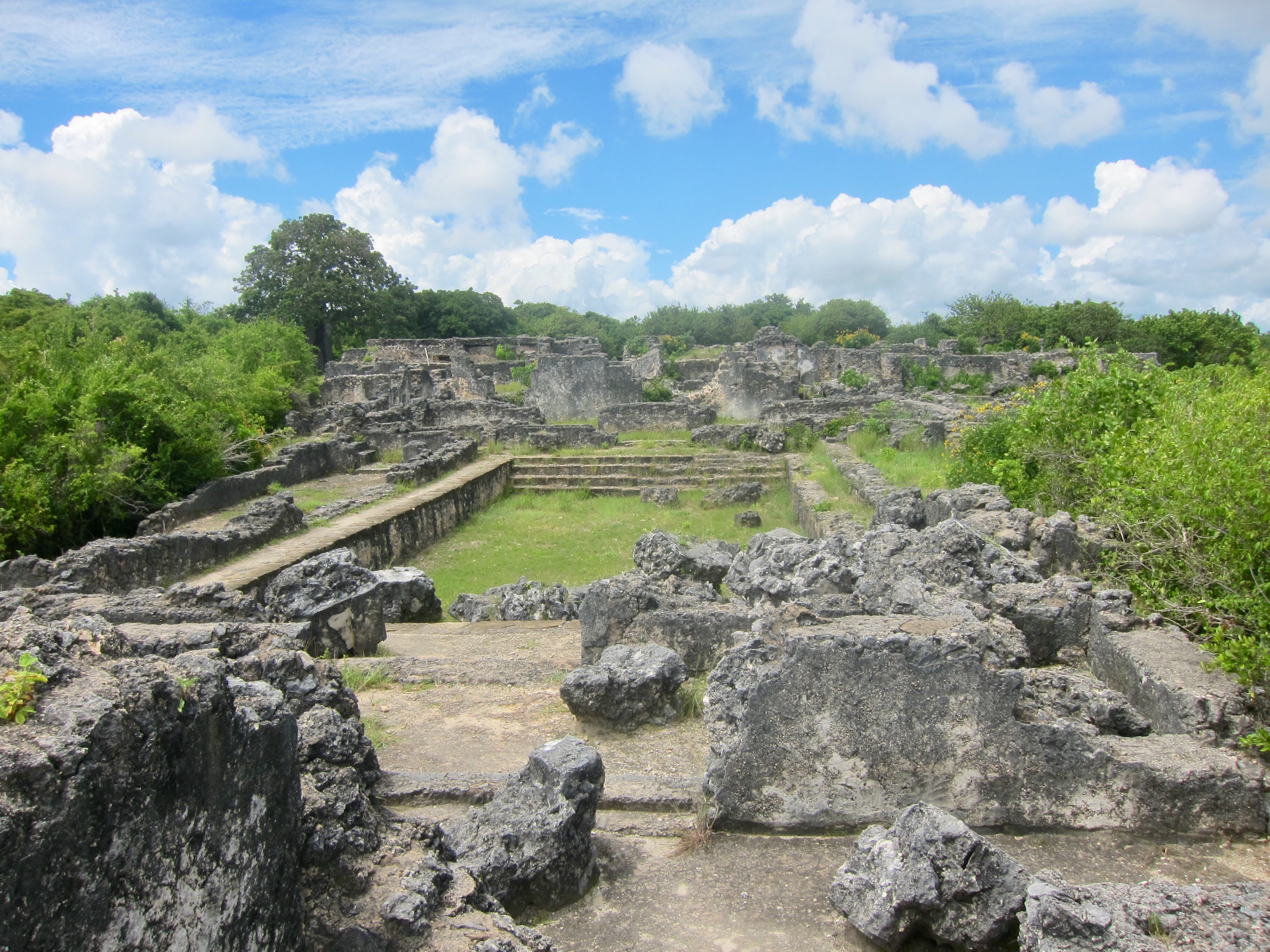
Husuni Kubwa, constructed during al-Hasan ibn Sulaiman's reign, the palace was never finished and was abandoned after the sultan's death but remained influential in future Kilwan architecture.

Al-Hasan ibn Sulaiman's reign was marked with prosperity, he had continued the copper coin minting program started by his grandfather and produced many coins that were used in local and international trade. In addition 3 gold coins dating to the 1320s have been found attributing to him, being the only known Kilwan ruler to mint gold coins. Al-Hasan ibn Sulaiman commissioned the construction of Husuni Kubwa which served as a palace for him and was also a royal warehouse and trade emporium although construction never finished during his reign. The north side of the palace contains an inscription dedicated to him, the inscription being one of the few in the city and the only inscription to name a ruler. It is also most likely that he commissioned Husuni Ndogo and an extension of the Great Mosque.

Al-Hasan ibn Sulaiman was ruling when ibn Battuta had visited the region and noted down the generosity of the sultan towards others, especially towards visitors with him even witnessing the sultan giving his robes to a poor man.

Militarily he had reconquered Mafia island which was traditionally under Kilwan control but had continued to be ruled by the Shirazi dynasty after the Mahdali usurpation. He was also reported by ibn Battuta to have raided the African mainland to pillage the non Muslim peoples and would set aside a substantial portion of these gains to donate to religious leaders that would visit from overseas.

== Legacy ==
Al-Hasan ibn Sulaiman was remembered in Kilwa memory as one of the greatest rulers before Portuguese contact, his portion of the Kilwa chronicle being one of the most extensive. His coin program was so extensive that future rulers after Daud for a time did not mint coins as they had continued to use his coins and let it circulate within their economy for hundreds of years while his gold coins were used to assert Kilwa's wealth on an international scale. Al-Hasan ibn Sulaiman's coins had circulated to far reaching places such as Great Zimbabwe and even Australia. His conquest of Mafia island was significant as it was traditionally viewed as legitimizing the Mahdali dynasty, fully conquering the Shirazi which was yet to be done by his predecessors and reestablishing Kilwan sovereignty over the island. Despite Husuni Kubwa never finishing and being abandoned after his reign the building was significant in bringing new architecture styles to Kilwa including domes and arched buildings which continued to be in use in the region for 200 years.

== See also ==
- Kilwa Sultanate
- Shirazi (ethnic group)
- Ali ibn al-Hassan Shirazi
