= Shirazi people =

Bantu ethnic group

Regions with significant populations
- Swahili coast (mainly Zanzibar, Pemba, Mafia, Comoros)

Languages
- Swahili varieties, English, French

Religion
- Predominantly Sunni Islam

Related ethnic groups
- Swahili people, Afro-Iranians

The Shirazi people, also known as Mbwera, are an ethnic group inhabiting the Swahili coast and the nearby Indian Ocean islands. They are particularly concentrated on the islands of Zanzibar, Pemba, and Comoros.

Though the origins of the Shirazi people are controversial, they are heavily associated with the spread of Islam on the Swahili Coast, the establishment of the southern Swahili sultanates like Mozambique and Angoche, and opulent wealth. They were commercially based in the East African coastal area and adjacent areas, and were influential in the development of the Swahili language.

== History ==
=== Background ===
Arab geographers from the twelfth and later centuries historically divided the eastern coast of Africa into several regions based on each region's respective inhabitants. According to the twelfth century geography of Al-Idrisi, completed in 1154 CE, there were four littoral zones: Barbar (Bilad al Barbar; "land of the Berbers") in the Horn of Africa, which was inhabited by Somalis and stretched southward to the Shebelle river; Zanj (Ard al-Zanj; "country of the blacks"), located immediately below that up to around Tanga or the southern part of Pemba island; Sofala (Ard Sufala), extending from Pemba to an unknown terminus, but probably around the Limpopo river; and Waq-Waq, the shadowy land south thereof. However, earlier geographers make no mention of Sofala. The texts written after twelfth century also call the island of Madagascar al-Qumr, and include it as a part of Waq-Waq.

=== Early Islam in East Africa and connections to "Shiraz" ===
Islam was introduced to the northern Somalia coast early on from the Arabian peninsula, shortly after the hijra. Zeila's two-mihrab Masjid al-Qiblatayn dates to the 7th century, and is the oldest mosque in the city. In the late 9th century, Al-Yaqubi wrote that Muslims were already living along this northern littoral. He also mentioned that the Adal Sultanate had its capital in the city. Ibn al-Mujawir later wrote that, due to various battles in the Arabian peninsula, Banu Majid people from Yemen settled in the central Mogadishu area. Yaqut and Ibn Said described the city as another important center of Islam, which actively traded with the Swahili-speaking African region to the south of it. The thirteenth century texts also mention mosques and individuals with names such as "al-Shirazi" and "al-Sirafi" and a clan called "Sirafi at Merca", suggestive of an early Persian presence in the area.

Another set of records are found in the Book of the Zanj (Kitab al-Zanuj), a likely compilation of mythical oral traditions and memories of settled traders on the Swahili coast. The late 19th-century document claims that Persians and Arabs were sent by governors of the Persian Gulf region to conquer and colonize the trading coast of East Africa. It also mentions the establishment of the Shirazi dynasty by Madagan and Halawani Arab merchants, whose identity and roots are unclear. According to R. F. Morton, a critical assessment of the Book of the Zanj indicates that much of the document consists of deliberate falsifications by its author Fathili bin Omari, which were intended to invalidate the established oral traditions of local Bantu groups. The Kitab's ascription of Arabian origins for the founders of Malindi and other settlements on the Swahili coast is also contradicted by recorded 19th-century clan and town traditions, which instead emphasize that these early Shirazi settlers were of Persian ancestral heritage.

=== Persian Merchants & Migration ===
Swahili elites, many of whom had extensive trade connections with Arabia, Persia, and India fashioned themselves as a quintessential Muslim aristocracy. This demanded fictive or real genealogies that linked them back to early Muslims in Arabia or Persia, something seen in many parts of the Islamic World. It was also common for Arab, Persian, and Indian traders to "winter" on the coast for up to six months as the monsoon winds shifted. They would often marry the daughters of Swahili traders, passing on their genealogy through Islam's patrilineal descent system. The archaeological record firmly refutes any supposition of mass migrations or colonization but evidences extensive trade relations with Persia. Trade links with the Persian Gulf were especially prominent from the 10th to 14th centuries, which prompted the development of local mythologies of Persian or Shirazi origin. According to Abdulaziz Lodhi, the Iranians and Arabs called the Swahili coast Zangistan or Zangibar, which literally means "the Black Coast", and the Muslim immigrants from South Asia (modern Pakistan and India) to southern Arabian lands such as Oman and Yemen identified themselves as a Shirazi. The Muslim Shirazi settlements on the Swahili coast maintained a close relationship with those on islands such as Comoros, through marriage and mercantile networks. According to Tor Sellström, the Comorian population profile has a large proportion of Arab and African heritage, particularly on Grande Comore and Anjouan and these were under Shirazi sultanates.

=== Early modern era ===
The contact of Shirazi people with colonial Europeans started with the arrival in Kilwa sultanate of Vasco da Gama, the Portuguese explorer, in 1498. A few years later, the Portuguese and Shirazi people entered into disputes regarding trading routes and rights particularly about gold, a conflict that destroyed both Kilwa and Mombasa port towns of Shirazi rulers. The Portuguese military power and direct trading with India in the beginning, followed by other European powers, led to a rapid decline of the Shirazi towns which thrived and depended primarily on the trade. In parallel to European competition, non-Swahili-speaking Bantu groups began attacking Shirazi towns in the sixteenth and seventeenth centuries. Thus, the Shirazi sultanates faced war from sea and land, leading to a rapid loss of power and trading facilities. The Omani Arabs re-asserted their military in the seventeenth century, and they defeated the Portuguese in 1698, at Mombasa. The Portuguese agreed to cede this part of Africa, and a fresh migration of Arabs from Oman and Yemen into the Shirazi people settlements followed.

=== Contemporary demography ===
Some towns and islands have had a much larger concentration of Shirazi people. For example, in 1948, about 56% of the Zanzibar population reported Shirazi ancestry of Persian origins. In local elections, the Shirazi voted for whichever party was politically expedient, whether the ethnic minority-supported Zanzibar Nationalist Party or the mainland Tanzania-associated Afro-Shirazi Party.

== Religion ==
Today, most people along the Swahili coast follow the Shafi'i madhhab of Sunni Islam.

== Language ==
Like most of the Swahili people, the Shirazi speak local dialects of the Swahili language as a mother tongue. It belongs to the Bantu branch of the Niger-Congo family. However, the dialects of Swahili language is best described as a syncretic language, that blended Sabaki Bantu, Comoro, Pokomo, Persian, English, Arabic and Indian words and structure reflecting the syncretic fusion of people from diverse backgrounds that form the Shirazi people.

Comorian is divided into two language groups, a western group composed of Shingazidja and Shimwali, and an eastern group, composed of Shindzwani and Shimaore. Shingazidja is spoken on Ngazidja, and has around 312,000 total speakers. Shindzwani is spoken on Ndzwani, and has roughly 275,000 total speakers. Shimaore is spoken on Mayotte, and has an estimated 136,500 total speakers. Shimwali is spoken on Mwali, and has about 28,700 total speakers.

Speakers of the Comorian languages use a modified version of the Arabic script as their writing system.

== Society and culture ==
The Shirazi people have primarily been a mercantile community, thriving on trade. Initially, between the 10th and 12th centuries, it was the gold producing regions of Mozambique that brought them to the coast of Africa. Later the trading in African slaves, ivory, spices, silk, and produce from clove, coconut, and other plantations run with slave labor became the mainstay of the trading activity. These African slaves were captured during inland raids. Their presence in Swahili towns is mentioned in fourteenth and fifteenth century memoirs of Islamic travelers such as that of the fourteenth century explorer Ibn Battuta. The Shirazi were a large supplier of these slaves to the colonial era European plantations and various Sultanates. According to August Nimtz, after international slave trading was banned, the Shirazi community was economically crippled.

The arrival of Islam affected the Shirazi identity and social structures in many ways. According to Helena Jerman, the word "Sawahil" among the Shirazi people referred to "free but landless" strata of the society who had adopted Islam, then a new social category on the Swahili coast. Among the Muslims, this was the lowest social strata of free people, just above the slave strata. Along with the Wa-shirazi strata, there were other strata, such as the Wa-arabu, Wa-manga, Wa-shihiri, Wa-shemali, and the noble pure Muslim ruler category called Wa-ungwana. The social strata of the Shirazi people came with its own strata taboos and privileges. For example, the upper strata Waungwana (also called Swahili-Arabs) had the exclusive right to build prestigious stone houses, and Waungwana men practiced polygynous hypergamy, that is father children with low status and slave women. The ritual and sexual purity of the Waungwana women were maintained by confining them to certain premises within these houses, called Ndani.

According to Michel Ben Arrous and Lazare Ki-Zerbo, the Shirazi society has been "fractured by the caste implications of race and class". As the Arabs who arrived from the Arabian lands became slave owners and traders, they considered their slaves as inferior and unfit for Islam. The slave girls were concubines, who bore them children. The male offspring were considered Muslims, but the female offspring inherited their slavery and their non-Muslim heritage. Even in post-colonial society, the residual dynamics and distinctions of a racial caste system have remained among some Shirazi people. According to the sociologist Jonas Ewald and other scholars, the social stratification is not limited in the Shirazi society to racial lines, but extends to economic status and the region of origin.

The Afro-Shirazi culture is Islamic in nature. There are also Bantu influences, such as the Swahili language.

According to G. Thomas Burgess, Ali Sultan Issa, and Seif Sharif Hamad, many Africans "claimed Shirazi identity to obscure their slave ancestry, to mark their status as landowners, or to gain access to World War II rations distributed by the colonial state along ethnic lines." Shirazi consider themselves as of Persian ancestry primarily, and regard themselves as not related to Arabs or recent labor migrants from mainland Africa.

== Genetics ==
Genetic analysis by Msadie et al. (2010) indicates that the most common paternal lineages among the contemporary Comorian population, which includes Shirazi people, are clades that are frequent in sub-Saharan Africa (E1b1a1-M2 (41%) and E2-M90 (14%)). The samples also contain some northern Y chromosomes, indicating possible paternal ancestry from South Iran (E1b1b-V22, E1b1b-M123, F*(xF2, GHIJK), G2a, I, J1, J2, L1, Q1a3, R1*, R1a*, R1a1, and R2 (29.7%)), and Southeast Asia (O1 (6%)). The Comorians also predominantly bear mitochondrial haplogroups linked with sub-Saharan East African populations in East and South East Africa (L0, L1, L2 and L3′4(xMN) (84.7%)), with the remaining maternal clades associated with Southeast Asia (B4a1a1-PM, F3b, and M7c1c (10.6%), and M(xD, E, M1, M2, M7) (4%)) but no Middle Eastern lineages. According to Msadie et al., given that there are no common Middle Eastern maternal haplogroups on the Comoros, there is "striking evidence for male-biased gene flow from the Middle East to the Comoros", which is "entirely consistent with male-dominated trade and religious proselytisation being the forces that drove the Middle Eastern gene flow to the Comoros".

== See also ==
- Indian Ocean slave trade
- Zanzibar slave trade
- Comoros slave trade
- Afro-Shirazi Party
- Kilwa Sultanate
- Kizimkazi Mosque
- Shirazis of the Comoros
- Shirazi era
- Shirazi, Kenya
- Sultan al-Hasan ibn Sulaiman
- Tongoni Ruins
- Tumbatu
- Zanj

== Bibliography ==
- Allen, James De Vere (1993). Swahili Origins: Swahili Culture & the Shungwaya Phenomenon. James Currey Publishers. ISBN 9780852550755.
- Bakari, Mohammed Ali (2001). The Democratisation Process in Zanzibar: A Retarded Transition. GIGA-Hamburg. ISBN 9783928049719.
- Chittick, Neville (1965). "The 'Shirazi' Colonization of East Africa". Journal of African History. 6 (3). Cambridge University Press: 275–294. doi:10.1017/S0021853700005806. JSTOR 180168. S2CID 162802132.
- Horton, Mark; Middleton, John (2000). The Swahili: The Social Landscape of a Mercantile Society. Wiley-Blackwell. ISBN 9780631189190.
- Nimtz, August H. (1980). Islam and Politics in East Africa: The Sufi Order in Tanzania. University of Minnesota Press. ISBN 9781452910413.
- Pouwels, Randall L. (1984). "Oral Historiography and the Shirazi of the East African Coast". History in Africa. 11. African Studies Association: 237–267. doi:10.2307/3171636. JSTOR 3171636. S2CID 161321160.
- Pouwels, Randall L. (2002). Horn and Crescent: Cultural Change and Traditional Islam on the East African Coast, 800-1900. Cambridge University Press. ISBN 9780521523097.
- Sheriff, Abdul; Tominaga, Chizuko (1990). "The Ambiguity of Shirazi Ethnicity in the History and Politics of Zanzibar". Christianity and Culture. 24. Sendai: 1–37.
- Spear, Thomas (1984). "The Shirazi in Swahili Traditions, Culture, and History". History in Africa. 11. African Studies Association: 291–305. doi:10.2307/3171638. JSTOR 3171638. S2CID 162212370.
