= Kilwa Chronicle =

African chronicle about the origins of the Swahili city-state of Kilwa

The Kilwa Chronicle is a text, believed to be based on oral tradition, that describes the origins of the Swahili city-state of Kilwa, located on an Indian Ocean island near the East African coast. It recounts the genealogy of the rulers of the Kilwa Sultanate, following the foundation of the city by Persians from Shiraz and Hormuz in the tenth century until the arrival of the Portuguese in the sixteenth century. Subsequent ancient DNA studies have confirmed much of the basis of these stories to be true. However, even with the DNA studies, some have said that these works were modified for political gain.

Two sources of the Chronicle exist: the Kitāb al-Sulwa in Arabic and a Portuguese version that is a section of the book Décadas da Ásia by the historian João de Barros. The genealogical account is similar in both versions, but other details vary substantially.

== Sources ==
- João de Barros (1552) Décadas da Ásia: Dos feitos, que os Portuguezes fizeram no descubrimento, e conquista, dos mares, e terras do Oriente., Dec. I, Lib. 8, Cap. 6 (p. 223ff)
- Strong, S. Arthur (1895) "The History of Kilwa, edited from an Arabic MS", Journal of the Royal Asiatic Society, January (No volume number), pp. 385–431. online
