= Felix A. Chami =

Tanzanian archaeologist

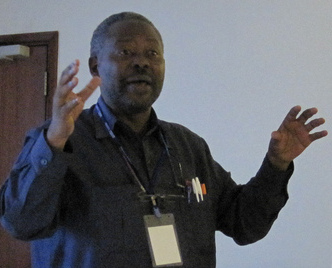
- Professor Felix Chami, 2010
- Occupation: Archaeologist
- Known for: Africa Archaeology Explorations

Academic background
- Education: University of Dar Es Salaam; Brown University; Uppsala University

Academic work
- Discipline: Archaeology
- Institutions: University of Dar Es Salaam

Felix A. Chami is an archaeologist from Tanzania. He is a professor at the University of Dar es Salaam, focusing on East African coastal archaeology. Dr. Chami discovered, on the island of Mafia and Juani, artifacts that revealed East Africa as being integral to the Indian Ocean trade. Chami earned a first degree in sociology from the University of Dar es Salaam in 1986, a master's degree in anthropology from Brown University in 1988 and a Ph.D. in archaeology from Uppsala University in 1994.

== Published works ==
- Unity of African Ancient History: 3000 BC to AD 500 (2006)
- Climate Change, Trade and Modes of Production in Sub-Saharan Africa (2003) (Editor)
- People, Contacts and the Environment in the African Past (2001) (with Gilbert Pwiti and Chantal Radimilahy)
- Historical Archaeology of Bagamoyo: Excavations at the Caravan-Serai (2000) (with Eliwasa Maro, Jane Kessy and Simon Odunga)
- The Tanzanian Coast in the First Millennium AD (1994)
