= Ibn al-Mujawir =

Medieval muslim traveller

- أبو الفتح جمال الدين يوسف بن يعقوب ابن محمد
- Born: c. 1205
- Died: 1292
- Occupations: Geographer, Traveler, businessman
- Notable work: Tarikh al-Mustansir

Abu al-Fath Jamal al-Din Yusuf bin Yaqoub bin Muhammad Al Shaybani Al Dimashqi (Arabic: أبو الفتح جمال الدين يوسف بن يعقوب ابن محمد), better known as Ibn al-Mujawir (c. 1205–1292) was a Yemeni historian, traveler and businessman. He is known for his travelogue Tarikh al-Mustabsir or Tarikh al-Mustansir (Chronicle of an intelligent observer), a travel chronicle describing cities, commerce, local dynasties and social mores of the southern Arabian Peninsula. The chronicle is an important source for the economic history and popular life of the southern areas of the Arabian Peninsula and the isle of Socotra in the early 13th century.

He travelled from Mecca south through the Red Sea, and along the southern coast of the Arabian Peninsula to the Persian Gulf. In Aden, at that time at the beginning of its medieval prosperity under the Ayyubids, he observed the activities of the port to report on its administration, taxes, markets, customs, currency, weights and measures. His route then continued along the southern coast of Arabia, where he described the historical connections of the Gulf of Aden to India adapting the Indian epic of the Ramayana.

He described the habits of the people: buildings, dress, agriculture, food and history. He also had an ear for their manners, tales and myths. He described maritime contacts between Madagascar, the East African coast, Aden and Siraf, the Persian golf port. He mapped cities in the style of the Balkhi school.
