= Shirazi era =

Mythic origin in the history of Southeast Africa

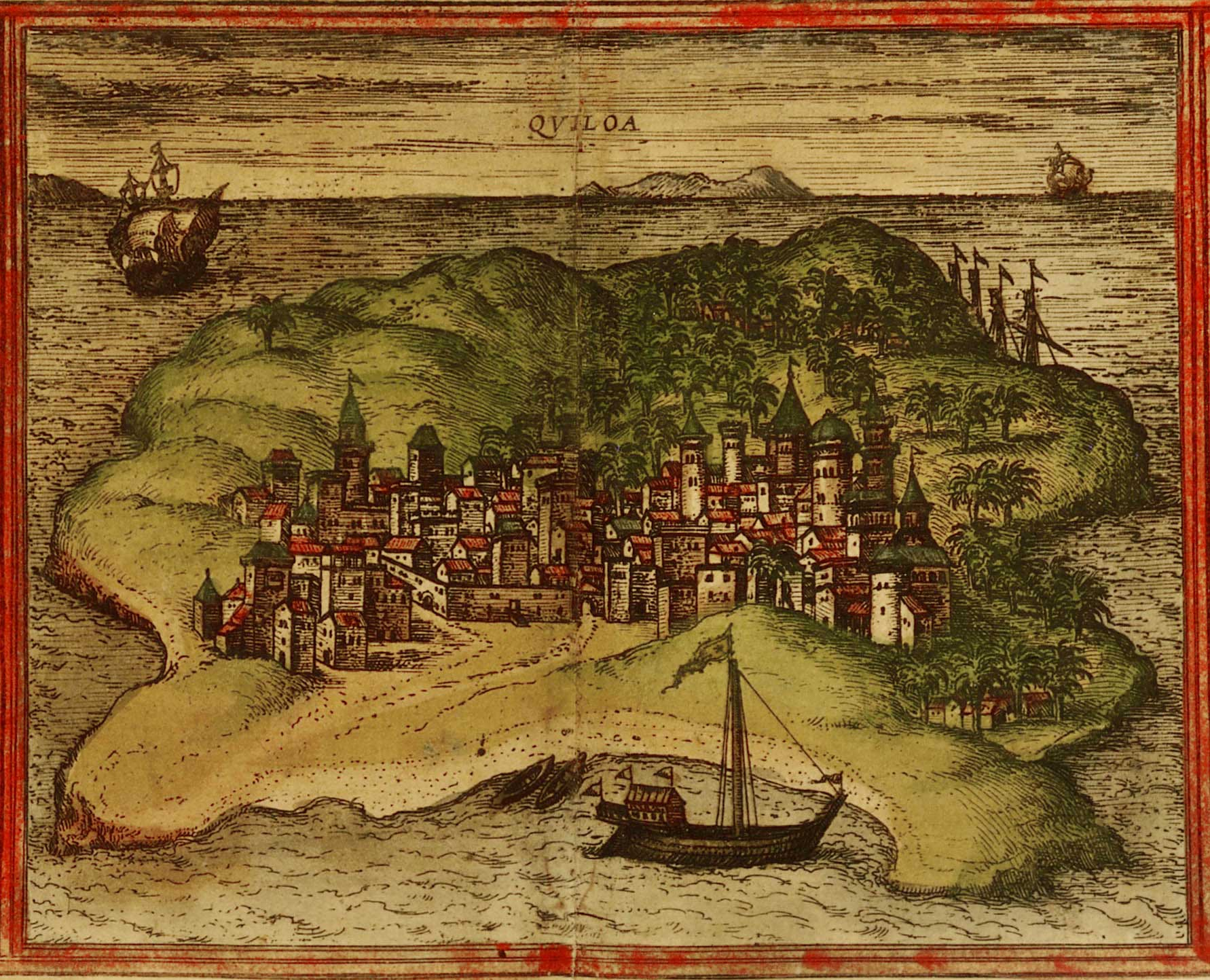
Kilwa Kisiwani, on the Tanzanian coast. From Civitates orbis terrarum vol. I, by Georg Braun and Franz Hogenberg, 1572

The "Shirazi era" refers to a mythic origin in the history of Southeast Africa (and especially Tanzania), between the 13th century and 15th century, as recorded in the 15th century Kilwa Chronicle, where many towns were founded by Persians from the Shiraz region "between the eighth and fifteenth centuries".

21st century advances in population genetics have yielded support for the traditional narrative. Although the maternal heritage of the present and pre-modern population is principally of Sub-Saharan lineages, primarily Bantu and Pastoral Neolithic, the majority of the male heritage, in the coastal settlements (Swahili coast), is of Asian origin, with 80–90% of the Asian DNA originating from Persian men. The identified Y-DNA haplogroups found are those most common to Persian-domianted West Asia, with the typically non-African J2, G2, and R1a haplogroups being most frequent in the samples.

== History ==
The most likely origin for the stories about the Shirazi is from Muslim inhabitants of the Lamu Archipelago who moved south in the 10th and 11th centuries. They brought with them a coinage tradition and localized form of Islam. These Africans migrants seem to have developed a concept of Shirazi origin as they moved further southwards, near Malindi and Mombasa, along the Mrima coast. The longstanding trade connections with the Persian Gulf gave credence to these myths. In addition, because most Muslim societies are patrilineal, one can claim distant identities through paternal lines regardless of the composition of the majority of one's ancestry. The so-called Shirazi tradition represents the arrival of Islam in these eras, one reason it has proven so long lasting.

Extant mosques and coins demonstrate that the "Shirazi" were not immigrants from West Asia, but northern Swahili Muslims. They moved south, founding mosques, introducing coinage and elaborately carved inscriptions and mihrabs. They should be interpreted as indigenous African Muslims who played the politics of the Islamicate World to their advantage. Some still use this foundation myth a millennium later to assert their authority, even though the myth's context has long been forgotten.

The Shirazi legend took on new importance in the 19th century, during the period of Omani domination. Claims of Persian Shirazi ancestry were used to distance locals from Arab newcomers. The emphasis that the Shirazi came very long ago and intermarried with indigenous locals ties this claim to the creation of convincing indigenous narratives about Swahili heritage without divorcing it from the ideals of being a maritime-centered culture.

== Heritage ==
Two of the most important archeological sites are that of Kaole, north of Dar es Salaam, and Kilwa, where the remains of some of the oldest mosques in Southeast Africa can be found.

== See also ==
- Ali ibn al-Hassan Shirazi
- Shirazi people
- History of Tanzania
