= Siyu =

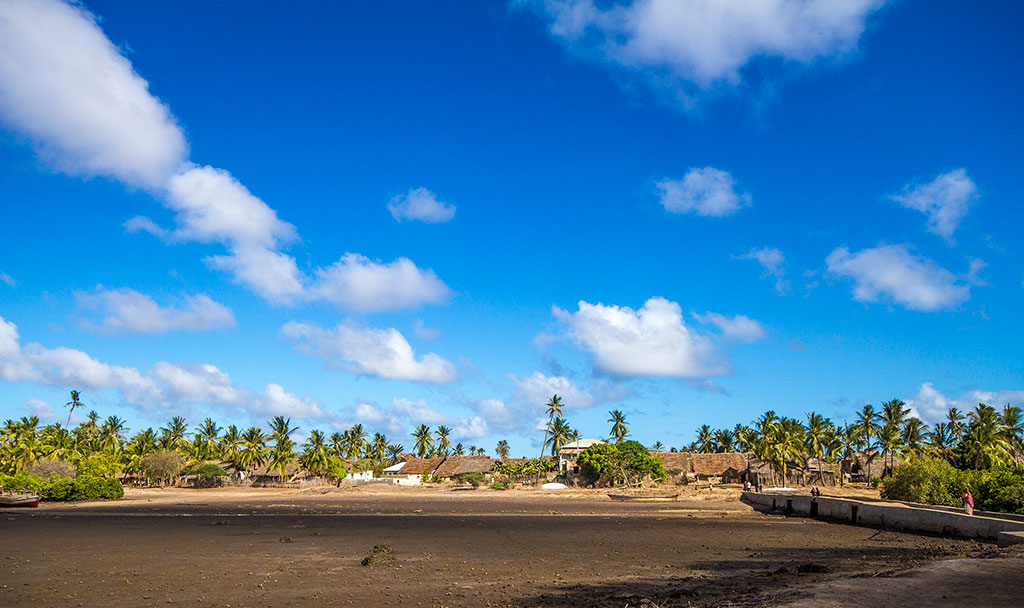
- Siyu town at low tide.
- Country: Kenya
- Province: Coast Province
- Time zone: UTC+3 (EAT)

Siyu is a settlement on the north coast of Pate Island, within the Lamu Archipelago in Kenya's Coast Province.

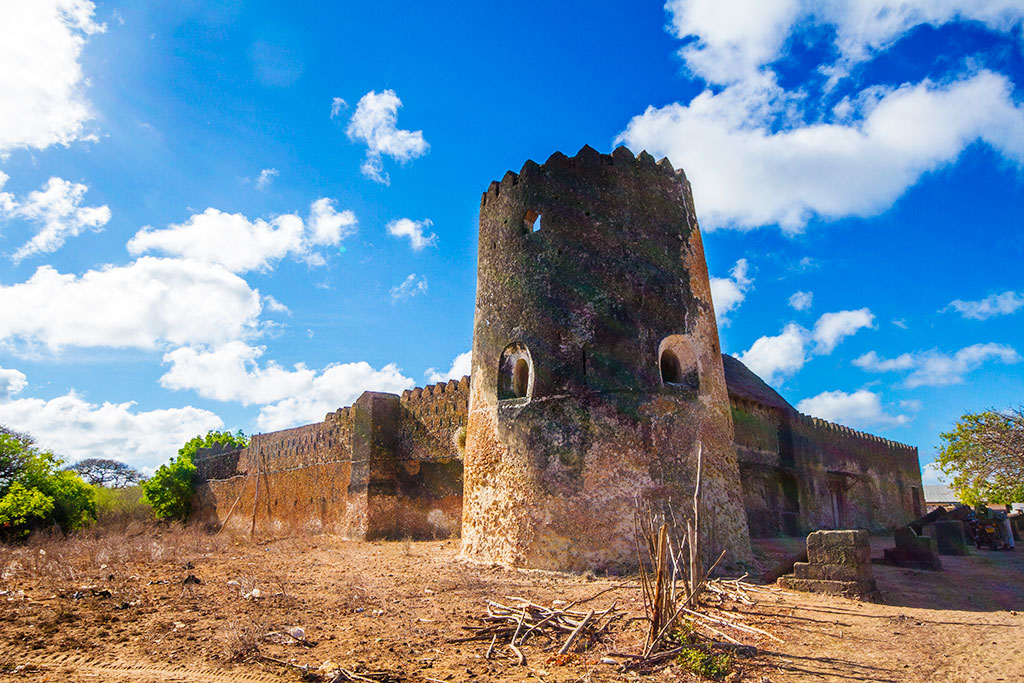
Siyu Fort on Pate island

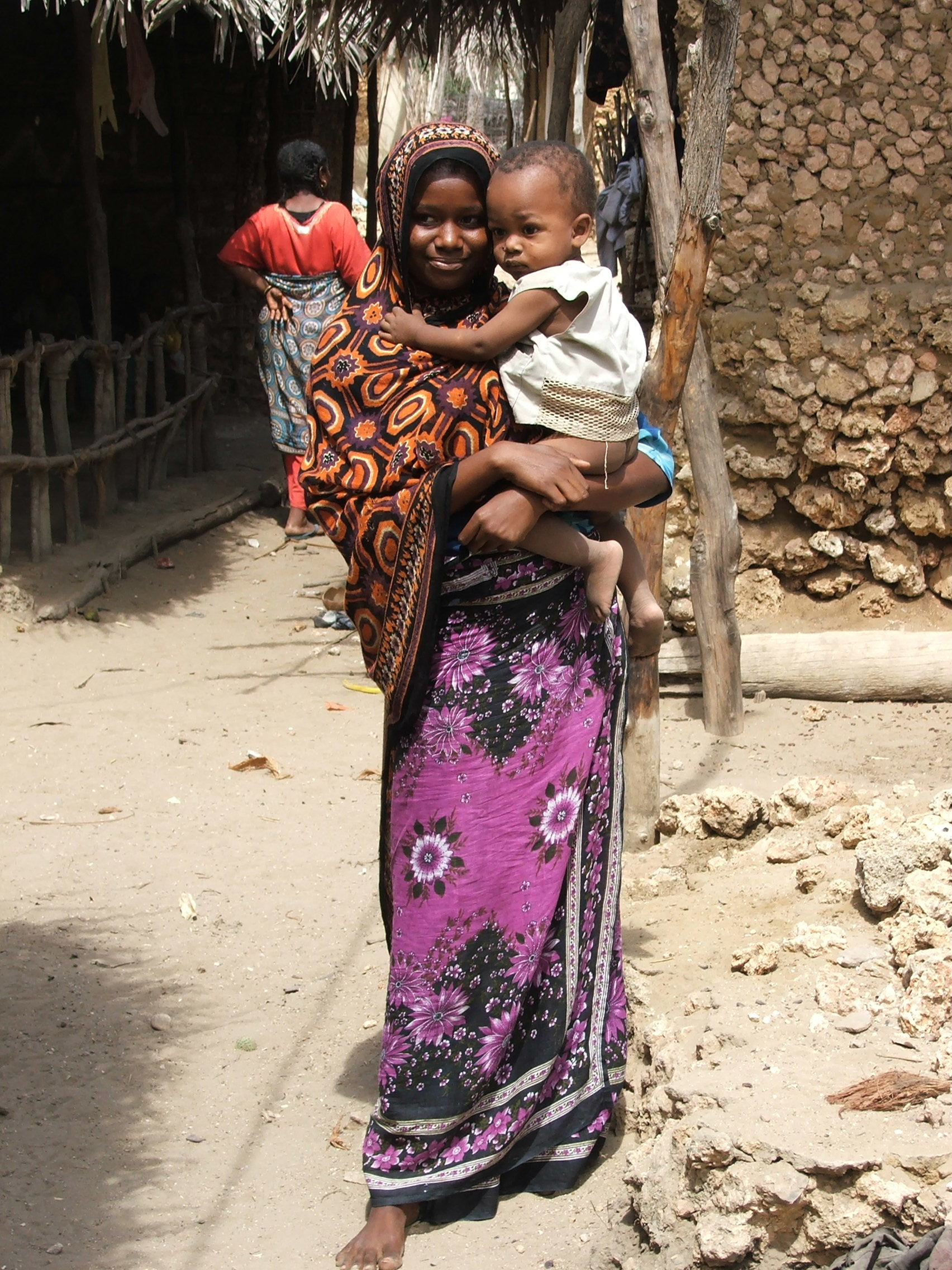
Woman wearing a kanga from Siyu

The age of Siyu is not known, but it might date from the 13th century. The first inhabitants of Siyu were Watikuu and Somali from Dondo and Burkao.

There are some other accounts that mention Chinese ships of Zheng He's fleet sinking near Lamu Island in Kenya in 1415. Survivors settled on the island and married local women. This has been proven recently by archaeological work on the island that has resulted in the finding of evidence to suggest this connection. Further DNA testing done on some residents from Siyu show that they indeed have Chinese ancestors.

Gaspar de Santo Bernadino visited the town in 1606, and stated that it was the largest town on the island. Following the formation of close ties with a new wave of Somali settlers in the 1700s, the Famao patricians agreed to a diarchy for the rule of Siyu, with power shared between a Famao patrician and a Somali shaykh. This alliance allowed the Famao to share the Somali shaykhs’ reputation for piety, learning, and religious authority, and the shaykhs are credited with initiating an era of Islamic renaissance in Siyu, during which the town became a renowned centre of Islamic learning and book production.

Siyu's main claim to historical fame is that it through several battles withstood the sultans of Zanzibar. In 1843 the sheikh of Siyu, Bwana Mataka, and the new sheikh of Pate, repudiated the sovereignty of Seyyid Said, Sultan of Oman and Zanzibar. In response, Seyyid Said assembled an army consisting of 2000 people from Muscat, Baluchistan and Lamu. Leading them was his relative General Seyyid Hamad bin Ahmed Al-Busaidy, known as Amir Hamad. He had previously been Governor of Bandar Abbas (in 1824). He landed at Faza in early January 1844. On January the 6th they moved towards Siyu, but were ambushed and forced back to Faza. After three weeks without victory Amir Hamad sailed off.

In 1845 Siyu gave Seyyid Said one of his greatest military defeats. When Siyu finally succumbed to Zanzibar's dominance, under Sultan Majid in 1863, it was one of the last towns on the whole of East Africa's coast to do so.

Siyu Fort is in interesting artefact in that it is a fort built by locals, not by foreigners. It is constructed of coral. Locals are known for their leather-craft.

== See also ==
- Historic Swahili Settlements
- Swahili architecture
- Lamu Fort

== Bibliography ==
- Eliot, Charles (1966). The East African Protectorate. Routledge. ISBN 0-7146-1661-3.
- Engel, Ulf; Ramos, Manuel João (17 May 2013). African Dynamics in a Multipolar World. BRILL. ISBN 978-90-04-25650-7.
- Martin, Chryssee MacCasler Perry and Esmond Bradley Martin: Quest for the Past. An historical guide to the Lamu Archipelago. 1973.
