= Kilwa Sultanate =

Swahili sultanate (957–1513)

Kilwa Sultanate أُسُلتَانِ وَ كِيلوَ Usultani wa Kilwa
- 957–1513
- Flag

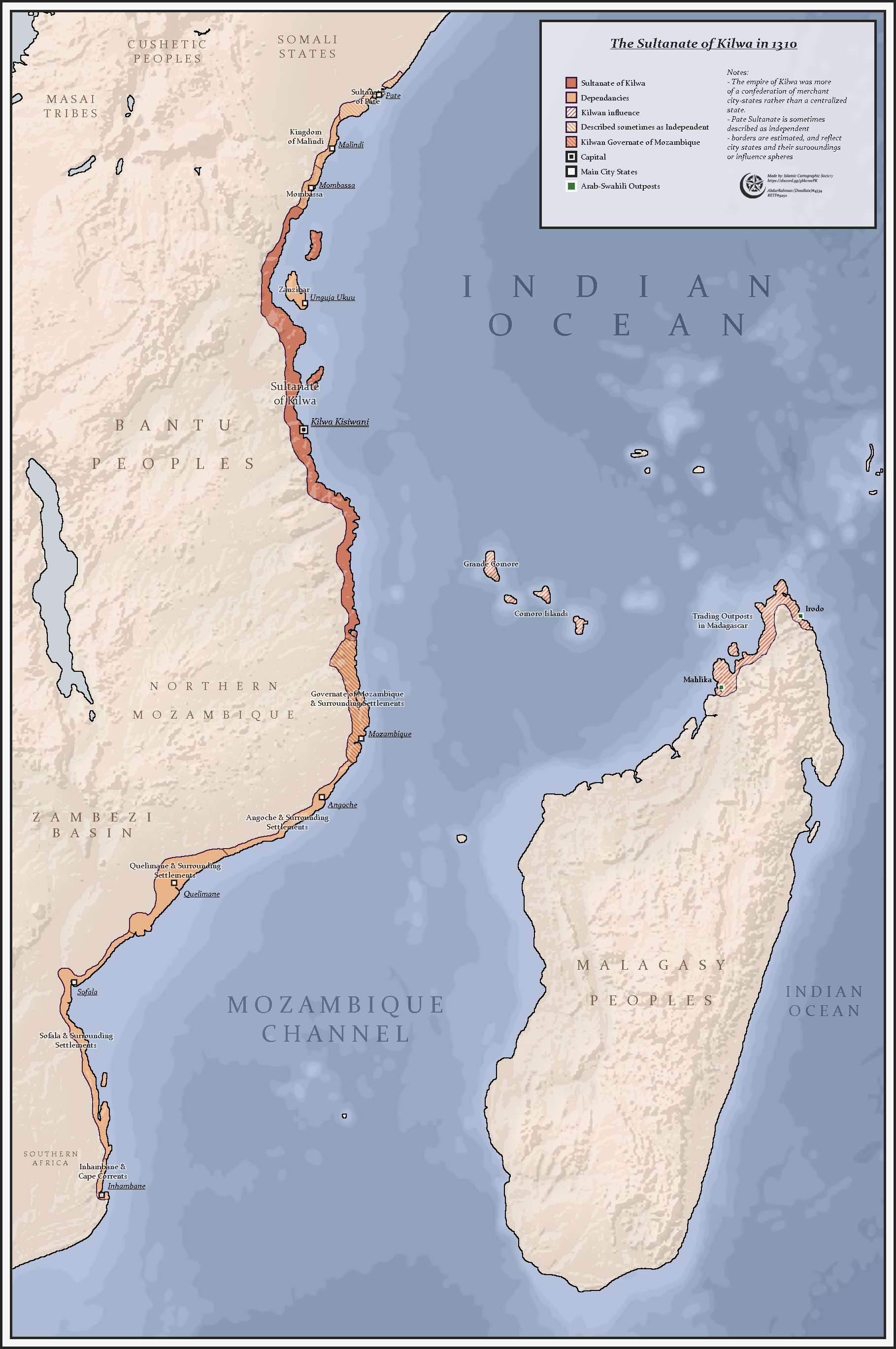
- The Sphere of the Sultanate in 1310
- Location: Swahili coast
- Capital: Kilwa Kisiwani
- Common languages: Persian (Elite, court language) Arabic (Religious texts and court language ) Swahili (de facto language of the sultanate)
- Ethnic groups: Swahili; Mijikenda; Hadimu; Shirazi; Bajuni; Pokomo; Karanga
- Religion: Sunni Islam; School: Shafi'i
- Government: Sultanate
- Sultan
  - 957: Ali ibn al-Hassan Shirazi
  - 1310: Al-Hasan ibn Sulaiman
  - 1499: Ibrahim ibn Suleiman
- Historical era: Shirazi era
  - Established: 957
  - Disestablished: 1513
Preceded by	Succeeded by
Swahili culture	Portuguese Empire; Sultanate of Zanzibar
- Today part of: Kenya; Tanzania; Mozambique; Madagascar; Comoros

The Kilwa Sultanate was a sultanate, centered at Kilwa (an island off modern-day, Kilwa District in Lindi Region of Tanzania), whose authority, at its height, stretched over the entire length of the Swahili Coast. According to the legend, it was founded in the 10th century by Ali ibn al-Hassan Shirazi, a Persian prince of Shiraz.

== History ==
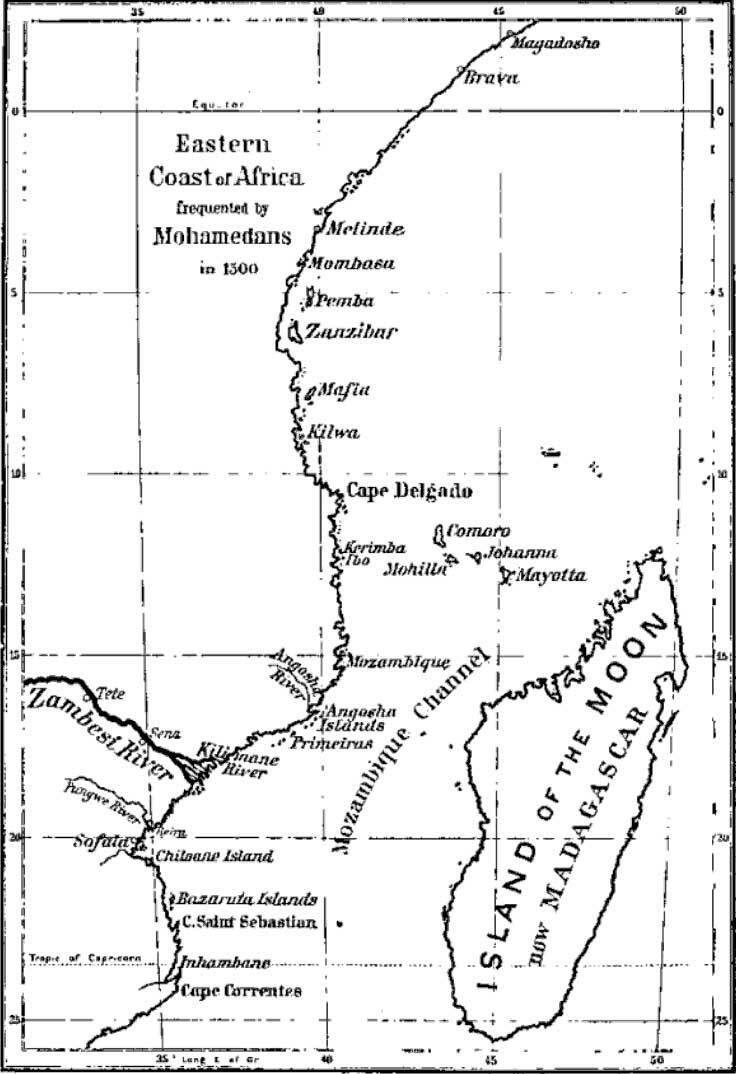
Principal cities of East Africa, c. 1500. The Kilwa Sultanate held overlordship from Cape Correntes in the south to Malindi in the north.

The history of the Kilwa Sultanate begins around 960–1000 AD. According to legend, Ali ibn al-Hassan Shirazi was one of seven sons of a ruler of Shiraz, Persia, his mother an Abyssinian slave. Upon his father's death, Ali was driven out of his inheritance by his brothers. Setting sail out of Hormuz, Ali ibn al-Hassan, his household and a small group of followers first made their way to Mogadishu, the main commercial city of the East African coast. However, Ali failed to get along with the city's Somali elite and he was soon driven out of that city as well.

Steering down the African coast, Ali is said to have purchased the island of Kilwa from the local Bantu inhabitants. According to one chronicle (Strong (1895)), Kilwa was originally owned by a mainland Bantu king 'Almuli' and connected by a small land bridge to the mainland that appeared in low tide. The king agreed to sell it to Ali ibn al-Hassan for as much colored cloth as could cover the circumference of the island. But when the king later changed his mind, and tried to take it back, the Persians had dug up the land bridge, and Kilwa was now an island.

A genetic study, published on March 29, 2023, confirmed the presence of significant Iranian-origin ancestry in the Y-chromosomal DNA of medieval inhabitants of the Swahili Coast, strongly supporting elements of the Persian-admixture narrative.

Kilwa's fortuitous position made it a much better East African trade center than Mogadishu. It quickly began to attract many merchants and immigrants from further north, including Persia and Arabia. In just a few years, the city was big enough to establish a satellite settlement at nearby Mafia Island.

Kilwa's emergence as a commercial center challenged the dominance once held by Mogadishu over the East African coast. Suleiman Hassan, the ninth successor of Ali (and 12th ruler of Kilwa, c. 1178–1195), wrested control of the southerly city of Sofala from the Mogadishans. Wealthy Sofala was the principal entrepot for the gold and ivory trade with Great Zimbabwe and Monomatapa in the interior. The acquisition of Sofala brought a windfall of gold revenues to the Kilwa Sultans, which allowed them to finance their expansion and extend their powers all along the East African coast.

At the end of the 13th century Kilwa came under the control of the Mahdali dynasty of Yemeni Arab origin, which built the Husuni Kubwa palace in the 14th century.

At the zenith of its power in the 15th century, the Kilwa Sultanate owned or claimed overlordship over the mainland cities of Malindi, Lamu, Inhambane, and Sofala and the island-states of Mombasa, Pemba, Zanzibar, Mafia, Comoro, and Mozambique (plus numerous smaller places) – essentially what is now often referred to as the "Swahili Coast".

Kilwa also claimed lordship across the channel over the myriad of small trading posts scattered on the coast of Madagascar (then known by its Arabic name of Island of the Moon). To the north, Kilwa's power was checked by the independent Somali city-state of Mogadishu (the once-dominant city, Kilwa's main rival) and the Adal Sultanate (the Muslim Sultanate located in the Horn of Africa). To the south, Kilwa's reach extended as far as Cape Correntes, below which merchant ships did not usually dare sail.

While a single figure, the Sultan of Kilwa, stood at the top of the hierarchy, the Kilwa Sultanate was not a centralized state. It was more a confederation of commercial cities, each with its own internal elite, merchant communities and trade connections. The Sultan might appoint a governor or overseer, but even his authority was not consistent – in some places (e.g. outposts like Mozambique Island) he was a true governor in the Sultan's name, whereas in more established cities like Sofala, his powers were much more limited, more akin to an ambassador to the city than its governor.

== Society and economy ==
Despite its origin as a Persian colony, extensive inter-marriage and conversion of local Bantu inhabitants and later Arab immigration turned the Kilwa Sultanate into a veritable melting pot, ethnically indifferentiable from the mainland. Recent ancient DNA studies have confirmed that Asian ancestry in the medieval period originally came from Iran, and that Asian and African ancestors began mixing at least 1,000 years ago.

The mixture of Perso-Arab and Bantu cultures is credited for creating a distinctive East African culture and language known today as Swahili (literally, 'coast-dwellers'). Nonetheless, the Muslims of Kilwa (whatever their ethnicity) would often refer to themselves generally as Shirazi or Arabs, and to the unconverted Bantu peoples of the mainland as Zanj or Kuffar ('infidels').

The Kilwa Sultanate was almost wholly dependent on external commerce. Effectively, it was a confederation of urban settlements, with trade being the backbone of its economy. While there was some local agriculture, the sultanate relied heavily on trade to sustain its urban populations. Grains (principally millet and rice), meats (cattle, poultry), and other necessary supplies had to be purchased from the Bantu tribes of the interior. Kilwan traders encouraged the development of market towns in the Bantu-dominated highlands of what are now Kenya, Tanzania, Mozambique, and Zimbabwe, where agricultural commodities such as grain and meat were exchanged for luxury goods and raw materials like gold and ivory.

The Kilwan mode of living was that of middlemen traders, who imported manufactured goods (like cloth and spices) from Arabia, India, and Persia, and exchanged them in the interior for agricultural products and precious raw materials, like gold and ivory. These were then exported to other parts of the Indian Ocean world, including Arabia, Persia, India, and even China. Kilwa’s economy also saw significant involvement in the slave trade, with the majority of slaves coming from the Bantu peoples of the interior, as well as from the highland regions of East Africa and occasionally from other groups from the Horn of Africa. Slaves were often captured in raids or conflicts and sold to markets in the Arabian Peninsula, Persia, and India.

A notable exception to Kilwa's reliance on external trade was the coconut palm tree. Grown all along the coast, the coconut palm was the mainstay of Kilwan life in every way – not only for its fruit, but also for timber, thatching, and weaving. Kilwan merchant ships – from the large lateen-rigged dhows that plied the open oceans to the small zambucs used for local transit – were usually built from the split trunks of coconut palm wood, their sails made from coconut leaf matting, and the ships held together by coconut coir.

Kilwa Sultanate conducted extensive trade with Arabia, Persia, and across the Indian Ocean to India itself. Coins from the Kilwa Sultanate have been found as far as the Wessel Islands in Australia, which was inhabited by the Yolngu at that time. Kilwan ships made use of the seasonal monsoon winds to sail across to India in the summer and back to Africa in the winter. Kilwan pilots were renowned for their extraordinary sailing accuracy, and Portuguese sailors marveled at their navigational instruments, particularly their latitude staves, which they considered superior to their own.

Nonetheless, the coir-sewn Kilwan ships were not seaworthy enough to brave the treacherous waters and unpredictable violent gusts around Cape Correntes, so the entire region south of that point was rarely sailed by Kilwan merchants. Inhambane was the most southerly settlement that can be considered part of the Kilwan trading empire.

== Decline and fall ==
In its later years, the Sultans of Kilwa began falling into the hands of their ambitious ministers (viziers and emirs), who played the roles of kingmakers, and de facto rulers, and occasionally tried to foist themselves (or one of their family members) on the throne, in competition with the royal dynasty. The most successful was probably Emir Muhammad Kiwabi, who ruled Kilwa for nearly two decades through several sultans, including himself at one point.

Throughout his long 'reign', Emir Muhammad fought an on-again and off-again battle with his nephew, Hassan ibn Suleiman (son of an earlier vizier). Muhammad had, in fact, tried to install Hassan as sultan a couple of times, but it met tremendous resistance from the population of Kilwa. Eventually, Emir Muhammad decided that, in the interests of constitutional propriety and civic peace, Kilwa sultans should always come from the royal dynasty, not families of viziers. Muhammad held that line more or less down to the end, thwarting Hassan's ambitions. The last sultan installed by Emir Muhammad before his death was the royal prince al-Fudail ibn Suleiman in 1495. The man who succeeded to Muhammad's post, Emir Ibrahim (known as Mir Habrahemo in Barros, Abraemo in Goes), helped al-Fudail crush the ambitious Hassan once and for all in a great battle outside Kilwa. But it was not long after this battle that Emir Ibrahim is said to have betrayed and murdered sultan al-Fudail. Rather than declare himself sultan, Ibrahim took power merely with the title of emir, and claimed to be exercising rule in the name of a son of an earlier sultan Suleiman (ibn Muhammad?) of the old royal dynasty. That no one had seen or heard of this absent prince for years was quite convenient for Emir Ibrahim. Emir Ibrahim's usurpation was met with shock not only in Kilwa, but in the vassal cities as well. Emir Muhammad had (belatedly) recognized the importance of constitutional propriety for peace in the Kilwa Sultanate. Emir Ibrahim's murderous coup had run roughshod over it. Most of the local governors of the Kilwa vassal cities, many who were either relatives or had owed their positions to Emir Muhammad and the royal dynasty, refused to acknowledge the usurpation of Emir Ibrahim, and began charting an independent course for their own city-states. The writ of Emir Ibrahim probably only covered the city of Kilwa itself and possibly Mozambique Island.

This was more or less the condition of the Kilwa Sultanate when the Portuguese arrived.

== Portuguese era ==
Portuguese scout Pêro da Covilhã, disguised as an Arab merchant, had travelled the length of the Kilwa Sultanate in 1489–1490, and visited the ports of Malindi, Kilwa and Sofala, and delivered his scouting report back to Lisbon, describing the condition of the Kilwa Sultanate in quite some detail. The first Portuguese ships, under Vasco da Gama, on their way to India, reached the sultanate in 1497. Da Gama made contact with the Kilwa vassals of Mozambique, Mombassa, and Malindi, seeking to secure their cooperation as staging posts for the Portuguese India Armadas.

In 1500, the 2nd Portuguese India Armada, under Pedro Álvares Cabral, visited Kilwa itself, and attempted to negotiate a commercial and alliance treaty with Emir Ibrahim. But emir prevaricated and no agreement was reached.

The well-armed Fourth Armada of 1502, under Vasco da Gama again, came in a more mean-spirited mood, indisposed to take no for an answer. Having secured separate treaties with Malindi, Mozambique and all-important Sofala, the Portuguese brought their menacing fleet to bear on Kilwa itself, and extorted a sizeable tribute from Emir Ibrahim.

Some have speculated whether Emir Ibrahim missed a golden opportunity to restore his fortunes, that had a treaty with Cabral been reached back in 1500, he might have secured the assistance of the Portuguese navy in bringing the half-independent vassals back under his sway. At least one Kilwan nobleman, a certain Muhammad ibn Rukn ad Din (known to the Portuguese as Muhammad Arcone), certainly advised Emir Ibrahim to strike up an alliance with the Portuguese (and for his pains, was given up as a hostage to the Portuguese by the Emir, who then refused ransom him back – allowing him to be subjected to da Gama's wrath).

As it turns out, the vassals used the Portuguese, one by one, to secure their permanent break from the Sultanate. The ruler of Malindi was the first to embrace the Portuguese, forging an alliance in 1497 (largely to be directed against Mombassa). After Emir Ibrahim's coup, it was certainly not hard to persuade the ruling sheikh Isuf of Sofala (Yçuf in Barros, Çufe in Goes; he was apparently a nephew of the late Emir Muhammad) to break away. He signed a treaty with the Portuguese in 1502, and followed it up by allowing the construction of a Portuguese factory and fort in Sofala in 1505.

It was in 1505 that Francisco de Almeida brought his fleet into the harbor of Kilwa, and landed some 500 Portuguese soldiers to drive Emir Ibrahim out of the city. Almeida installed the aforementioned Muhammad Arcone on the throne, as a Portuguese vassal. Remembering constitutional proprieties, Arcone insisted that Micante, the son of the late sultan al-Fudail be his designated successor. The Portuguese erected a fortress (Fort Santiago) on Kilwa and left a garrison behind, under the command of Pedro Ferreira Fogaça, to keep an eye on things.

Portuguese rule was not very welcome. Particularly grating was the imposition of Portuguese mercantilist laws on the sultanate, forbidding all but Portuguese ships to carry trade to the principal coastal towns – essentially putting many leading Kilwan merchants out of business.

The Portuguese did not stay very long. In May, 1506, Muhammad Arcone was lured and assassinated by the sheikh of Tirendicunde (a relative of Emir Ibrahim). As per the pre-arranged succession rule, Micante ascended to the throne. However, Fogaça, seeing that Micante's ascension was supported by the old faction of Emir Ibrahim, concluded he would not do as a Portuguese puppet. Consequently, he deposed Micante and installed Hussein ibn Muhammad, a son of Arcone, as the new sultan.

Chaos broke out in the city of Kilwa. Partisans of Micante (and Emir Ibrahim) seized control of much of the city, driving sultan Hussein (and the partisans of Arcone) to seek refuge by the Portuguese Fort Santiago. Street fighting and soon fires broke out. In the chaos, streams of Kilwan residents fled the city, leaving it practically deserted, save for a handful of roving partisan gangs and the terrified Portuguese garrison.

Hearing of the Kilwan chaos all the way in India, the Portuguese viceroy Almeida dispatched a magistrate Nuno Vaz Pereira to inquire into the matter. Arriving in late 1506, Pereira convened the competing sultans Micante and Hussein, and asked them present their cases. Pereira ruled in favor of Hussein, confirming him as sultan, but softened the blow by relieving the unpopular commander Fogaça and lifting the mercantilist restrictions on Kilwa shipping.

The Kilwan refugees returned and a modicum of peace resumed, but only briefly. For Hussein put it in his head to lead the Kilwan army against Tirendicunde, to avenge his father's murder. The town was brutally sacked, and numerous prisoners taken. Hussein then dispatched emissaries to all the vassal cities of the Kilwa Sultanate, ordering them to return to obedience, or else meet the same fate.

Fearing that Hussein's spate of tyranny might jeopardize Portuguese interests in East Africa, Viceroy Almeida reversed Pereira's decision, deposed Hussein and reinstated Micante.

== Rulers ==
The chronology of rulers of the Kilwa Sultanate is reported in a chronicle translated into Portuguese in the 16th century, and recorded by the chronicler João de Barros. There is another surviving chronicle (Zanzibar chronicle) by an unknown author, written in the early 16th century, and compiled in 1862 by (or for) sheikh Moheddin (Majid?) of Zanzibar. (Note: The Zanzibar chronicle is translated in Strong (1895).) The Barros and Zanzibar chronicle are not always in concordance with each other. The following follows Barros in its outlines, but fills in details from the Zanzibar chronicle. Alternative spellings and nicknames, mainly given in Barros's chronicle, are in italics. Dates are approximate years of ascension.

=== Shirazi era ===
1. (957 CE) Ali ibn al-Hassan Shirazi (Ighawumij) – founder of Kilwa
2. (?) Muhammad ibn Ali (Ali Bumale, son of previous) – ruled forty years. Had no children.
3. (996) Ali ibn Bashat (Ali Busoloquete, nephew or cousin of previous) – elected by Kilwa colonists. He was the son of Bashat ibn al-Hassan, the brother of sultan Ali ibn al-Hassan; Bashat had been appointed by his brother as the first ruler of Mafia Island. Bashat's son Ali ruled Kilwa for four and a half years.
4. (c. 1001) Dawud ibn Ali (son of previous) – deposed after four years by Matata Mandalima, king of the Changa/Xanga. Dawud fled to Mafia island, where he died.
5. (c. 1005) Khalid ibn Bakr (Hale Bonebaquer; said to be nephew of Matata Mandalima), installed as ruler of Kilwa by the Changa. Ruled only two years, deposed in uprising by Persian colonists.
6. (1005/07) al-Hassan ibn Suleiman ibn Ali (Hocen Soleiman, nephew of the late Dawud) – installed by Persian colonists after uprising against Changa puppet, ruled 16 years.
7. (1023?) Ali ibn Dawud I (son of Dawud, nephew of al-Hassan), ruled 60 years.
8. (1083?) Ali ibn Dawud II (grandson of Ali ibn Dawud) – ruled 6 years, a deranged tyrant, deposed by the people of Kilwa, and condemned to die in a well.
9. (1106) al-Hassan ibn Dawud (Hacen ben Daut, brother of Ali ibn Dawud II) – elevated by the people of Kilwa to replace his despised brother. Ruled 24 years.
10. (1129) Suleiman (patronym unclear, "of royal lineage") – deposed and beheaded by the people of Kilwa after only two years.
11. (1131) Dawud ibn Suleiman (son of previous) made his original career and fortune in Sofala, before being recalled to Kilwa to replace his father. Ruled 40 years.
12. (1170) Suleiman ibn al-Hassan ibn Dawud (Soleiman Hacen, son of ninth sultan given above), one of the greatest of Kilwa sultans, credited for conquering much of the Swahili Coast, bringing Sofala, Pemba, Zanzibar, and portions of the mainland under Kilwa's rule; responsible for erecting many buildings in Kilwa itself, including its stone fortress and palaces, transforming the city into a veritable metropolis. Ruled 18 years.
13. (1189) Dawud ibn Suleiman (son of previous), ruled 2 years.
14. (1190) Talut ibn Suleiman (brother of previous) ruled 1 year
15. (1191) Hussein ibn Suleiman (brother of previous) – ruled 25 years. Died without heirs.
16. (1215) Khalid ibn Suleiman (Hale Bonij brother of previous) – ruled 10 years
17. (1225) ? ibn Suleiman (Bone Soleiman, nephew of previous, son of ?) – ruled 40 years
18. (1263–1267) Ali ibn Dawud (uncertain connection) – ruled 14 years.

End of Persian Shirazi dynasty c. 1277, beginning of Mahdali dynasty of Yemeni Arab sayyids, or what the Zanzibar chronicle calls the "family of Abu al-Mawahib".

=== Mahdali era ===
19. (1277) al-Hassan ibn Talut (grandson of Ali ibn Dawud) – seized power by force, ruled 18 years; had a reputation as "an excellent knight".
20. (1294) Suleiman ibn Hassan (son of previous) – ruled 14 years; murdered by conspirators upon leaving a mosque. Partisans proclaimed his son Hassan ibn Suleiman ruler, but as he was on pilgrimage in Mecca at the time, the throne was temporarily passed to Hassan's brother Dawud.
21. (1308) Daud ibn Suleiman (son of previous) – ruled 2 years in name of his brother Hassan. Stepped down voluntarily on Hassan's return from Mecca.
22. (1310) Abu al-Mawahib al-Hasan ibn Sulaiman (brother of previous) – acclaimed earlier while absent in Mecca; ruled 24 years. Died without heirs.
23. (1333) Dawud ibn Suleiman (same as 21st, brother of previous) – second time on the throne, this time in his own right. Ruled 24 years.
24. (1356) Suleiman ibn Dawud (son of previous) – first time, ruled only 20 days. Deposed by his uncle, Hussein al-Ma'tun.
25. (1356) Hussein ibn Suleiman al-Mat'un (uncle of previous) ruled 6 years. Died in battle against the "Almuli", a Bantu people on the mainland, without heirs.
26. (1362) Talut ibn Dawud (nephew of previous, brother of earlier Suleiman) - ruled only one year. Deposed by his brother, the ex-king Suleiman.
27. (1364) Suleiman ibn Dawud (brother of previous, 2nd reign) – 2 years and 4 months. Deposed by his uncle Suleiman
28. (1366) Suleiman ibn Suleiman ibn Hussein (uncle of previous) – ruled 24 years
29. (1389) Hussein ibn Suleiman (son of previous) – ruled 24 years
30. (1412) Muhammad ibn Suleiman al-Adil (al-Malik al-Adil, Mahamed Ladil, brother of previous) – ruled 9 years
31. (1421) Suleiman ibn Muhammad (son of previous) – ruled 22 years. Died without heirs. Said to have rebuilt the mosque of Kilwa.
32. (1442) Ismail ibn Hussein (uncle of previous) – ruled 14 years. Challenged by pretender Sa'id ibn Hassan, who secured the support of Hassan ibn Abu Bakr, ruler of Zanzibar. The Zanzibaris assembled a coalition to seize Kilwa by force. However, Ismail's ministers, vizier Suleiman and Emir Muhammad managed to bribe the key organizer of the expedition, who withdrew the Zanzibari troops and left pretender Sa'id stranded on the beach of Kilwa with only a small body of attendants. Although pardoned by Ismail, Sa'id went into hiding.
33. (1454) vizier Suleiman (vizier of previous) At death of sultan Ismail, in the first known usurpation by ministers, the vizier Suleiman and Emir Muhammad al-Mazlum launched a coup and seized power together, with Suleiman declaring himself Sultan. However, popular opinion was strongly against the vizier, so he decided to pass the throne over to the more popular Emir Muhammad.
34. (1454) Muhammad ibn al-Hussein ibn Muhammad ibn Suleiman al-Mazlum ('Emir Muhammad', noble co-conspirator with previous) According to Zanzibar chronicle, after the death of vizier Suleiman, Muhammad appointed the old pretender Sa'id ibn Hassan to the post as his own vizier. Muhammad died shortly after. Reigned for less than a year (deposed, according to Barros).
35. (1455) Ahmad ibn Suleiman (son of the late vizier?), deposed within a year by partisans of the old royal family. (Barros omits Ahmad, says the partisans deposed Muhammad directly.)
36. (1456) al-Hassan ibn Ismail (son of 32nd sultan Ismail), installed by coup. Ruled ten years.
37. (1466) Sa'id ibn al-Hassan/Hussein (son of previous, according to Barros; same old pretender (cf. 32nd) according to Zanzibar chronicle) – ruled 10 years. Upon his death, the Kilwa Sultanate fell into disarray. There was another ministerial coup d'état.
38. (1476) Suleiman ibn Muhammad ibn al-Husayn ('Vizier Suleiman') vizier seized throne after death of Sa'id, declared himself sultan and elevated his own brother, Muhammad Kiwabi, to the dignity of emir. However, vizier-turned-sultan Suleiman's rule lasted little over a year.
39. (1477) Abdullah ibn al-Hassan (brother of 37th sultan Sa'id) elevated by people of Kilwa against usurping vizier Suleiman. Ruled one and half years.
40. (1478) Ali ibn Hassan (brother of previous). Ruled 1.5 years. Upon his death, Emir Muhammad Kiwabi (brother of the late vizier Suleiman) seized power, and installed his nephew al-Hassan as sultan.
41. (1479) al-Hassan ibn Suleiman (son of vizier Suleiman), first time, installed by his uncle, Emir Muhammad. However, al-Hassan proved an unpopular sultan and was deposed by his own uncle after 6 years.
42. (1485) Sabhat ibn Muhammad ibn Suleiman ('Xumbo', a scion of royal lineage, son of 31st sultan, al-Adil) installed by Emir Muhammad, after popular opposition to his first choice al-Hassan. Ruled one year, then died. According to the Zanzibar Chronicle, Emir Muhammad tried to install his nephew al-Hassan again.
43. (1486) al-Hassan ibn Suleiman (second time) installed by uncle Emir Muhammad once again, but popular opposition proved too strong. Emir Muhammad decided to depose al-Hassan once again and look for a suitable sultan from the royal dynasty.
44. (1490) Ibrahim ibn Muhammad (brother of Sabhat, another son of al-Adil) installed by Emir Muhammad to replace his nephew al-Hassan. However, the deposed al-Hassan ibn Suleiman launched a coup attempt to depose Ibrahim, that resulted in quite some bloodshed. In the end, al-Hassan's ambitions were foiled by his uncle Emir Muhammad, who, seeking to restore order, declared unambiguously that Ibrahim, a descendant of kings, had precedence over al-Hassan, who was only of a family of viziers. Al-Hassan driven into exile on the mainland. Ibrahim ruled for two years, until Emir Muhammad decided to depose him himself.
45. (1495) Muhammad ibn Kiwab ('Emir Muhammad Kiwabi', the powerful emir) declared himself sultan, only very briefly, probably just to show he can or to satisfy his curiosity or perhaps just to forestall a renewed bid by his exiled nephew al-Hassan while he sorted through other candidates. In any case, Muhammad abdicated soon after, and installed another royal family member, al-Fudail.
46. (1495) al-Fudail ibn Suleiman ('Alfudail', nephew of Ibrahim, thus of royal blood) installed by Emir Muhammad, after his own abdication. This is 1495 AD (901 AH). Immediately after ascension, exiled ex-ruler Hassan ibn Suleiman returned with a mixed army of Bantus and Kilwan exiles to reclaim the throne. The sheikh of Zanzibar offered to mediate, and, through his good offices, al-Fudail even contemplated ceding the throne to Hassan and ending the quarrel. But Emir Muhammad refused to allow it. Instead, he promised al-Hassan an amnesty, but only if he returned to private life in Kilwa. While awaiting Hassan's reply to this offer, the great Emir Muhammad Kiwabi died rather suddenly. In the confusion, pretender Hassan infiltrated troops into Kilwa city, under the command of his own son Sa'id. Caught by city authorities, Sa'id invented a story about just 'preparing the house' for his father's peaceful return to Kilwa as a private citizen. To allay suspicions, Sa'id finally proposed to lead a Kilwan embassy, escorted by a squad of city troops, to his father's encampment to confirm his story. Thinking the crisis had been defused, at least until the embassy returned from its investigation, Kilwa let its guard down. However, the embassy did not return. Rather, Sa'id led it to at trap, and it was massacred. The army of al-Hassan attacked that very same night. The surprised city rallied frantically to its defenses, and a great and bloody battle ensued outside the gates of the city. The Kilwans defeated al-Hassan and put an end to the perennial pretender. The victorious Sultan al-Fudail appointed a certain Ibrahim ibn Suleiman as emir, to replace the late Emir Muhammad. But this state of affairs only lasted a few years.

End of Mahdali dynasty c. 1495, beginning of a series of usurpers and Portuguese puppets.

=== Portuguese era ===
47. (1499) Ibrahim ibn Suleiman ('Emir Ibrahim', 'Mir Habraemo' in Portuguese) minister of Sultan al-Fudail; deposed and murdered the sultan and took power himself not as sultan, but in the name of an absent son of an earlier sultan Suleiman. Incensed, the regional vassals of the Kilwan Sultanate refuse to recognize the usurpation. Emir Ibrahim will be driven out and deposed by the Portuguese captain Francisco de Almeida in 1505.
48. (1505) Muhammad ibn Rukn ad Din (Muhammad 'Arcone' to the Portuguese, Kilwan noble, not of royal lineage) installed by Francisco de Almeida as Portuguese vassal sultan of Kilwa. But remembering the importance of constitutional propriety, Muhammad immediately appointed royal prince Muntari, the son of late al-Fudail, as his successor. He was assassinated after a year.
49. (1506) Micante (son of al-Fudail) his predecessor 'Arcone' accepted the throne until Micante, could take the throne.

== Possible link to Australia ==
In 1944, nine coins were found on Marchinbar Island, the largest island in the Wessel Islands of the Northern Territory of Australia. While four coins were identified as Dutch duits dating from 1690 to the 1780s, five with Arabic inscriptions were identified as being from the Kilwa Sultanate. The coins are now held by the Powerhouse Museum, Sydney, Australia. In 2018, another coin, also thought to be from Kilwa, was found on a beach on Elcho Island, another of the Wessel Islands.

== See also ==
- Kilwa Kisiwani
- Great Mosque of Kilwa
- Swahili people
- Swahili culture
- Sultan al-Hasan ibn Sulaiman
- Shirazi (ethnic group)
- Sultanate of Zanzibar
