= Zanj =

Name used by medieval Muslim geographers to refer to a portion of Southeast Africa

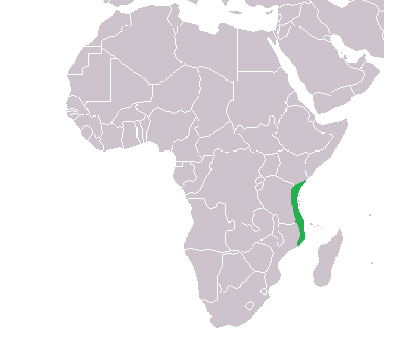
The Swahili coast

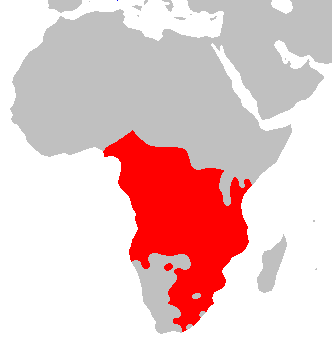
The Bantu inhabited areas

Zanj (Arabic: زَنْج; IPA: [zand͡ʒ], adj. زنجي; [zan.d͡ʒijj], Zanjī; from Persian: زنگ, romanized: Zang; [zæɲɡʲ̥]) is a term used by medieval Muslim geographers to refer to both a certain portion of Southeast Africa (primarily the Swahili Coast) and its Bantu inhabitants. It has also been used to collectively refer to sub-Saharan peoples by Arab sources. This word is also the origin of the place-names Zanzibar ("coast of the Zanji") and the Sea of Zanj.

The latinization Zingium serves as an archaic name for the coastal area in modern Kenya and Tanzania in southern East Africa. The architecture of these commercial urban settlements is now a subject of study for urban planning. For centuries the coastal settlements were a source of ivory, gold, and slaves, taken from sections of the conquered hinterland, to the Indian Ocean world.

== Etymology ==
From Middle Persian *zang, paraphrased based on attested Middle Persian (zangig /zangigh/, "black one"). Furthermore, it is possibly related to the ancient Greek Ἀζανία (Azania), the name of a region in East Africa in the first century AD, and to the ancient Greek Ζήγγισα (Zengissa), the Greek name for a headland in what is now southern Somalia. Anthony Christie argued that the word zanj or zang may not be Arabic in origin: a Chinese form (僧祇 sēngqí) is recorded as early as 607 AD. Christie argued that the word is South East Asian in origin. The Javanese word jenggi means African people, specifically the people of Zanzibar.

== Division of East Africa's coast ==
Geographers historically divided the eastern coast of Africa at large into several regions based on each region's respective inhabitants. Arab and Chinese sources referred to the general area that was located to the south of the three regions of Misr (Egypt), Al-Habasha (Abyssinia) and Barbara (Somalia), as Zanj.

Zanj was situated in the Southeast Africa vicinity and was inhabited by Bantu-speaking peoples called the Zanj. The core area of Zanj occupation stretched from the territory south of present-day Ras Kamboni to Pemba Island in Tanzania. South of Pemba lay Sofala in modern Mozambique, the northern boundary of which may have been Pangani. Beyond Sofala was the obscure realm of Waq-Waq, also in Mozambique. The 10th-century Arab historian and geographer Abu al-Hasan 'Alī al-Mas'ūdī describes Sofala as the furthest limit of Zanj settlement, and mentions its king's title as Mfalme, a Bantu word.

== Zanj territory ==
=== History ===
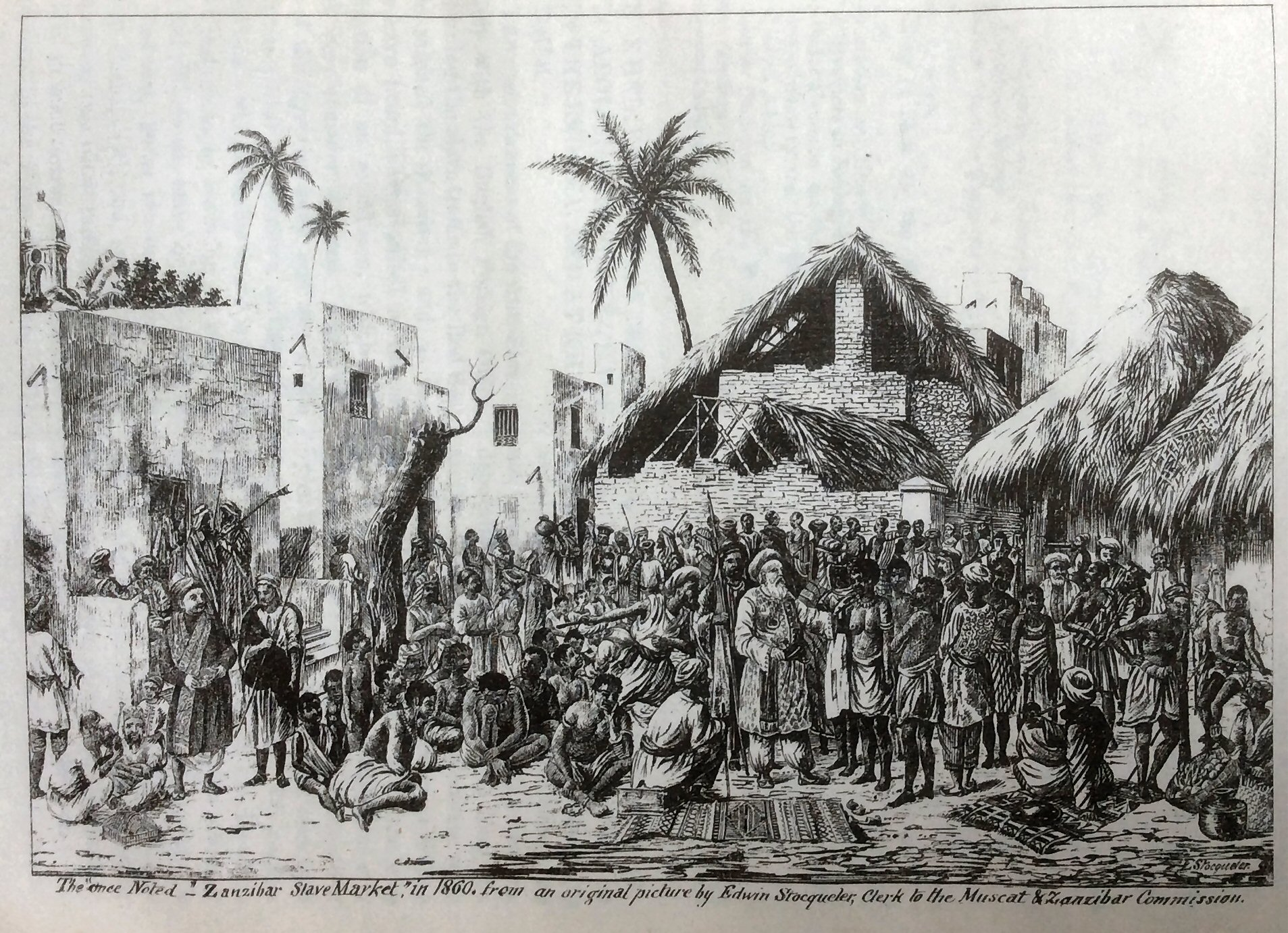
Zanzibar slave market in 1860, by Edwin Stocqueler

The Zanj traded with Persians, Arabs, and Indians, but according to some sources, only locally, since they possessed no ocean-going ships.

The settlements in Zanzibar identified them as economically part of the cosmopolitan culture of the Indian Ocean Basin with trade links as far as Arabia, Persia, and as far east as India and China.

The main source of Zanj slaves was likely the frontier between Eastern Cushitic language speakers and Bantu language speakers, where warlike Somali pastoralists were expanding southwards and subjecting the scattered colonies of Bantu agriculturalists.

Since Arab and Persian identity is patrilineal, elite Swahili claimed, often correctly, prestigious Persian genealogy. Modern conceptions of cultural fusion or Persian origins developed from the tendency of wealthy Swahili to claim Persian patrilineal origins (which has been supported by DNA studies) and the disproportionate 19th-century importation of Omani elements to Zanzibari and Swahili society. Standard Swahili is the Zanzibari dialect and thus includes far more Arabic loanwords than the other, older Swahili dialects.

Prominent settlements of the Zanj coast included Kilwa, Kunduchi, Mbuamaji, Tongoni, Kimbiji, Kaole, Malindi, Gedi, and Mombasa. By the late medieval period, the area included at least 37 substantial Swahili trading towns, many of them quite wealthy.

The urban ruling and commercial classes of these Swahili settlements included male Arab, Persian, and Indian immigrants. However, Islamic culture prized familial origins from Persia or Arabia; consequently claims of Middle Eastern descent may be untrustworthy for modern genealogical research.

The richest and most powerful slave trader in all of recorded history is Tippu Tip, a man born in Zanzibar with mixed Bantu and Omani ancestry.

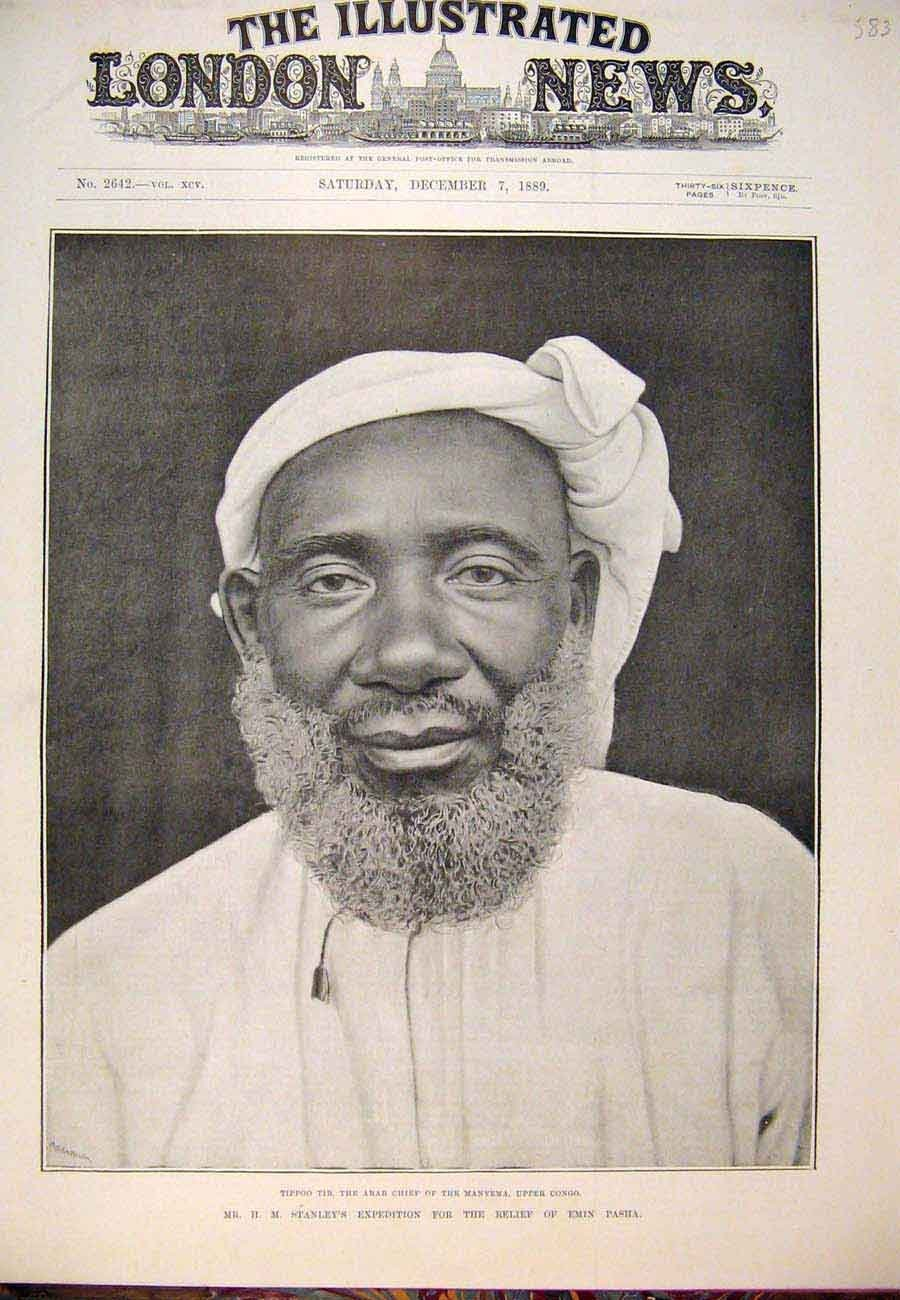
Tippu Tip 1889

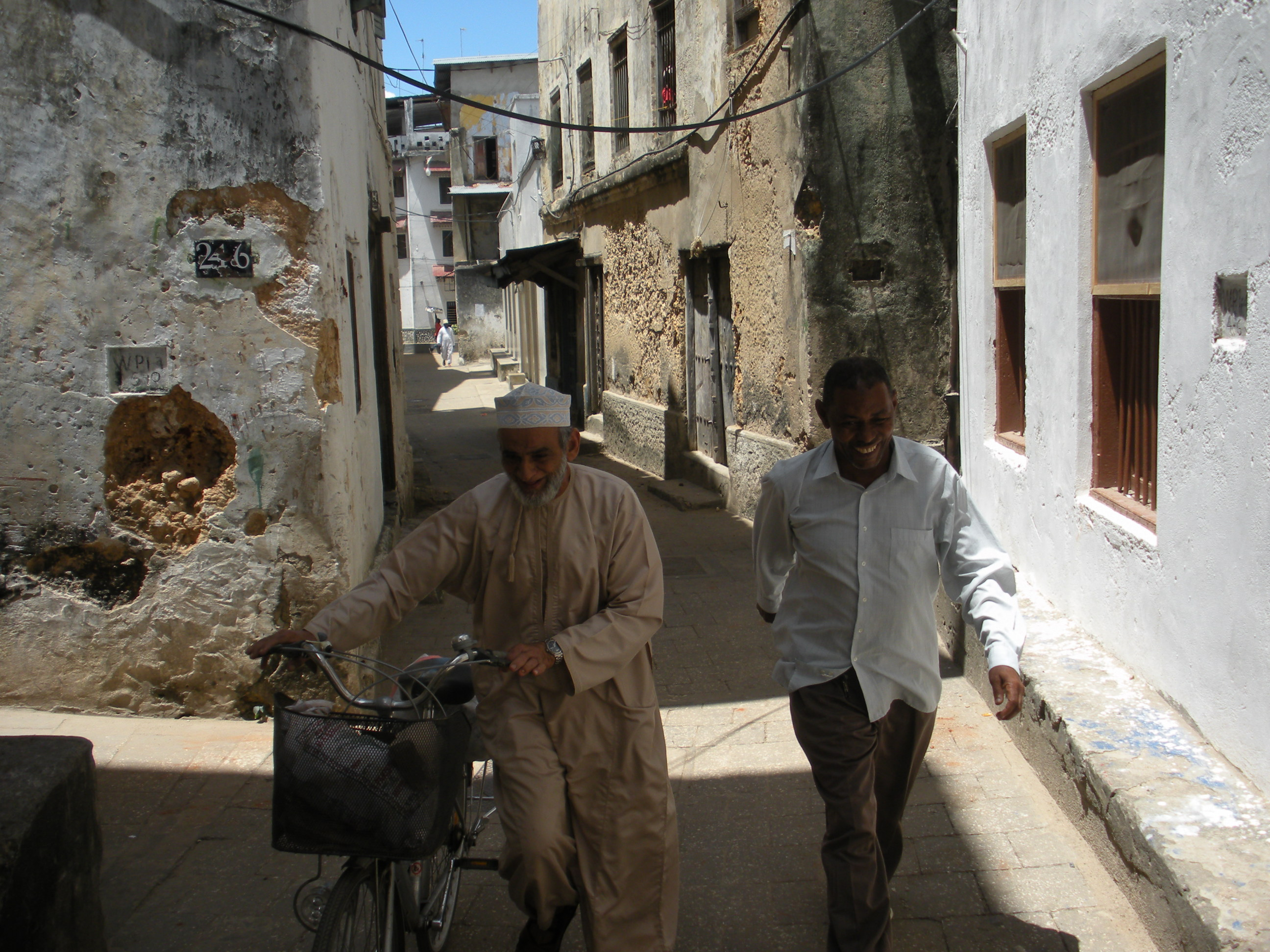
Stone Town in Zanzibar

The Zanj were for centuries shipped as slaves by slave and ivory traders to all the countries bordering the Indian Ocean in the Indian Ocean slave trade. The Umayyad and Abbasid caliphs recruited many Zanj slaves as soldiers and, as early as 696 AD, we learn of slave revolts of the Zanj in Iraq (see below). Ancient Chinese texts also mention ambassadors from Java presenting the Chinese emperor with two Seng Chi (Zanji) slaves as gifts, and Seng Chi slaves reaching China from the Hindu kingdom of Sri Vijaya in Java.

The sea off the south-eastern coast of Africa was known as the Sea of Zanj, and included the Mascarene islands and Madagascar. During the anti-apartheid struggle it was proposed that South Africa should assume the name Azania, to reflect ancient Zanj.

As of 2023, the Lemba people still refer to the populations of neighboring tribes as "Zenj."

=== Ancient DNA analysis ===
A study by Brielle et al in 2023 completed ancient DNA analysis of several samples from the ruins of Zanzibar. Ancient DNA (aDNA) analysis was completed for 80 individuals from 6 medieval and early modern (AD 1250–1800) coastal towns and an inland town after AD 1650 in order to determine the proportions of "African-like, Persian-like, and Indian-like" DNA sequences. More than half of the DNA of many of the individuals from coastal towns originated from primarily female ancestors from Africa, with a large proportion — sometimes more than half—of the DNA coming from Asian ancestors. The Asian ancestry includes components associated with Persia and India, with 80–90% of the Asian DNA originating from Persian men. Peoples of African and Asian (predominantly Persian) origins began to mix by about AD 1000. Samples were taken from two boxes of human remains located the in British Institute in Eastern Africa (BIEA) in Nairobi, originally excavated in the 1950s and 1960s by Chittick.

After AD 1500, the sources of male Asian DNA became increasingly Arabian, consistent with increased interactions with southern Arabia. From medieval times until the modern day, subsequent interactions with different Asian and African people have changed the ancestry of the present-day people living on the Swahili coast compared to the medieval individuals whose DNA was sequenced.

Potentially dating from 1300-1600 AD (more precise radiocarbon dating techniques were unable to be completed in time for these samples), analysis was completed of the individuals' mitochondrial DNA (mtDNA), autosomal DNA, Y chromosome DNA, and X chromosome DNA. Analysis of mtDNA in the individual, demonstrating maternal ancestry patterns, showed a L* haplotype. The L* haplotype is predominantly found in present-day Sub-Saharan African populations. Y chromosome analysis, demonstrating paternal ancestry patterns, showed that the individual was carrying the J2 haplotype, a DNA pattern found in Southwest Asian or Persian individuals. X chromosomes, containing larger maternal influence, were compared with the 22 autosomal chromosomes, which contain equal maternal and paternal influence. X chromosomes contained more indicators of African ancestry compared to the autosomal DNA, further adding to evidence of African ancestry on the maternal side and Persian or Southeast Asian ancestry on the paternal side.

=== Contemporary descriptions ===
We know from Kwale-ware sites that starting in the Iron Age Bantu-speaking people were spreading into the area south of Ethiopia and Somalia and these people were referred to as Zanj and were being exported as slaves all along the Indian Ocean. Chinese sources from the 9th century make a clear distinction between "Somali (Barbar) pastoralists of Po-Pa-Li" and "savage blacks of Ma-Lin," which is probably to be identified with Malindi in Kenya. A description of the Zanj is found in the following passage from Kitab al-Bad' wah-tarikh, by the medieval Arab writer al-Muqaddasī:

As for the Zanj, they are people of black color, flat noses, kinky hair, and little understanding or intelligence.

In 1331, the Arabic-speaking Berber scholar and explorer Ibn Battuta visited the Kilwa Sultanate in the Zanj. Ibn Battuta recorded his visit to the city around 1331, and commented favorably on the generosity, humility, and religion of its ruler, Sultan al-Hasan ibn Sulaiman. Ibn Battuta also describes how the sultan would go into the interior and raid the people taking slaves and other forms of wealth. He was also particularly impressed by the planning of the city and believed that it was the reason for Kilwa's success along the coast. From this period, the construction of the Palace of Husuni Kubwa and a significant extension to the Great Mosque of Kilwa, which was made of coral stones, the largest mosque of its kind. Kilwa was an important and wealthy city for the trade of gold and ivory. Because of trade, some of the people who lived in Kilwa had a higher standard of living, but many others were poor. The wealthy enjoyed indoor plumbing in their stone homes and the poor lived in mud huts with thatched roofs. Ibn Battuta characterized the enslaved Zanj people as "jet-black in color, and with scarification on their faces."

Kilwa is one of the most beautiful and well-constructed towns in the world. The whole of it is elegantly built. The roofs are built with mangrove pole. There is very much rain. The people are engaged in a holy war, for their country lies beside the pagan Zanj. Their chief qualities are devotion and piety: they follow the Shafi'i sect. When I arrived, the Sultan was Abu al-Muzaffar Hasan surnamed Abu al-Mawahib [loosely translated, "The Giver of Gifts"] ... on account of his numerous charitable gifts. He frequently makes raids into the Zanj country [neighboring mainland], attacks them and carries off booty, of which he reserves a fifth, using it in the manner prescribed by the Koran [Qur'an].

== Zanj Rebellion ==
The Zanj Rebellion was a series of uprisings that took place between 869 and 883 AD near the city of Basra in present-day Iraq during slavery in the Abbasid Caliphate. Many Zanj were taken as slave soldiers, but many had earned their freedom and chose to stay in Iraq as free persons and make Iraq their home living amongst the Marsh Arabs. The term Zanj here is thought to refer to Africans in general due to the lack of a prolific slave trade on the Swahili coast during this period.

== See also ==
- Saqaliba
