= Swahili people =

East African ethnic group

Swahili Waswahili وَسوَحِيلِ
Waungwana وَؤُنْڠوَانَ
- People of Lamu, Kenya, at the annual donkey race.

Regions with significant populations
- Swahili Coast and archipelagos: c. 1.2 million
- Tanzania: 996,000
- Kenya: 56,074
- Mozambique: 22,000
- Comoros: 4,000
- Diaspora: c. 0.8 million
- Saudi Arabia: 400,000
- Madagascar: 113,000
- Oman: 100,000
- United States: 90,000
- DRC: 20,000-68,000

Languages
- Swahili; Arabic; English; Portuguese; French

Religion
- Islam (Sunni, Shia, Sufism, Ibadi)

Related ethnic groups
- Comorians; Bajunis; Shirazi; Bravanese; Arabs; Lemba; Benadiri; Manyema; Siddis

The Swahili people (Swahili: Waswahili, وَسوَحِيلِ) comprise mainly Bantu, Afro-Arab, and Comorian ethnic groups inhabiting the Swahili coast, an area encompassing the East African coast across southern Somalia, Kenya, Tanzania, and northern Mozambique, as well as various archipelagos off the coast, such as Zanzibar, Lamu, and the Comoro Islands.

== Etymology ==
The name Swahili originated as an exonym for the language derived from Arabic: سواحل, romanized: Sawāhil, lit. 'coasts', with Waungwana as the endonym. Several scholars have additionally asserted that the original name of the Swahili was Wangozi, who spoke Kingozi.

== Definition ==
Historically, the Swahili distinguished themselves from other peoples, including Bantu-speaking neighbors, by self-identifying as Waungwana (the civilised ones). In certain regions, such as Lamu Island, this differentiation is even more stratified in terms of societal grouping and dialect, hinting at the historical processes by which the Swahili have coalesced over time.

More recently, through a process of Swahilization, this identity extends to any person of African descent who speaks Swahili as their first language, is Muslim, and lives in a town of the main urban centres of most of modern-day Tanzania and coastal Kenya, northern Mozambique, or the Comoros. Modern Swahili people speak the Swahili language as a mother tongue, which belongs to the Bantu branch of the Niger-Congo family. The language contains loanwords from Arabic.

== Language ==
The Swahili language is a member of the Bantu subgroup of the Niger-Congo family. Its closest relatives include Comorian, spoken on the Comoros Islands, and the Mijikenda language of the Mijikenda people in Kenya.

With its original speech community centred on Zanzibar and the coastal parts of Kenya and Tanzania, collectively a seaboard referred to as the Swahili Coast, Swahili served as coastal East Africa's lingua franca and trade language from the ninth century onward. Zanzibari traders' intensive push into the African interior from the late eighteenth century induced the adoption of Swahili as a common language throughout much of East Africa. Thus, Swahili is the most spoken African language, used by far more than just the Swahili people themselves.

Swahili became the tongue of the urban class in the African Great Lakes region and eventually went on to serve as a lingua franca during the post-colonial period.

Modern Standard Swahili is derived from the Kiunguja dialect of Zanzibar. Like many other world languages, Swahili has borrowed a large number of words from foreign languages, particularly administrative terms from Arabic but also words from Portuguese, Persian, Hindi, English, and German. Other, older dialects like Kimrima and Kitumbatu have far fewer Arabic loanwords.

== History ==
The Swahili people originate from Bantu inhabitants of the coast of Southeast Africa, in Kenya, Tanzania, and Mozambique. These Bantu-speaking agriculturalists settled the coast at the outset of the first millennium. Archaeological finds at Fukuchani, on the northwest coast of Zanzibar, indicate a settled agricultural and fishing community from the 6th century CE at the latest. The considerable amount of daub found indicates timber buildings, and shell beads, bead grinders, and iron slag have been found at the site. There is evidence of limited engagement in long-distance trade: a small amount of imported pottery has been found—less than 1% of total pottery finds, mostly from the Persian Gulf and dated to the 5th to the 8th centuries. The similarity to contemporary sites such as Mkokotoni and Dar es Salaam indicate a unified group of communities that developed into the first centre of coastal maritime culture. The coastal towns appear to have been engaged in Indian-Ocean trade at this early period, and trade rapidly increased in importance and size between the mid-8th and the 11th century.

A local 15th-century text likely based on oral tradition, the Kilwa Chronicle, identifies the rulers and founders of the costal cities as immigrants from the Iranian city of Shiraz, who arrived during the 11th century. This forms the basis of the Shirazi-era origin myth that proliferated along the coast at the turn of the millennium. Some academics reject the authenticity of the primarily Persian origin claim, pointing to the relative rarity of Persian customs and speech, lack of documentary evidence of Shia Islam in the Muslim literature on the Swahili coast, and instead a historic abundance of Sunni Arab-related evidence. In line with this view, these scholars may assert that documentary evidence, like the archaeological, "for early Persian settlement is likewise completely lacking". Shirazi identity is instead said to have developed as African migrants seem to have developed a concept of Shirazi origin as they moved further south from Lamu, near Malindi and Mombasa, along the Mrima coast, with a localized form of Islam; longstanding trade connections with the Persian gulf gave credence to these myths.

However, this view (or at least a possibility of contact) is not entirely rejected. Some scholars assert that a Persian migration may have occurred, perhaps by way of people who settled first in the Horn of Africa. Recent genetic research from cities across the Swahili coast does confirm that, whatever continuity has been identified in the material culture, substantial intermingling likely occurred among their populations. More people from different parts of the Persian Gulf may have continued to migrate to the Swahili coast over several centuries thereafter, forming the modern Shirazi.

By the twelfth century, as the gold trade with the distant entrepot of Sofala on the Mozambique seaboard grew, the people(s?) of the Swahili cities are said to have moved southwards to various coastal towns in Kenya, Tanzania, northern Mozambique, and the Indian Ocean islands. By 1200 CE, they had established local sultanates and mercantile networks on the islands of Kilwa, Mafia, and Comoros, along the Swahili coast, and in northwestern Madagascar.

Because most Muslim societies are patrilineal, one can claim distant identities through paternal lines. Some still use this foundation myth a millennium later to assert their authority, even though the myth's context has long been forgotten. The Shirazi legend took on new importance in the 19th century, during the period of Omani domination. Claims of Shirazi ancestry were used to distance locals from Arab newcomers, since Persians are not viewed as Arabs but still have Islamic pedigree. The emphasis that the Shirazi came very long ago and intermarried with indigenous locals ties this claim to the creation of convincing indigenous narratives about Swahili heritage without divorcing it from the ideals of being a maritime culture.

== Religion ==
Islam established its presence on the southeast African coast around the 9th century, coincident to Bantu traders both settling on the coast and tapping into the Indian Ocean trade networks. Many Swahili people now follow the Sunni denomination of Islam.

Large numbers of Swahili undertake the Hajj and Umrah from Tanzania, Kenya, and Mozambique. Traditional Islamic dress, such as the jilbab and thob, are also popular among the Swahili. The Swahili also are known for their use of divination, which has adopted some syncretic features from underlying traditional indigenous beliefs. For instance, they believe in djinn, and many men wear protective amulets featuring verses from the Qur'an.

Divination is practiced through Qur'anic readings. Often the diviner incorporates verses from the Qur'an into treatments for certain diseases. On occasion, he or she instructs a patient to soak a piece of paper containing Qur'anic verses in water. With this ink-infused water, literally containing the word of Allah, the patient will then wash his or her body or drink it to cure themselves of affliction. The only people permitted to become medicine givers in the culture are prophets and teachers of Islam.

Some Swahili people practice Christianity.

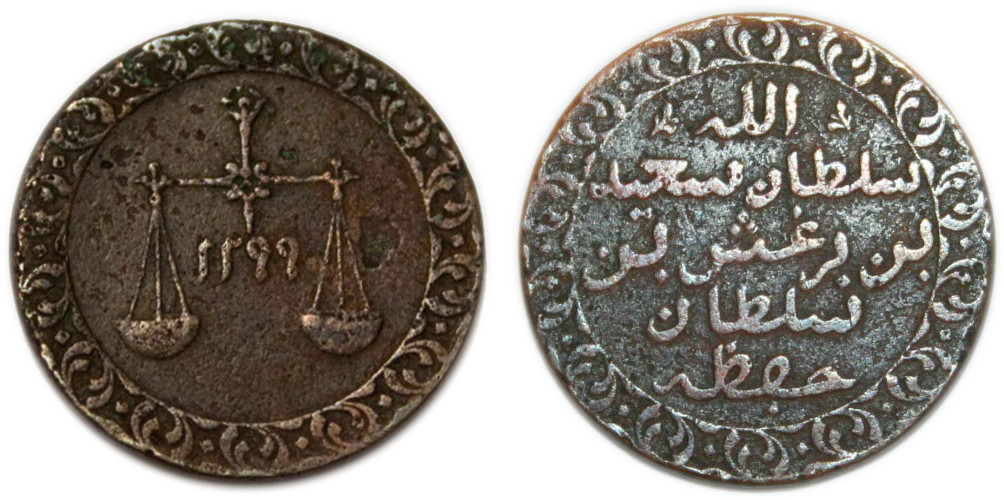
Swahili Arabic script on a one-pysar coin from Zanzibar, c. 1299 AH (1882 CE)

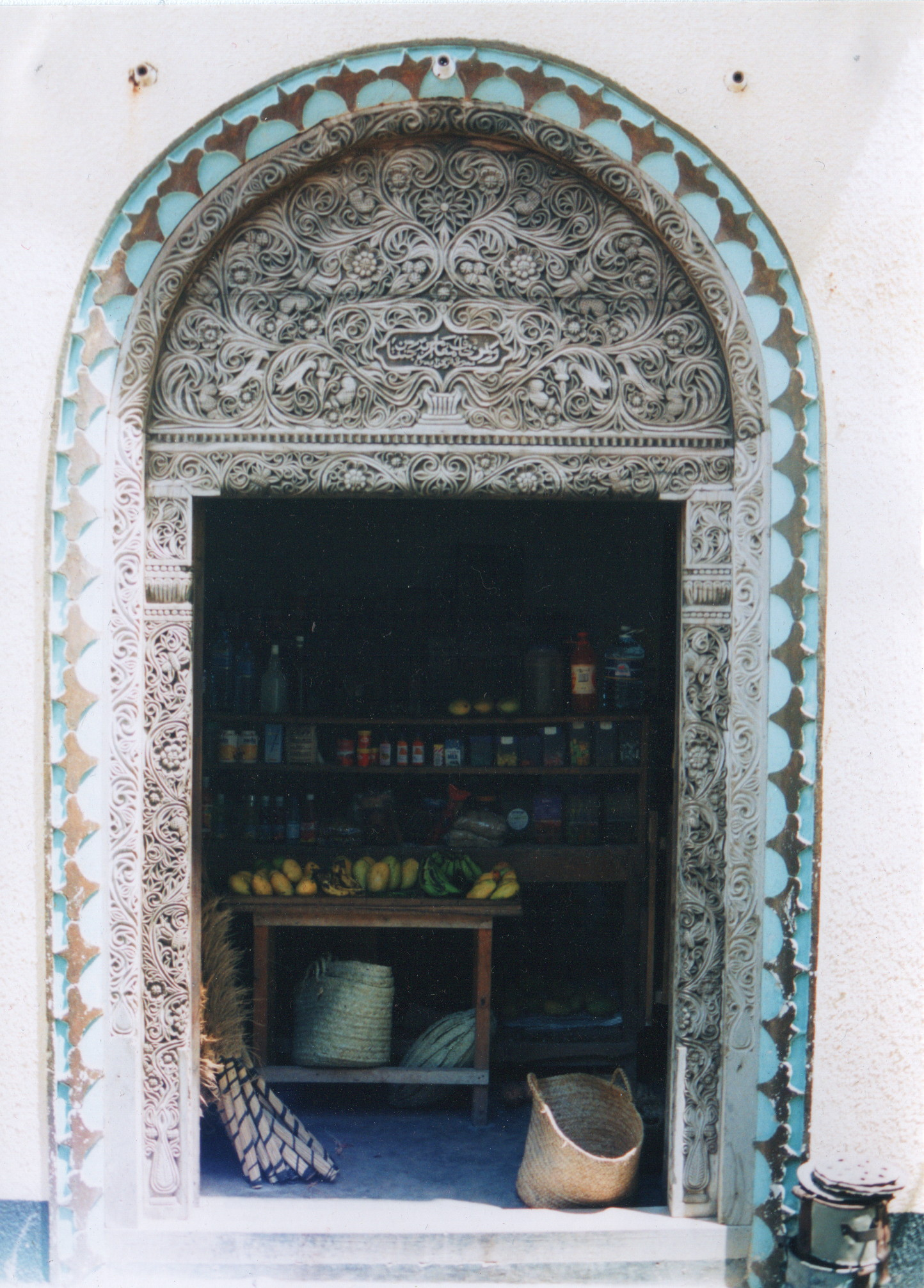
Swahili Arabic script on a carved wooden doorway at Lamu in Kenya

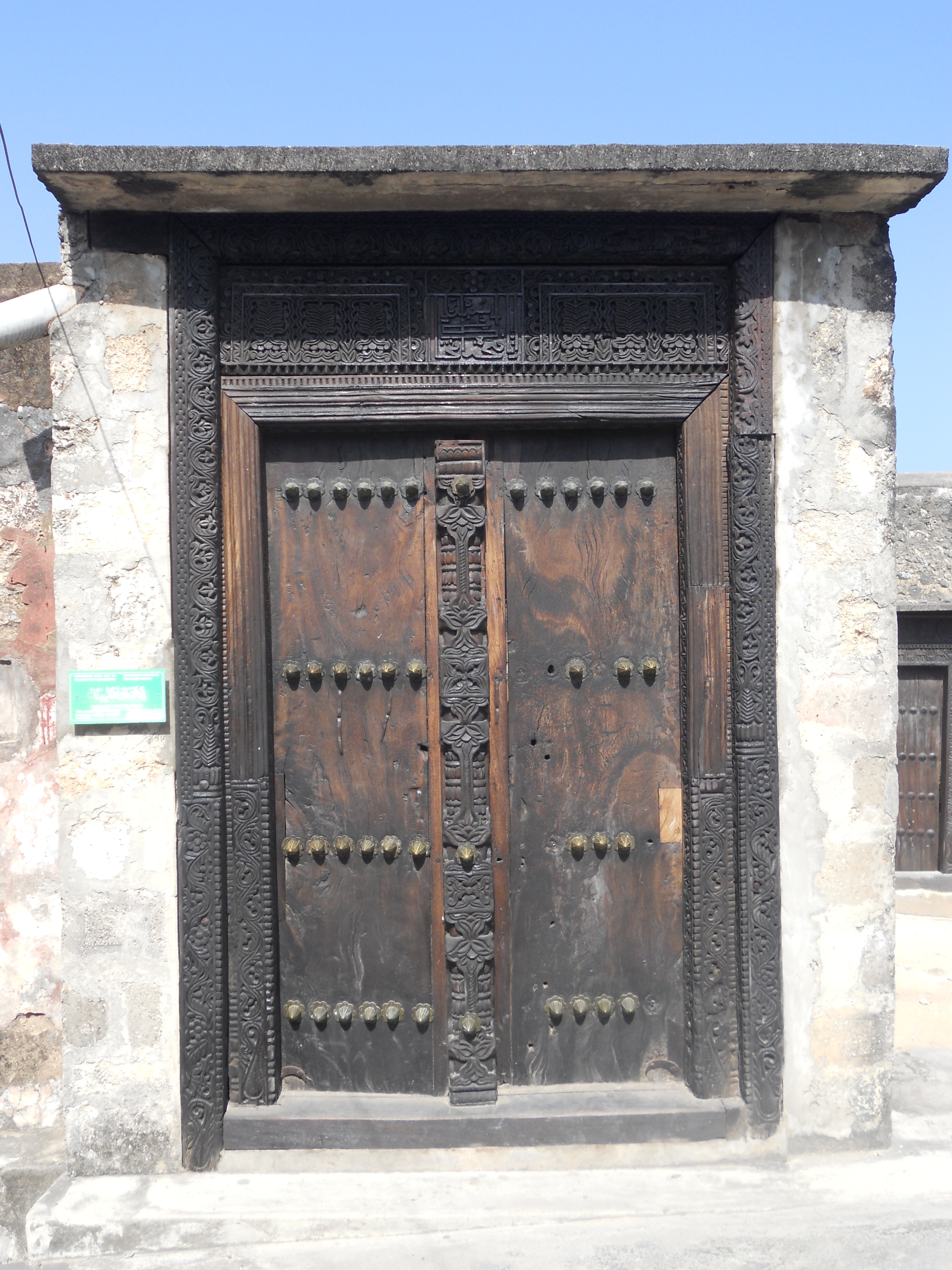
Swahili Arabic script on wooden door in Fort Jesus, Mombasa, Kenya

== Economy ==
For centuries, the Swahili depended greatly on trade from the Indian Ocean, and they played an important role as middlemen between southeast, central, and southern Africa as well as the outside world. Trade contacts have been noted as early as 100 CE by early Roman writers who visited the southeast African coast in the 1st and 2nd centuries CE. Trade routes extended from Kenya to Tanzania into modern-day Congo, along which goods were brought to the coasts and sold to Arab, Indian, and Portuguese traders. Historical and archaeological records attest to Swahilis being prolific maritime merchants and sailors who plied the southeast African coastline to lands as far away as Arabia, Persia, Madagascar, India, and China. Chinese pottery and Arabian beads have been found in the ruins of Great Zimbabwe. During the height of the Middle Ages, ivory and slaves became a substantial source of revenue. Captives sold via the Zanzibar slave trade by Arab slave traders ended up in Portuguese Brazil or via the Indian Ocean slave trade in the Arabian Peninsula.

Although most Swahili living standards are far below those in the wealthiest nations, the Swahili are generally considered a relatively economically powerful group due to their history of trade. For instance, the United Nations has stated that the island of Zanzibar has a 25% higher per-capita GDP than the rest of Tanzania. This economic influence has led to the continued spread of Swahili culture and language throughout East Africa.

== Architecture ==
Upon visiting Kilwa in 1331, the Berber explorer Ibn Battuta was impressed by what he witnessed there. He noted that "Kilwa is a very fine and substantially built town, and all its buildings are of wood" (his description of Mombasa was essentially the same). Local architecture included arches, courtyards, isolated women's quarters, mihrab, towers, and decorative elements on the buildings themselves. Many ruins can still be found near the southern Kenyan port of Malindi, in the ruins of Gedi.

Thought by many early scholars to be essentially of Arab or Persian style and origin, some contemporary academics have suggested that archaeological, written, linguistic, and cultural evidence might suggest an African genesis to Swahili architecture, which would be accompanied only later by enduring Arabic and Islamic influences in the form of trade and an exchange of ideas.

== Genetics ==
In 2022, DNA was extracted, analyzed, and compared in 80 samples taken from people buried between 1250 and 1800 CE in towns that were mostly along the Swahili Coast in modern Kenya and Tanzania. It is believed that these people were Swahili elites, because they were buried in cemeteries near the main mosques. Before 1500 CE, inhabitants of the region carried both African and Asian/Near Eastern ancestry, which was mainly Persian-related (with more than half of their DNA originating from African ancestors and another large portion from Asian ancestors). The male ancestors of elite Swahili people were a mix of approximately 83% Asian and 17% African; about 90% of the Asian DNA was Persian, and the rest was Indian. The female ancestors of Swahili elites were about 97% African and 3% Asian. After this time, Arabian ancestry becomes more prevalent, which correlates with the archaeological and historical record of interactions with Southern Arabia (Oman).

== See also ==
- Wituland
- Zanzibar Sultanate
- Kilwa Sultanate
- Mombasa
- Lamu
- Pate Island
- Stone Town
- Mwana Kupona
- Swahili literature
- List of Swahili settlements of the East African coast
- Swahili coast

== Sources ==
- Horton, Mark; Middleton, John (2000). The Swahili: The social landscape of a mercantile society. Blackwell Publishers. ISBN 978-0-631-18919-0.
