= Ngagu =

Village in Zanzibar, Tanzania

Coordinates: 5°11′S 39°39′E

Ngagu is a village on the Zanzibari island of Pemba. It is located at the end of a narrow peninsula known as Ras Mkumbuu, which lies on the west coast immediately to the north of Chake-Chake Bay. The town is located close to the Quanbalu Ruins. Possibly dating from as early as the eighth century, these are the remains of a major trading centre which may have been Africa's oldest Muslim town.
