= Archaeology of Pemba Island =

Pemba Island

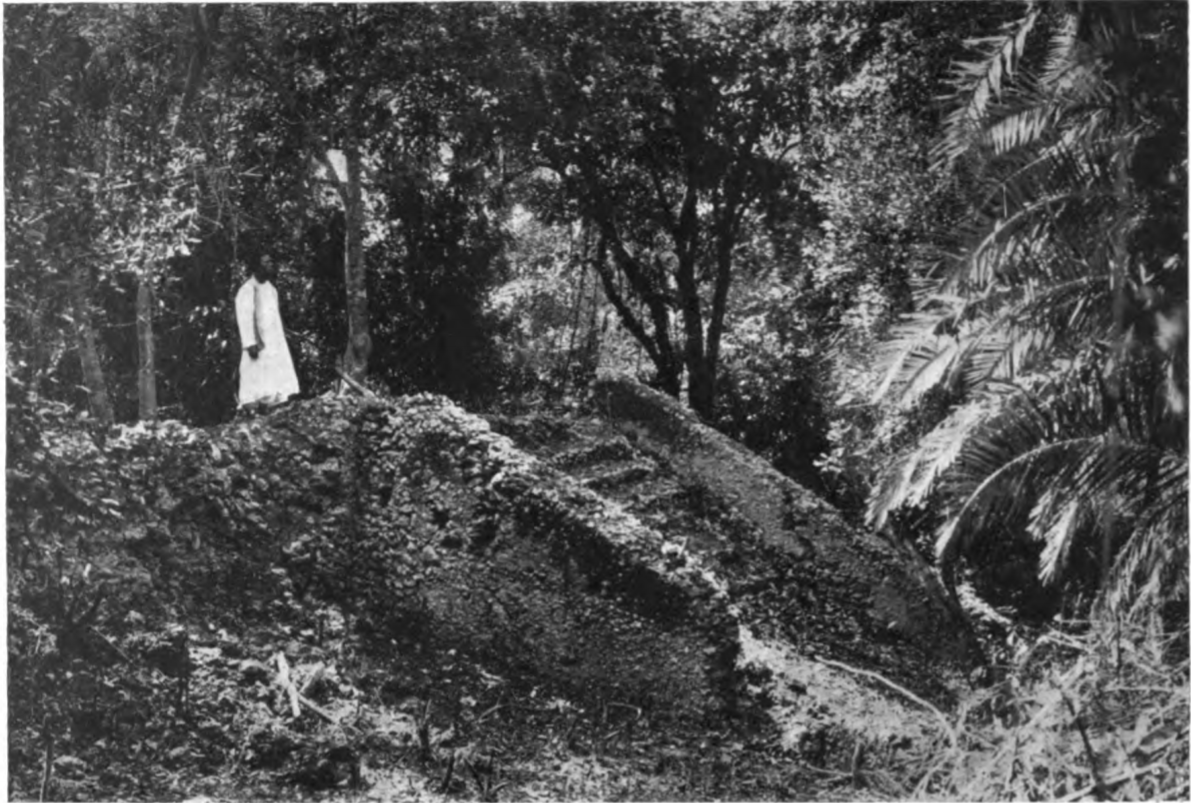
Pujini Ruins in Chake Chake District.

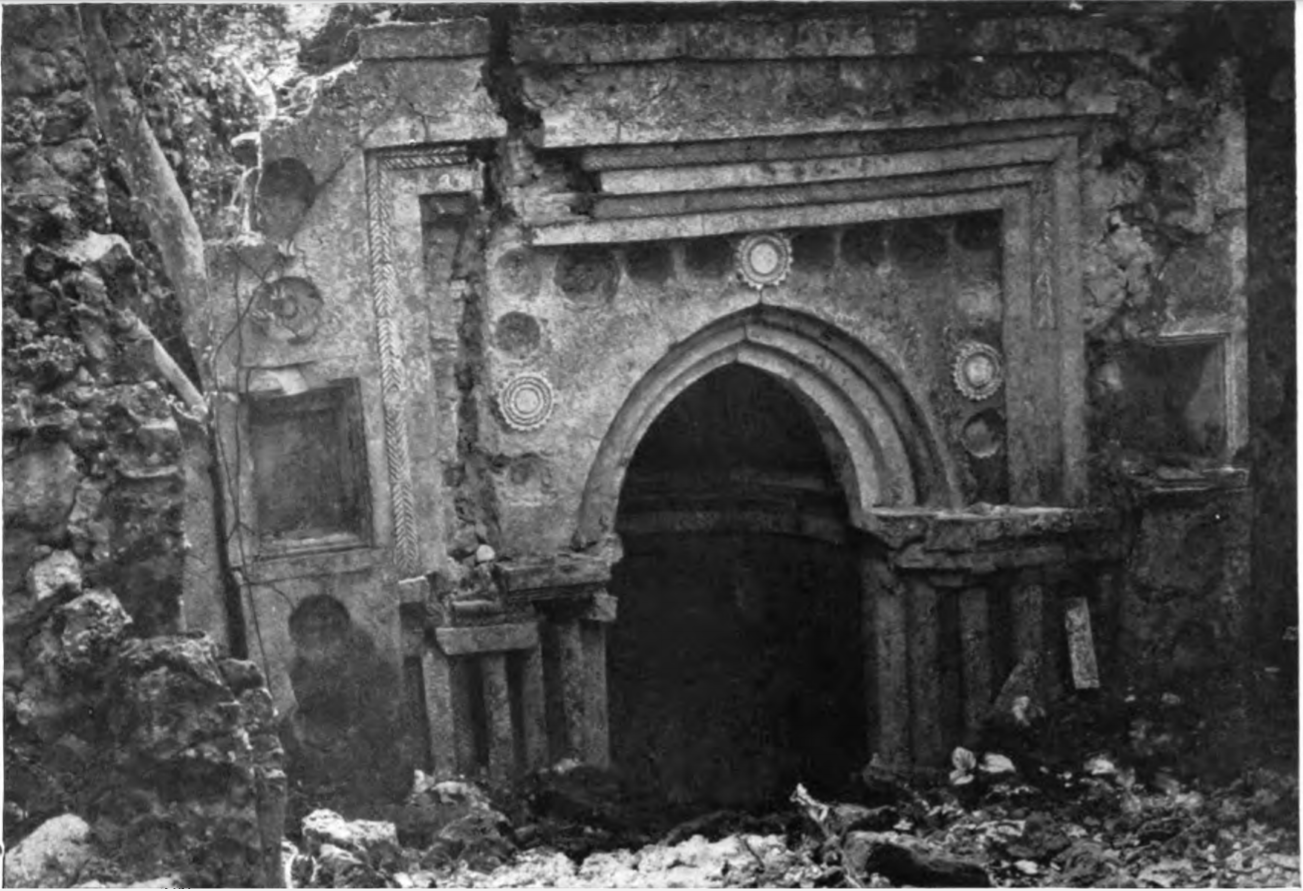
Chwaka Mosque in Micheweni District.

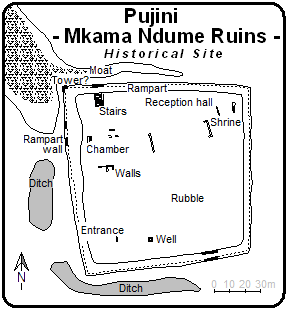
Mkama Ndume palace in Pujini, Chake Chake District.

Pemba Island is a large coral island off the coast of Tanzania. Inhabited by Bantu settlers from the Tanga coast since 600 AD, the island has a rich trading, agricultural, and religious history that has contributed to the studies of the Swahili Coast trade throughout the Indian Ocean.

The first evidence of inhabitation is in the seventh century AD at a site called Tumbe in Micheweni District of the island. Linguistic and archaeological data suggest there is potential that the first inhabitants migrated from the mainland. Towns continued to be founded around the island after Tumbe, and agricultural and ceramic artifacts show the people were farmers.

== 600–1000 AD ==
The main site on the island between 600 and 1000 AD was the city of Tumbe. There is ample evidence that this city was a trading center in the Indian Ocean. Clustered around the main city were smaller sites dating to the 8th to 10th centuries AD. The archaeobotanical evidence from Tumbe and the surrounding areas point to an agriculture system focused on pearl millet. Rice, legumes, coconut and other tree nuts were found to have been important contributors to the agricultural economy.

Ceramics were an important part of the society at Tumbe. The pottery found at Tumbe is part of the Early Tana Tradition (ETT). This pottery tradition is decorated with triangles and intersecting lines. This tradition is also found in southern Tanzania, northern Kenya, southern Mozambique and the Lamu Archipelago. This connects Pemba Island with civilizations all along the East African coast. The ceramics from Tumbe are also notable in the types of vessels that were found. Many of the ceramics that have been found are necked jars with graphite decoration. Many of the ceramic artifacts found at Tumbe were pieces of imported pottery. The pieces were mainly from Sasanian-Islamic and Siraf storage vessels.

Shell beads were another important export from Tumbe. Although the beads do not normally survive, the number of tools used to make the beads, bead grinders, can be used as a good estimation for bead production. In one excavation at the site, 3,600 bead grinders were found; far more than any other site on the East African coast. The high concentration of the grinders likely indicates that the beads were used for trade. It also shows that bead making happened in households rather than solely by specialized craftsmen.

== 1000–1300 AD ==
After the apparent abandonment of Tumbe, the city of Chwaka was established just south of Tumbe. Archaeological surveys show that the stonetown of Chwaka started as a small village and grew into a large, densely populated town. The patterns of population show that while Chwaka grew, the surrounding areas became less populated suggesting a movement of people from the countryside into towns.

The town of Chwaka is thought to be the beginning of urban patterns on Pemba Island. When archaeologists first arrived to the site there were two standing mosques. One was a large congregational mosque while the other was a smaller mosque. According to oral history, the smaller mosque was built to honor a late ruler of the town. As the excavations took place, the number of important structures grew. In all, there were a total of four mosques, at least ten stone tombs, and one significant stone home over a 500-year period. Along with the stone structures, the homes found were mainly of earthen materials.

The four mosques were all built at different times. The first was built in the eleventh century right around the time of the occupation of the site. The second stone mosque was built on a bluff in the thirteenth century. It was later enlarged and possibly remained standing until the site was abandoned. In the fourteenth century the first mosque was demolished and the third was built at the site. This mosque was much larger and more elegant than the first. An elaborate mihrab and vaulted ceilings were sophisticated for a town of Chwaka’s size. Similar to the second mosque, the third was later renovated to include more prayer space and an additional wash area. The last mosque built on the site was small and was built in the fifteenth century. The dedication to building and improving upon the mosques suggest the investment of the community as a whole, one, or many, wealthy patrons, or a combination of both.

While the small number of stone homes suggests that Chwaka had a small number of mercantile elites, the large number of stone tombs suggests a large religious elite population. Another indicator of a larger class of religious elites is the dedication to the stone architecture and design of the mosques. While the mosques have been damaged and the stone tombs are all in different stages of disarray, there is one excellent example of a Swahili pillar tomb.

Other towns throughout the island were established at this time as well. Mkia wa Ngombe, Mduuni, and Mtambwe Mkuu were established around the same time as Chwaka. Mkia wa Ngombe was a town of similar size to Chwaka and had mosques and elite homes as Chwaka did. Mkia wa Ngombe has some of the most extensive ruins on the Island. Mduuni was a smaller town among a set of eight others of similar size and composition around the island.

== Mtambwe Mkuu ==
Mtambwe Mkuu is a site in northwest Pemba and features many stone structures including a town wall, a mosque, tombs, and homes. The earliest evidence of occupation is in the eleventh century and continued, prosperously and uninterrupted until the fifteenth century. In the nineteenth century it was reoccupied. An excavation revealed a hoard of over two-thousand gold and silver coins dating to the tenth and eleventh centuries below the floor of a home at the site proving Pemba was involved with the trade networks of the time.

The site where the coins were found was pointed out to the archaeological team by local people that had previously found coins in the area. The hoard of coins was found buried in the floor of a hut. Around eight hundred coins were found at the surface while six hundred and fifty-eight were found in the excavation.

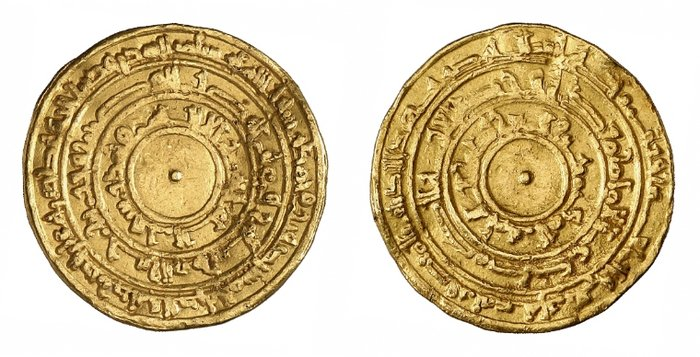
Gold dinar coin from the reign of Fatimid caliph al-Moezz li-Din Allah of the Fatimid Caliphate (953–975 AD).

Eight of the excavated coins were gold. These coins determined an estimated date of 1066 AD for the hoard. All of the gold coins, except for one, originated from the Fatimid Caliphate or were imitations of coins from the Fatimid Caliphate. The other gold coin was a dinar from the Abbasid Caliphate. The coins were minted in cities throughout the Mediterranean in the modern day countries of Egypt, Tunisia, Syria, and Lebanon demonstrating Pemba’s economic ties to the region.

Six hundred and fifty of the excavated coins were silver. Each of the coins had a name on one side and a religious motto on the reverse. This pattern is similar to that of the coins from Kilwa, an island off the coast of modern day Tanzania. The names on the coins are the same as those of rulers found in the Kilwa Chronicle as well. These similarities and the findings of similar coins to the Mtambwe series in Kilwa link the two economies.

== Influence of Islam ==
Throughout the Swahili coast many people converted to Islam throughout the first millennium AD. The speed of this religious conversion has been thought to be the result of the building of trade relations with Muslim merchants. This center of religion in the towns may have been a large factor for the movement of the populace from rural areas to the towns. The large efforts to build the four mosques at Chwaka show the dedication to religion. The possible enticement of a cohesive religious community may have made towns like Chwaka ideal.

== Portuguese colonization ==
The Portuguese arrived to Pemba Island in the sixteenth century. When they arrived the number of sites on the island began to decline sharply. There was tension on the island and throughout the East African coast between the Portuguese and the indigenous populations causing both sides began to build fortresses.

Upon their arrival, the Portuguese noted that coastal towns were politically independent from each other. This caused them to wage an attack on one city at a time. While the Portuguese were attempting to unify the coast, the opposition from Arabs and the local people caused them to fail.

== Omani rule ==
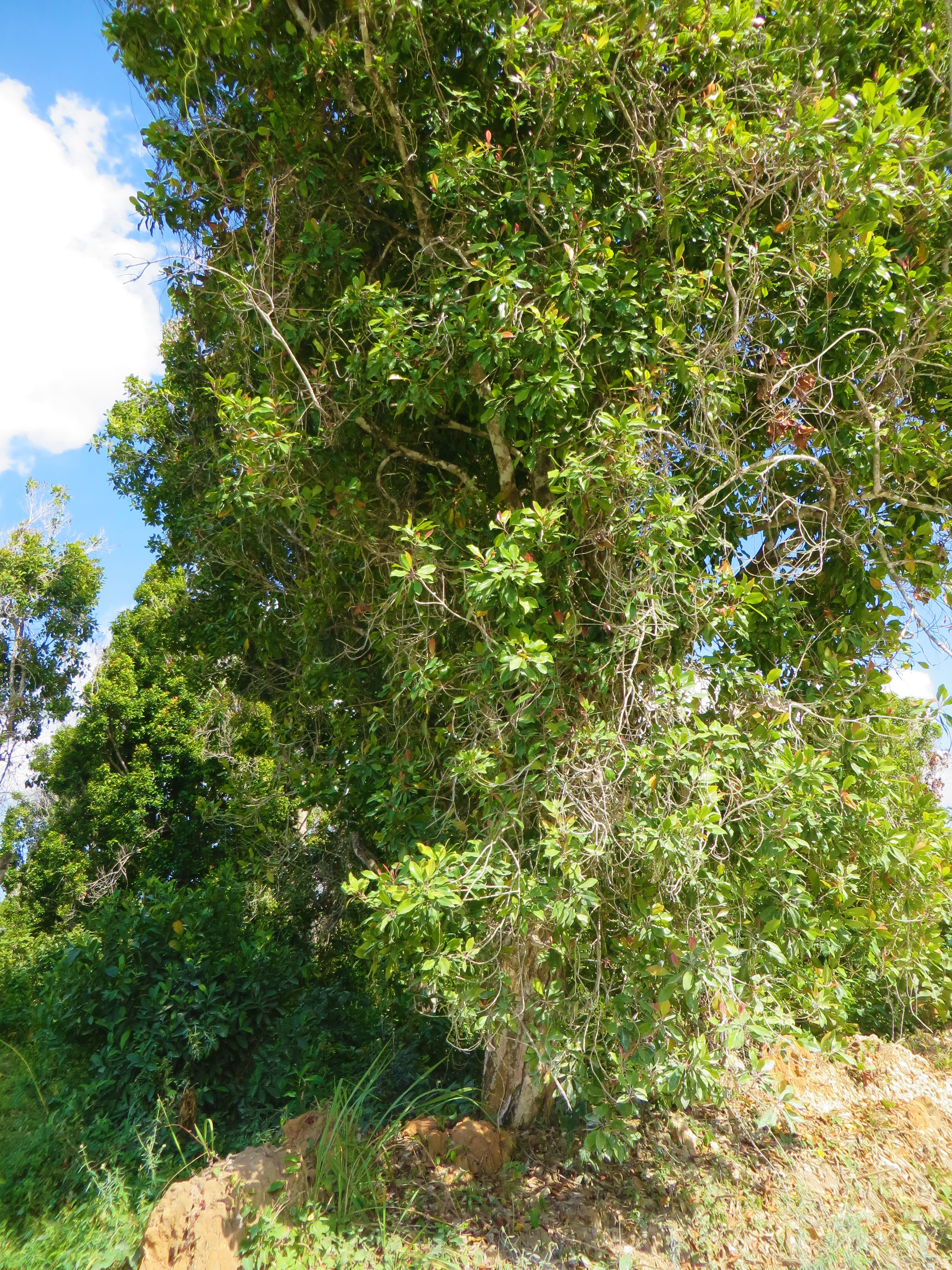
Clove tree on Pemba Island

After the failed Portuguese attempt at unification, the Omani took over the East African coast, including Pemba Island. The eighteenth century brought an increase in the number of occupied sites and a returned political stability to the region. This stability was even greater when the Omani Sultan, Said bin Sultan, moved the capital to Zanzibar during the nineteenth century.

Under Omani rule, a system of taxation was established as well as a trading organization. The slave trade market grew quickly throughout the East African coast and eventually Pemba Island made trading contracts with European countries and the Americas. Because of the centralized trade, the prosperity of the towns on Pemba was declining. In the late eighteenth century many on the islands turned to agriculture as a different economic strategy. Sugar and cloves had an expanding international market and agriculture allowed them a different option of trade goods.

When the British banned the slave trade in the nineteenth century, the economies of the main slave trading ports of East Africa, Zanzibar and Pemba, suffered. While they could not trade slaves, they could trade and export the products of slave labor. This caused many to move from maritime industries to subsistence farming and the development and growth of plantation farming. Due to this change, new infrastructure had to be built on the island including new roads and new small towns on the interior of the island. This success is the reason the Omani Sultan moved his capital to Zanzibar, bringing with him both economic and political success and stability.

== Trading contacts ==
Pemba and Zanzibar were connected to many different areas of Europe, Africa and Asia through trade as early as the first century. According to the Periplus of the Erythean sea, the leader of each town was also in charge of that town’s economic and trade system. The Periplus also notes that the Greeks, and other traders, would trade with the island for ivory, tortoise shell, rhinoceros horn, palm oil, cinnamon, frankincense, and slaves. In return, the people on Pemba would receive awls, glass, wheat, wine, daggers, and hatchets.

Other documents show Pemba was trading with multiple areas on mainland Africa and in Asia. Artifacts that support this data include pottery and glass from Asia, China and Europe as well as ochre linked to mainland Africa.

== Current archaeology ==
Archaeological research on Pemba and throughout the Swahili coast has long been focused on sites with visible stone structures. This means that sites with earthen and less-permanent architecture get neglected from research. Based on new research, however, these first millennium sites are now understood as important to understanding the development of second millennium stone towns.

The major challenges for surveying on Pemba are related mostly to the topography and vegetation of the island. It is a hilly island and has dense clove and coconut plantations as well as forests. Along with that there are many inlets that may be difficult to reach. These difficulties result in limited surveying done on the island.
