= Chwaka, Pemba =

National Historic Site of Tanzania

Chwaka Ruins
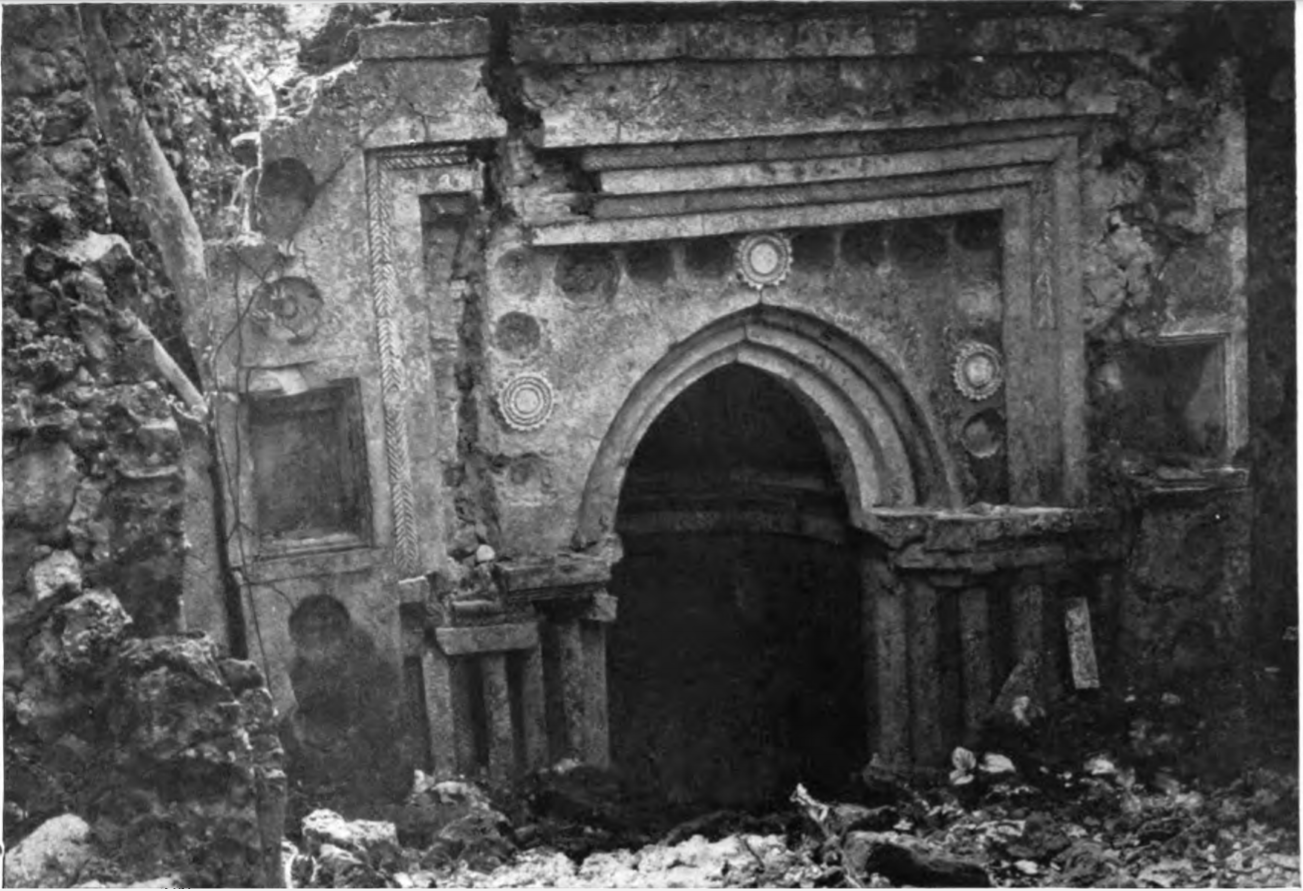
- Chwaka Mosque, Micheweni District

- Location within Tanzania
- 4°57′43.164″S 39°46′39.324″E
- Type: Settlement
- Cultures: Swahili
- Location: Micheweni District, Pemba North Region, Tanzania

History
- Built: 13th century CE
- Abandoned: 16th century CE

Site notes
- Material: Coral rag
- Architectural styles: Swahili & Islamic
- Owner: Tanzanian Government
- Management: Antiquities Division, Ministry of Natural Resources and Tourism

National Historic Sites of Tanzania
- Official name: Chwaka Historic Site
- Type: Cultural

The archaeological site of Chwaka (Swahili: Magofu ya mji wa kale wa Chwaka) is a medieval Swahili historic site next to the village of Chwaka, located in Micheweni District of Pemba North Region, Tanzania. The location is 6 km (3.7 mi) from the small town of Konde, at the end of a trail that extends 900 m (3,000 ft) in the direction of the village of Tumbe on the way to the village of Myumoni. The site is believed to be occupied from the 11th century to the 16th century CE. It is a large site for Pemba island because it covers an area of 20 hectares (49 acres), and featured a grand mosques, empt and a harbor in a nearby.

This old town is famous for its ruins of Swahili mosques and tombs as well as dispersed material remains which provide evidence for complex society. On the entire island of Pemba, these ruins are among the best kept. Also, the site provides evidence for specialized agriculture and the transitions of Swahili foodways.

== Material remains ==
=== Ruins ===
Surveys and excavations have uncovered four stone mosques built between 1050 and 1500, categorized into the original congregation mosque, the mosque by the shore, the second congregation mosque alongside the tombs, and the Choroko mosque.

==== The original congregational mosque ====
The original congregational mosque was built in the early 11th century when Chwaka town was established. It was uncovered beneath the second congregational mosque. This mosque was built on a white sand platform 1.7 m deep, whereby builders used porites coral blocks for the structure, creating a main prayer hall 6.25 m by 3.65 m and a southern room 1.4 m wide. The shallow mihrab, similar to those in other mosques in coastal towns like Kaole, was built approximately 30 cm deep, with a curved plaster lip. Archaeologists presume that the process of building this mosque was shared by everyone in the town, and that materials like sand and coral from the beach were collected together. This community participation was possibly encouraged by the need to express adherence to Islam and the transition from a rural to an urban community.

==== The mosque by the shore ====
When the original mosque had already been built, the community constructed a second mosque by the shore at the northern edge of the bluff. Construction of this mosque involved depositing a thick bed of beach sand over a midden containing late 13th-century pottery. Like the first mosque, builders used coral rag as their main building material. The mihrab was plain in design, extended to the northern wall. Additionally, they applied plaster to the block walls using lime-based mixtures, whereas the flat, mortared-stone roof was supported by three timbers. In addition, the mosque had two simple doorframes connecting the main hall to the west and another on the east side.

==== The new congregation mosque ====
During the 14th century, the new coral rag mosque was built above the original congregational mosque, which was assumed to have been destroyed by fire. The new mosque was built with coral rag, along with door frames and lintels, window casings, and mihrab architrave features in porites. The plan indicates that the mosque was originally constructed as a narrow structure, but it was later expanded to include four rooms: the main hall, the east hall, the west hall, and a smaller room to the south, which also housed a cistern. It contained barrel vaults and domes, as well as a grand entrance staircase. The mihrab design, featuring elaborate cut-coral embellishments_comprises 22 inset Chinese bowls, three inset porites sunburst-style bosses, and rectangular niches purposely designed to hold lamps, copies of the Quran, and other decorative objects. This mihrab, along with the building’s scale at its largest and its ceiling, distinguished it from all other mosques on Pemba and put it in line with those at Kilwa Kisiwani. Archaeologists assume that the mosque architects were relocated to coastal towns to find communities in need of constructing mosques. In addition, Fleisher argues that the unique design of this mosque was intended to reinforce power through its display of imported materials, which indicate powerful elites who were able to control prestigious and rare goods.

==== Msikiti Choroko (Mosque of the Peas) ====
This small, domed, rag mosque with mortared cupolas was built in the late 15th century. It has three octagonal columns standing on square bases. The mihrab is plain with a pointed arch and two small windows above. Though the recent structure shows the complete mosque due to the modern reconstruction, the 1920s report indicates that the roof had fallen. Additional windows, a niche, and a courtyard are located in the east and west walls, whereas the cistern is located in the east courtyard.

=== Tombs ===
Outside the congregational mosque, there are 10 tombs, a two pillar tomb built in mortared coral rag. The first pillar tomb, which is roofless and triangular, has been called Haruni’s Tomb since the 20th century. It was embellished with shallow niches, glazed tiles, and several bas-reliefs in mortar, such as a siwa (a side-blown horn). The second pillar tomb is located just north of the congregational mosque’s mihrab. The remaining 8 tombs, which are low rectangular mortared enclosures, mostly sit near the second pillar tomb. Site dating suggests that the tombs were likely built during the time of the second congregational mosque.Archaeologists assume that these tombs represent the status of the powerful families who, due to their wealth, held power over the mosques and the Muslim community of Chwaka. Their placement outside the congregational mosque was purposely settled to be remembered by the community, especially those faithful muslims who attend the mosque multiple times a day.

=== Houses ===
Test excavations also located non-stone structures, which are assumed to be earthen houses and earthen walls. This was indicated by the presence of many kilos of burned daub, which suggests close proximity to several earth-and-thatch houses. Other uncovered features associated with house structures.

=== Artifacts ===
Archaeologists have uncovered a rich artifacts in Chwaka, including 52,000 sherds of local pottery and more than 600 sherds of imported pottery. Also, over 1,500 artifacts of other finds were discovered, including fragments of glass vessels; bead grinders together with glass and carnelian beads; iron slag and tuyeres, copper and lead fragments; spindle whorls; fragments of lamps and groundstones; and unmodified shell, bone, and coral materials. To date, this density of local pottery are considered slightly higher than any other coastal sites of Chwaka’s size.

==== Ceramics ====
Pemban ceramics, prior to the introduction of Chwaka town, were characterized by restricted ceramic vessels, such as pots and jars, which featured narrow mouths. However, after AD 1100, the dominant ceramics were unrestricted vessels, including open bowls, wide-mouthed jars, and platters. These materials were found to share decorative and morphological similarities with those found in other stone towns, such as Kilwa and Shanga. The punctate vessels and incised jars, which were popular in most of the Swahili towns, were found in small quantities in Chwaka. There was a significant transformation in vessel morphology and styles across all Swahili towns, including Chwak, over time. In addition, the red-painted bowls appeared to be popular and in high quantity in Chwaka during Period 4, likely due to their association with feasting.

== Main economic activities ==
The limited quantity of stone architecture in Chwaka suggests that the site had minimal engagement with long-distance trade compared to other economic activities. Material remains reveal diverse activities, including specialized agriculture, fishing, iron production, and cloth making, among others.

=== Agriculture ===
Findings from botanical remains indicate that the Chwakan people became specialized producers of cotton, as well as the Asian crops rice and coconut, used for fiber, tools, and fuel, as well as other taxa of fruits and nuts. Between the 11th and 15th centuries, people became heavily reliant on Asian foodways, particularly rice, during the period of Islamization and urbanization, replacing pearl millet, which had been the primary staple food for a long time. Archaeobotanist Walshaw uncovered rice grains and/or chaff in all samples (100% ubiquity) and over 4,000 rice spikelet bases (rachillae), among other chaff elements, whereas the pearl millet was only the fourth most common identifiable seed taxon, indicating its minimum production.

=== Trade ===
The small quantity of stone houses in Chwaka may suggests that the town was less invested in long distance trade rather than in agriculture and craft production. Also, the presence of imported materials, such as pottery and glass, stone and glass beads, and personal items, indicates that imported goods flowed steadily into Chwaka, though their small quantities compared to local materials may suggest poor investment in this long distance trade.

== Transition of foodways, Feasting, and Power construction ==
The assemblages of religious architecture, extensive rice production, and changes in ceramic forms are linked with the existence of ritual feasting conducted in Chwaka. The dramatic changes of pottery forms suggest the transition of foodways in cooking methods and types of food. Archaeologist have found the significant changes of pottery design from closed to open vessels during the peak period of rice production. The shallow open bowls and jars have been associated with the new mode of cooking and serving rice, as opposed to those prepared with millets, such as porridge. At the sametime, the quality and quantity of serving objects, such as red slip vessels, which indicate public display, suggest the presence of special events like feasting.

Feasting was an integral part of the general hospitality extended to merchants and guests, as dictated by Islamic standards of generosity and hospitality. It was also a crucial element of the rites of passage ceremonies, including weddings, funerals, Maulid and the installation of new leaders. It is argued that the power was not only exhibited in these structures but was also negotiated and established through feasts of competitive generosity, which involved displaying wealth and offering food and drinks to the public. Additionally, it has been suggested that the bowls cemented into the mihrab may have symbolized the feasting associated with each of these architectural forms, serving as reminders of meals eaten and yet to be provided, as well as the moment of food consumption.

== Oral tradition ==
Like many other Swahili old towns, the history of Chwaka is embedded with oral traditions. According to local community, the late 15th mosque was called the Choroko mosque because the mortar used to construct it was mixed with peas (choroko); however, this is not evident archaeologically. In addition, oral traditions associate a leader known as Haruni with the pillar tomb and the Choroko mosque, which draws attention to an individual and family. Stories informed that this mosque was credited to Mfalme Haruni by one of her widows.

== Conclusion ==
In general, Chwaka is a unique type of Swahili stonetown, primarily because it was densely populated and economically successful in its region. The merchant invested more of their wealth in ritual architecture as opposed to stone houses like in other Swahili towns. It can be concluded that the Chwaka architecture was established for growing Islam, but at the same time for building a reputation for the wealthier people who sponsor the construction of those mosques.

== See also ==
- Historic Swahili settlements
- Archaeology of Pemba Island
