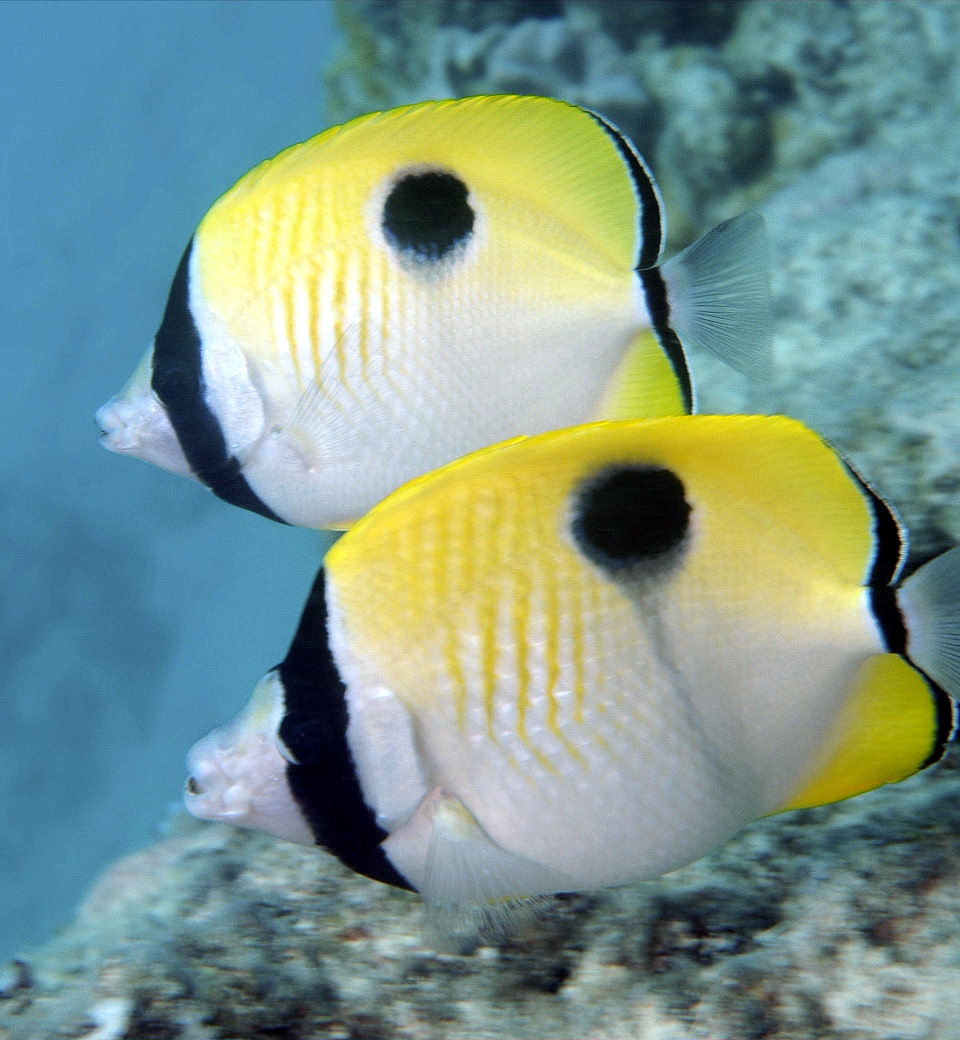

Conservation status
- Least Concern (IUCN 3.1)

Scientific classification
- Kingdom: Animalia
- Phylum: Chordata
- Class: Actinopterygii
- Division: Teleostei
- Order: Acanthuriformes
- Family: Chaetodontidae
- Genus: Chaetodon
- Subgenus: Lepidochaetodon
- Species: C. unimaculatus

Binomial name
- Chaetodon unimaculatus Bloch, 1787

Synonyms
- Heterochaetodon lepidochaetodon unimaculatus (Bloch, 1787); Chaetodon sphenospilus Jenkins, 1901

= Teardrop butterflyfish =

Species of fish

The teardrop butterflyfish (Chaetodon unimaculatus) is a species of marine ray-finned fish, a butterflyfish belonging to the (family Chaetodontidae. It is found in the Indo-Pacific region.

== Description ==
The teardrop butterflyfish has a whitish body with yellow dorsal, anal and pelvic fins, this yellow colour extends on to the back. The upper flank is marked with a large teardrop shaped black blotch and there is a wide, black, vertical bar though the eye. There are delicate yellowish-orange chevrons on the flanks in front of the black teardrop and there is another black vertical band with runs from the rear of the dorsal fin, across the caudal peduncle to the rear of the anal fin. The dorsal fin contains 12–13 spines and 19–23 soft rays while the anal fin contains 3 spines and 18–20 soft rays. This species attains a maximum total length of 20 centimetres (7.9 in), although around 16 centimetres (6.3 in) is more usual.

== Distribution ==
The teardrop butterflyfish is found in the eastern Indian and western Pacific Oceans from Christmas Island and Cocos (Keeling) Island east as far as Hawaii, the Marquesas and Ducie Island, north as far as Southern Japan, and south to Lord Howe in the Tasman Sea and the central coast of New South Wales.

== Habitat and biology ==
Teradrop butterflyfish are normally encountered in small groups in reef flats, clear lagoon and seaward reefs where they feed on soft and hard corals, as well as polychaetes, small crustaceans and filamentous algae. This is an oviparous species and they are monogamous with the sexes forming pairs to breed. These fishes may be found at depths of 1 to 60 metres (3.3 to 196.9 ft) and they are most numerous where the leathery corals of the genera Sarcophyton and Sinularia grow.

== Taxonomy ==
The teardrop butterflyfish was first formally described in 1787 by the German medical doctor and zoologist Marcus Elieser Bloch (1723–1799) with the type locality give as the East Indies, i.e. Indonesia. In the western Indian Ocean it is replaced by the yellow teardrop butterflyfish (Chaetodon interruptus), now a separate species but previously considered a subspecies of Chaetodon unimaculatus.

In its subgenus Lepidochaetodon it is sometimes considered a separate genus. It is only distantly related to other Chaetodon species such as the sunburst butterflyfish (Chaetodon kleinii) and the Tahiti butterflyfish (Chaetodon trichrous).

== Utilisation ==
The teardrop butterflyfish is relatively common in the aquarium trade. It is caught by some artisanal fisheries.
