= Ras Mkumbuu =

Coordinates: 5.214559°S 39.666510°E

Ras Mkumbuu is a long narrow peninsula on the central west coast of Pemba Island, one of the two main islands of Tanzania's Zanzibar Archipelago. The town of Chake-Chake, one of the island's main population centres, is located immediately to the south of it on Chake-Chake Bay. The peninsula stretches due west for 12 kilometres, tapering to only a few tens of metres wide at its narrowest point. The peninsula, along with Fundo Island to the north, forms part of a natural breakwater which provides a calm harbour for the northern town of Wete.

Ras Mkumbuu was an important site in Pemba's history, being the site one of the island's most important early settlements, Qanbalu, which is now a ruin. The small village of Ngagu is now the peninsula's main settlement.
