= Wete =

Capital of North Pemba Region, Tanzania

Coordinates: 5°03′24″S 39°43′41″E

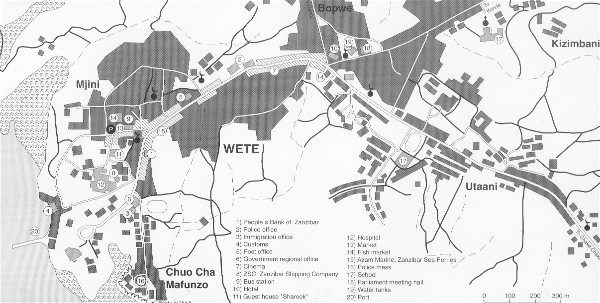
Map of Wete

Wete is a town located on the Tanzanian island of Pemba. It is the capital of Pemba North Region, as well as the administrative seat for Wete District. It lies on the west side of the northern part of the island. The town has a population of 35,951 in 2022. The harbor at Wete was a major port-of-entry for accessing the Pemba island.

== History ==
Pemba was called as "The Green Island" by early Arab settlers. It was part of Sultanate of Oman in the 17th century, before being ceded to the British. The region formed an important part of the spice trade from East Africa to India via Arabia.

== Geography ==
Wete is located on the west side of the northern part of the island of Pemba. It is the capital and largest city of Pemba North Region, as well as the administrative seat for Wete District. The region has rich natural resources, and a varied ecosystem with coral reefs, and mangrove forests. To the southwest of Wete is the small island of Matambwe, the site of Swahili ruins of a medieval town called Mtambwe Kuu.

=== Climate ===
Wete has a tropical climate, milder than Tanzania's mainland and Unguja island. This climate is classified as a tropical monsoon climate (Am) by the Köppen system. The average temperature in Wete is 25.5 °C or 77.9 °F. The average annual rainfall is 1,714 millimetres or 67 inches. The monthly average temperatures are usually between 23.6 and 27.2 °C (74.5 and 81.0 °F). There are two rainy seasons, with most rainfall coming between March and June and smaller rain season occurring between November and December. Drier months are January and February, plus a longer drier season between July and October.

Climate data for Wete
Month	Jan	Feb	Mar	Apr	May	Jun	Jul	Aug	Sep	Oct	Nov	Dec	Year
Mean daily maximum °C (°F)	30.8 (87.4)	31.5 (88.7)	31.7 (89.1)	30.1 (86.2)	28.8 (83.8)	28.5 (83.3)	27.8 (82.0)	28.0 (82.4)	28.8 (83.8)	29.6 (85.3)	30.1 (86.2)	30.7 (87.3)	29.7 (85.5)
Daily mean °C (°F)	26.7 (80.1)	27.1 (80.8)	27.2 (81.0)	26.4 (79.5)	25.2 (77.4)	24.5 (76.1)	23.7 (74.7)	23.6 (74.5)	24.1 (75.4)	24.9 (76.8)	25.7 (78.3)	26.5 (79.7)	25.5 (77.9)
Mean daily minimum °C (°F)	22.7 (72.9)	22.7 (72.9)	22.8 (73.0)	22.7 (72.9)	21.7 (71.1)	20.5 (68.9)	19.6 (67.3)	19.2 (66.6)	19.4 (66.9)	20.2 (68.4)	21.4 (70.5)	22.4 (72.3)	21.3 (70.3)
Average rainfall mm (inches)	66 (2.6)	51 (2.0)	134 (5.3)	410 (16.1)	378 (14.9)	121 (4.8)	80 (3.1)	50 (2.0)	37 (1.5)	92 (3.6)	181 (7.1)	114 (4.5)	1,714 (67.5)
Source: Climate-Data.ORG

== Demographics and economy ==
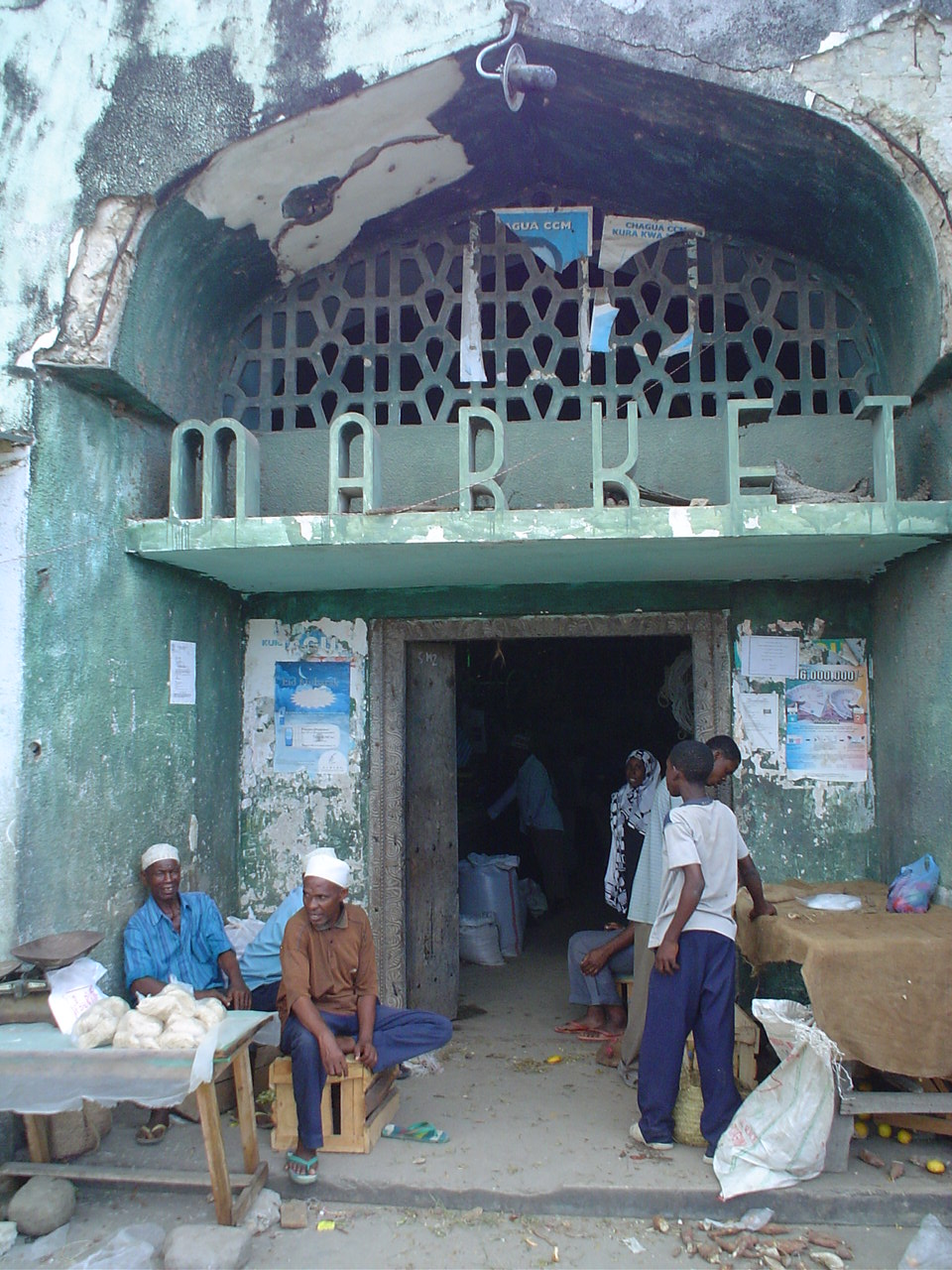
Market building in Wete

The town has a population of 35,951 in 2022. The region's fertile landscape has long made it suitable for agriculture—especially for clove production, which still dominates its economy. Fishing, livestock, and tourism are the other contributors to the economy. The region is also culturally significant for its long-standing traditions in voodoo and spiritual healing, drawing visitors from across East Africa seeking remedies.

The harbor at Wete was a major port-of-entry for accessing the Pemba island. though in recent years, it has been complemented by Mkoani. Dhows, the traditional Arab sailing vessels, have remained integral to the region’s maritime trade and identity, and are still operated on routes connecting Wete with Shimoni in Kenya, and Northern Mozambique.
