= Tumbe =

National Historic Site of Tanzania

- Location within Tanzania
- 4°56′51.72″S 39°47′14.28″E
- Type: Settlement
- Location: Micheweni District, Pemba North Region, Tanzania

History
- Built: 600 CE
- Abandoned: 17th century CE

Site notes
- Material: Coral rag
- Architectural styles: Swahili & Islamic
- Owner: Tanzanian Government
- Management: Antiquities Division, Ministry of Natural Resources and Tourism

National Historic Sites of Tanzania
- Official name: Tumbe Historic Site
- Type: Cultural

Tumbe (Magofu ya mji wa kale wa Tumbe in Swahili ) is an early Medieval Swahili historic site next to the village of Tumbe located in Micheweni District of Pemba North Region. Between 600 and 1000 AD, the city of Tumbe served as the island's primary location. There is sufficient evidence that this city served as a major commerce hub for the Indian Ocean. Smaller sites from the eighth to tenth centuries AD were grouped together around the major metropolis.

At Tumbe, ceramics had a significant role in society. The Tumbe pottery comes from the Early Tana Tradition (ETT). Triangles and crossing lines are used as decorations on this pottery style. Additionally, this custom is practiced in the Lamu Archipelago, southern Mozambique, northern Kenya, and southern Tanzania. This links Pemba Island to the cultures that exist around the coast of East Africa. The varieties of vessels that were discovered are another noteworthy aspect of Tumbe pottery. The majority of the discovered ceramics are necked jars with graphite decorations.Imported pottery made up a large portion of the ceramic objects discovered at Tumbe. The pieces were mostly from Siraf storage boats and Sasanian-Islamic vessels.

== See also ==
- Historic Swahili Settlements
- Archaeology of Pemba Island
