= Chake-Chake Bay =

Bay of Pemba Island, Tanzania

- Location in Tanzania Chake-Chake Bay (Africa) Chake-Chake Bay (Earth)
- Coordinates: 5°15′S 39°40′E
- Ocean/sea sources: Indian Ocean
- Basin countries: Tanzania
- Max. length: 5 km (3.1 mi)
- Islands: Pemba Island
- Website: www.tanzania.go.tz

Chake-Chake Bay is a large indentation in the central west coast of Pemba Island, one of the two main islands of Tanzania's Zanzibar Archipelago.

== Geography ==
The town of Chake-Chake, one of the island's main population centres, is located in the central coast of the bay.

The bay is not particularly wide, stretching for only five kilometres from north to south, but it is deep, lying between two long peninsulas, Ras Tundua in the south and Ras Mkumbuu in the north. The latter peninsula was the site of one of the island's most important early settlements, Qanbalu, which is now a ruin.
