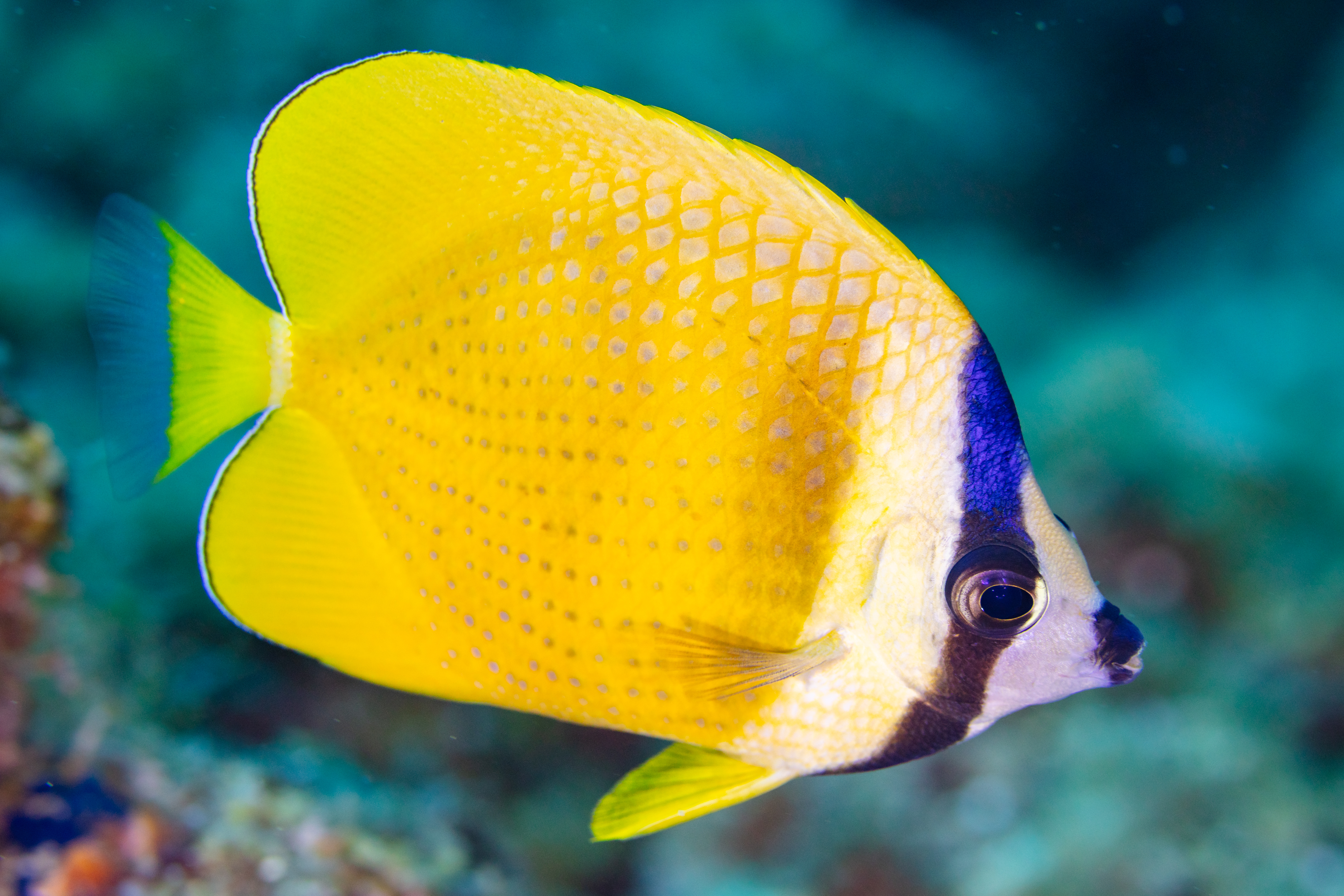
- Western color morph off the coast of Madagascar

Conservation status
- Least Concern (IUCN 3.1)

Scientific classification
- Kingdom: Animalia
- Phylum: Chordata
- Class: Actinopterygii
- Division: Teleostei
- Order: Acanthuriformes
- Family: Chaetodontidae
- Genus: Chaetodon
- Subgenus: Lepidochaetodon
- Species: C. kleinii

Binomial name
- Chaetodon kleinii Bloch, 1790

Synonyms
- List: Anisochaetodon kleinii (Bloch, 1790); Exornator exornator kleinii (Bloch, 1790); Chaetodon melastomus Bloch & Schneider, 1801; Chaetodon melammystax Bloch & Schneider, 1801; Chaetodon flavescens Bennett, 1831; Chaetodon virescens Cuvier, 1831; Chaetodon bellulus Thiollière, 1857; Chaetodon corallicola Snyder, 1904; Chaetodon cingulatus Fowler, 1934

= Sunburst butterflyfish =

Species of fish

The sunburst butterflyfish (Chaetodon kleinii), also known as the black-lipped butterflyfish, "blacklip butterflyfish" or Klein's butterflyfish, is a species of marine ray-finned fish, a butterflyfish belonging to the family Chaetodontidae. This is an Indo-Pacific species of reef habitats.

== Description ==
The body of this fish is yellowish brown with 1–2 broad lighter vertical bars, one running from near the origin of the dorsal spine to the belly, and sometimes another running from the middle of the back to the center of the body. A black bar runs vertically across the eye, and the part before this is whitish, with a black snout. The color varies somewhat across the range; western specimens usually have one beige bar, while eastern ones have two white bars. There may be numerous dotted horizontal stripes on the sides or another dark band between the two light ones in eastern specimens.

== Distribution ==
It is a native of the Indo-Pacific region, from the Red Sea and East Africa to the Hawaiian Islands and Samoa, north to southern Japan, south to Australia and New Caledonia. It is also found in the Galapagos Islands in the Eastern Pacific.

== Habitat and biology ==
The sunburst butterflyfish is found at depths of 4–61 meters, usually in deeper lagoons and channels and seaward reefs, swimming singly, or (particularly during breeding) in pairs. These fish are oviparous.

They are omnivores, feeding mainly on soft coral polyps (especially Litophyton viridis and Sarcophyton tracheliophorum), algae and zooplankton. In the aquarium, Chaetodon kleinii will eat meaty food such as mysis. Its coral-eating habits can become a nuisance, but on the other hand, they are fond of Aiptasia, small sea anemones that often become a pest in seawater aquaria.

== Taxonomy and etymology ==
The sunburst butterflyfish was first formally described in 1790 by the German naturalist and physician Marcus Elieser Bloch (1723–1799) with the type locality given as the East Indies (Ostindien). The specific name honours the German jurist, historian, botanist, zoologist and mathematician Jacob Theodor Klein (1685–1759) who illustrated this species in volume 4 of his 5-volume history of fishes, which drew Bloch's attention.

Under its junior synonym, C. corallicola was placed in the monotypic subgenus Tifia, but this cannot be separated from the earlier-described Lepidochaetodon (sometimes considered a separate genus). It appears to be closer to the Tahiti butterflyfish (C. trichrous) than to the teardrop butterflyfish (C. unimaculatus).
