= Pemba Island =

Tanzanian island of the Zanzibar Archipelago

Pemba
Nickname: الجزيرة الخضراء Al Jazeera al Khizra
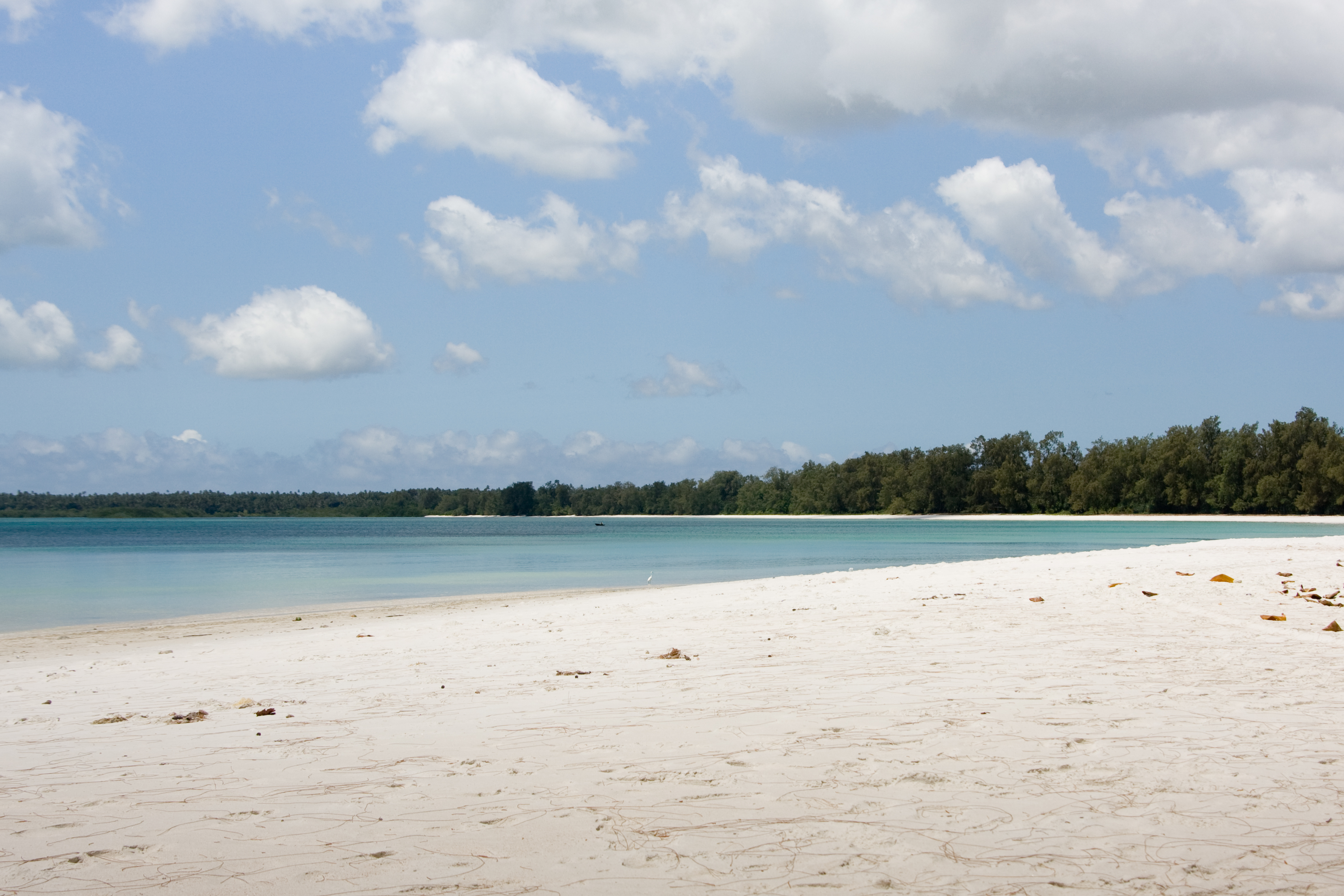
- Vumawimbi Beach, Pemba Island

- Location in Tanzania Pemba Island (Africa)

Geography
- Location: Indian Ocean
- Coordinates: 5°10′S 39°47′E
- Area: 988 km^{2} (381 sq mi)
- Highest elevation: 119 m (390 ft)
- Highest point: Masingini Ridge

Administration
- Tanzania
- Region: Zanzibar
- Capital city: Chake Chake
- Largest settlement: Wete

Demographics
- Population: 543,441 (Census 2022)
- Pop. density: 550/km^{2} (1420/sq mi)

Additional information
- Official website: Country website

Pemba Island (Arabic: الجزيرة الخضراء, al-Jazīra al-khadrāʔ; Swahili: Kisiwa cha Pemba) is a Tanzanian island forming part of the Zanzibar Archipelago, lying within the Swahili Coast in the Indian Ocean.

== Geography ==
The main islands of the Zanzibar Archipelago: Unguja (left) and Pemba (right)

With a land area of 988 square kilometres (381 sq mi) it is situated about 50 kilometres (25 nautical miles) north of Unguja, the largest island of the archipelago.

Surrounded by relatively deep water, the island of Pemba is thought to have been a part of the mainland which split off along the Pemba rift approximately 10 million years ago. In 1964, Zanzibar was united with the former colony of Tanganyika to form Tanzania. It lies 50 kilometres (25 nmi) east of mainland Tanzania, across the Pemba Channel. Together with Mafia Island (south of Unguja), these islands form the Spice Islands (not to be confused with the Maluku Islands of Indonesia).

Most of the island, which is hillier and more fertile than Unguja, is dominated by small scale farming. There is also large scale farming of cash crops such as cloves.

In previous years, the island was seldom visited due to inaccessibility and a reputation for political violence, with the notable exception of those drawn by its reputation as a center for traditional medicine and witchcraft. There is a quite large Arab community on the island, who immigrated from Oman. The population is a mix of Arab and original Waswahili inhabitants of the island. A significant portion of the population also identifies as Shirazi people. The overwhelming majority of the island's population follows Islam and identify as Muslim.

The most important towns in Pemba are Chake-Chake (the capital), Mkoani, and Wete, which is the largest city. The centrally located Chake-Chake is perched on a mound with a view to the west on a bay and the tiny Misali Island, where the tides determine when a dhow can enter the local harbour. Pemba is, with the exception of a strip of land along its eastern coast, a very fertile place: besides clove trees, the locals grow mainly rice, coconut, bananas, cassava, and red beans (called maharagwe in the Swahili language).

Pemba is home to several dive sites, with steep drop-offs, untouched coral, and very abundant marine life.

=== Islets ===
- Fundo – is located few miles from Wete. It is the only inhabited island among the group of islets forming the north-west reef of Pemba. The other islets there include Njao, Kashani, Kokota, Funzi, and Uvinje.
  - Njao – is the northernmost islet on the Fundo group. It is mainly used for agricultural purposes.
  - Kashani – is on the same reef as Fundo but on the southernmost tip close to Ras Mkumbuu.
  - Kokota – is located at the southern mouth of Wete port.
  - Funzi – lies east of Kokota and south of Uvinje island.
  - Uvinje – is used for farming and located at the southern mouth of Wete port.
- Kiweni (Shamiani) – located on the south west part of Pemba, it is an uninhabited islet used mainly for farming and livestock grazing. On its southernmost tip it has a very fine beach and some prospective investors were building a hotel in the late 1990s.
- Kojani – is the only inhabited island on the western side of Pemba island. It is home to some skilled artisanal fishermen in East Africa who seasonally travel to most parts of the coast in search of schools of fish to catch.
- Kwata – the island was the site of the first major outbreak of cholera in 1978 when travelers were temporarily quarantined at this island before being allowed into Pemba.
- Makoongwe – is few kilometers from Mkoani. It has characteristics similar to the opposite area on the island of Pemba with deep soils and hilly terrain. Makoongwe is inhabited and people do farming and fishing.
- Matumbini – is an islet with dense mangrove forest and popular among fishermen due to the presence of rich coral reef.
- Misali – has a rich coral reef, and has been declared a marine reserve.
- Mwangi – is a small islet close to Mtambwe on the main island of Pemba.
- Panza – is the southernmost island in Pemba and in fact is a series of islets but a bridge connects the two main parts of Mtondooni and Panza proper. Its topography is coral on the Panza side and deep soil on the Mtondooni part. Its inhabitants do farming and fishing.
- Vikunguni – is a small islet close to the north-west group of islands.
- Yombi – is a small islet east of Panza island.

=== Important Bird Area ===
Pemba has been designated an Important Bird Area (IBA) by BirdLife International because it supports populations of Pemba green pigeons, Pemba scops owls, Pemba white-eyes and Pemba sunbirds.

== Climate ==
Pemba has a tropical climate, yet somewhat milder than Tanzania's mainland and milder than in Unguja island. This climate is classified as "Aw" by the Köppen-Geiger system. The average temperature in Chake Chake is 25.5 °C (77.9 °F). The average annual rainfall is 1,364 mm. The monthly average temperatures are usually between 24 and 27.4 °C (75.2 and 81.3 °F). There are two rain seasons, with most rainfall coming between April and May and smaller rain season coming between November and December. Drier months are January and February, and a longer drier season between June and October.

Climate data for Chake Chake
Month	Jan	Feb	Mar	Apr	May	Jun	Jul	Aug	Sep	Oct	Nov	Dec	Year
Mean daily maximum °C (°F)	30.9 (87.6)	31.6 (88.9)	31.9 (89.4)	30.1 (86.2)	28.9 (84.0)	28.5 (83.3)	27.8 (82.0)	28.1 (82.6)	28.8 (83.8)	29.7 (85.5)	30.2 (86.4)	30.8 (87.4)	29.8 (85.6)
Daily mean °C (°F)	26.8 (80.2)	27.1 (80.8)	27.4 (81.3)	26.3 (79.3)	25.3 (77.5)	24.6 (76.3)	23.7 (74.7)	23.7 (74.7)	24.1 (75.4)	25.0 (77.0)	25.9 (78.6)	26.6 (79.9)	25.5 (77.9)
Mean daily minimum °C (°F)	22.8 (73.0)	22.7 (72.9)	22.9 (73.2)	22.6 (72.7)	21.8 (71.2)	20.7 (69.3)	19.7 (67.5)	19.3 (66.7)	19.5 (67.1)	20.3 (68.5)	21.6 (70.9)	22.5 (72.5)	21.4 (70.5)
Average precipitation mm (inches)	86 (3.4)	71 (2.8)	134 (5.3)	304 (12.0)	291 (11.5)	74 (2.9)	42 (1.7)	27 (1.1)	21 (0.8)	54 (2.1)	129 (5.1)	131 (5.2)	1,364 (53.7)
Source: Climate-Data.ORG

== Archaeology ==
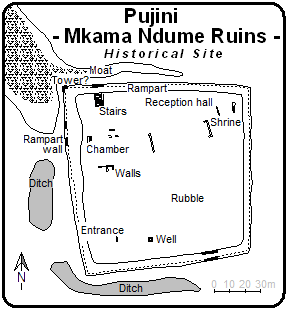
The Mkama Ndume ruins at Pujini village

Archaeological research on Pemba has shown its centrality to the Swahili coast trading system as early as 600 AD. Along the northern coast, urban settlements at Chwaka later developed and flourished from the eleventh century to ~1500 AD.

West of Pemba's capital Chake-Chake, on a long stretched peninsula called Ras Mkumbuu, one can find some of the oldest and best preserved series of early ruins on the islands (Ndagoni ruins, probably 14th century).

East of Chake-Chake one can find the Mkama Ndume ruins at Pujini village (south of the airport) within easy reach by road from Chake-Chake. This is the only known early fortification on the whole Swahili Coast; it is dated to the fifteenth century.

== History ==
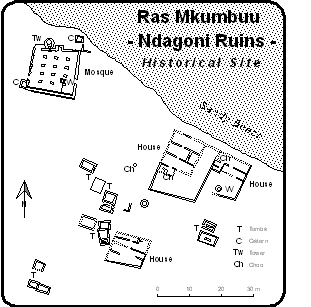
The Ndagoni ruins at Ras Mkumbuu

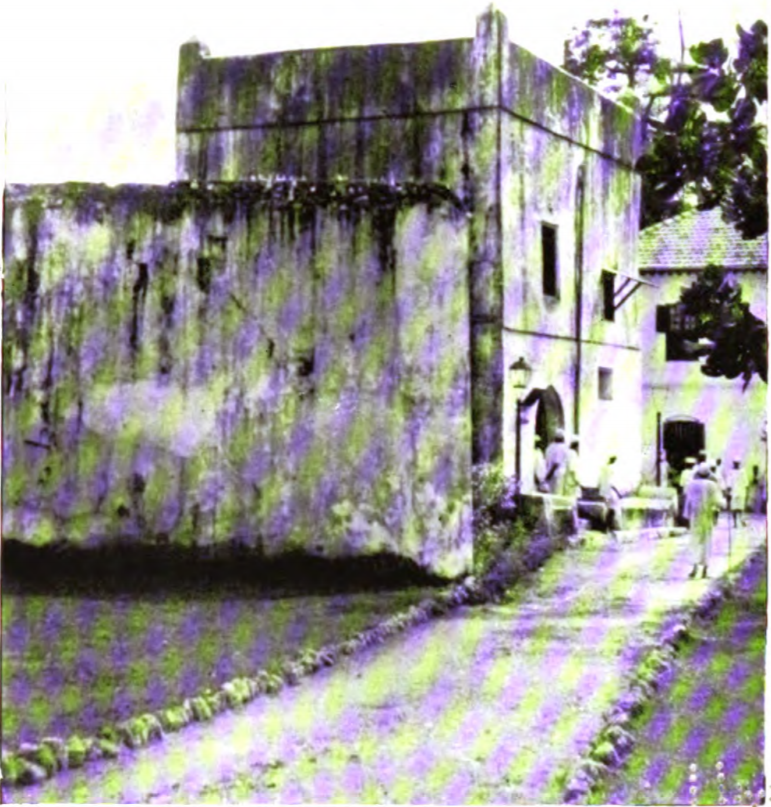
Old Portuguese Fort in Chake-Chake

According to the Arab geographer Yaqut al-Hamawi, two independent sultans in the mid-13th century ruled over parts of Pemba Island.

On 24 June 2016, the Australian Minister for Infrastructure, Transport and Regional Development, Darren Chester, said that a piece of aircraft debris was found on Pemba Island, possibly being from the missing Malaysia Airlines Flight 370.

== Administration ==
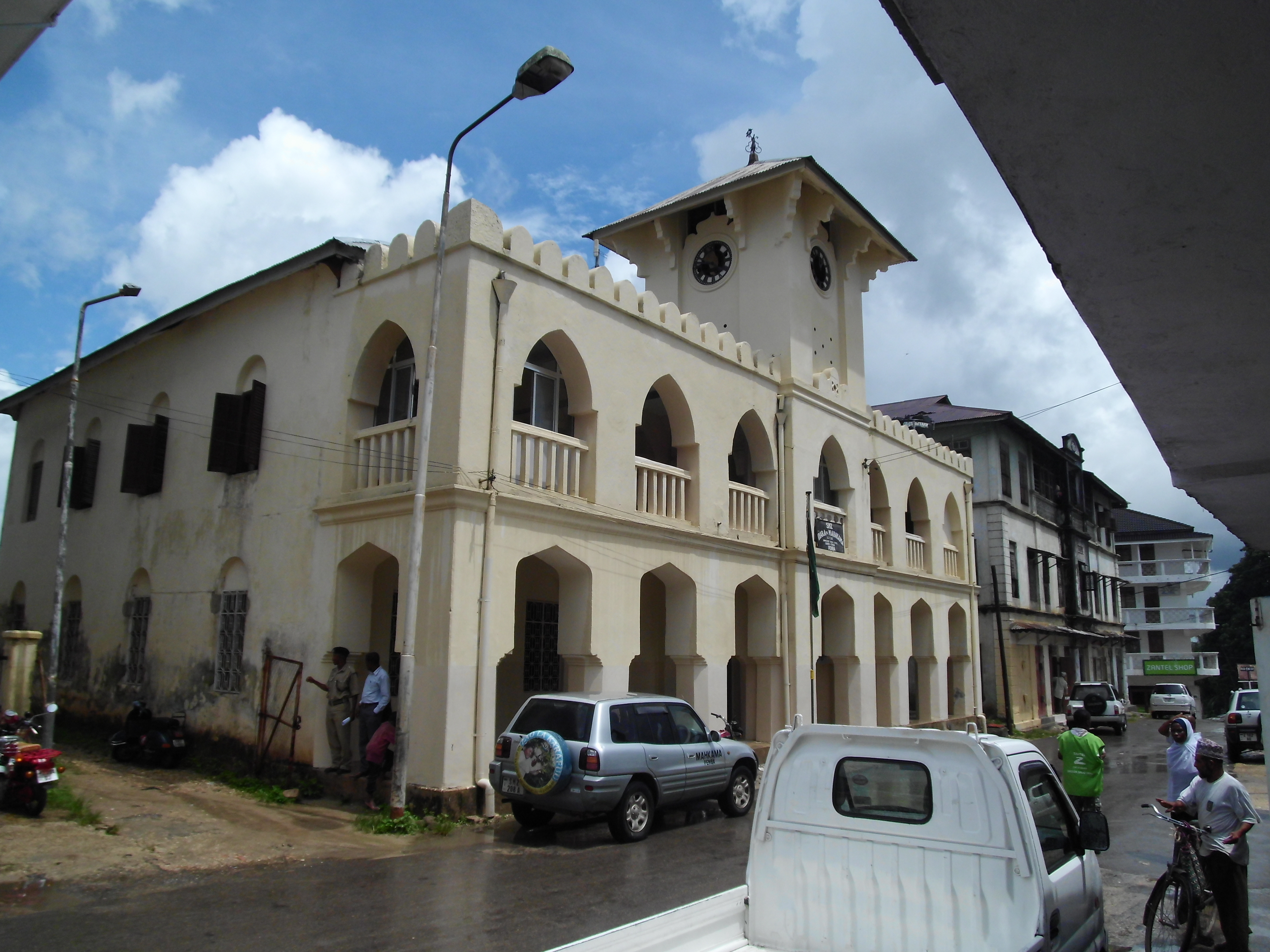
Pemba's courthouse in Chake Chake

Pemba is under the authority of the Revolutionary Government of Zanzibar. Administratively, it is divided into two regions, North Pemba (Pemba Kaskazini) with its capital at Wete, and South Pemba (Pemba Kusini) with its capital at Mkoani. The centrally located city of Chake Chake, near the airport, is considered Pemba's capital, and is the seat of Pemba's court and the President of Zanzibar's official Pemba residence.

== Economy ==
=== Fishing ===
Pemba is also famous for its rich fishing grounds. Between the island and the mainland there is the deep 50 kilometre wide Pemba Channel, which is one of the most profitable fishing grounds for game fishing on the Swahili Coast.

=== Farming and agriculture ===
Pemba is (with the exception of a strip of land along its eastern coast) highly fertile for agriculture which serves the global farming industry.

==== Cash crops ====
A large segment of Zanzibar export earnings comes from cloves. The greatest concentration of clove trees in Zanzibar is found on Pemba (3.5 million trees), as growing conditions on the island are superior to those on Unguja island. Clove trees grow to a height of approximately 10 to 15 metres and can be harvested for sometimes over 50 years. Most of the island, which is hillier and more fertile than Unguja, is dominated by small scale farming. There is also large-scale farming of other crops, primarily rice, coconuts, and red beans (called maharagwe in Swahili), as well as cassava and bananas.

=== Land surveying ===
For the promotion of tourism, the Department of Surveys and Mapping at Chake-Chake has been publishing maps with tourist guides since 1992.

== Transport ==
=== Airport ===
Pemba Airport is also known as Wawi Airport or Karume Airport and connects the island to Arusha, Dar es Salaam, and Zanzibar City.

== Gallery ==
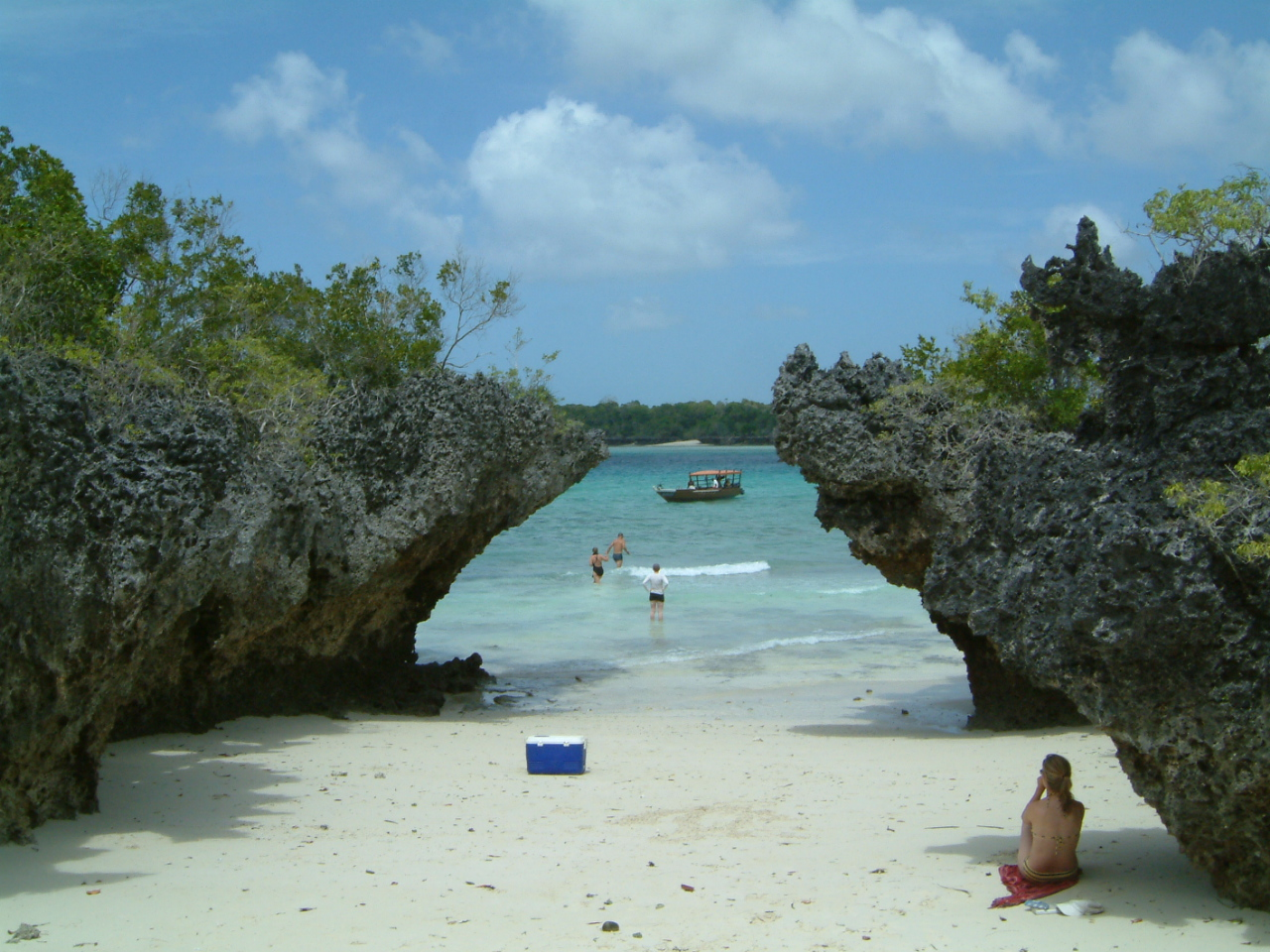
Island near Chake Chake

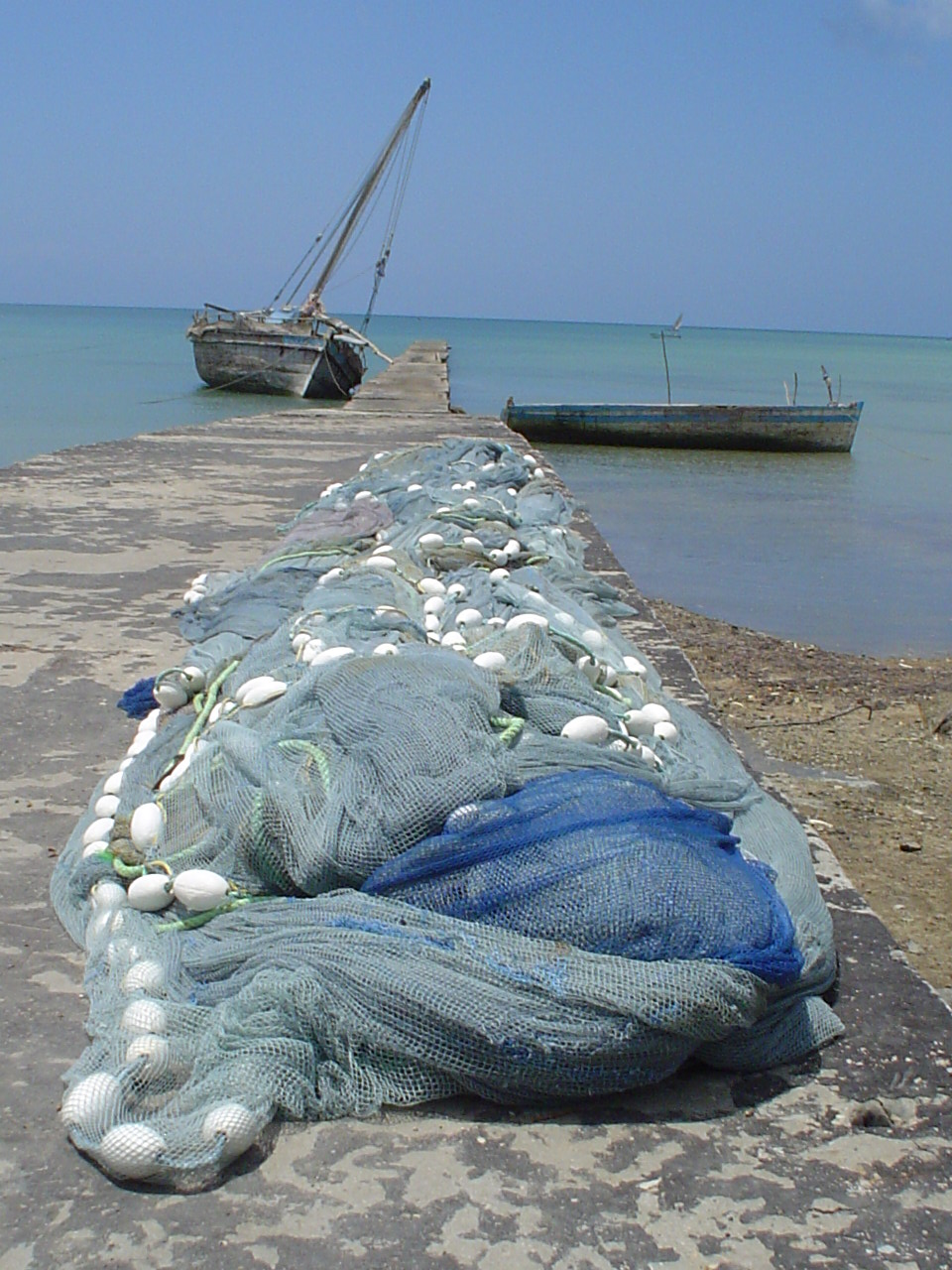
A wharf at Mkoani during the daytime with fishing nets being dried in the sun

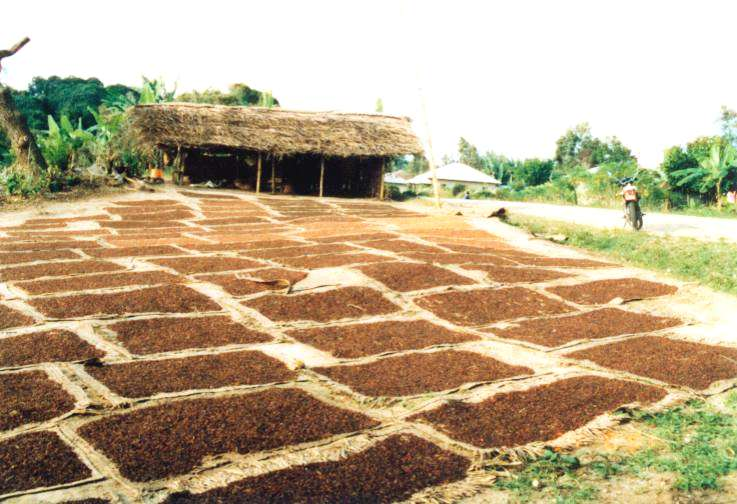
An example of clove buds being dried in the equatorial sun

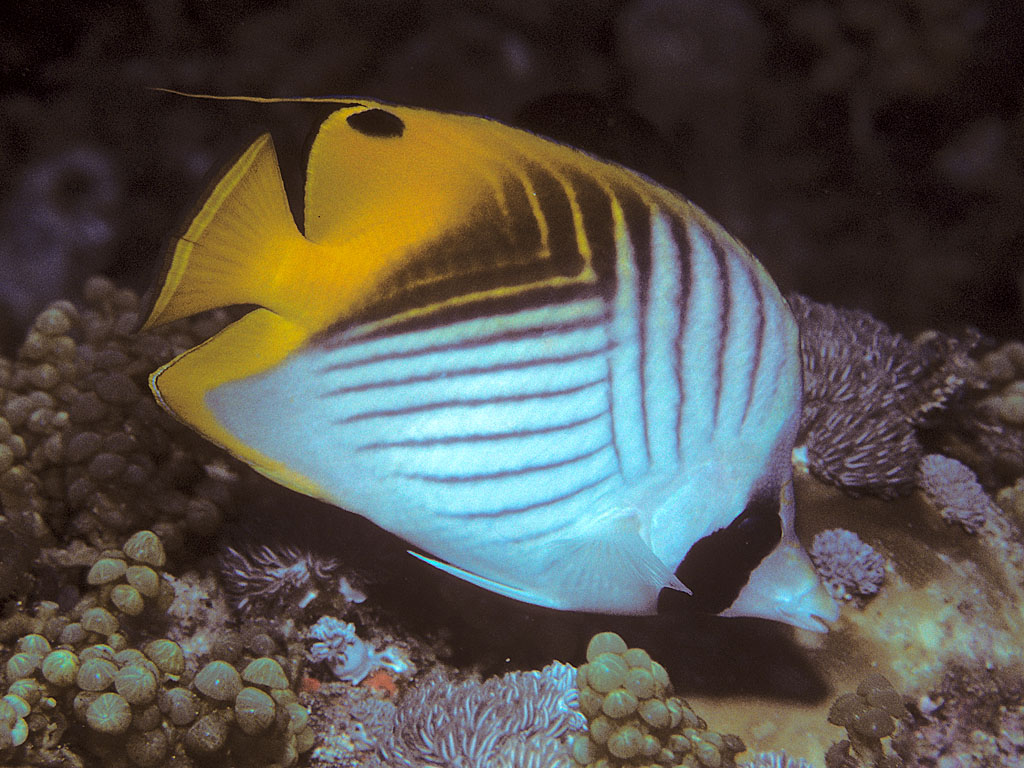
Threadfin butterflyfish (Chaetodon auriga). Underwater photograph at Pemba island

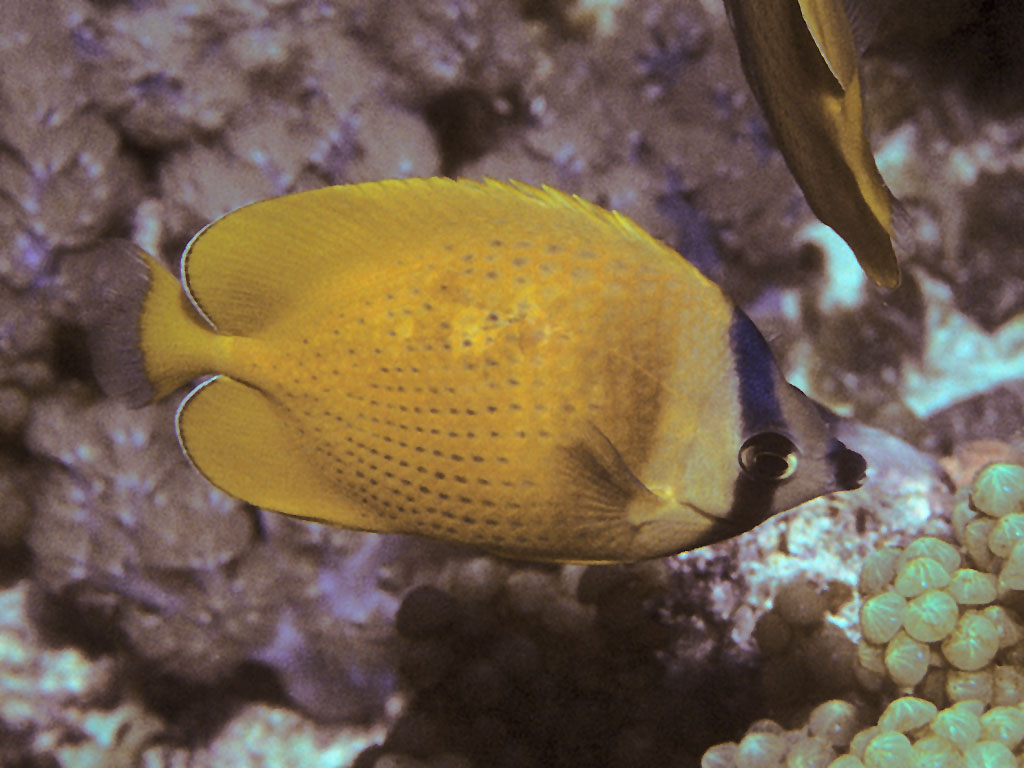
Sunburst butterflyfish (Chaetodon kleinii)

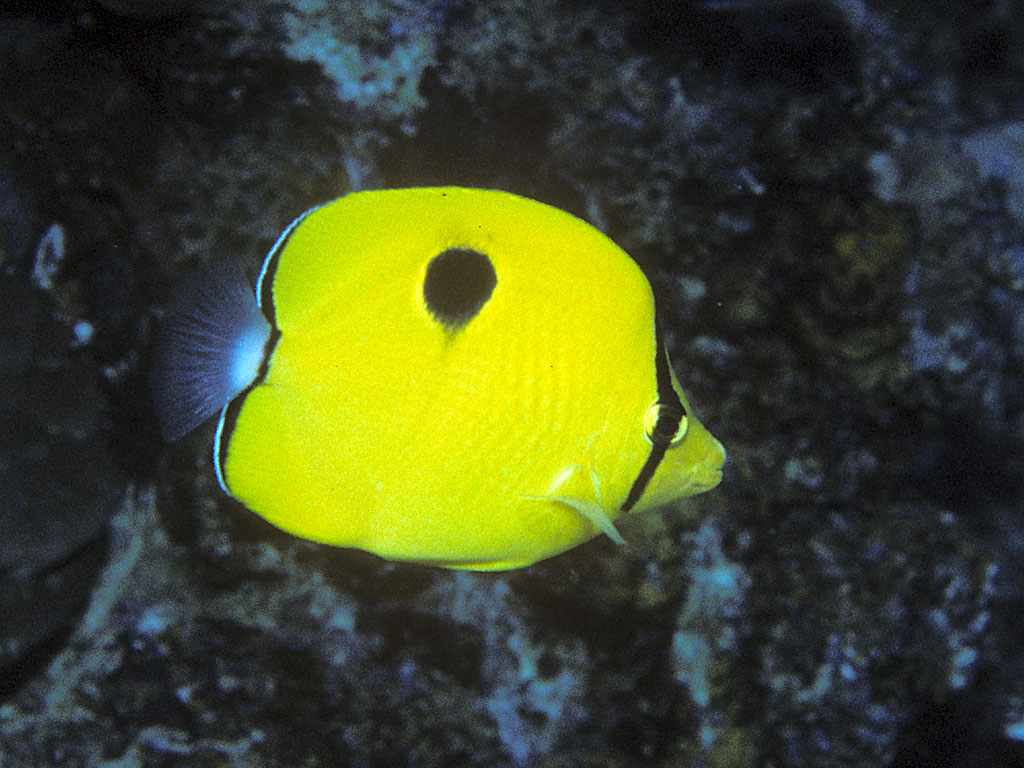
Yellow teardrop butterflyfish (Chaetodon interruptus)

== See also ==
- Geography of Tanzania
- Ghurabiyya Shia
