= Mtambwe Mkuu =

National Historic Site of Tanzania

- Location within Tanzania
- 4°57′43.164″S 39°46′39.324″E
- Type: Settlement
- Cultures: Swahili
- Location: Wete District, North Pemba Region, Tanzania

History
- Built: 13th century CE

Site notes
- Material: Coral rag
- Architectural styles: Swahili & Islamic
- Condition: Endangered
- Owner: Tanzanian Government
- Management: Antiquities Division, Ministry of Natural Resources and Tourism

National Historic Sites of Tanzania
- Official name: Mtambwe Kuu Historic Site
- Type: Cultural

Mtambwe Kuu or Mtambwe Mkuu (Magofu ya mji wa kale wa Mtambwe Mkuu in Swahili ) is a Medieval Swahili historic site located in Wete District of Pemba North Region. A town wall, a mosque, tombs, and residences are among the several stone constructions at the Mtambwe Mkuu site in northwest Pemba. The oldest indications of occupation date from the eleventh century and persisted successfully and unbrokenly until the fifteenth century. It was once again occupied in the nineteenth century. A cache of over 2,000 gold and silver coins from the 10 and eleventh centuries were found during an excavation at the location, demonstrating Pemba's Swahili involvement in the regional trade networks at the time.

Locals who had previously discovered coins nearby gave the archaeological team directions to the location where the coins were discovered. The treasure trove of coins was discovered beneath a hut's floor. Six hundred fifty-eight coins were discovered in the excavation, compared to about 800 coins discovered at the surface.

Eight of the coins discovered were made of gold. The hoard's estimated date was established by these coins as 1066 AD. With the exception of one, all of the gold coins were either originals from the Fatimid Caliphate or exact replicas of those pieces. A dinar from the Abbasid Caliphate was the other gold coin. To show Pemba's economic ties to the region, the coins were struck in cities all around the Mediterranean in the contemporary nations of Egypt, Tunisia, Syria, and Lebanon.

Silver was present in 650 of the coins that were discovered. Each coin had a name on one side and a spiritual maxim on the other. The coins from the Kilwa, an island off the coast of Kilwa District of Lindi Region in Tanzania, have a design resembling this one. The names of the rulers on the coins match those in the "Kilwa Chronicle" as well. The two economies are connected by these parallels and the discovery of coins from the Mtambwe series that are similar in Kilwa.

== See also ==
- Historic Swahili Settlements
- Archaeology of Pemba Island
