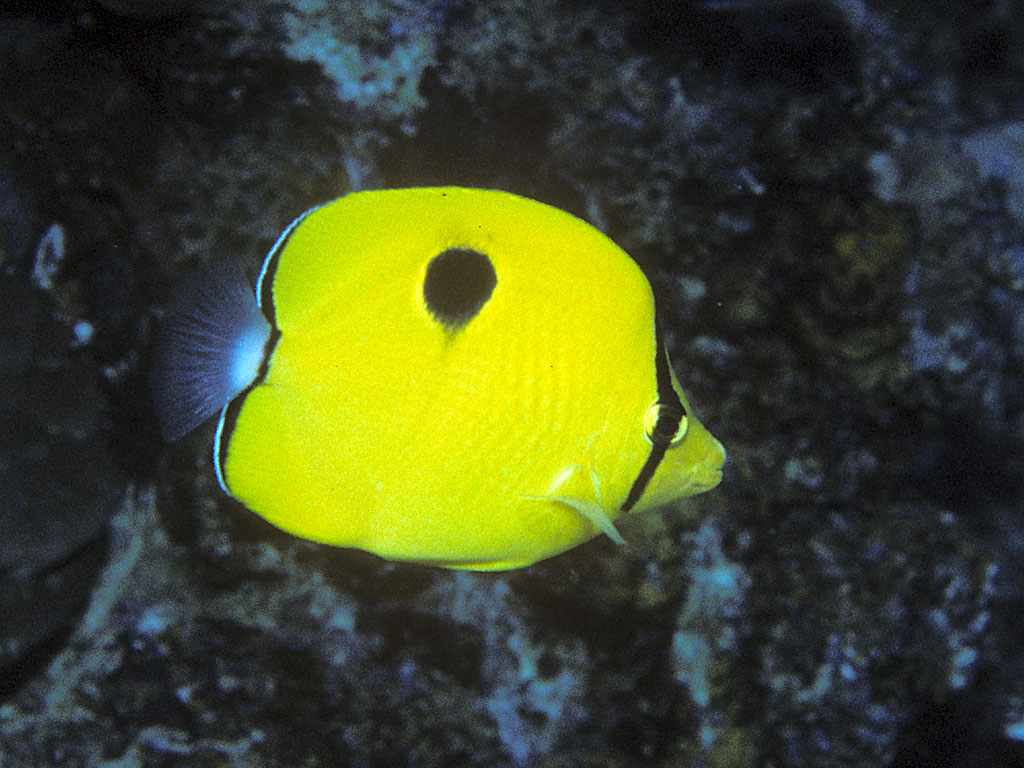

Conservation status
- Least Concern (IUCN 3.1)

Scientific classification
- Kingdom: Animalia
- Phylum: Chordata
- Class: Actinopterygii
- Division: Teleostei
- Order: Acanthuriformes
- Family: Chaetodontidae
- Genus: Chaetodon
- Subgenus: Lepidochaetodon
- Species: C. interruptus

Binomial name
- Chaetodon interruptus C. G. E. Ahl, 1923

Synonyms
- Chaetodon unimaculatus interruptus Ahl, 1923

= Yellow teardrop butterflyfish =

Species of fish

The yellow teardrop butterflyfish (Chaetodon interruptus), also known as the Indian teardrop butterflyfish, is a species of marine ray-finned fish, a butterflyfish of the family Chaetodontidae. It is found in the Indian Ocean from East Africa (south to Port Alfred, South Africa), to Sumatra, Indonesia.

== Description ==
The yellow teardrop butterflyfish has a bright yellow body which is disc shaped and laterally compressed. There is a large black spot on the upper flank and a black vertical bar through the eye and another black vertical bar at the rear margin which runs from the posterior of the soft rayed part of the dorsal fin to the anal fin. The tail is white and the tail fin is transparent. It has paler chevron markings which run vertically down the flanks. In the smaller juvenile fish there is a white ring around the blotch on the flanks, this is rounder and less teardrop shaped than in adults, the black also being tinted with blue. As they grow the white outer ring turns yellow and the mark develops a teardrop shape. This species has 12–13 spines in its dorsal fin and 21–23 soft rays while the anal fin has 3 spines and 18–20 soft rays. This species attains a maximum total length of 20 centimetres (7.9 in).

== Distribution ==
The yellow teardrop butterflyfish is found in the Indian Ocean where it occurs along the coast of East Africa from Somalia and Socotra south to South Africa east to the coast of Sumatra and western Thailand, including most of the Indian Ocean islands and southern India.

== Habitat and biology ==
The yellow teardrop butterflyfish inhabits habitats varying from coral reef flats to deep slopes. The adults are normally encountered in pairs although they will occasionally forage in small schools. It is an oviparous species in which the males and females form pairs to breed. They are omnivores and have a varied diet which includes hard and soft coral fragments, sponges, polychaetes, and filamentous algae.

== Taxonomy ==
The yellow teardrop butterflyfish was first formally described from Mauritius in 1923 by the German zoologist Ernst Ahl (1898–1945) as the subspecies interruptus of the Indo-Pacific teardrop butterflyfish (Chaetodon unimaculatus) and it is still considered to be so by some authorities.

== Utilisation ==
The yellow teardrop butterflyfish is infrequently found in the aquarium trade. It is considered to be of medium difficulty for keeping within this hobby.
