= Mkoani =

Capital of Pemba South region, Tanzania

Coordinates: 5°22′S 39°39′E

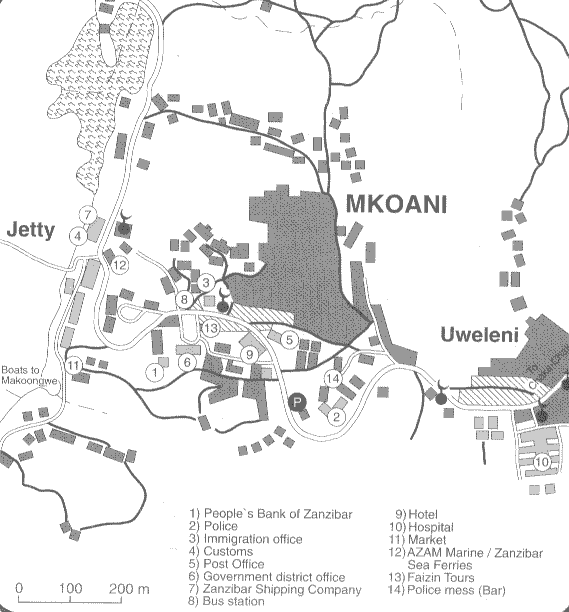
City map of Mkoani (Pemba)

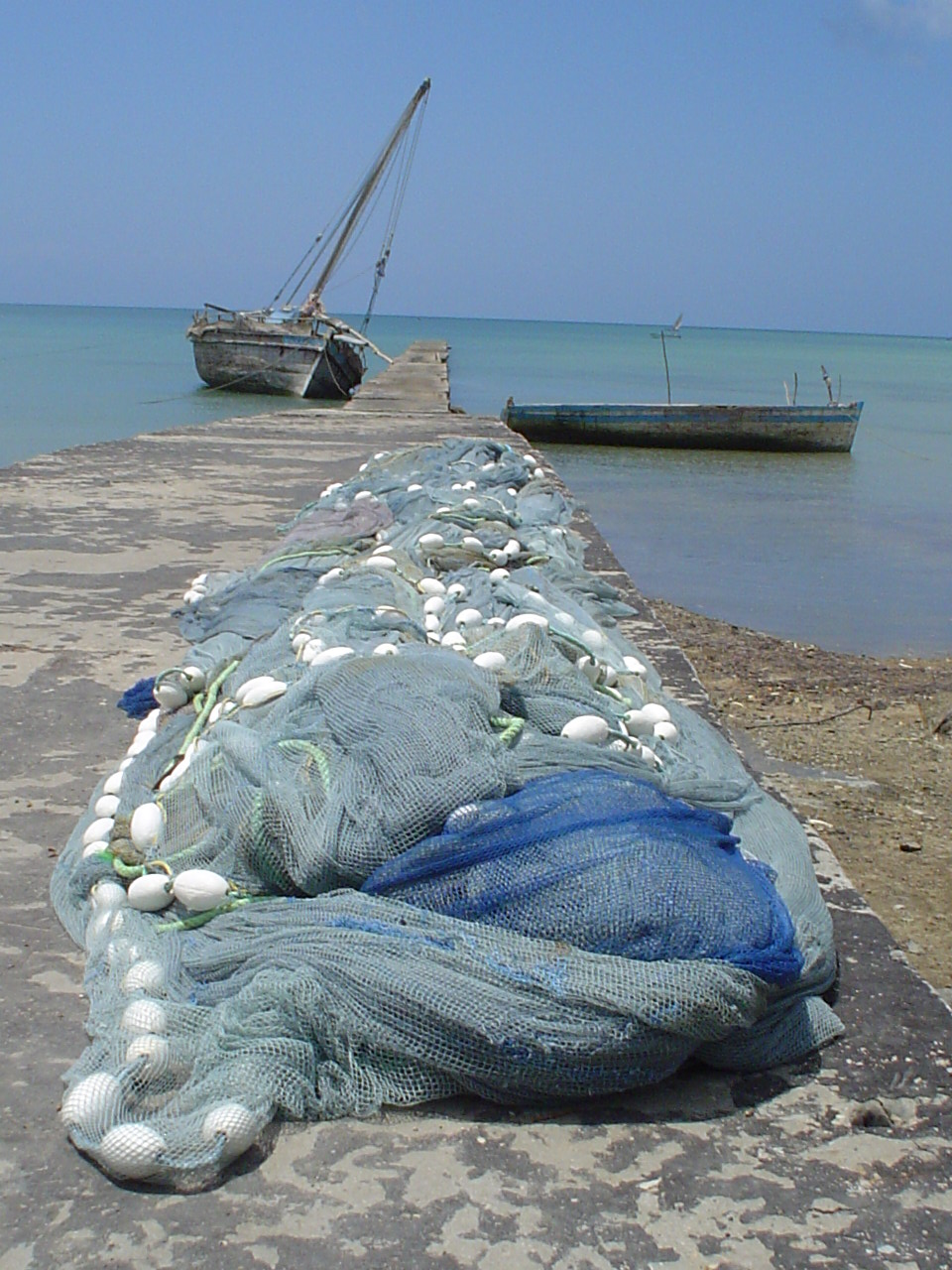
Mkoani wharf

Mkoani is a town located on the Tanzanian island of Pemba. It is the capital of Pemba South region, as well as Mkoani District. Currently, Mkoani has the busiest harbour on Pemba island, most ferries from Zanzibar or the mainland arrive at Mkoani. The town has a population of 23,719 (2022 census)

The Abdulla Mzee hospital is located in Mkoani.

== Climate ==
Mkoani has a tropical climate, milder than Tanzania's mainland and milder than in Unguja island. This climate is classified as "Am" by the Köppen-Geiger system. The average temperature in Mkoani is 26 °C (79 °F). The average annual rainfall is 1,924 mm. The monthly average temperatures are usually between 24 and 28 °C (75 and 82 °F). There are two rain seasons, with most rainfall coming between March and June and shorter rain season coming between November and December. Drier months are January–February, and a longer drier season between July and October.

Climate data for Mkoani
Month	Jan	Feb	Mar	Apr	May	Jun	Jul	Aug	Sep	Oct	Nov	Dec	Year
Mean daily maximum °C (°F)	31.5 (88.7)	32.1 (89.8)	32.5 (90.5)	30.5 (86.9)	29.3 (84.7)	28.9 (84.0)	28.2 (82.8)	28.4 (83.1)	29.1 (84.4)	30.1 (86.2)	30.7 (87.3)	31.3 (88.3)	30.2 (86.4)
Daily mean °C (°F)	27.3 (81.1)	27.6 (81.7)	27.9 (82.2)	26.7 (80.1)	25.7 (78.3)	25.0 (77.0)	24.2 (75.6)	24.0 (75.2)	24.4 (75.9)	25.4 (77.7)	26.3 (79.3)	27.0 (80.6)	26 (79)
Mean daily minimum °C (°F)	23.2 (73.8)	23.1 (73.6)	23.3 (73.9)	23.0 (73.4)	22.2 (72.0)	21.1 (70.0)	20.2 (68.4)	19.7 (67.5)	19.8 (67.6)	20.7 (69.3)	21.9 (71.4)	22.8 (73.0)	21.8 (71.2)
Average precipitation mm (inches)	75 (3.0)	55 (2.2)	178 (7.0)	501 (19.7)	472 (18.6)	119 (4.7)	66 (2.6)	42 (1.7)	34 (1.3)	63 (2.5)	160 (6.3)	159 (6.3)	1,924 (75.7)
Source: Climate-Data.ORG

== Notes ==
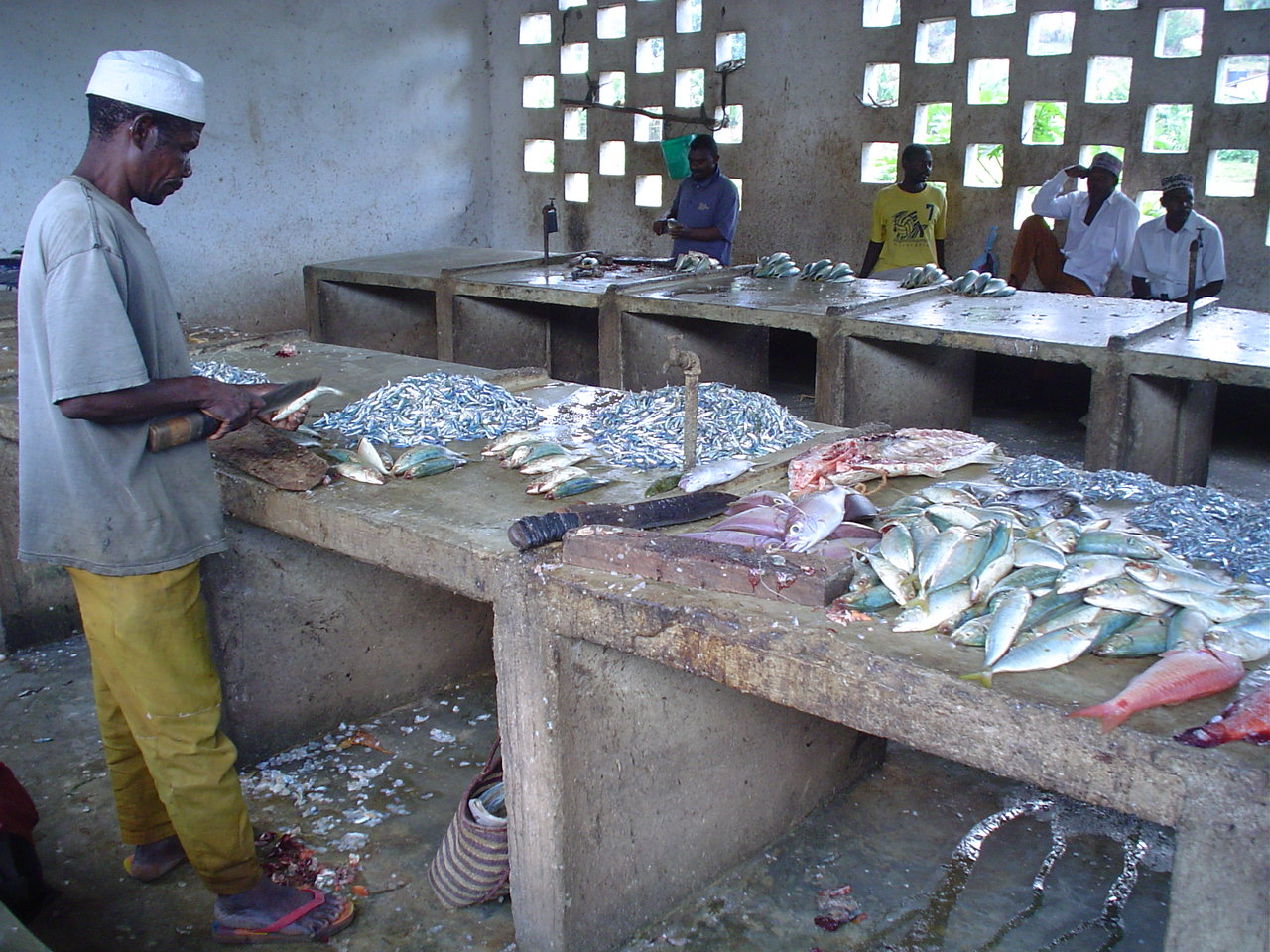
Mkoani fish market
