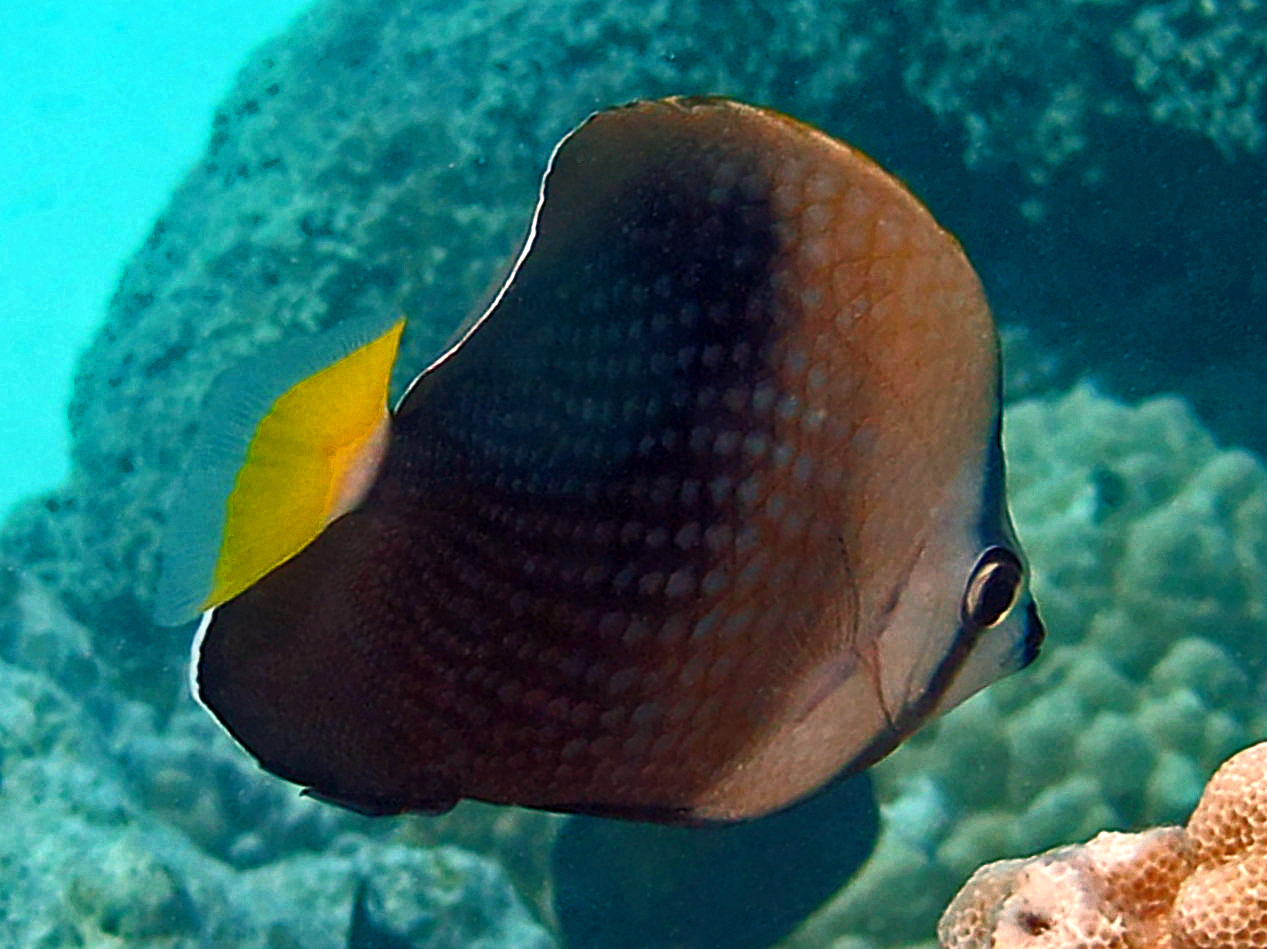
- Chaetodon trichrous from Tuamotu Archipelago

Conservation status
- Least Concern (IUCN 3.1)

Scientific classification
- Kingdom: Animalia
- Phylum: Chordata
- Class: Actinopterygii
- Order: Acanthuriformes
- Family: Chaetodontidae
- Genus: Chaetodon
- Subgenus: Lepidochaetodon
- Species: C. trichrous

Binomial name
- Chaetodon trichrous Günther, 1874

= Chaetodon trichrous =

Species of fish

Chaetodon trichrous (Tahiti butterflyfish) is a species of fish in the family Chaetodontidae.

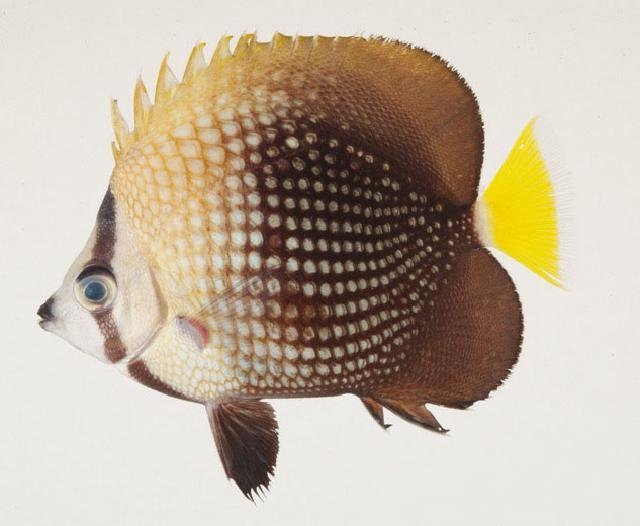
Illustration of Chaetodon trichrous

== Taxonomy ==
This species is included in the subgenus Lepidochaetodon. In 1984, André and Roland Bauchot Maugé proposed to include this species in a new genus Mesochaetodon.

== Description ==
Chaetodon trichrous can grow to a length of about 12 centimetres (4.7 in). The back half of the body is dark brown to black, while the front part is grayish, with a small vertical black stripe through the eye. The tail is yellow.

== Biology ==
These fishes feed over hard substrate and on plankton. They usually live singly, in pairs or in small groups.

== Distribution ==
This species is endemic to French Polynesia (Marquesas Islands, Society Islands, Tahiti, Tuamotu Archipelago) in the central-south Pacific Ocean.

== Habitat ==
Chaetodon trichrous prefers shallow coastal habitats, lagoon reefs and rocky reefs, at depths between 3 and 25 meters.
