= Ras Mkumbuu Ruins =

National Historic Site of Tanzania

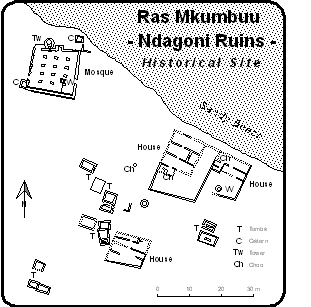
- Ndagoni complex part of the Ras Mkumbuu Ruins

- Location within Tanzania
- 5°11′43.8576″S 39°39′13.31″E
- Type: Settlement
- Cultures: Swahili
- Location: Chake Chake District, Pemba South Region, Tanzania

History
- Built: 9th century CE
- Abandoned: 16th century CE

Site notes
- Material: Coral rag
- Architectural styles: Swahili & Islamic
- Condition: Endangered
- Owner: Tanzanian Government
- Management: Antiquities Division, Ministry of Natural Resources and Tourism

National Historic Sites of Tanzania
- Official name: Ras Mkumbuu Ruins Historic Site
- Type: Cultural

The Ras Mkumbuu Ruins (Magofu ya mji wa kale wa Ras Mkumbuu in Swahili ) are an archaeological site located in Chake Chake district of the South Pemba Region of Tanzania. They lie close to the village of Ndagoni at the end of a long narrow peninsula known as Ras Mkumbuu, which lies to the northwest of the town of Chake-Chake.

The ruins mainly date from the 9th century CE and were abandoned in the 16th century, though there are indications that they were built over older foundations. Notable among these ruins are those of a large mosque which was for some time the largest structure of its type in sub-Saharan Africa.

The site was first excavated in the 1950s by archaeologist James Kirkman. Kirkman proposed to connect his findings with the "Qanbalu" mentioned by the Arab explorer Al-Masudi around 900 CE but could not identify remnants earlier than the 13th century . A possible identification of Pemba Island as a whole and especially Ras Mkumbuu with Qanbalu is still discussed.

== See also ==
- Historic Swahili Settlements
