= Micheweni District =

District of Pemba North Region, Tanzania

Micheweni
- District
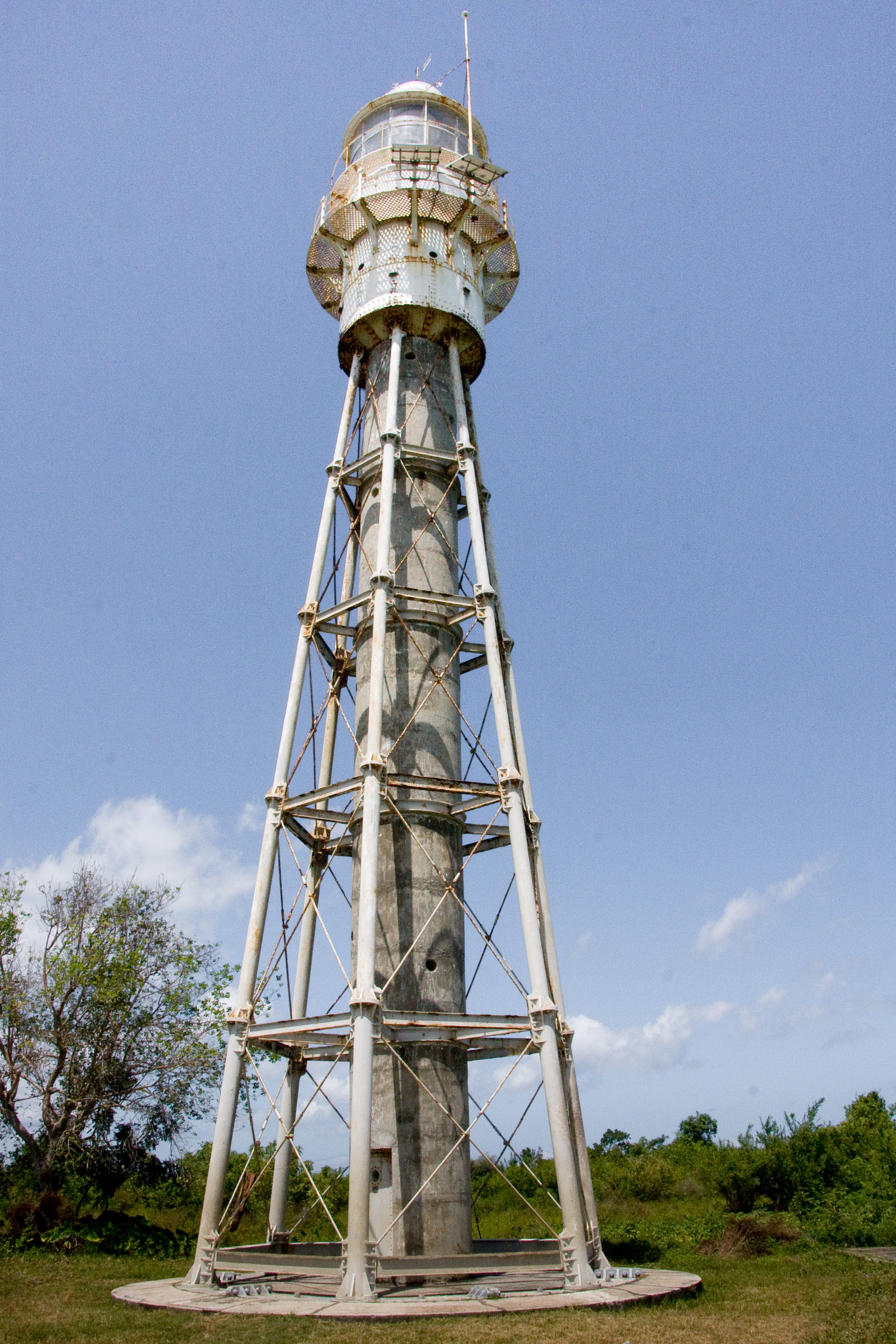
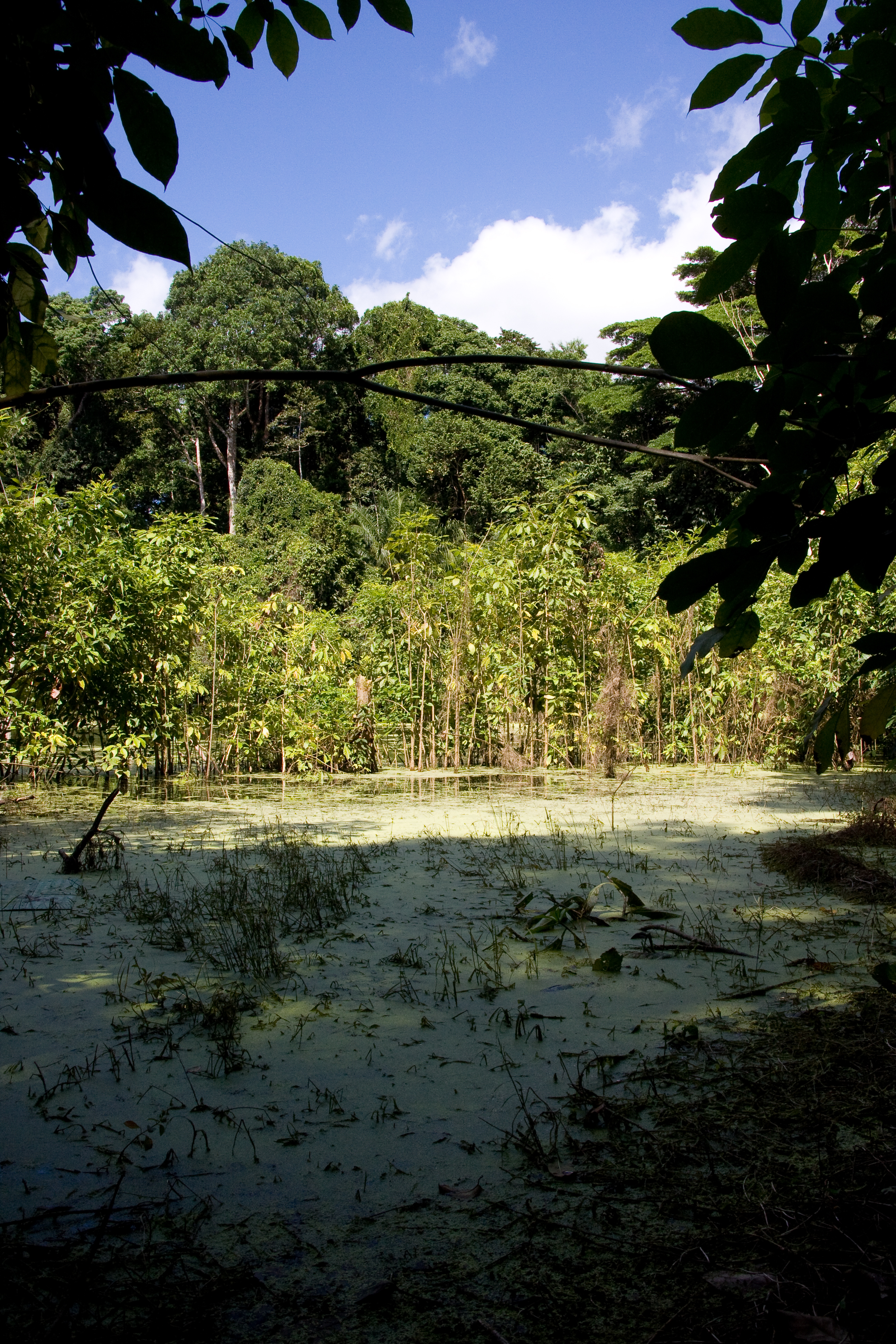
- From top to bottom: Kigomasha lighthouse & Ngezi Forest in northeast Micheweni District
- Nickname: Wild Pemba
- Location in Pemba North
- Coordinates: 4°59′2.4″S 39°45′18″E
- Country: Tanzania
- Region: Pemba South Region
- Capital: Konde

Area
  - Total: 231 km^{2} (89 sq mi)
  - Rank: 2nd in Pemba North

Population (2022)
  - Total: 123,379
  - Rank: 2nd in Pemba North
  - Density: 534/km^{2} (1,380/sq mi)
- Demonym: Michewenian

Ethnic groups
  - Settler: Swahili
  - Native: Hadimu

Micheweni District (Wilaya ya Micheweni in Swahili) is one of two administrative districts of Pemba North Region in Tanzania. The district covers an area of 231.1 km^{2} (89.2 sq mi). The district is comparable in size to the land area of Cook Islands. The district has a water border to the east, north and west by the Indian Ocean. The district is bordered to the south by Wete District. The district seat (capital) is the town of Konde. According to the 2022 census, the district has a total population of 123,379.

== Administrative subdivisions ==
=== Constituencies ===
For parliamentary elections, Tanzania is divided into constituencies. As of the 2010 elections Micheweni District had four constituencies:

- Konde Constituency
- Mgogoni Constituency
- Micheweni Constituency
- Tumbe Constituency

=== Wards ===
Micheweni District is administratively divided into ten wards:

1. Kinowe
2. Kiuyu Maziwa Ng'ombe
3. Konde
4. Mgogoni
5. Micheweni

1. Msuka
2. Shumba Viamboni
3. Tumbe
4. Wingwi Mapofu
5. Wingwi Njuguni

== Education ==
In the 2002 census literacy in Micheweni District stood at 40 percent for those aged 5 years and above. Literacy in Swahili was 30 percent, while 19 percent were literate in English, with 9 percent overlap.
