= Sack of Kilwa =

Portuguese Military Campaign

- Part of the Portuguese battles in the East
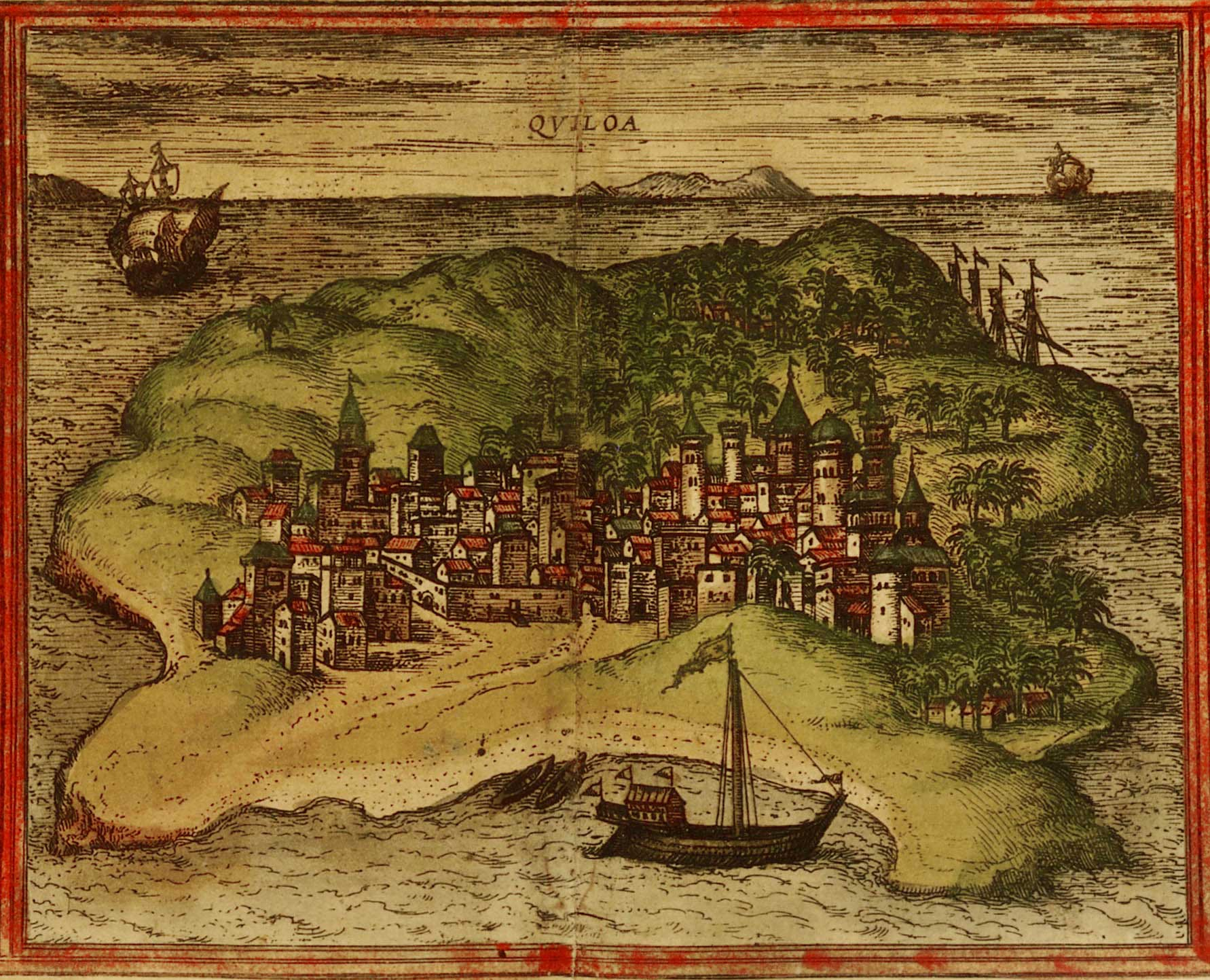
- Kilwa Kisiwani, on the Tanzanian coast. From Civitates orbis terrarum vol. I, by Georg Braun and Franz Hogenberg, 1572
Date	24 July 1505
Location	Kilwa Kisiwani, present-day Tanzania
Result	Portuguese victory

Belligerents
Portuguese Empire	Kilwa Sultanate

Commanders and leaders
(Portuguese Empire) Dom Francisco de Almeida (Portuguese Empire) Dom Lourenço de Almeida	Sultan Ibrahim

Strength
Around 500 men	Unknown

The Sack of Kilwa (Portuguese: Saque de Quiloa) was a military campaign carried out by the Portuguese on 24 July 1505, led by Dom Francisco de Almeida, against the city-state of the Kilwa Sultanate. The operation resulted in a decisive Portuguese victory and the sacking of Kilwa, a prominent trading hub along the Swahili Coast.

After sacking Kilwa, the Portuguese built Fort Santiago in the city before proceeding to attack Mombasa. However, they lost Kilwa to Arab mercenaries in 1512. The Portuguese ultimately regained permanent control of Kilwa in 1597.

== Background ==
Kilwa was first encountered by the Portuguese expedition led by Pedro Álvares Cabral in 1500, shortly after Vasco da Gama's voyage to India. At that time, Kilwa had around 4,000 inhabitants, but its economy was in decline. Kilwa, an Islamic sultanate, was not welcoming to the Portuguese, and the local elites were particularly resistant. In 1502, Vasco da Gama reduced Kilwa to a tributary vassal of Portugal, but the city later ceased making payments. In 1505, King Manuel I appointed Dom Francisco de Almeida as the first Viceroy of India, tasked with building a fort in Kilwa. This fort was intended to serve as a vital stop for Portuguese fleets traveling between Europe and Asia via the Cape Route, as well as to protect Portuguese merchants in the city.

== The sack ==
On July 19, the Portuguese sighted the land of South Africa between Sofala and Mozambique, and, continuing on, anchored off the bar of Kilwa on July 22. Two days later, on the eve of St. James's Day, July 24, the entire fleet, consisting of eight ships, gathered. Dom Francisco, having assembled his troops aboard the flagship, where a priest led a general confession and granted absolution, entrusted a nobleman by the name of Pedro Cam who served as an Ensign with the Cross of Christ standard as the soldiers prepared to land.

Portuguese naval and war banner featuring the Cross of the Order of Christ, used in the 16th and 17th centuries.

Once ashore, the 500 troops were split into two groups. Dom Francisco led 300 men, while his son, Dom Lourenço, took command of 200, tasked with advancing along the shore to the king's palace. Dom Lourenço was to fire a gun as a signal, prompting his father to attack the town's center. At sunrise, Dom Lourenço gave the signal, and Dom Francisco's forces charged forward, shouting the war cry of Santiago. Despite the noise of trumpets and shouts, the Moors had yet to appear.

As Dom Francisco's forces advanced through the narrow streets of the town, they were met with heavy resistance. Defenders attacked from rooftops, throwing stones and shooting arrows, forcing the Portuguese soldiers to fight their way into the buildings to counter the ambush. Using interconnected rooftops, the troops eventually cleared a path to the king's palace, where a fierce battle broke out. Though outnumbered, the Portuguese forced the defenders to retreat into the fortress.

A feigned surrender temporarily halted the fighting, allowing the king and his retinue to escape through a hidden door into a grove of palm trees. Dom Francisco chose not to pursue, deeming the terrain too risky. Instead, he allowed his men to sack the town, ensuring the protection of an ally, Mohamed Ancony.

== Aftermath ==
After securing the town, Dom Francisco sent his son, Dom Lourenço, with a group of noblemen to maintain order and prevent excessive looting by the troops. Dom Lourenço encountered widespread chaos, as the soldiers were consumed by greed and difficult to restrain. After significant effort, he managed to restore order and bring the men back to Dom Francisco's position. Once calm was restored, Dom Francisco summoned João da Nova to escort Mohamed Ancony, a local ally, to meet him. Ancony informed Dom Francisco of the king's escape to the mainland and provided other valuable intelligence. After the meeting, Dom Francisco dismissed Ancony with orders for João da Nova to ensure his safe return home.

Dom Francisco then gathered his troops at the base of a tower, where priests had erected a cross to signify the triumph of their faith. Knighthood was bestowed upon several soldiers, honoring their bravery during the campaign. Although no Portuguese lives were lost, many were wounded in the fighting. The victory was later marked by a Mass and a sermon on St. James's Day, emphasizing gratitude and faith amid their success.

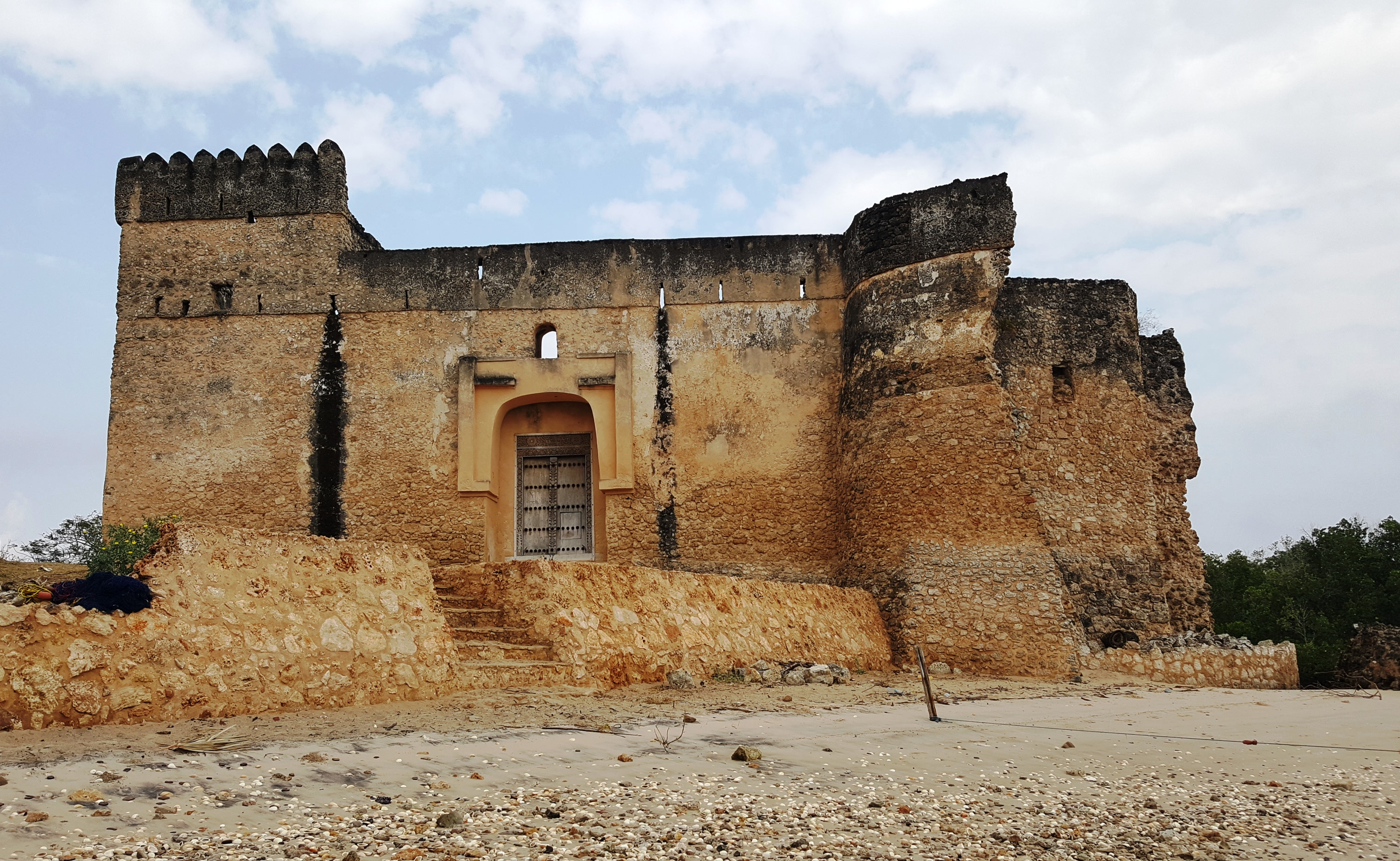
Fort Santiago in Kilwa

On July 25, the Portuguese constructed Fort Santiago, naming it in honor of the Saint's feast. Chief architect Tomás Fernandes, who was part of the fleet, likely designed the fort, while Fernão Gomes oversaw its construction.

The Portuguese, having disembarked, proceeded to attack Mombasa. In 1512, the Portuguese lost Fort Santiago to Arab mercenaries, before ultimately regaining permanent control in 1597.

== See also ==
- Battle of Mombasa (1505)
