= Fort Santiago (Kilwa) =

- Forte de Santiago
- Kilwa Kisiwani in Tanzania
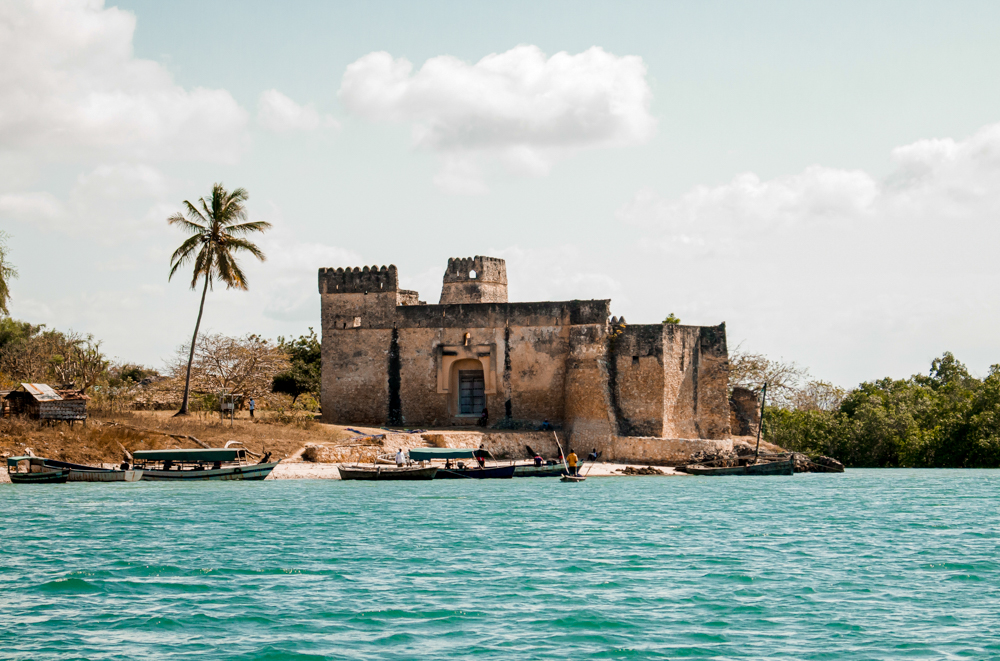
- Fort Santiago

Site information
- Type: Bastion fort
- Open to the public: Yes
- Condition: Ruined

Location
- Fort Santiago
- Coordinates: 8°57′28″S 39°29′59″E

Site history
- Built: 1505
- Built by: Dom Francisco de Almeida
- Fate: Abandoned

Fort Santiago is the name of a former Portuguese military installation in the island of Kilwa, in Tanzania. It's nowadays known as Arab Fort or Gereza Fort. It is situated between the Makutani Palace and the Great Mosque.

== History ==
Kilwa was first contacted by the Portuguese of the armada of Pedro Álvares Cabral in 1500, the second to sail to India after Vasco da Gama a few years prior. Kilwa had about 4000 inhabitants but its economic fortunes were on the decline. Like most polities on the east African coast, Kilwa was an Islamic sultanate and the Portuguese were poorly received by the local elites. In 1502, the Portuguese reduced Kilwa to the status of tributary vassal. In 1505, king Manuel I of Portugal appointed Dom Francisco de Almeida as first Viceroy of India, tasked with, among other things, building a fort in Kilwa, that was to serve as a stopping point for Portuguese fleets sailing between Europe and Asia through the Cape Route, and also ensure the safety of Portuguese merchants in the city.

Upon arriving in Kilwa, the local ruler emir Ibrahim, a minister who had recently murdered and usurped the throne from the rightful sultan al-Fudail refused to negotiate with the Portuguese, hence Dom Francisco had the island captured and the emir deposed, being replaced by Mohammed Arcone. Arcone was a pro-Portuguese noble but as he was not of royal blood, he accepted the position only temporarily, until al-Fudails son Micante could succeed on the throne. A few days afterwards, work begun on the fortress on the July 25th, day of Saint James, which saint the fort was named after. It was probably designed by the chief-architect Tomás Fernandes, who was present in the fleet. The head of construction was Fernão Gomes.

The fort was built over the old royal citadel. A number of houses contiguous to the fort were demolished to clear the line of sight for the artillery. A bastion was erected close to the sea, to ensure communications between the fort and Portuguese fleets. The fort had a square shape and featured four towers on the corners, embrasures close to the ground. It had 73 cannon.

The usefulness of Fort Santiago was cut short by the state of political intrigue and civil-war on Kilwa, not caused by the Portuguese but aggravated by the deposition of the ruling sultan. Trade faltered, and the Portuguese explorer António Fernandes who was sent to venture into the African interior found out that the profitable gold trade took place in fairs on the interior and not on the coastal cities. Fernandes' reports constitute the first European record of exploration of the interior of central Africa. The Island of Mozambique was also perceived as a more convenient harbour. By order of King Manuel, in 1512, the garrison was evacuated by a fleet commanded by Jorge de Melo Pereira and the fort abandoned. Kilwa remained a Portuguese vassal nominally.

The Omani Empire captured the fort in the 19th century. The present form of the fort typical of Omani forts. The word Gereza means "prison" in Swahili, possibly indicating the use of the fort as an Omani slave holding building during the late 18th century to late 19th century after the collapse of the Swahili civilization after the arrival of the Portuguese in late 16th century.

== Gallery ==
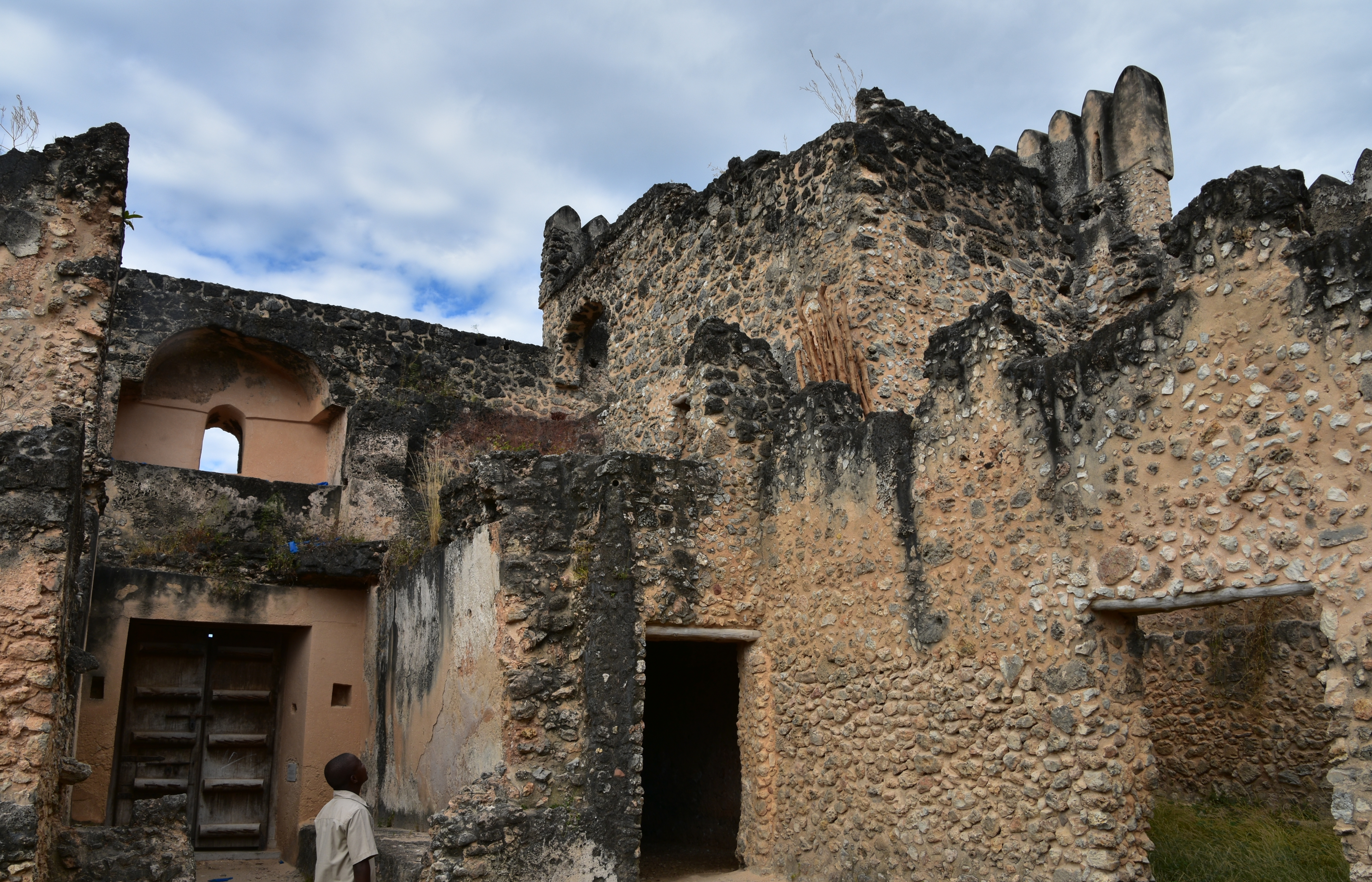

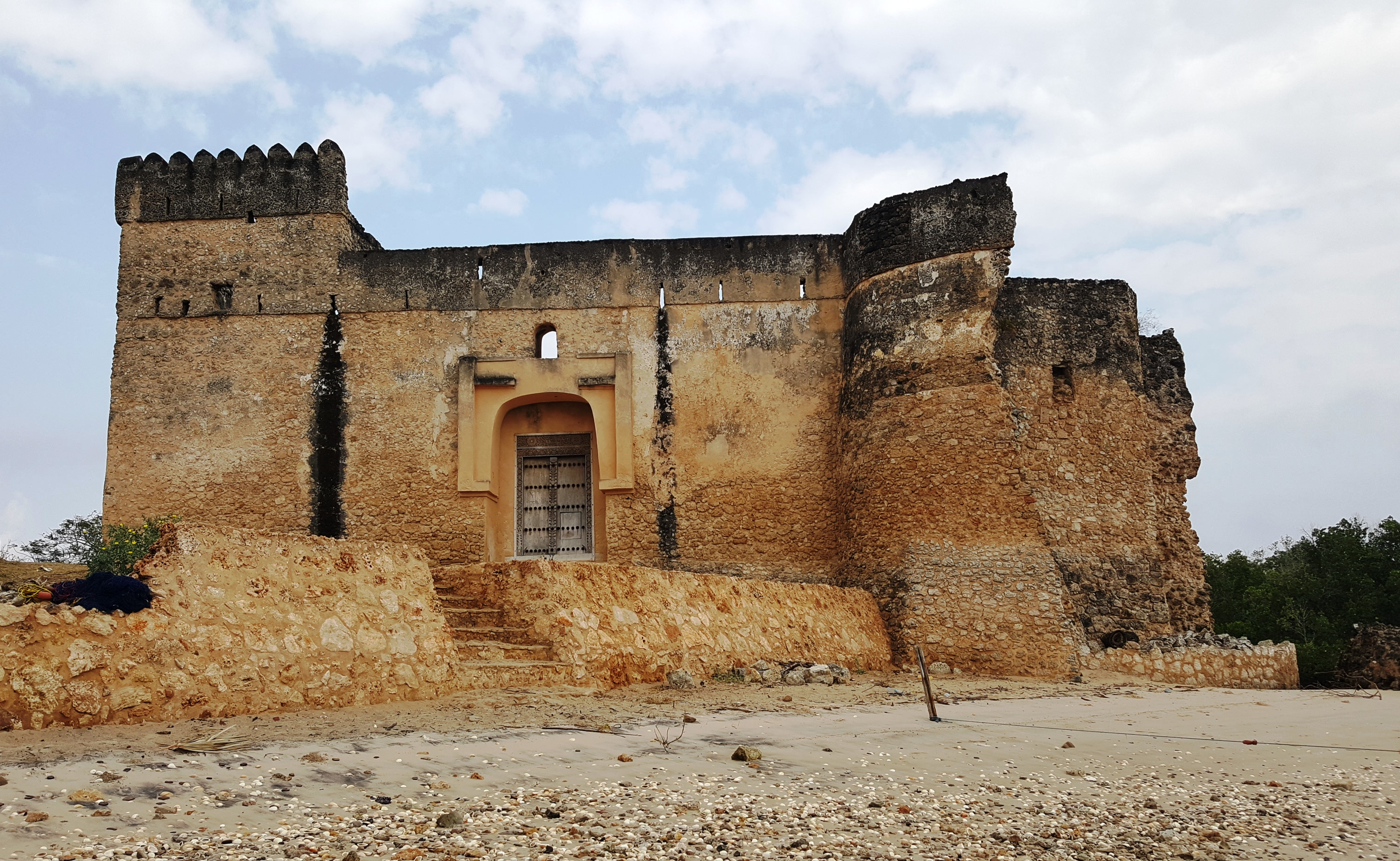

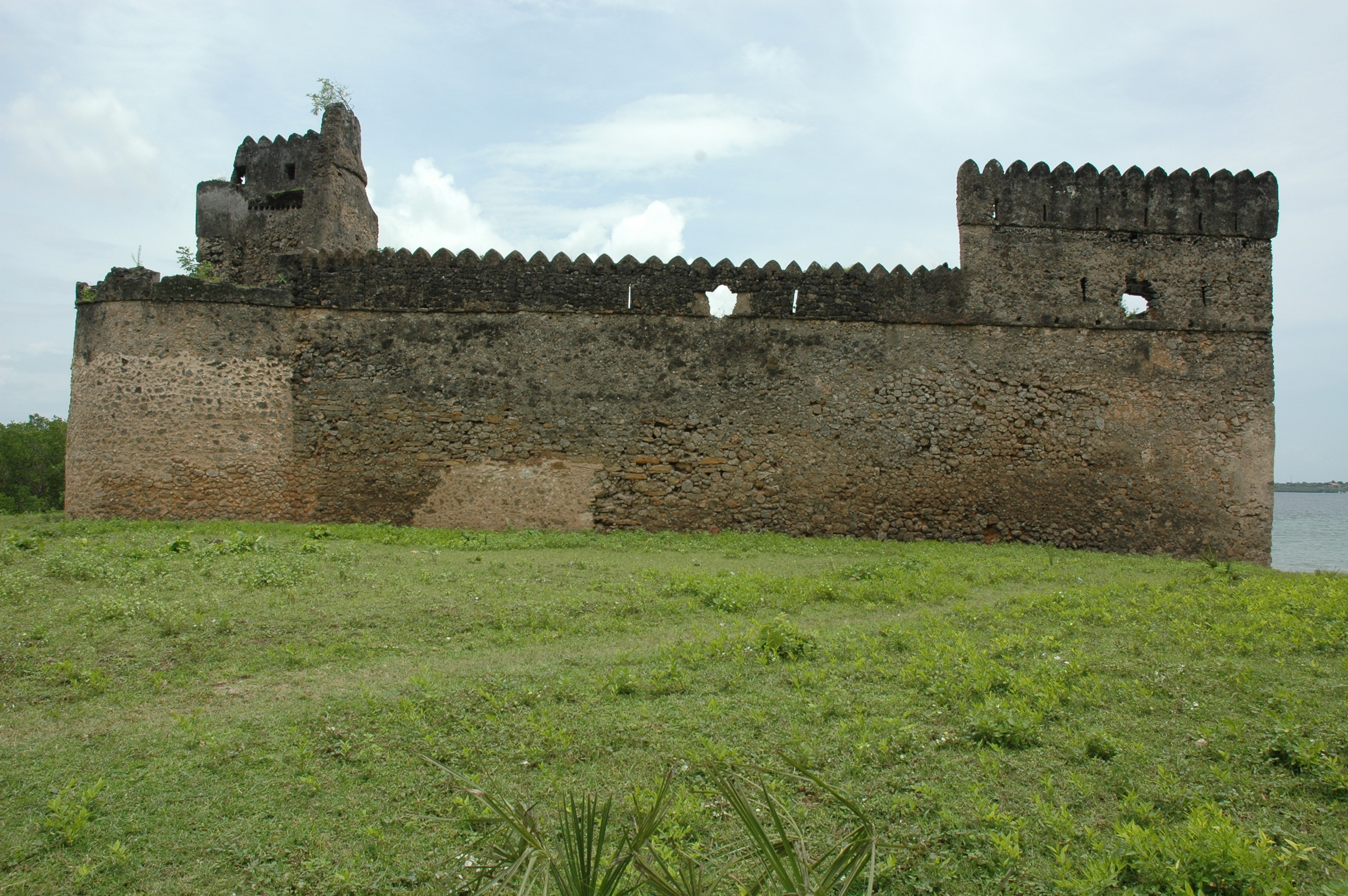

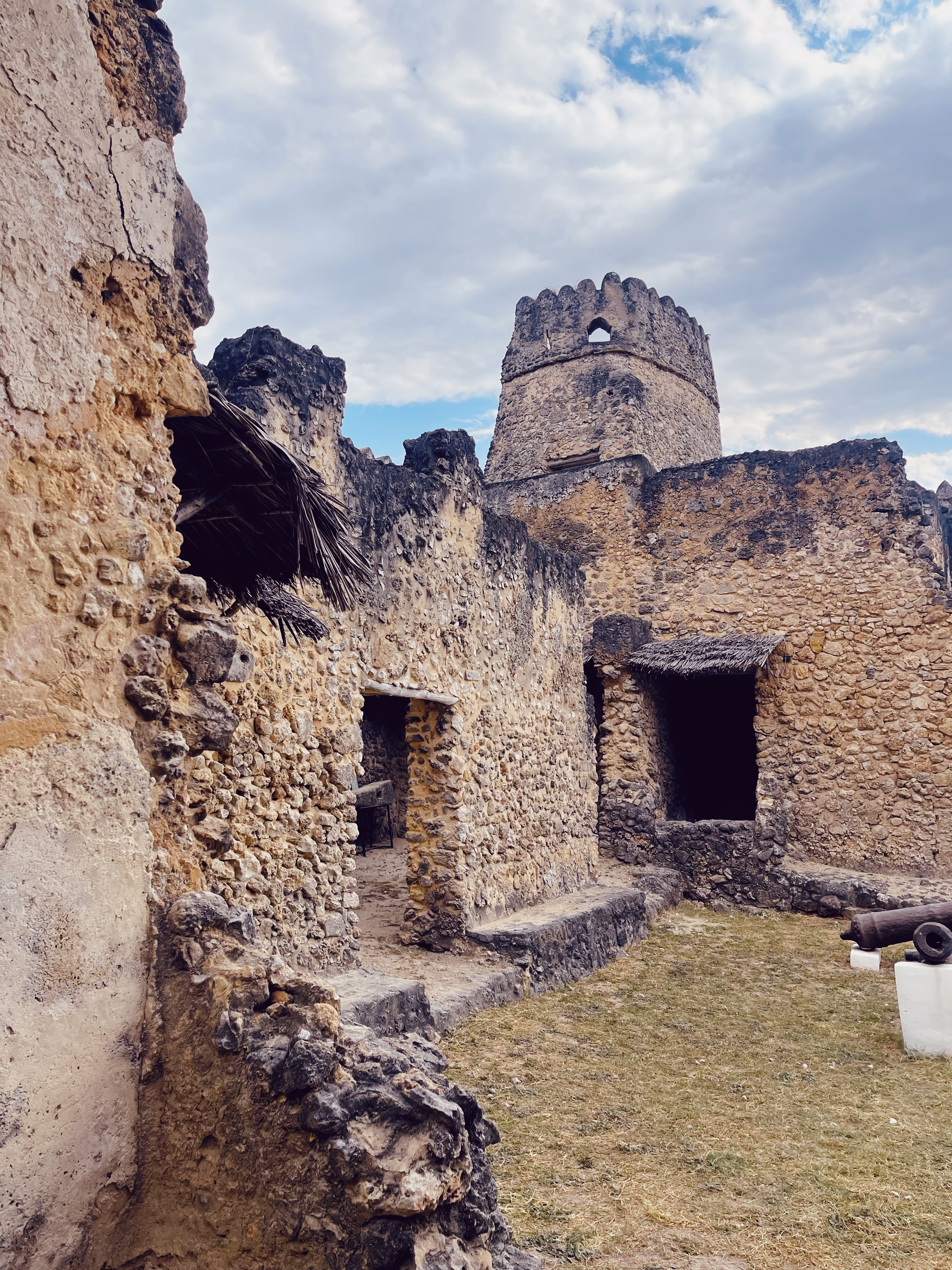

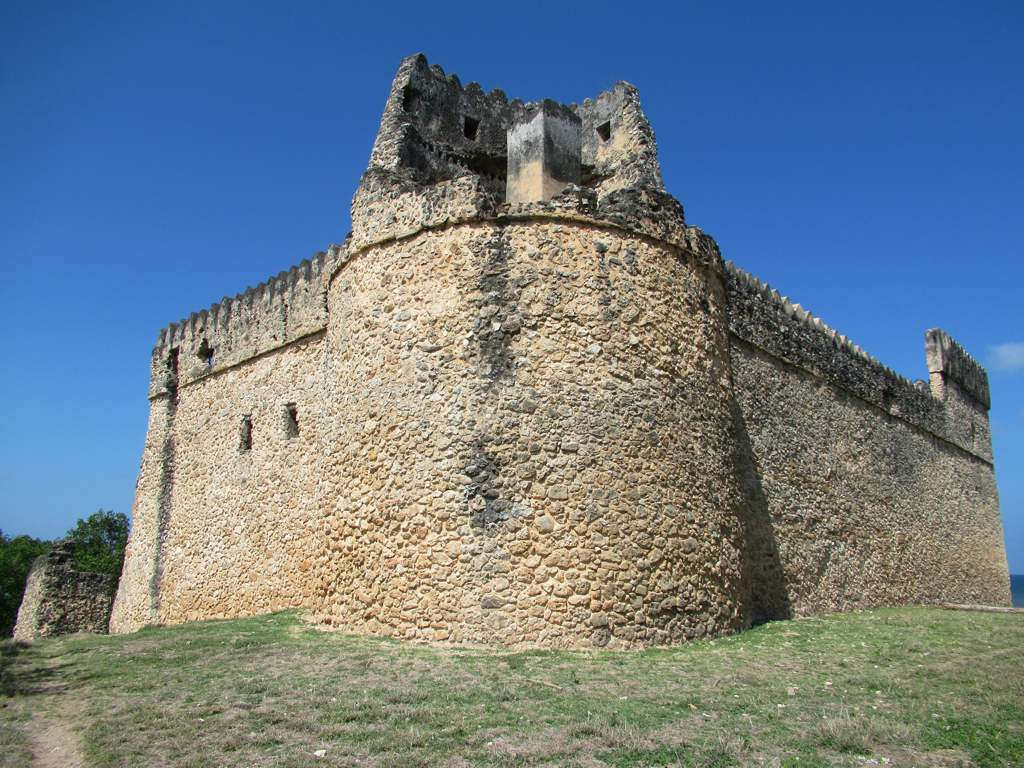

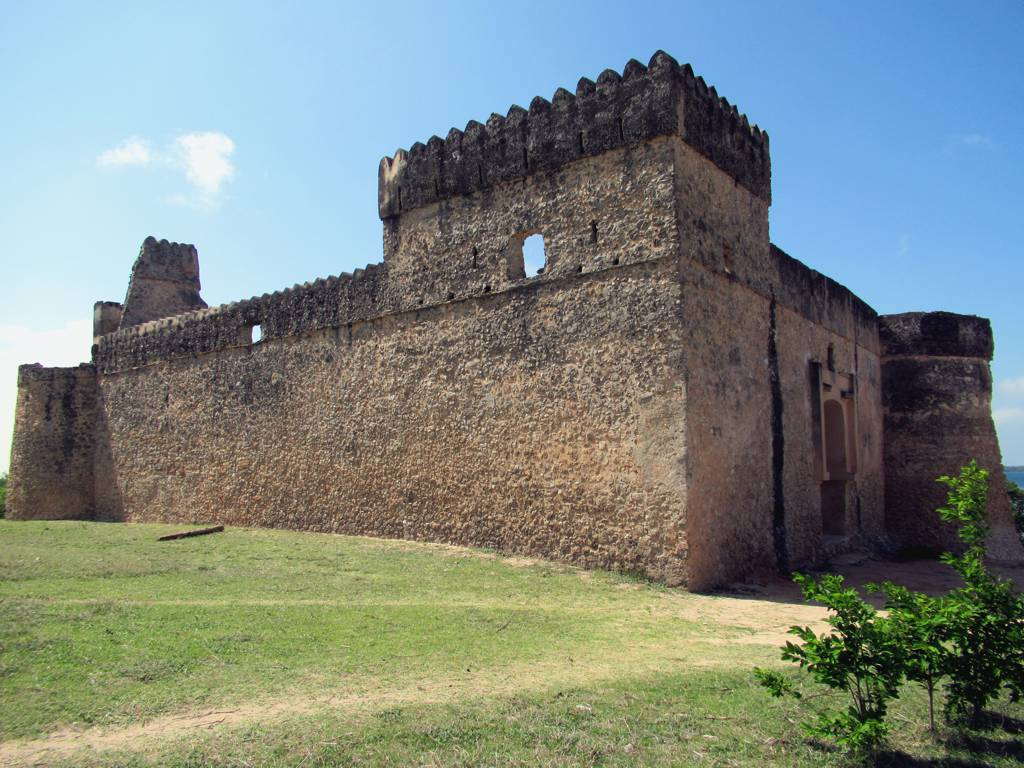

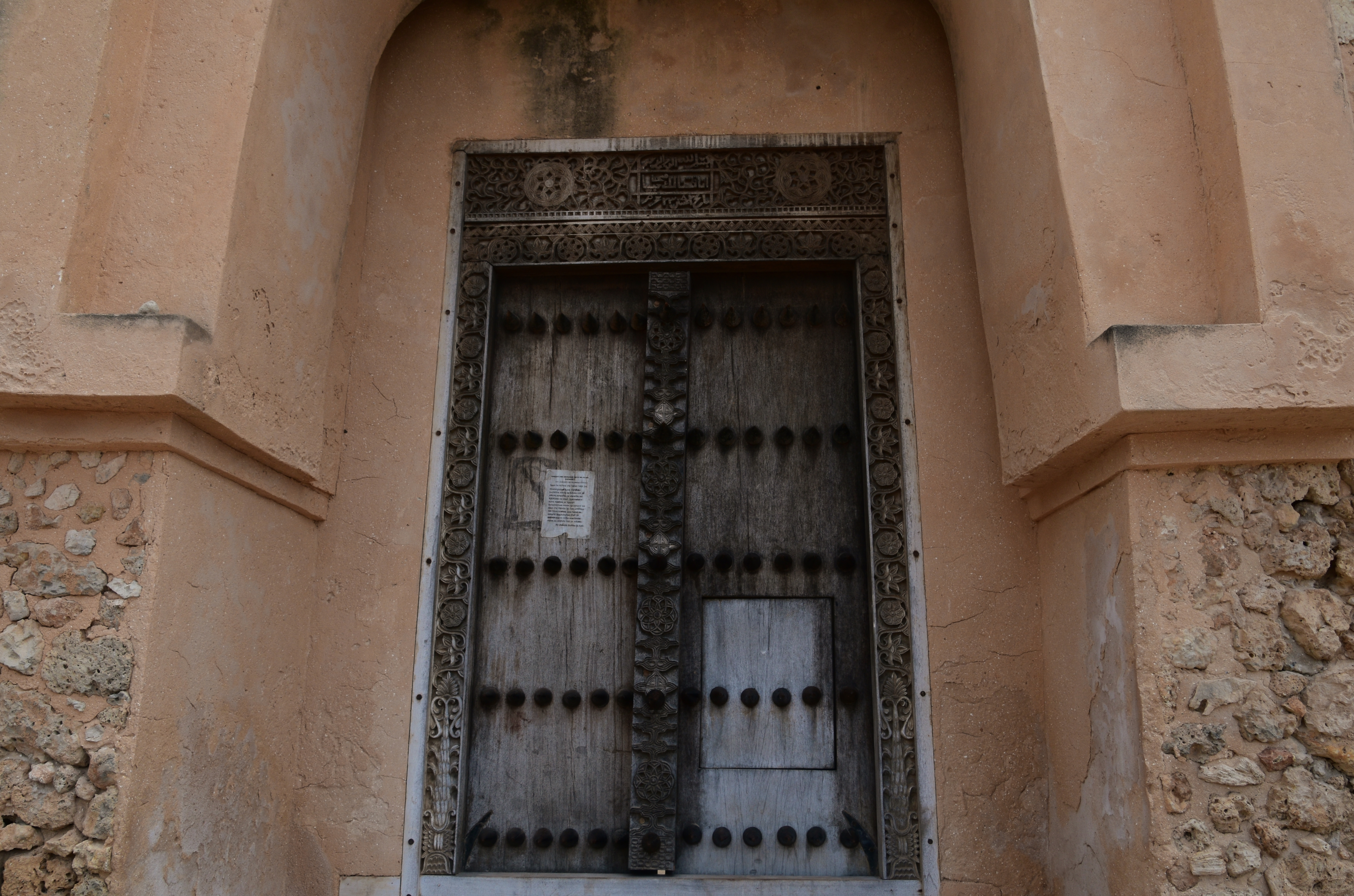

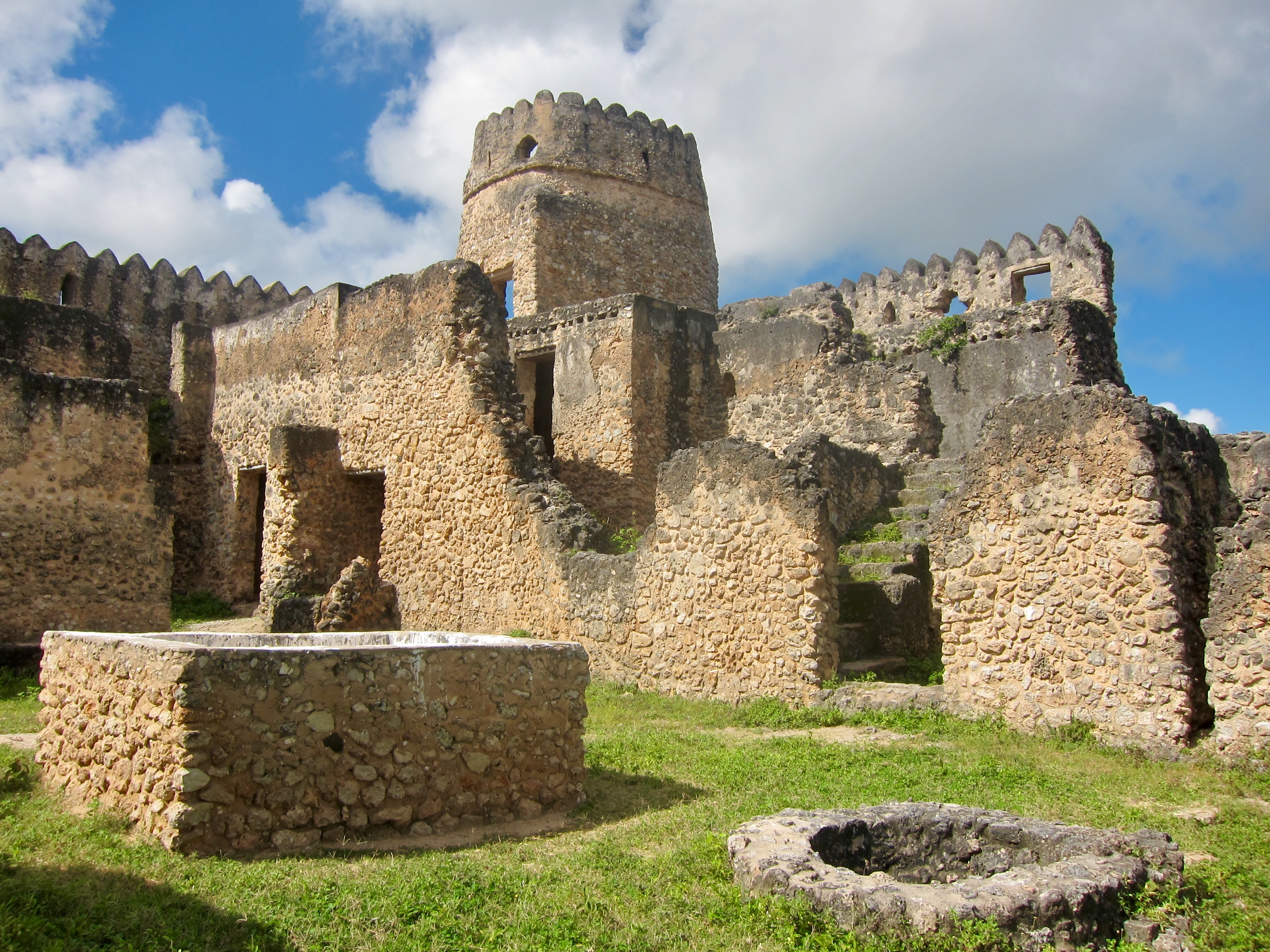

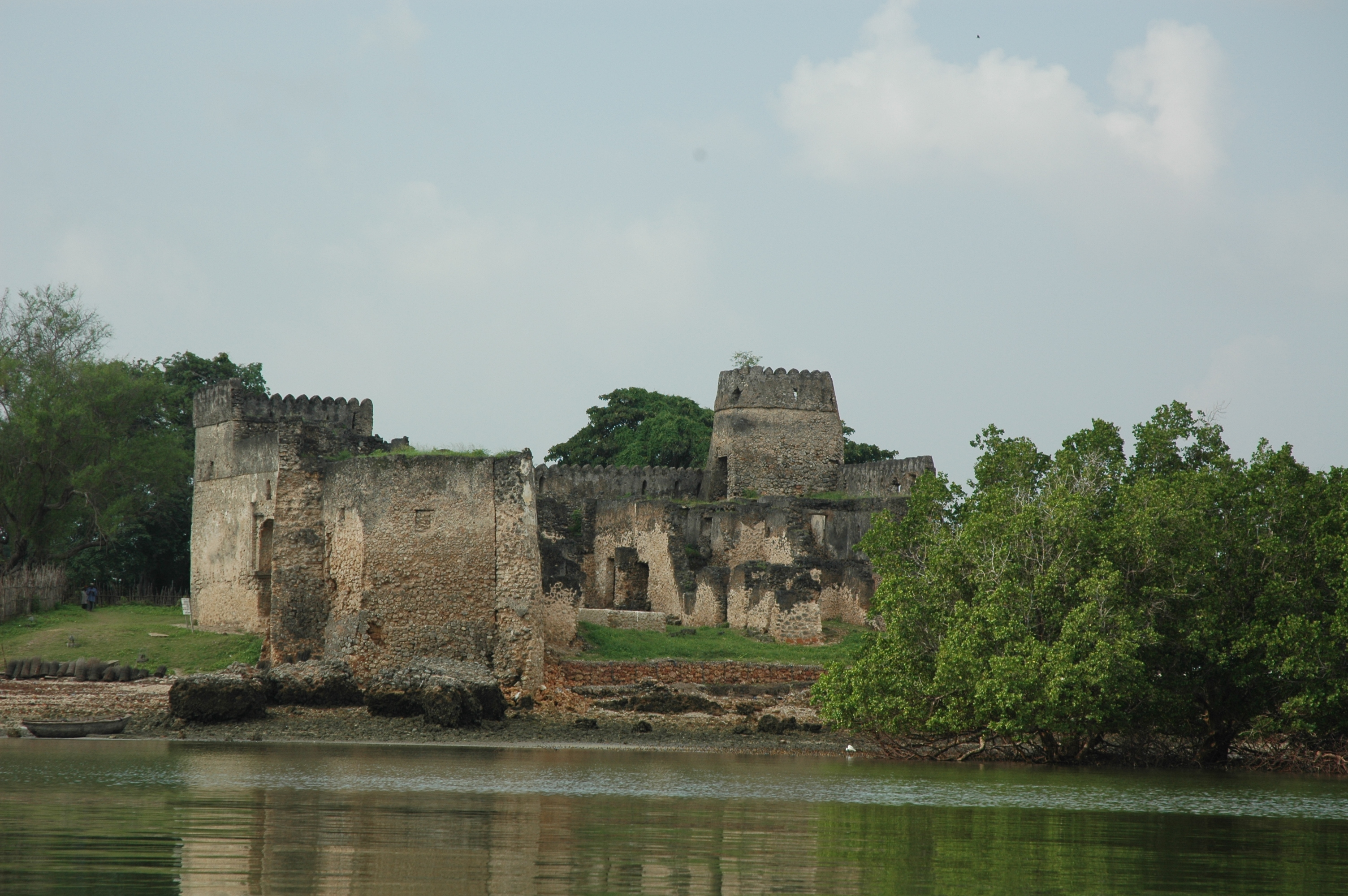

== See also ==
- Portuguese India
- Portuguese Mozambique
- Omani Empire
