= Kilwa Kisiwani =

Island, hamlet and former Swahili city-state in Lindi Region, Tanzania

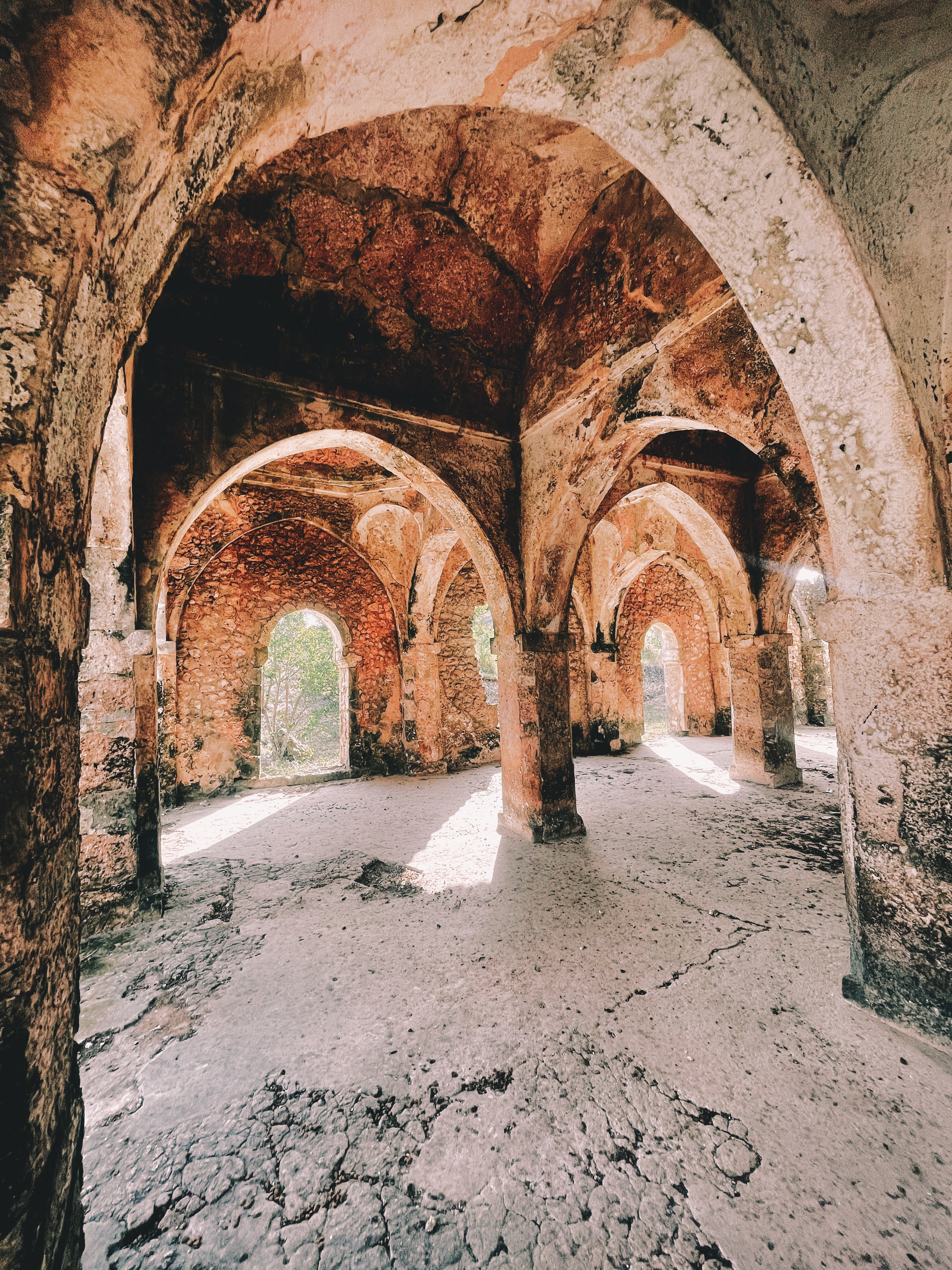
- Great Mosque of Kilwa interior

- Location within Tanzania
- 8.9600°S 39.5128°E
- Type: Settlement
- Location: Kilwa District, Lindi Region, Tanzania

History
- Built: 9th century

Site notes
- Architectural style: Swahili architecture
- Governing body: Antiquities Division, Ministry of Natural Resources and Tourism
- Owner: Tanzania Government

UNESCO World Heritage Site
- Official name: Ruins of Kilwa Kisiwani and Ruins of Songo Mnara
- Type: Cultural
- Criteria: iii
- Designated: 1981 (5th session)
- Reference no.: 144
- UNESCO Region: Africa
- Endangered: 2004–2014

National Historic Sites of Tanzania
- Official name: Kilwa Kisiwani Ruins
- Type: Cultural

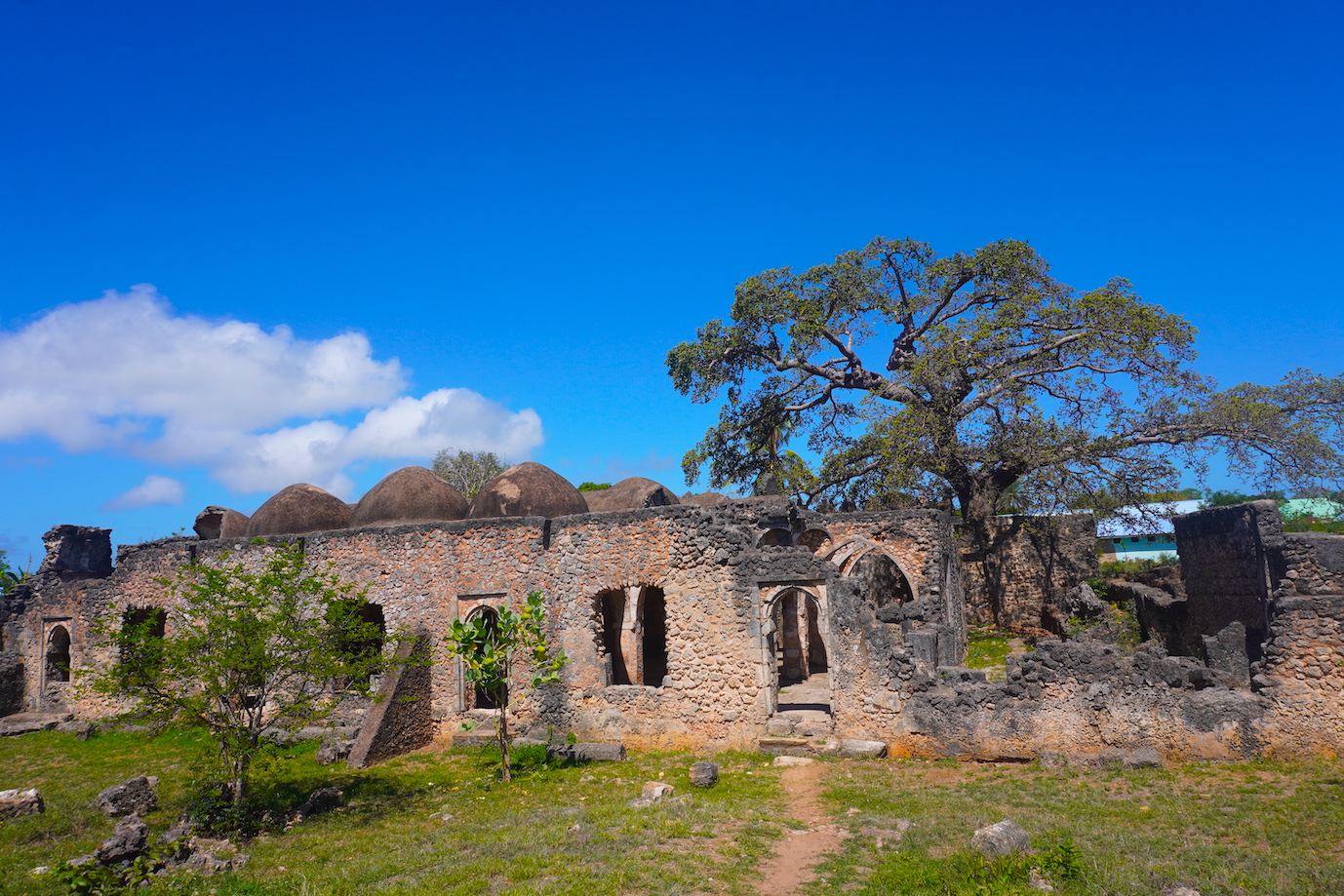
Kilwa Kisiwani ruins in Tanzania

Kilwa Kisiwani ('Kilwa Island') is an island, national historic site, and hamlet community located in the township of Kilwa Masoko, the district seat of Kilwa District in the Tanzanian region of Lindi in southern Tanzania. Kilwa Kisiwani is the largest of the nine hamlets in the town of Kilwa Masoko and is also the least populated hamlet in the township with around 1,150 residents.

Historically, it was the center of the Kilwa Sultanate, a medieval Swahili sultanate whose authority at its height in the 13th, 14th and 15th centuries stretched the entire length of the Swahili Coast. At its peak in the Middle Ages, Kilwa had over 10,000 inhabitants. Since 1981, the entire island of Kilwa Kisiwani has been designated by UNESCO as a World Heritage Site along with the nearby ruins of Songo Mnara. Apart from its significant historical reputation, Kilwa Kisiwani is still home to a small and resilient community of natives who have inhabited the island for centuries. Kilwa Kisiwani is one of the seven World Heritage Sites in Tanzania. Additionally, the site is a registered National Historic Site of Tanzania.

== Geography ==
Kilwa Kisiwani Island lies 9 degrees south of the equator. The island is 23 km (14 mi) in circumference, and the total land area is 12 km^{2} (4.6 sq mi). On the western part of the island is the Mavuji River estuary. On the southern part of the island lies the Sagarungu sound, and to the east lies the Indian Ocean.

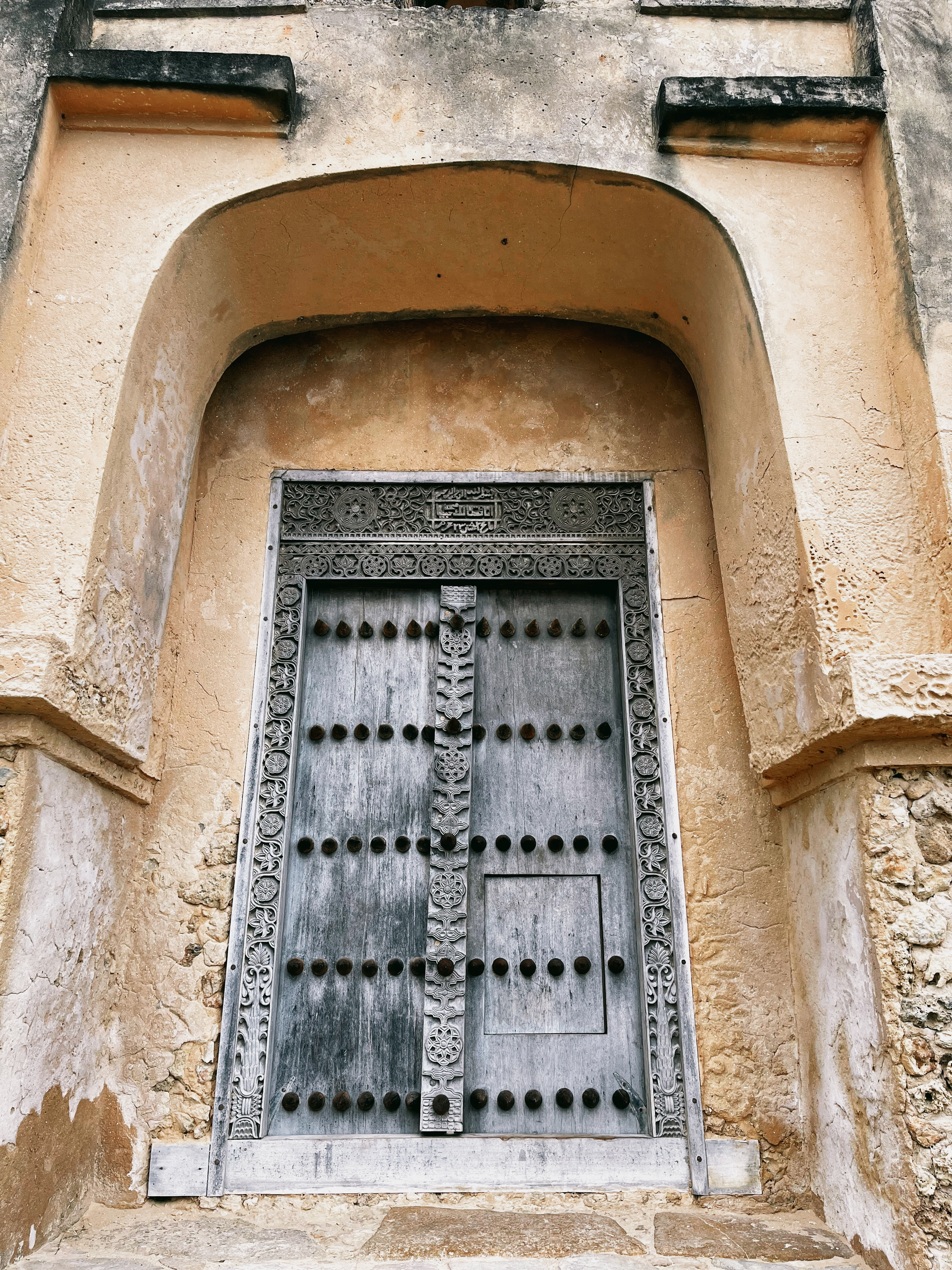
Gerezani Fort Swahili door replica on Kilwa Kisiwani

== Economy ==
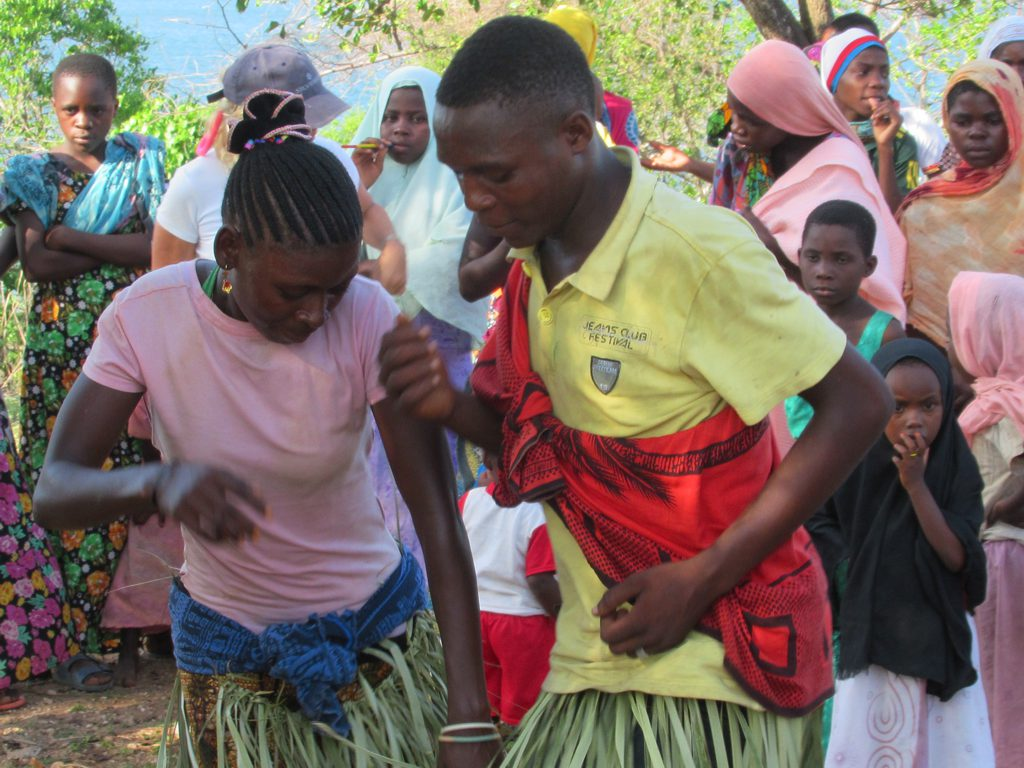
Residents of Kilwa Kisiwani dancing for overseas visitors.

The island is located with the Kilwa Masoko township authority. The main economic activities on the island are cultural tourism, fishing and subsistence agriculture. Economic growth is limited due to the island's isolation. There are no rivers and the main source for water is wells. Many of the island's freshwater wells have been used for over a millennium. The island is served by small boats to and from Kilwa Masoko. The island's only electricity is generated from solar power and has a small capacity. There are no roads on the island, thus most transport is on foot or by motorcycle.

To protect the historical integrity of the island, non-island residents are strictly prohibited from visiting the island without a permit from the tourist information center in downtown Kilwa Masoko. Much of the historical artifacts and buildings on the island have not yet been excavated.

== Historical significance ==
Kilwa Kisiwani is a former Swahili City State site located along the Swahili Coast on the Kilwa Archipelago. Recent excavations and Carbon-14 dating of the site have confirmed its founding at the start of the 9th century CE. As in other areas of the East African coast, seasonal wind reversals (or monsoons) affected trade on the island.

In 1331 CE, Moroccan traveller and scholar Ibn Battuta visited Kilwa and described it as one of the most beautiful cities in the world. Trade connections with the Arabian Peninsula as well as India and China influenced the growth and development of Kilwa, and though there are Islamic words and customs that have been adapted to the culture, its origins are African. Many of the Swahili settlements showed complex layouts that reflected social relations between groups. However at Kilwa, there are many questions still left unanswered about the town's layout after the Portuguese Empire sacked and burnt it to the ground in July 1505.

The Swahili cemeteries are located on the edge of the town, which is common for the Swahili region, and large, open spaces were likely used for social gatherings. An important city for trade, around the 13th century there were increased fortifications and a greater flow of goods. For these to take place, a form of political administration overseeing the city was needed, controlling the movement of goods and people. Much of the trade network was with the Arabian Peninsula. Kilwa Kisiwani reached its highest point in wealth and commerce between the 13th and 15th centuries.

Evidence of growth in wealth can be seen with the appearance of stone buildings around the 13th century, before which all of the buildings were wattle-and-daub. The socio-economic status of the individuals residing there has been inferred from the type of structure they were living in. Among Kilwa's trade exports were spices, tortoiseshell, coconut oil, ivory, cotton cloth, and incense (e.g. frankincense and myrrh), as well as gold. At around this time, Kilwa had seized control of the trade of gold at Sofala, Mozambique. The wealthier residents of Kilwa owned exotic textiles and foreign ceramics, though items such as luxury clothes are not preserved in the archaeological record. For approximately 500 years, Kilwa minted its own coins. This lasted from about 1100-1600 CE, and the coins have been found across the region, including Great Zimbabwe.

The local diet was dominated by seafood, supplemented by produce from the surrounding land. Due to the impact the sea had on Kilwa, including abundant marine resources and trade opportunities, the archaeological investigation of the harbors and ports is considered to be of high importance. The topsoil that covers the limestone at Kilwa was of poor quality, and so food sources on land came from the areas of higher ground. However, the soil in the Kilwa region was suitable for growing cotton, which could be used in sail manufacturing. Spindle whorls from the 12th century have been found, indicating that cotton was used and processed in this area.

=== Ceramics ===
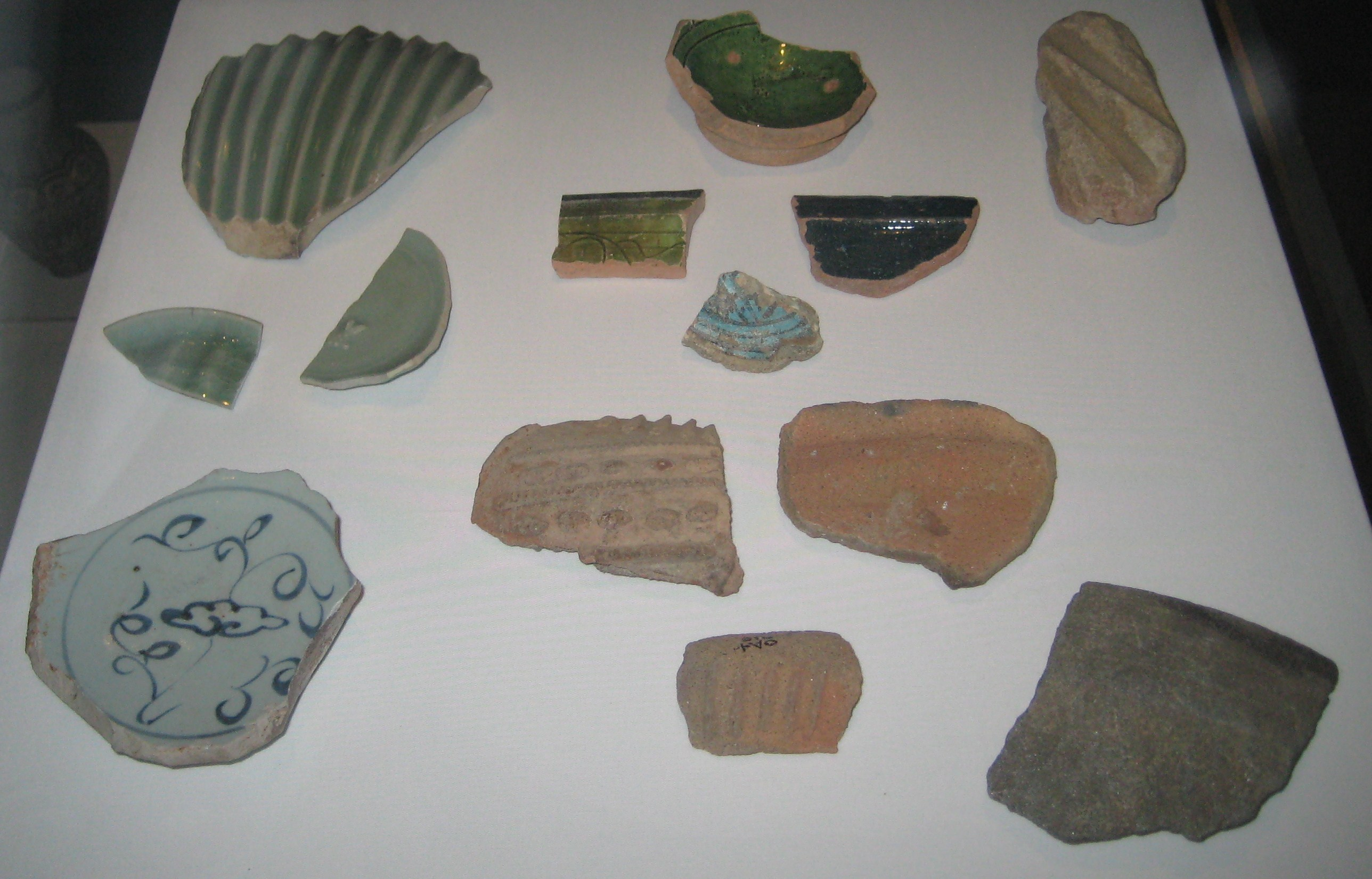
Kilwa pot sherds about 1000 to 1500.

At first, most of the focus was placed on the archaeology of Kilwa's ports and harbors, however, more and more emphasis is being placed on Kilwa's hinterlands. Ceramic artifacts are plentiful at the site and can be divided into two groups: regional and coastal. All of the ceramics with regional distribution were locally produced, but the area of distribution is limited. These unglazed ceramics were referred to as Kitchen Wares, though their uses were not necessarily just as cooking vessels. All of the varieties of locally produced pottery found in the region were also uncovered at the site of Kilwa itself.

While the Kitchen Wares could be seen throughout the region, there were ceramics that were mostly seen within Kilwa itself. These included modeled forms and red-burnished wares. The distribution pattern of the red-burnished wares was coastal. Other ceramic types that were seemingly restricted to town were the imported ceramic vessels from the Arabian peninsula and China. Imported ceramic materials are not found in rural areas. They were used as a sign of social status by the elite, kept in wall niches specifically crafted for their display. These imported ceramics played important symbolic roles along the Swahili Coast. The symbolism attached to the imported ceramics was so strong that it carried on to modern Swahili culture. The lack of imported goods in the hinterlands indicates that, while Kilwa was undergoing a process of urbanization, the other local communities did not undergo a dramatic transformation.

=== Ancient DNA analysis ===
A study by Brielle et al. in 2023 completed ancient DNA analysis of several samples from the ruins of Kilwa. Ancient DNA (aDNA) analysis was completed for 80 individuals from six medieval and early modern (1250–1800 CE) coastal towns and an inland town after 1650 in order to determine the proportions of "African-like, Persian-like, and Indian-like" DNA sequences. More than half of the DNA of many of the individuals from coastal towns originated from primarily female ancestors from Africa, with a large proportion — sometimes more than half—of the DNA coming from Asian ancestors. The Asian ancestry includes components associated with Persia and India, with 80–90% of the Asian DNA originating from Persian men. Peoples of African and Asian (predominantly Persian) origins began to mix by about 1000 CE. Samples were taken from two boxes of human remains located in the British Institute in Eastern Africa (BIEA) in Nairobi, originally excavated in the 1950s and 1960s by Chittick.

After 1500, the sources of male Asian DNA became increasingly Arabian, consistent with increased interactions with southern Arabia. From medieval times until the modern day, subsequent interactions with different Asian and African people have changed the ancestry of the present-day people living on the Swahili coast compared to the medieval individuals whose DNA was sequenced.

Potentially dating from 1300-1600 (more precise radiocarbon dating techniques were unable to be completed in time for these samples), analysis was completed of the individuals' mitochondrial DNA (mtDNA), autosomal DNA, Y chromosome DNA, and X chromosome DNA. Analysis of mtDNA in the individual, demonstrating maternal ancestry patterns, showed a L* haplotype. The L* haplotype is predominantly found in present-day Sub-Saharan African populations. Y chromosome analysis, demonstrating paternal ancestry patterns, showed that the individual was carrying the J2 haplotype, a DNA pattern found in Southwest Asian or Persian individuals. X chromosomes, containing larger maternal influence, were compared with the 22 autosomal chromosomes, which contain equal maternal and paternal influence. X chromosomes contained more indicators of African ancestry compared to the autosomal DNA, further adding to evidence of African ancestry on the maternal side and Persian or Southeast Asian ancestry on the paternal side.

=== Preservation ===
In 2004, Kilwa Kisiwani was inscribed in UNESCO's List of World Heritage in Danger. There is a serious rapid deterioration of the archaeological and monumental heritage of these two islands due to various agents like erosion and vegetation. The eastern section of the Palace of Husuni Kubwa, for example, is progressively disappearing. The damage to the soil caused by rainwater wash is accentuating the risks of collapse of the remaining structures on the edge of the cliff. The vegetation that proliferates on the cliff has limited the progression of the rain-wash effect but causes the break-up of the masonry structures. A team of CHAM volunteers ensured the protection of the ancient city between 2001 and 2007.

The World Monuments Fund included Kilwa on its 2008 Watch List of 100 Most Endangered Sites, and since 2008 has been supporting conservation work on various buildings. In 2014 it was removed from the list.

== Repatriation of ancestral human remains ==
=== Archaeological excavations and removal of human remains ===
During the late colonial period, archeological excavations in the Kilwa region of present day Tanzania resulted in the removal of human skeletal remains for research purposed. Among the archeologists working in the region was Neville Chittick, wo became Tanganyika's first conservator of antiquities in 1957 and subsequently conducted research on the archeology and history of Swahili civilization.

According to research published by Open Restitution Africa, Chittick removed unidentified human remains from graves in the Kilwa District during the late 1950s. Following his appointment as director of the British Institute in Eastern Africa in 1962, the remains were transferred to Kenya, where they were retained the institutes storage facilities in Nairobi.

The remains were reportedly intended for further scientific analysis, including possible examination in Britain, but this research was not completed. They remained in the institute's custody for several decades with limited documentation concerning heir original burial locations and community affiliations.

=== Early returns and renewed repatriation efforts ===
The return of the ancestral remains from Kilwa to Tanzania begam in 2016 when the British Institute on Eastern Africa facilitated the return of a smaller group of human remains and cultural materials to the National Museum of Tanzania, although a larger collection remained in Nairobi.

Renewed efforts began in August 2022, during the 16th Congress of Pan African Archaeological Association for Prehistory and related Studies in Zanzibar. At the conference, Kennedy Gitu, a research fellow associated with the British Institute in Eastern Africa discussed the remaining collection with Emmanuel Yacobo, director of the National Museum in Tanzania. The discussion led to a collaborative initiative to catalogue the remains and arrange for their return. In September 2022, the researchers submitted documentation to the Ministry of Natural Resources and Tourism in Tanzania requesting authorization for the transfer. The process also required an engagement with the National museum of Kenya concerning the movement or archeological materials across national borders.

=== Return to Tanzania in 2023 ===
In March 2023, the remaining human remains from Kilwa were transported by road from Nairobi, Kenya to Dar es Salaam, Tanzania in a repatriation coordinated by the British Institute in Eastern Africa and the National Museum of Tanzania. The British Institute provided logistical and financial support or the transfer, including packing and transportation. Following their arrival, the remains were placed in the custody of the National Museum of Tanzania.

== Historic buildings ==
=== Great Mosque ===
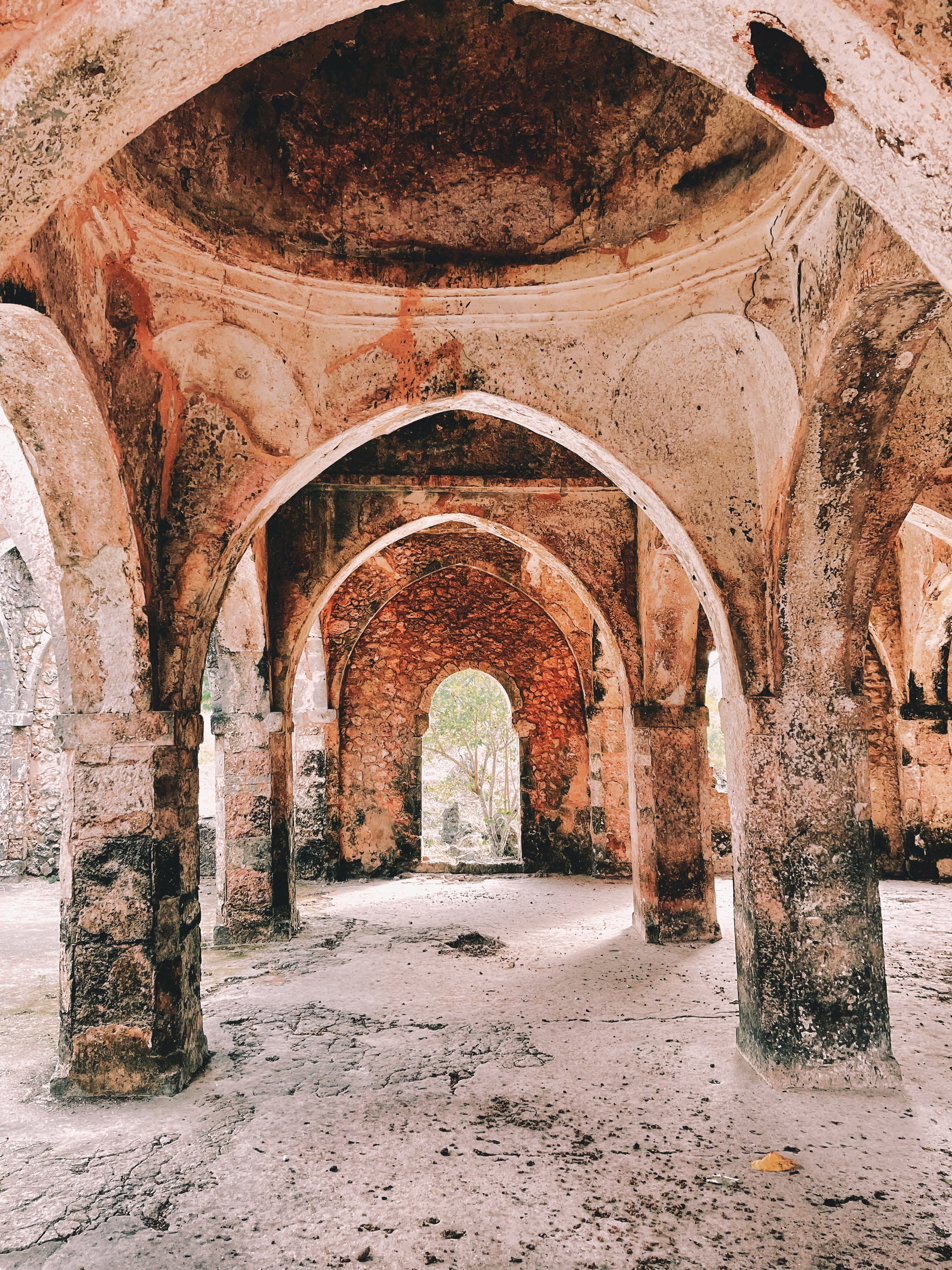
Great Mosque Kilwa Kisiwani, Kilwa Masoko Ward, Kilwa District, Lindi Region

==== Early construction ====
The earliest section, likely the northern prayer hall, dates back to the 12th century. Built between 1131 and 1170 (according to historical records.), this rectangular structure showcased typical construction of the period. The load-bearing walls were built with square coral limestone blocks, and three symmetrical entrances with vaulted ceilings provided access. Uniquely for mosques in the area, the flat roof was supported by nine hexagonal columns made from single tree trunks.

Archaeological discoveries have shed light on the original design. The roof, constructed from coral tiles embedded in mortar, featured decorative concentric circles. Traces of red paint suggest the mosque may have been adorned in red and black, adding a touch of color.

==== Later additions and renovations ====
The early 14th century saw a major expansion under Sultan al-Hasan ibn Sulaiman, who also constructed the nearby palace of Husuni Kubwa. This extension likely included the grand dome described by Ibn Battuta during his visit in 1331.

The mihrab, the niche indicating the direction of prayer, appears to be a later addition. Its design – a pointed arch, capitals, pilasters, friezes, and a fluted half-dome vault – differs from the original structure. Interestingly, protruding coral blocks suggest the presence of a fixed wooden minbar, and traces of oblong niches within the main niche hint at a possible Shirazi influence. These elements may have been incorporated from an earlier design during renovations.

==== Water management system ====
The western section of the mosque housed the ablution area, essential for worshippers to perform ritual cleansing before prayers. Restoration efforts unearthed an intricate network of water channels made from baked clay, providing insights into the mosque's well-designed water management system.

=== Palace of Husuni Kubwa ===
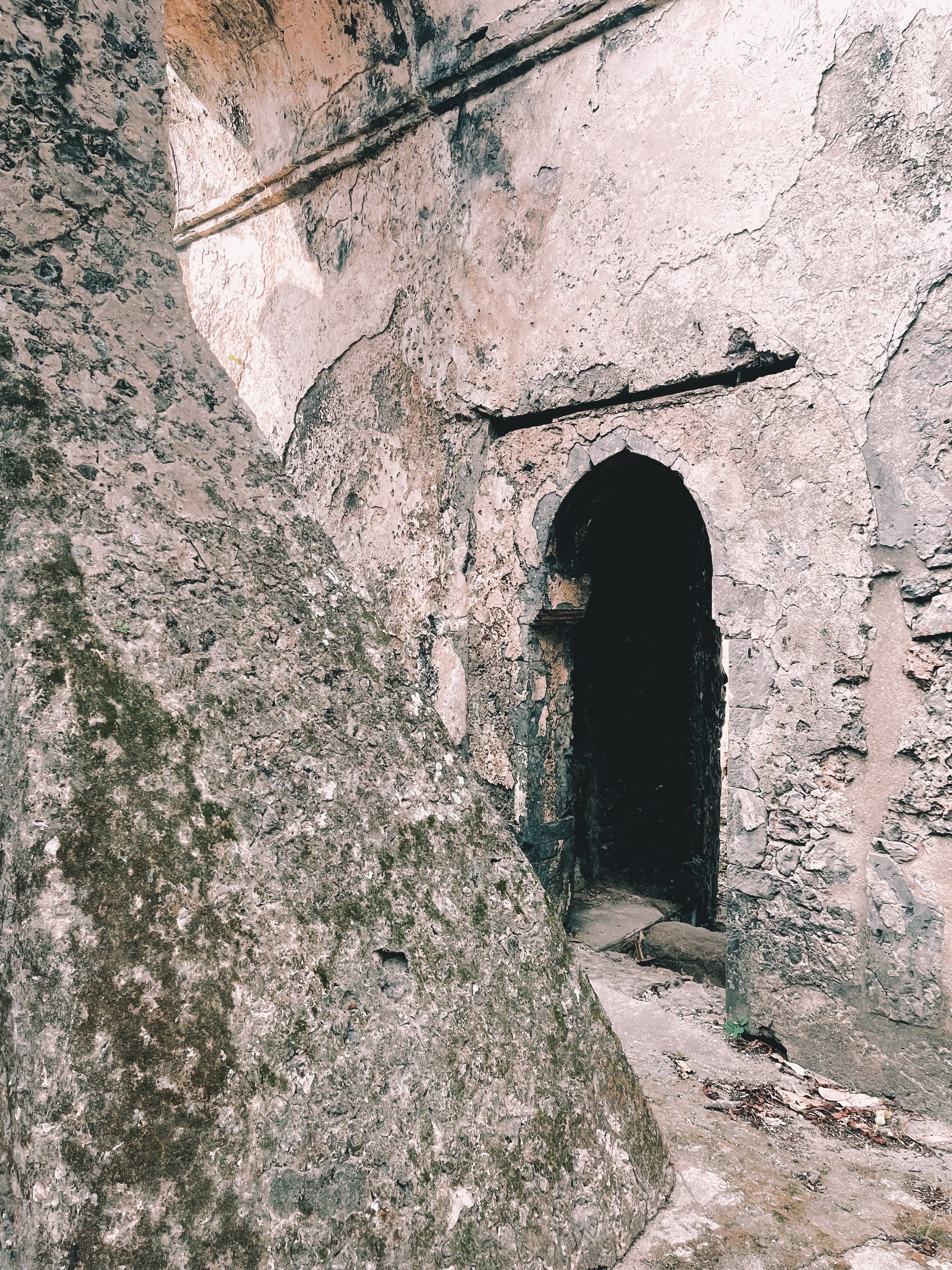
Palace in Kilwa Kisiwani of Kilwa Masoko Ward, Kilwa District, Lindi Region, UNESCO WHS

Husuni Kubwa (the "Great Palace"), situated outside the town, was an early 14th-century sultan's palace and emporium. Other defining features include causeways and platforms at the entrance of the harbour made from blocks of reef and coral nearly a meter high. These act as breakwaters, allowing mangroves to grow which is one of the ways the breakwater can be spotted from a distance. Some parts of the causeway are made from the bedrock, but usually the bedrock was used as a base. Coral stone was used to build up the causeways with sand and lime being used to cement the cobbles together. Some of the stones were left loose.

The Palace of Husuni Kubwa is another prominent structure in Kilwa. Most of the palace was erected in the 14th century by Sultan al-Hasan ibn Sulaiman of the Mahdali dynasty, who also built an extension to the nearby Great Mosque of Kilwa, although portions may date back to the 13th century. For unknown reasons, the palace was inhabited only for a brief period of time, and abandoned before its completion.

In true Swahili architecture style the structure was built out of coral stone on a high bluff overlooking the Indian Ocean. It consists of three major elements: a south court, used primarily for commerce; a residential complex including over one hundred individual rooms; and a wide stairway leading down to a mosque on the beach.

Other notable features include a pavilion, which likely served as a reception hall, and an octagonal swimming pool. All of Husuni Kubwa spans across approximately two acres. The coral rag was set in limestone mortar and cut stone was used for decorative pieces, door jams, and vaults. The rooms were about 3 meters tall. The roof was made from cut limestone blocks laid across cut timbers and the floors were white plaster. The main entrance to Husuni Kubwa is from the shore.

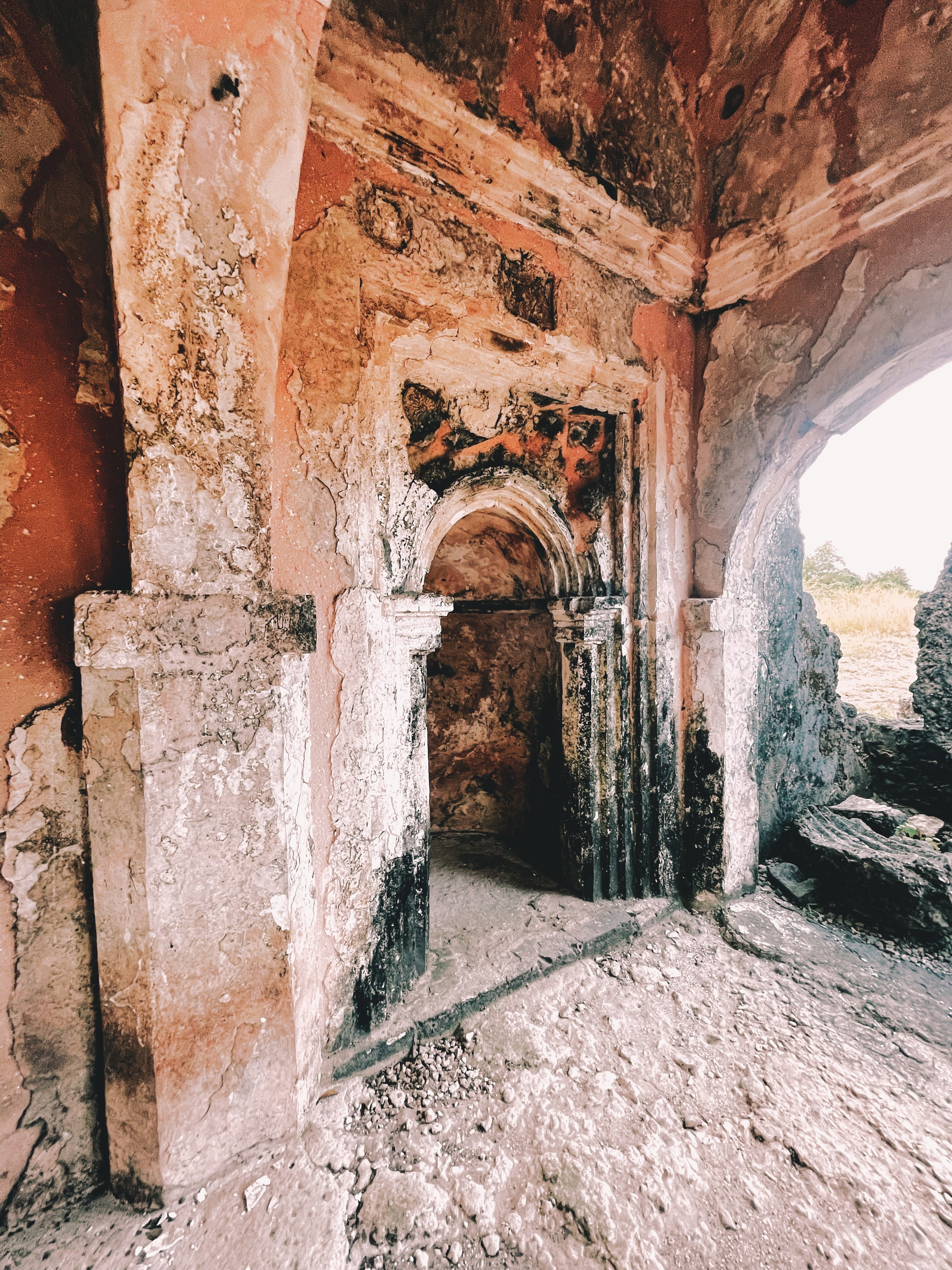
Interior of Small Mosque in Kilwa Kisiwani of Kilwa Masoko Ward, Kilwa District, Lindi Region

Most of the imported glazed pottery recovered at the site was Chinese celadon, though there were a few Ying Ch'ing stoneware sherds found, and a Yuan dynasty flask dated to about 1300 CE. Neither the Kilwa Chronicle nor any other Portuguese accounts describe a building comparable to Husuni Kubwa.

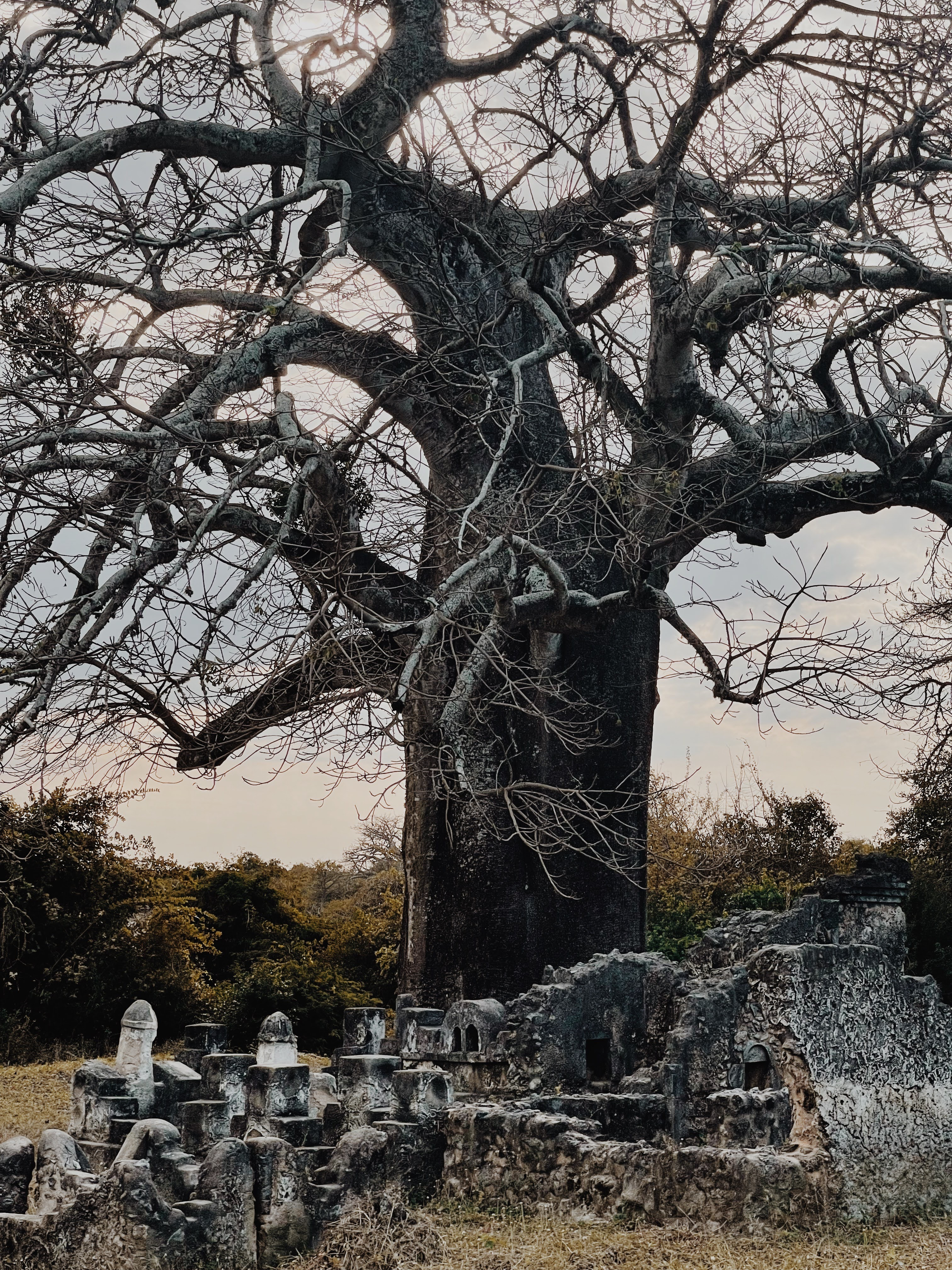
Medieval Swahili cemetery of Kilwa Kisiwani in Kilwa Masoko Ward, Kilwa District, Lindi Region, UNESCO WHS

=== Husuni Ndogo ===
Husuni Ndogo ("Little Palace") is built from coral rubble and limestone mortar. The rectangular enclosure wall surrounds the complex and at each corner stands a tower. The foundations extend two meters below ground level. It appears to have been built as a fort, but the exact purposes and uses are somewhat unknown. There is some evidence that it, for at least a time, was used as a mosque. Architecturally, it appears to be different from other buildings along the coast, resembling buildings constructed under the Caliphs of the Umayyad at around 661-750 CE. However, whether or not the structure is related or even dates to the Arabic buildings remains uncertain, though it seems unlikely.

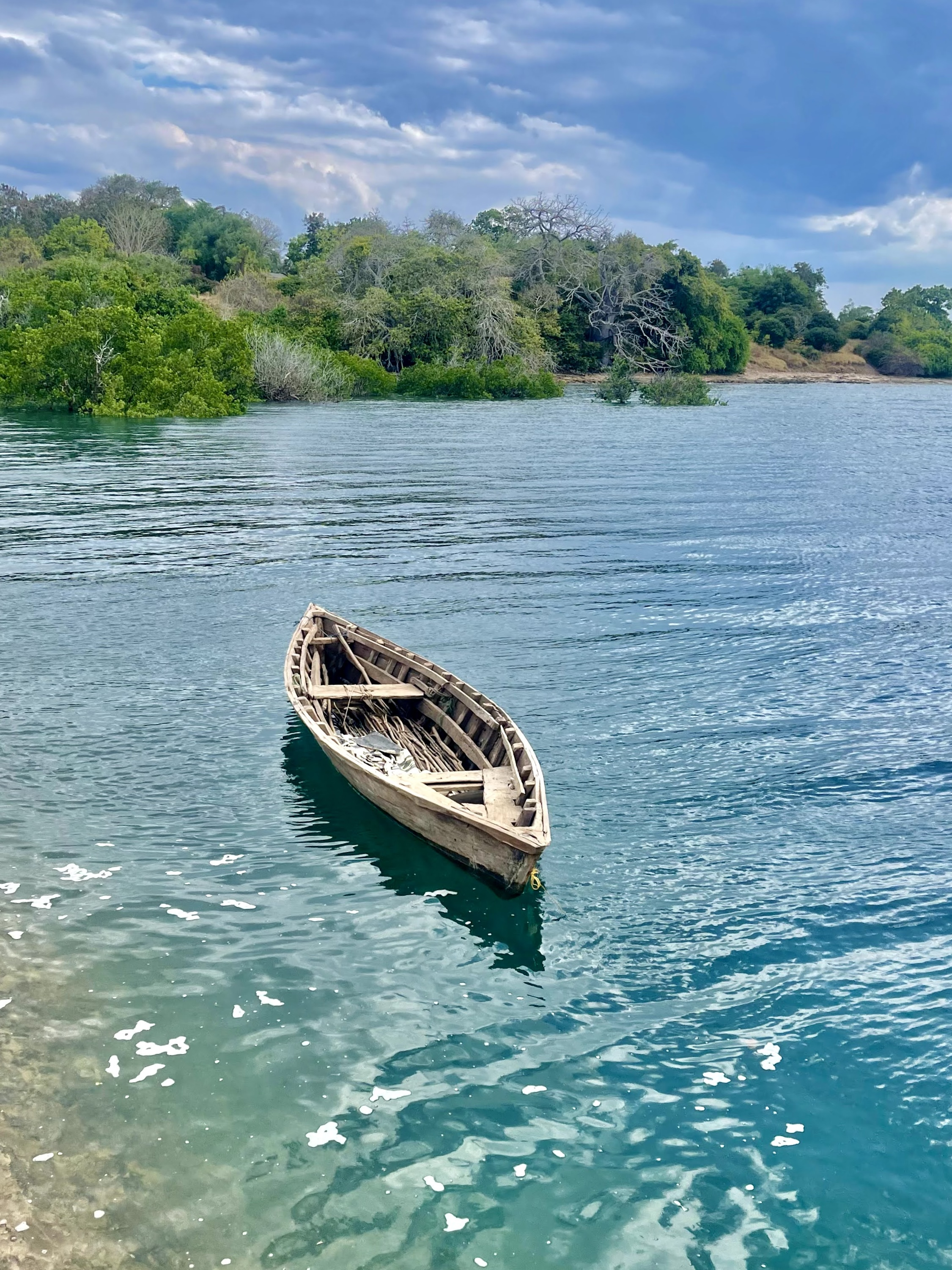
Boat on Kilwa Kisiwani in Kilwa Masoko Ward, Kilwa District, Lindi Region, UNESCO WHS

=== Gereza Fort ===
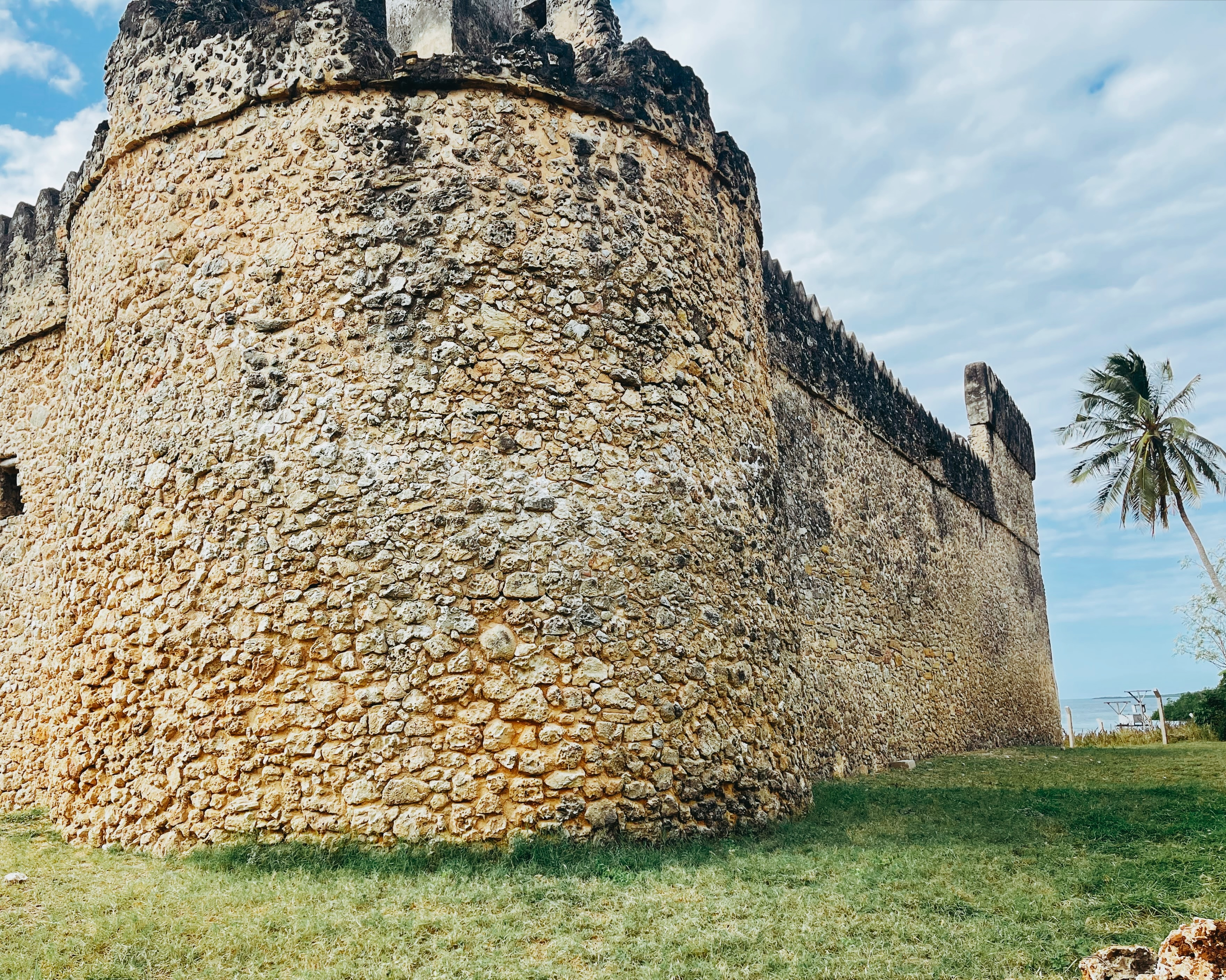
Gerezani, Kilwa Kisiwani, Kilwa Masoko Ward, Kilwa District, Lindi Region

The Gereza Fort (also called the Arab Fort) is situated between the Makutani Palace and the Great Mosque. There are some evidence that the original structure was Portuguese, while the present form of the fort is of typical Omani forts. The word Gereza means prison in Swahili, possibly indicating the use of the fort as an Omani slave holding building during the late 18th century to late 19th century after the collapse of the Swahili civilization after the arrival of the Portuguese in late 16th century.

== Controversies ==
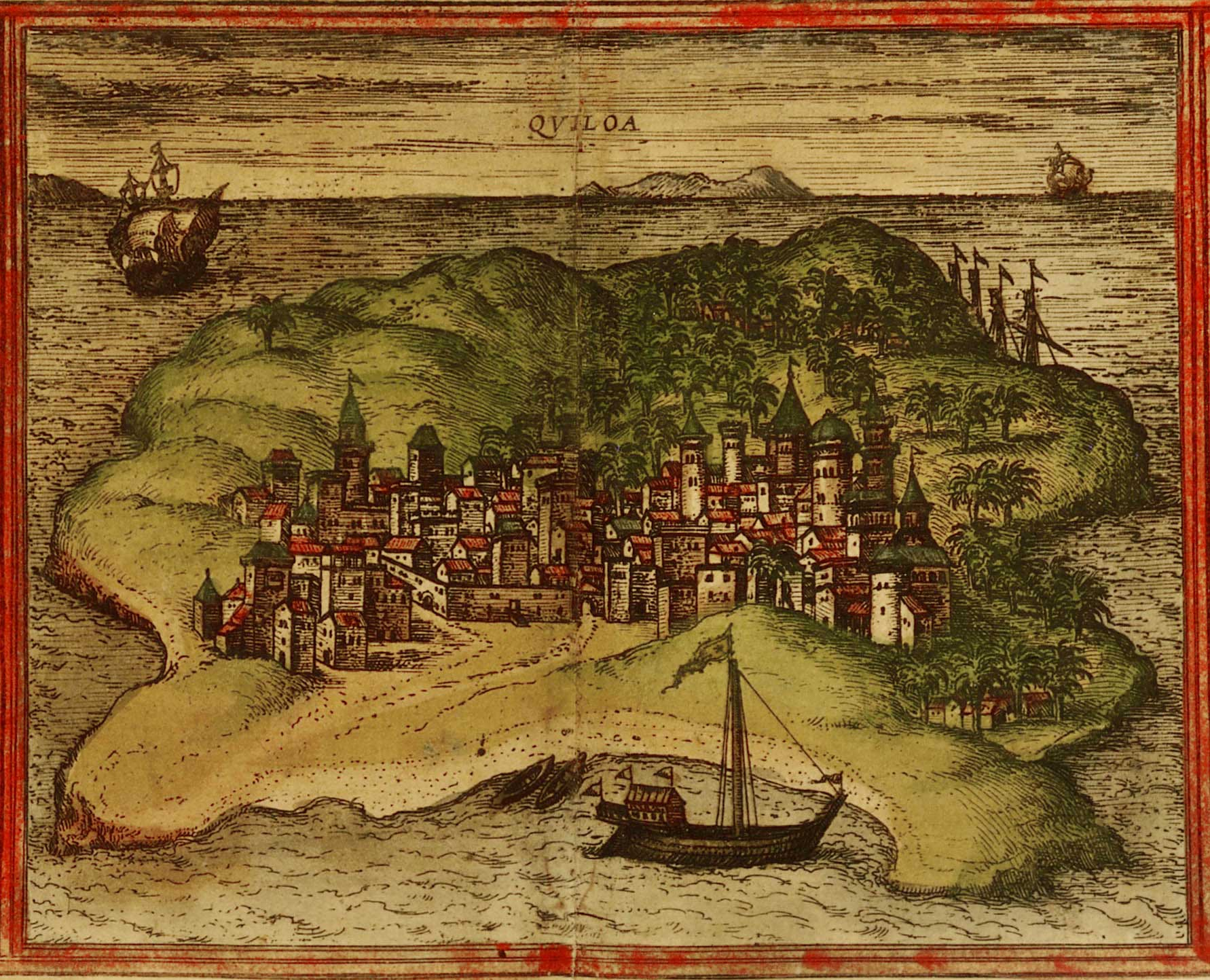
A 1572 depiction of the city of Kilwa from Georg Braun and Frans Hogenberg's atlas Civitates orbis terrarum.

Much of Kilwa's history has been written by Omani and European colonial administrators in the 19th century, and there has been some contradictory evidence on the origins and the role of foreign immigrants in Kilwa's history.

According to local oral tradition, in the 11th century the island of Kilwa Kisiwani was sold to Ali bin Hasan, son of the "King" of Shiraz, in Persia. Another tradition relates that his mother was Somali. Ali bin Al-Hasan is credited with founding the island city and with marrying the daughter of the local king. Though he was credited with the founding, he had arrived at an already inhabited area. He did, however, come to power and is credited with fortifying the city and increasing trade. Tradition also relates that it was the child of this union who founded the Kilwa Sultanate.

Archaeological and documentary research has revealed that over the next few centuries, Kilwa grew to be a substantial city and the leading commercial entrepôt on the southern half of the Swahili Coast (roughly from the present Tanzanian-Kenya border southward to the mouth of the Zambezi River), trading extensively with states of the southeast African hinterland as far as Zimbabwe. Trade was mainly in gold, iron, ivory and other animal products of the interior for beads, textiles, jewelry, porcelain and spices from Asia. On the other side, there is no evidence of Shirazi-based Shia Islam in Kilwa and the entire East African coast.

By the 14th century, under the rule of the Abul-Mawahib (Mahdali) dynasty, Kilwa had become the most powerful city on the Swahili Coast. At the zenith of its power in the 15th century, the Kilwa Sultanate claimed authority over the city-states of Malindi, Mvita (Mombasa), Pemba Island, Zanzibar, Mafia Island, Comoro, Sofala and the trading posts across the channel on Madagascar.

Ibn Battuta recorded his visit to the city around 1331, and commented favorably on the generosity, humility, and religion of its ruler, Sultan al-Hasan ibn Sulaiman. Ibn Battuta also described how the sultan would go into the interior and raid the people taking slaves and other forms of wealth. He was also particularly impressed by the planning of the city and believed that this was the reason for Kilwa's success along the coast. From this period date the construction of the Palace of Husuni Kubwa and a significant extension to the Great Mosque of Kilwa, made of coral stones and the largest mosque of its kind. According to Ibn Battuta, Kilwa was an important and wealthy city for the trade of gold. Because of trade, some of the people who lived in Kilwa had a higher standard of living, but many others were poor. The wealthy enjoyed indoor plumbing in their stone homes and the poor lived in mud huts with thatched roofs.

In the early 16th century, Portuguese explorer Vasco da Gama, after a series of conflicts, exacted tribute from the wealthy Islamic state. In 1505 another Portuguese force commanded by D. Francisco de Almeida took control of the island and sacked it after besieging it. It remained in Portuguese hands until 1512, when the Portuguese abandoned their outpost. The city regained some of its earlier prosperity, but in 1784 was conquered by the Omani rulers of Zanzibar. In 1776, the ruler of Kilwa signed a treaty with a French merchant to deliver 1,000 slaves per year at twenty piastres each and two piastres as a present to the king. After the Omani conquest, the French built and manned a fort at the northern tip of the island, but the city itself was abandoned in the 1840s. It was later part of the colony of German East Africa from 1886 to 1918.

== Health and education ==
Since the resident island population at present is slightly more than 1000 people, there is one primary school, the Lyahi Koranic Middle school. Older students move to the mainland for further education. There are no healthcare facilities on the island so residents have to take the boat to the mainland to receive healthcare at either the Masoka Urban Health Center or the Masoko BAKWATA Dispensary, both in Kilwa Masoko.

== See also ==
- Historic Swahili Settlements
- Swahili architecture
