= Sanje ya Kati =

Medieval Swahili settlement in Kilwa District, Lindi Region

Coordinates: 9°3′14″S 39°32′1″E

Sanje ya Kati Ruins
- Kisiwa cha kale cha Sanje ya Kati (Swahili)
- Location within Tanzania
- Type: Medieval Settlement
- Cultures: Swahili
- Location: Tanzania
- Region: Lindi Region
- Part of: Swahili Culture

History
- Built: 10th century AD
- Built by: Swahili people
- Abandoned: unknown

Site notes
- Material: Coral rag
- Excavation dates: none
- Owner: Tanzanian Government
- Public access: Yes

National Historic Sites of Tanzania
- Official name: Sanje ya Kati National Historic Site
- Type: Cultural

Sanje ya Kati (Swahili Kisiwa cha kale cha Sanje ya Kati) is a protected, uninhabited historic site located on Sanje ya Kati Island in Pande Mikoma ward in Kilwa District, Lindi Region of Tanzania's Indian Ocean coast. The site is home to medieval Swahili ruins that have yet to be fully excavated.

Sanje ya Kati hosts significant archaeological ruins, a fortified trading post that includes a significant structure – the Sanje ya Kati mosque.

== The mosque ==
Constructed sometime in the latter half of the 11th century, the mosque shares design elements with the early Shirazi mosque found on Kilwa Kisiwani. Built with precisely cut coral blocks, the mosque measures approximately 10.21 by 9.46 meters (33.5 by 31.0 ft).

The prayer hall features symmetrical entrances on opposite walls and evidence of past structural support through four wooden columns. The foundation rests on a platform of sand, suggesting an earlier phase of construction possibly dating back to the beginning of the 11th century. The current mosque structure itself is believed to have been built later in the century.

The mihrab, a niche indicating the direction of prayer, differs from typical Swahili mosque designs. Unlike protruding structures, this mihrab is seamlessly integrated into the wall. This unique feature has led some researchers to propose a possible association with the Ibadi Muslim community.

Flanking the rectangular prayer hall, which measures approximately 10 by 9 meters (33 by 30 ft), are two wings. The east wing housed the main entrance, while the south wing featured a platform and a courtyard with a well. Notably, the well predates the current mosque structure.

Excavations have revealed evidence of an even earlier mosque at the site. Reused blocks with high-quality stucco decoration suggest a potentially grander structure built in the mid-11th century.

== See also ==
- Historic Swahili Settlements
- National Historic Sites in Tanzania
- Swahili architecture
