= Sanje ya Kati Island =

Island in Kilwa District of Lindi Region

Coordinates: 9°3′14″S 39°32′1″E

Native name: Kisiwa cha Sanje ya Kati (Swahili)
- Location within Tanzania

Geography
- Location: Indian Ocean
- Total islands: 1
- Major islands: 1
- Highest elevation: 14 m (46 ft)

Administration
- Tanzania
- Region: Lindi Region

Demographics
- Ethnic groups: Machinga

Sanje ya Kati Island or Kati Island is an island located in Pande Mikoma ward in Kilwa District in Lindi Region of Tanzania's Indian Ocean coast. The island is home to a medieval Swahili ruin of Sanje ya Kati. The island has an average elevation of 14 m (46 ft). The island is the ancestral home of the Machinga people.
