= Songo Mnara Island =

Island in Kilwa District of Lindi Region

Coordinates: 9°3′54.36″S 39°34′46.2″E

Native name: Kisiwa cha Songo Mnara (Swahili)
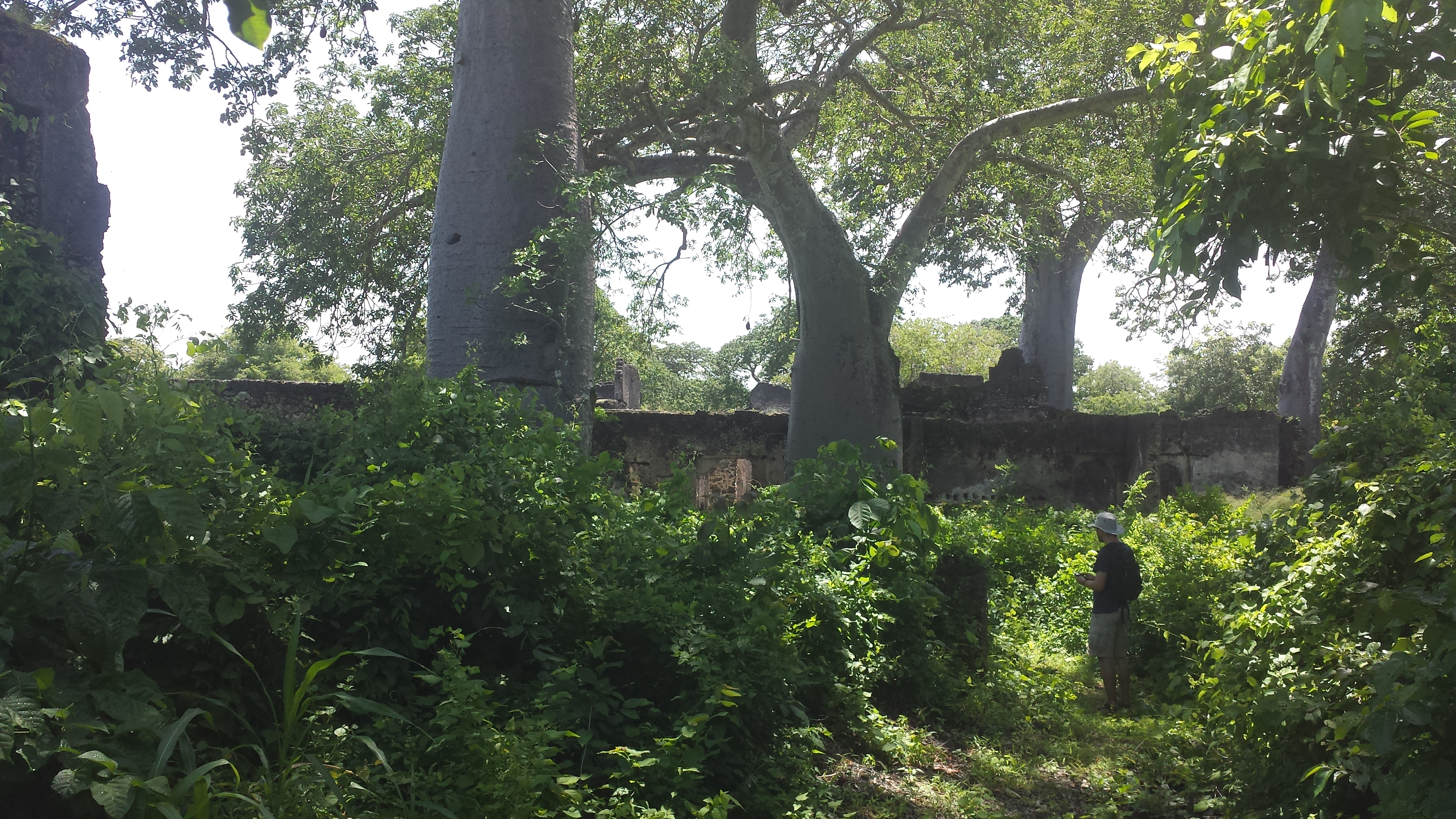
- Songo Mnara Main building, Songo Mnara Island

- Location within Tanzania

Geography
- Location: Indian Ocean
- Total islands: 1
- Major islands: 1
- Highest elevation: 9 m (30 ft)

Administration
- Tanzania
- Region: Lindi Region

Demographics
- Ethnic groups: Machinga

Songo Mnara Island is an island located in Pande Mikoma ward in Kilwa District in Lindi Region of Tanzania's Indian Ocean coast. The island is home to the UNESCO World Heritage Site of Songo Mnara, one of seven world heritage sites in the country. In total, the island covers an area of 8.5 km^{2} (3.3 sq mi), and has an average elevation of 9 m (30 ft). The Island is the ancestral home of the Machinga people.
