= Swahili door =

A Swahili door or Zanzibari door (Swahili Mlango wa Kiswahili) is a door that was developed in the Swahili coast during the Middle Ages and peaked in the 19th century. The door is usually the first and foremost key element of Swahili architecture and was the historically first item that was built before the rest of the home.

== History ==
The oldest Swahili doors are found along with the East African coast from Mozambique Island to the northern coast of Kenya especially in older Swahili cities and towns such as Bagamoyo, Mikindani, Mombasa, Malindi, Lamu, Tanga and Zanzibar. The highest concentration of remaining doors is in Zanzibar City. The largest of doors with the most elaborate of carvings are found in Zanzibar city. The doors were considered a mark of status and prestige for wealthy Swahili merchant families especially in the old sections of Zanzibar attaining impressive dimensions in terms of size and carving details. Further away from the old city center the style and elaboration diminish into much simpler Swahili doors.

The geographical distribution of the door is not limited to the coast especially in Tanzania, the doors can be found in many towns like Tabora, Moshi and Ujiji on the shores of Lake Tanganyika. This transfer was due to the caravan trade routes during the 19th century as the Arab and Swahili merchants established more recent settlements in the Tanzanian interior to facilitate the trade of ivory and enslaved people for the global market taking their doors carving tradition to build the homes of the rich traders. The origins of the door style are considered to be from the Swahili craftsmen and were frequently exported to the mostly treeless Arabian peninsula as a handful of Swahili doors are seen in Muscat, the capital of Oman as Swahili craftsmen were commissioned by Sultan Barghash bin Said of Zanzibar in the 19th century to carve the doors for his palaces.

== Gallery ==
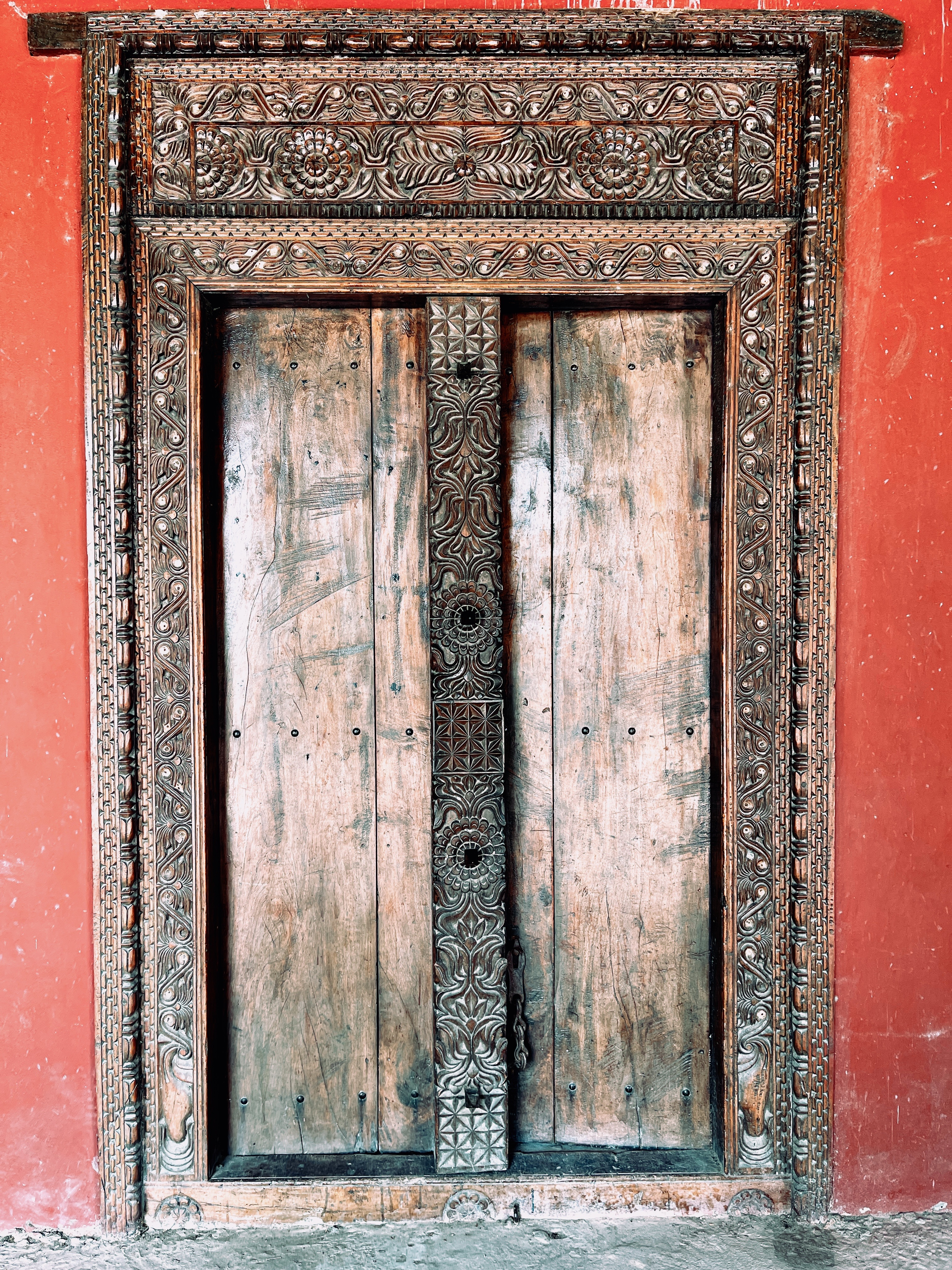
Swahili door in Tabora, Tanzania

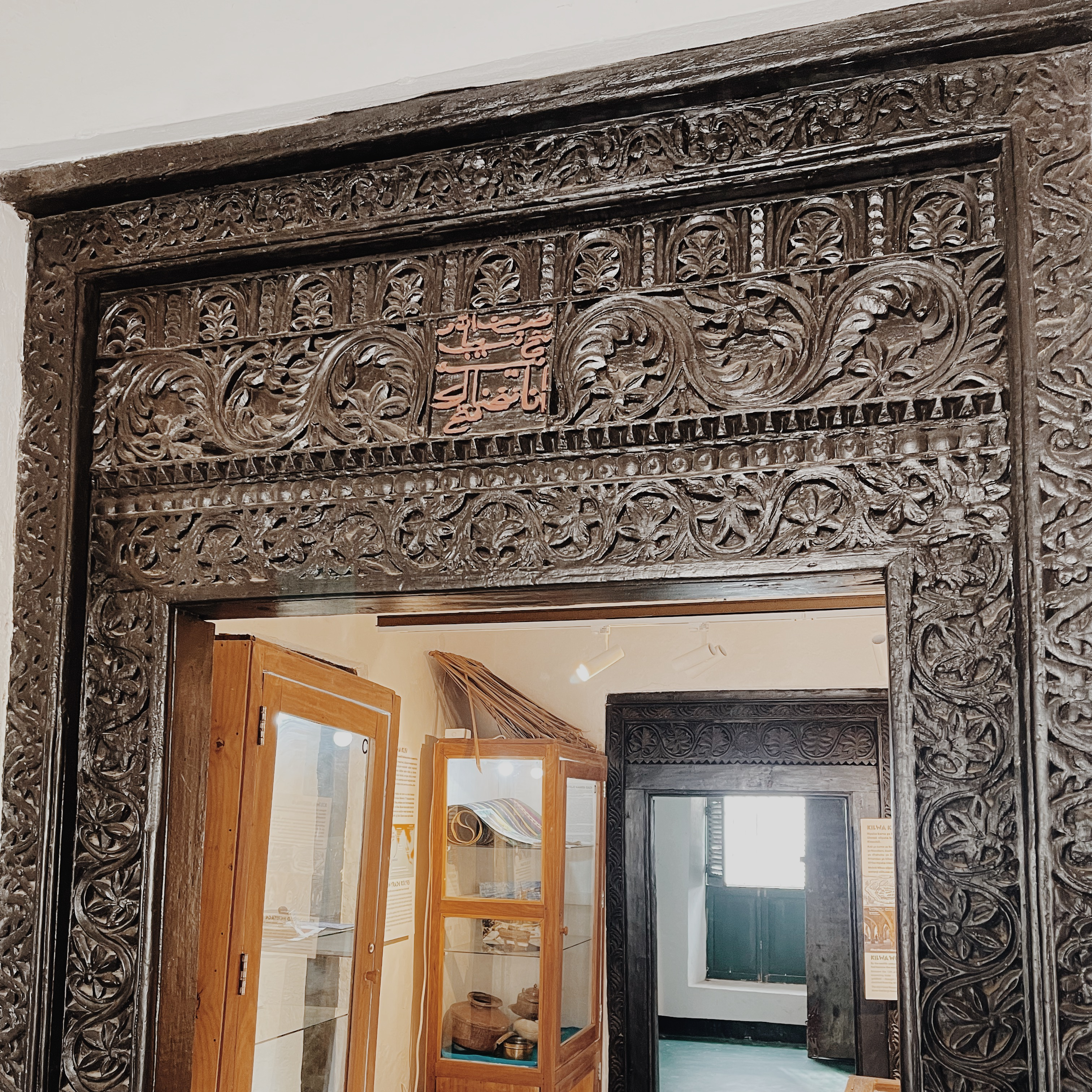
Swahili Door, Mikindani, Tanzania

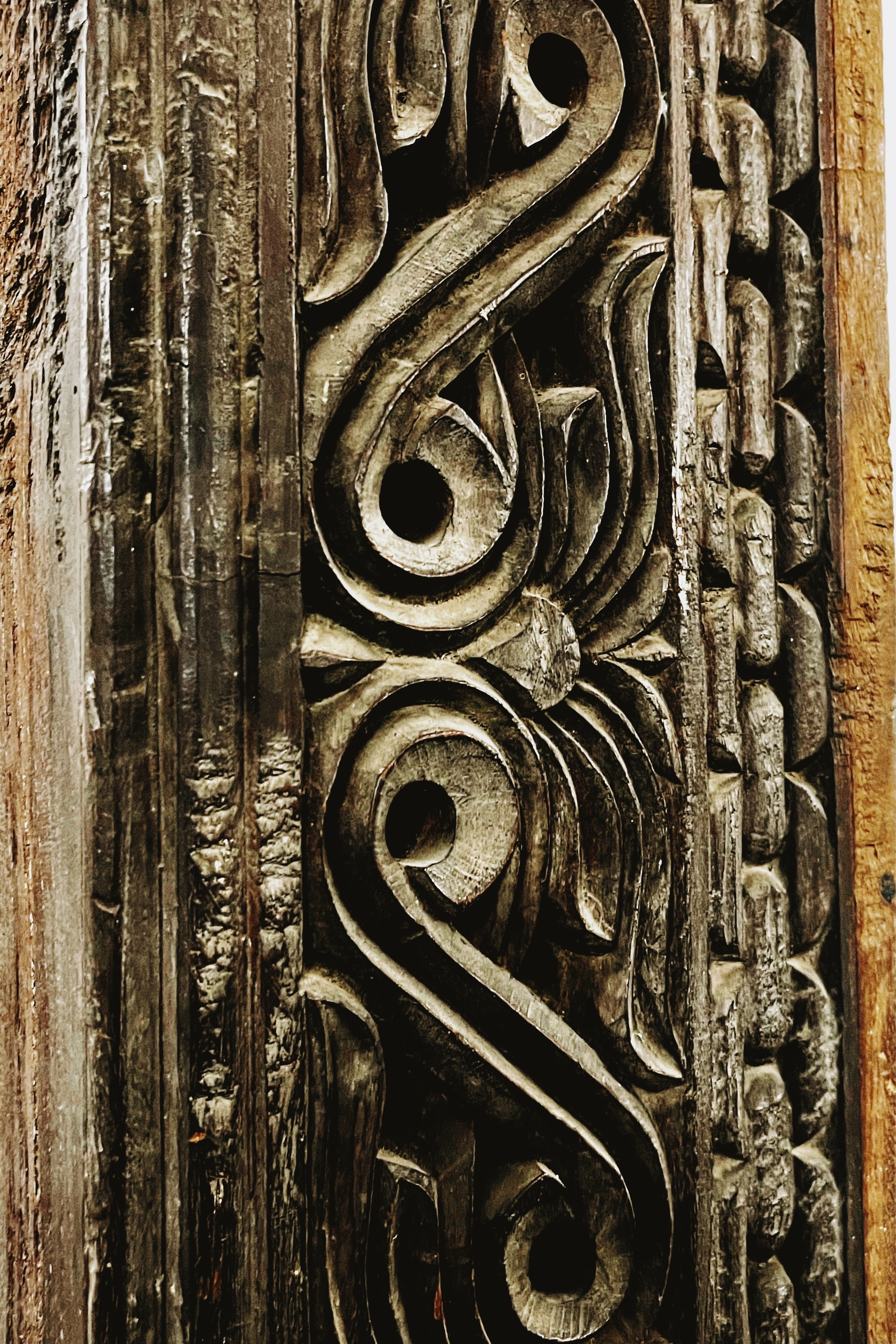
Detail of chain motif on a Swahili door

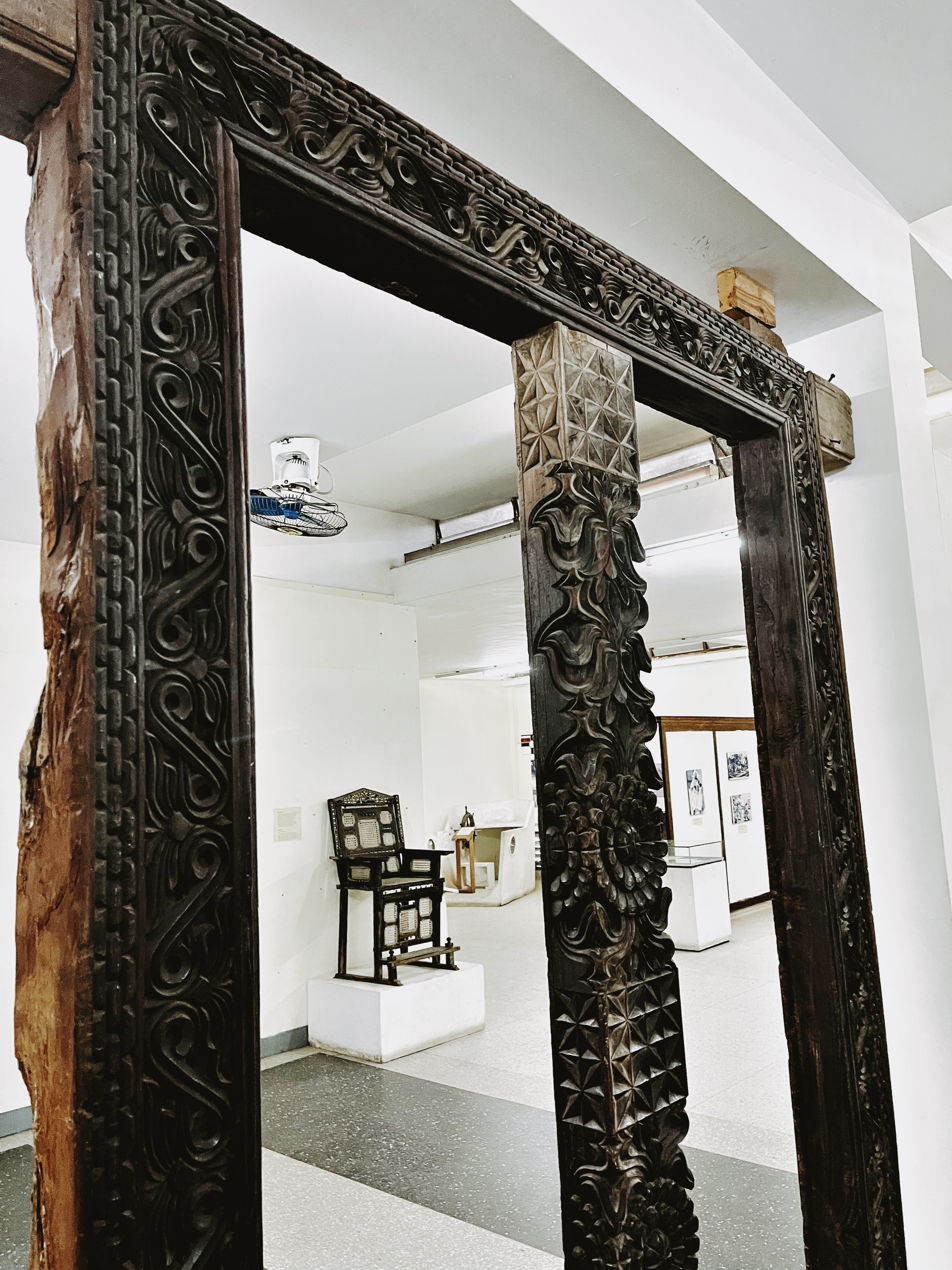
Swahili door in National Museum Tanzania.

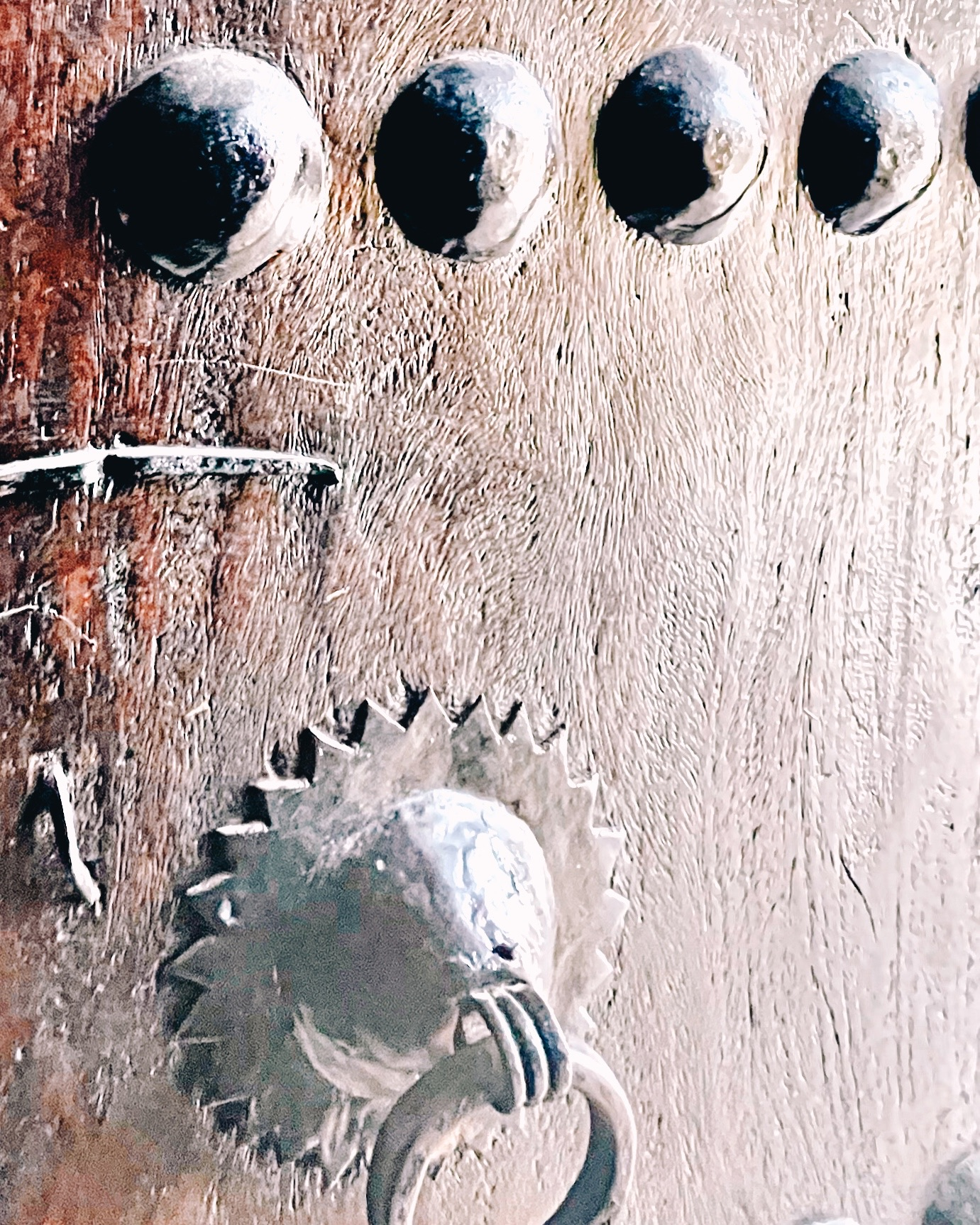
Detail of the iron tiers on Swahili door

== Structure ==
Classic Zanzibari doors are divided into seven basic elements. The frame is divided into two vertical side posts with a heavy lintel on the top. Two panels make the doors with a large vertical center post attached to the doors from the lintel to the threshold. The threshold is a heavy beam 15 to 20 centimeters from the floor located on the base of the structure. The parts with the most decorative features are the door frame and lintel. The doors themselves are not carved, instead, they are horizontally studded with metal tiers usually made of Brass or cast iron that are seven centimeters long. These ties are placed with six or eight on each side of the door often projected from scalloped brass bases. Sometimes these tiers are added to the center post however, these tend to be much larger than the ones on the door panels. The wood used to carve the most expensive doors has been imported teak.

Classical doors were made from African ebony, however, more recently doors have been carved from mango and jackfruit wood. The Swahili designs of the doorframes and carved motifs are divided into two types; the classic rectangular frames and the later ones in the 19th century were distinguished with arched lintels. The classic style has more geometric and is considered to have more pre-Islamic forms. the motifs in the classical style are usually the frankincense tree, lotus, rosette, chain, date palm, and fish. In classic doors, the rosettes motif is usually placed in the center post and intervals across the lintel. The chain ornaments are placed in the outer or inner-frame. The fish motif is almost always on the base of each of the sideposts. The classic design often employs deep cuts to accentuate the moving sun during the day. The center of lintel in both the rectangular and arched style usually has an Arabic inscription. There is a quote from the passage of the Koran, the date of completion of the door, or the owner's initial and/or name.

Each Swahili door had a different name the right side was called mlango dume meaning male door and the left door was called mlango jike meaning female door. The arched doors appear in the 19th century and have more curvilinear floral and foliate patterns showcasing Indian inspiration as more Indian immigrants entered the East African Coast at the time. The Indianized style of doors had more baroque style and rococo replaced the chain with beads on the frame of the doors and the fish became a vase with vines. The lintel is covered with more vine forms however they retain the Swahili open fretwork in the patterns. Today many Zanzibar doors blend the classic style and the Indianized styles interchangeably mixing styles in the different parts of the door.

== See also ==
- Swahili architecture
