= Songo Mnara =

World Heritage Site in Tanzania

Songo Mnara Ruins
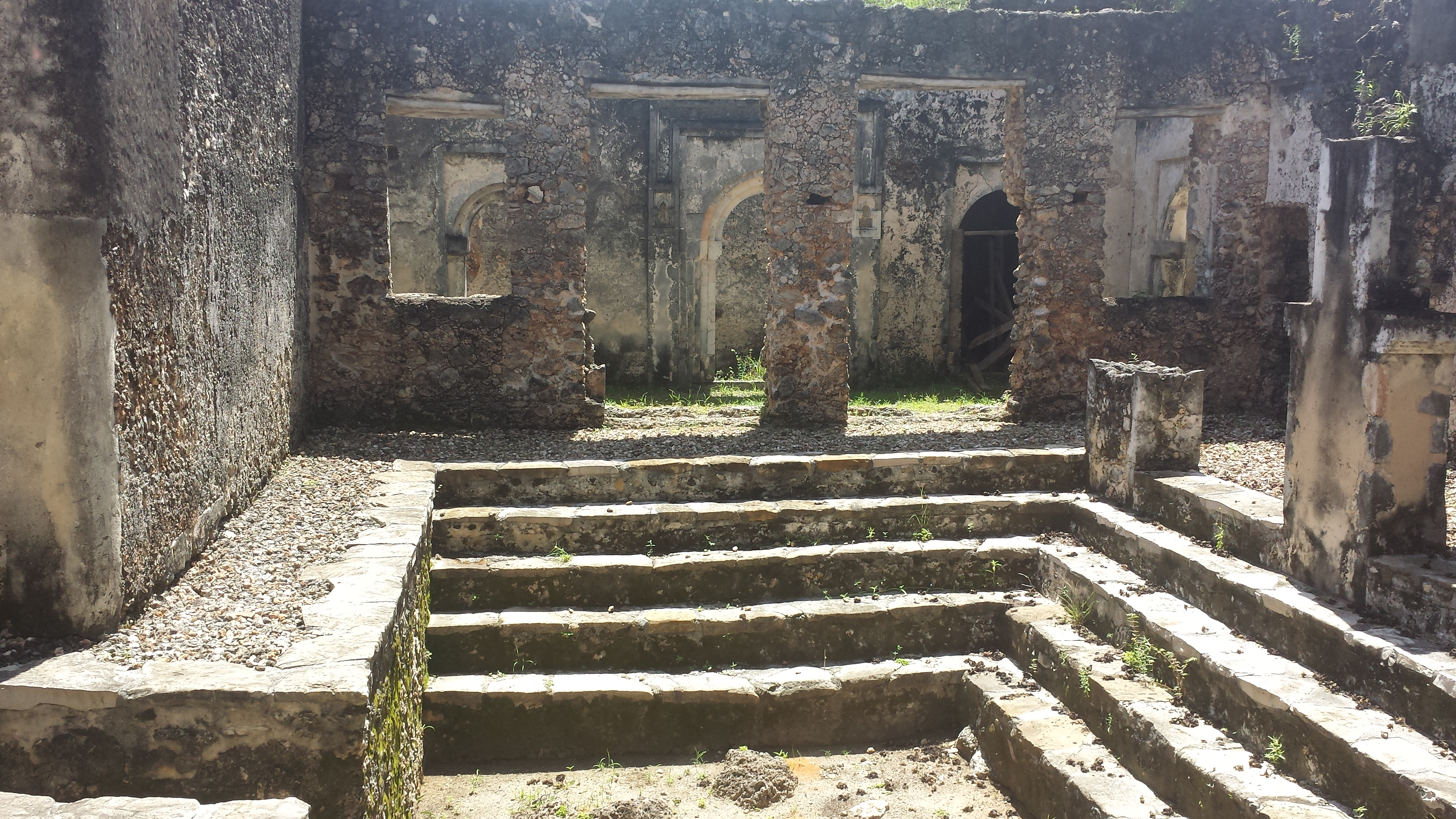
- Inside the Main Building

- Location within Tanzania
- 9°2′58″S 39°34′2″E
- Type: Settlement
- Location: Kilwa District, Lindi Region, Tanzania

History
- Built: 9th century

Site notes
- Architectural style: Swahili architecture
- Governing body: Antiquities Division, Ministry of Natural Resources and Tourism
- Owner: Tanzania Government

UNESCO World Heritage Site
- Official name: Ruins of Kilwa Kisiwani and Ruins of Songo Mnara
- Type: Cultural
- Criteria: iii
- Designated: 1981 (5th session)
- Reference no.: 144
- UNESCO Region: Africa
- Endangered: 2004–2014

National Historic Sites of Tanzania
- Official name: Songo Mnara Ruins
- Type: Cultural

Songo Mnara is a historic Swahiili settlement located in Songo Mnara Island in Pande Mikoma, Kilwa District in Lindi Region of Tanzania. The island is home to a Medieval Swahili stone town. The stone town was occupied from the 14th to 16th centuries. Songo Mnara has been recognized as a UNESCO World Heritage Site, along with the nearby stone town Kilwa Kisiwani. In total, archaeologists have found six mosques, four cemeteries, and two dozen house blocks along with three enclosed open spaces on the island. Songo Mnara was constructed from rough-coral and mortar. This stonetown was built as one of many trade towns on the Indian Ocean. The site is a registered National Historic Site.

== Layout of Swahili Towns ==
Archaeologists have been analyzing the layout of stone towns on the Swahili coast, mainly focusing on the relationship of the mosques and houses, in order to understand the role of the Swahili coast in Islamic culture, the functions of specific towns, and the complex economic and ritual process of land ownership. Open spaces in towns were used for both functional purposes for social organization. Cemeteries are found both inside and outside the town walls. The layout of Songo Mnara is typical of stone towns along the Swahili coast, though its wall is a unique feature.

== Excavations ==
Excavations have helped archaeologists to better understand ways of life at Songo Mnara. Many different areas have been excavated, including several of the more than 40 houses found surrounding the stone town. Trenches were dug in House 44, House 23 outside the houses, by a tomb, and a well. Many different types of artifacts have been found, although few were recovered from within the excavated houses. Archaeologists carefully mapped and recorded their finds.

House 44 was an important area of research because of the complexity of the rooms and the fact that it was an individual's house. This house had excavations in each room, each trench having a different number. There was a 1 x1 m test unit on the southwest room, dug slowly because of the layers of ceramics. This excavation stopped when they hit the level of plaster underneath the floor. There was another located on the south-west side of the house which was approximately 4 x 2.25m. There were also ceramics found in this room. The next room was in the center of the house, where they found plaster and coral among the layers of rubble. In this room, they stopped excavations at the plaster floor. There were also excavations done at entrance room, southeastern room, and the back room of the house. The ceramics found at house 44 were from the 15th century.

House 23 is located in the southwestern corner of Songo Mnara. Due to time constraints, this house only had samples taken from it instead of excavating it completely. A 4 x 1m unit was put in the courtyard of the house. During excavations, steps were uncovered, along with floor made out of coral bedrock. The next room was a central room which had a 2 x 2m unit placed. There was no plaster floor like what was found at House 44.

Houses 31, 40, and 34 were excavated during the 2011 field school at Songo Mnara. Preliminary research was done during a field school in 2009. There were six areas within the house that the archaeologists did during the 2009 excavations of the houses at Songo Mnara. Once again plaster floors were found at each house and artifacts were present. Ceramics were found at one of the front entrances tested to be showing a lot of activity. The back room that was tested did not show the activity the front rooms did because they were too tidy compared to the front room. During this field school, Kilwa-type coins were found under the floor. All the information found at these houses showed not only was the open space shared, but the houses were also shared at the site.

During the 2009 field school, there were excavations done on the open spaces of Songo Mnara. All the activity is laid out by the structures that make the private space separate from the public space. When looking at it archaeologically, there is an abundance of activity found in layers of ceramics and other artifacts. Coins were also found in the open areas, thinking of all the open areas that are there as open areas are used for activities that area found normally to be outside. For the 2011 field school at Songo Mnara, the open area was also looked at by shovel test pits, this time looking at what the soil could tell a person about the site. There were also trenches dug, showing from the artifacts that the areas were related to household activities.

During the 2011 field school, mosques were looked at, unlike in the 2009 field school at Songo Mnara. The central mosque was looked at to understand Songo Mnara. Looking at the tombs, it was obvious people cared for those who were buried after they were first buried.

A 2023 study by Brielle et al used excavated remains from the archaeological site to analyze DNA patterns as a part of a larger project to track foreign mixture of DNA along the Swahili Coast. Ancient DNA analysis was completed in human remains of 7 Songo Mnara individuals in order to determine the proportions of "African-like, Persian-like, and Indian-like" DNA sequences. However, archaeologists and geneticists were unable to produce solid data for many of the Songo Mnara individuals. Analysis of the DNA showed that at least 1 Songo Mnara individual fitting within a 3-region Indian, Persian, and ancient African DNA model. Enough DNA evidence was available that was indicative of Persian ancestry. However, a larger number of samples and "higher quality data" would have increased the amount of conclusions able to be drawn from this site.

The introduction of foreign DNA was estimated to have occurred between 708-1219 AD. However, the authors indicate that this likely occurred over "multiple generations" and that mixture of Eurasian and African populations has continually occurred since. These results are consistent to the histories told through the Kilwa Chronicle.

== Geoarchaeology ==
Songo Mnara is an island built atop bedrock and sandy subsoil. Its proximity to the epicenter of Kilwa Kisiwani and its limited occupation make it a favorable area for geoarchaeological research. In 2011 soil samples from Songo Mnara were taken, and geoarchaeologists conducted microstratigraphy chemical and phytolith analyses to differentiate what matter was deposited naturally versus what was deposited by human residents. Two open spaces were tested: one at the north end of Songo Mnara, and one at the south end. Samples were also taken from rooms that contained fill, and from the floors of the houses. In samples from house 44 a great number of palm phytoliths were found, which is not a natural occurrence.

== Public spaces ==
The research done at Songo Mnara's public space is to see how urban centers can help us understand layouts of cities. Within the wall around the town, there is a great deal of space that does not have any architecture, and a public space. Both graveyards and mosques are also considered a public space. Archaeological testing, phytoliths and micromorphology techniques, are a new way of looking at public space. Seven different locations were looked at when doing this research: the western shoreline and areas associated with wattle and daub housing. These areas hold a large variety of artifacts associated with houses within the open space. When looking at the geochemical data, it was found there was a large amount of human activity in the areas of the western shore and areas associated with the wattle and daub houses. Location three looked at space looking at the public spaces and the cemetery/mosque space. During testing of this area, Iron tools were uncovered in primary context, showing there was iron smithing at Songo Mnara. Location four is graves and tombs in the central area, showing the people memorialized the people who were buried there. For memorializing those buried, there were Kilwa coins in remembrance of the loved one buried there. There were ceramic shards found, which would have been used for offering in remembrance of the buried. Location five is the mosque and graveyard. This section was looked at for how the markers were laid out, along with where the mosques were positioned. The geophysical looked at the soil being good for the burial, and no grave goods were uncovered. The sixth location is the public well area, showing this location is the most private place out of all the areas. There was also a midden when doing excavations around the well with a variety of artifacts. The last place looked at is the northern public space, showing with the phytolith research that there were possible garden plots or orchards in the area. During excavations, a variety of domestic and household items were found in this area because it was so close to the houses. In looking at public spaces at Mnara, there were three different areas of public spaces: organized centers, green space and areas of non-elite members’ areas.

== Houses as public spaces ==
Researchers have studied the layout of house 44. The back rooms contained artifacts, but the entrance room only contained traces of palm phytoliths in its soil sample. Each back room showed signs of different activity compare with the open space. Excavations of many other houses follow some of what was seen in house 44. The entrance room in house 31 and a central room in house 23 were different from their corresponding rooms in house 44, partly because house 23 is grander than house 44. The artifacts discovered in each room of each house suggested a different activity. Coins within the middens (refuse heaps) along with burials inside the back room suggest the house was not private, but a public space to do business. This is different from how Swahili coastal houses have been researched in the past. The evidence suggests that what played out within a city of trade is showing up in the houses that people live in. This shows there is not always a defined way to determine what is a public space and what is a private space.

== Kilwa type coins ==
The coins date from the 11th to 16th centuries. More coins were legible than coins that were not. They were uncovered by excavation trenches across Songo Mnara, mostly in the floor layers. Nāsir al-Dunya, ‘Ali b. al-Hasan, and al-Hasan b. Sulaimān were the types found on the site. The Nāsir al-Dunya was not easy to read due to poor preservation. ‘Ali b. al-Hasan markings make up most of the types of Kilwa coins at Songo Mnara. Coins could have been left on the surface from other people, as they predate when the site was occupied, due to dates earlier than occupation of the location.

== Trade ==
Trade on the Swahili coast ranged from China, India and other countries who dealt with trade on the Indian Ocean. When looking at who traded with Songo Mnara, there was evidence of ceramic shards from China and southeast Asia. The Chinese ceramics were blue-and-white porcelain, green-glazed stoneware dating from the 14th century. The Southeast Asian pieces were unglazed and green-glazed stoneware from Thi. Only a small amount of imported goods were found due to the agriculture that was carried out at the site. The ceramics found at Songo Mnara were exchange goods.

== Documentation with 3D Laser Scanning ==
Between 2005 and 2009, the Zamani Project documented some of the Swahili ruins on Songo Mnara with terrestrial 3D laser scanning. Structures documented on Songo Mnara include: The palace, the mosque and a number of residential buildings. Some of the textured 3D models, panorama tours, elevations, sections and plans are available on www.zamaniproject.org.

== Gallery ==
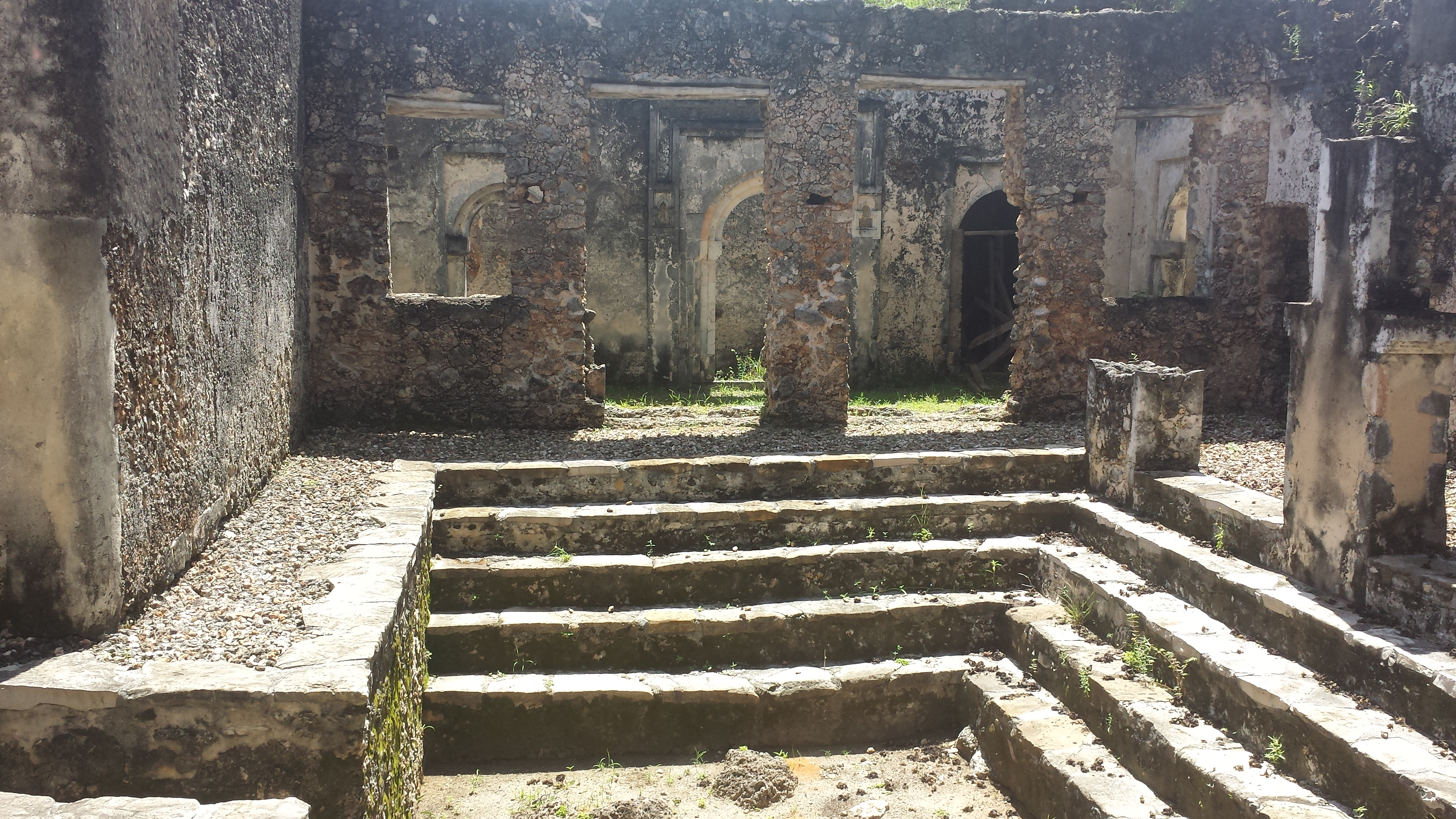

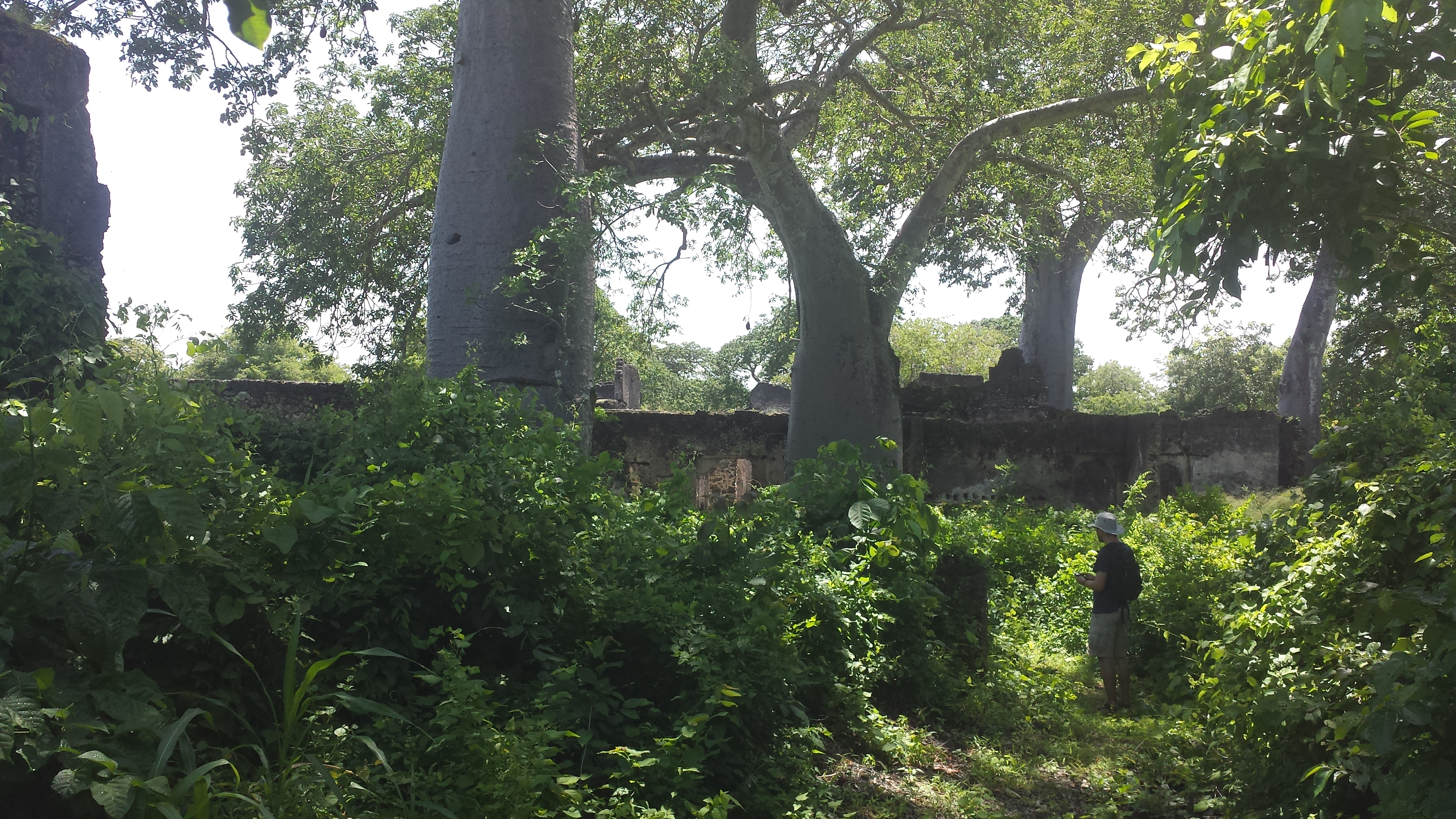

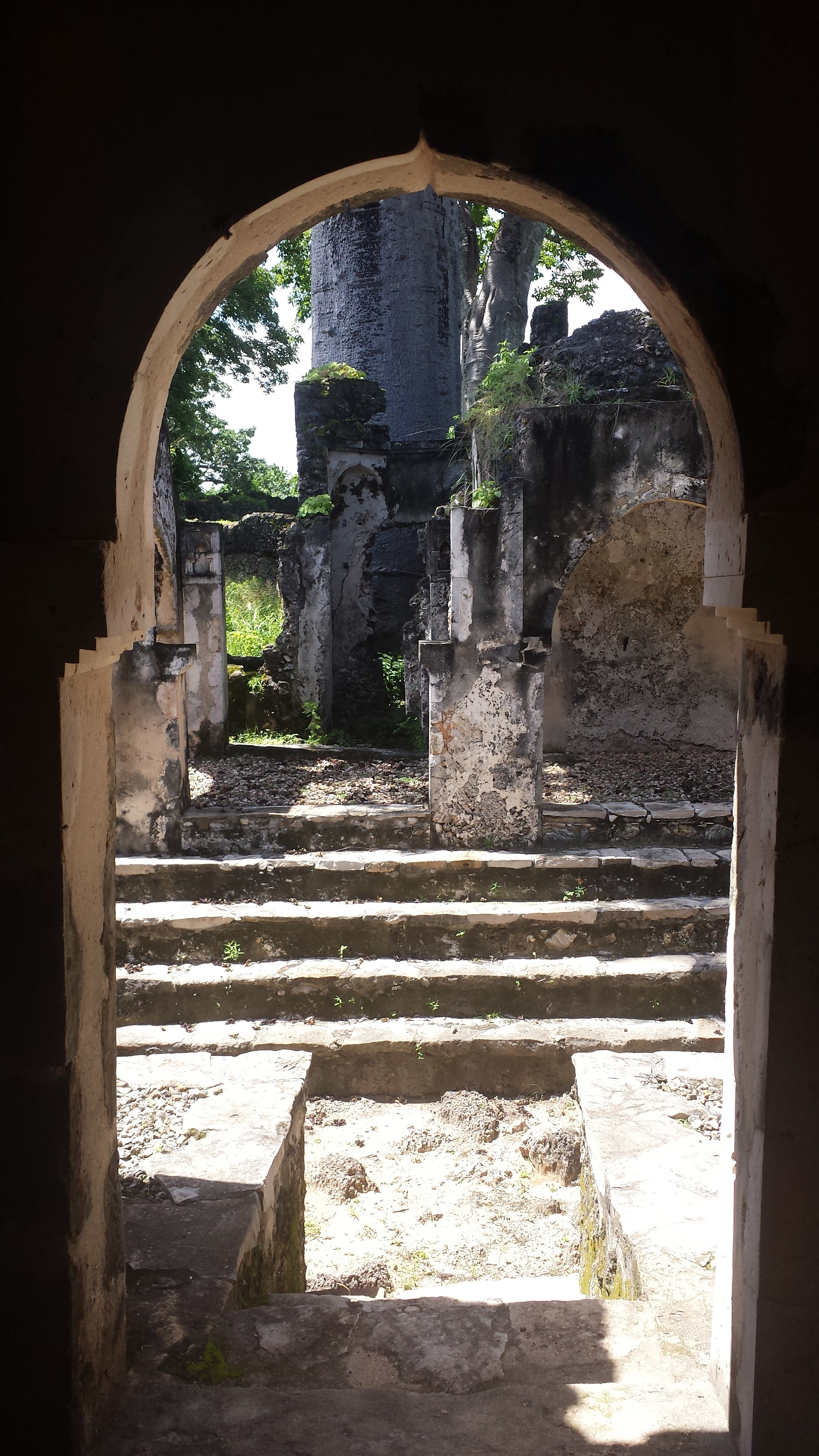

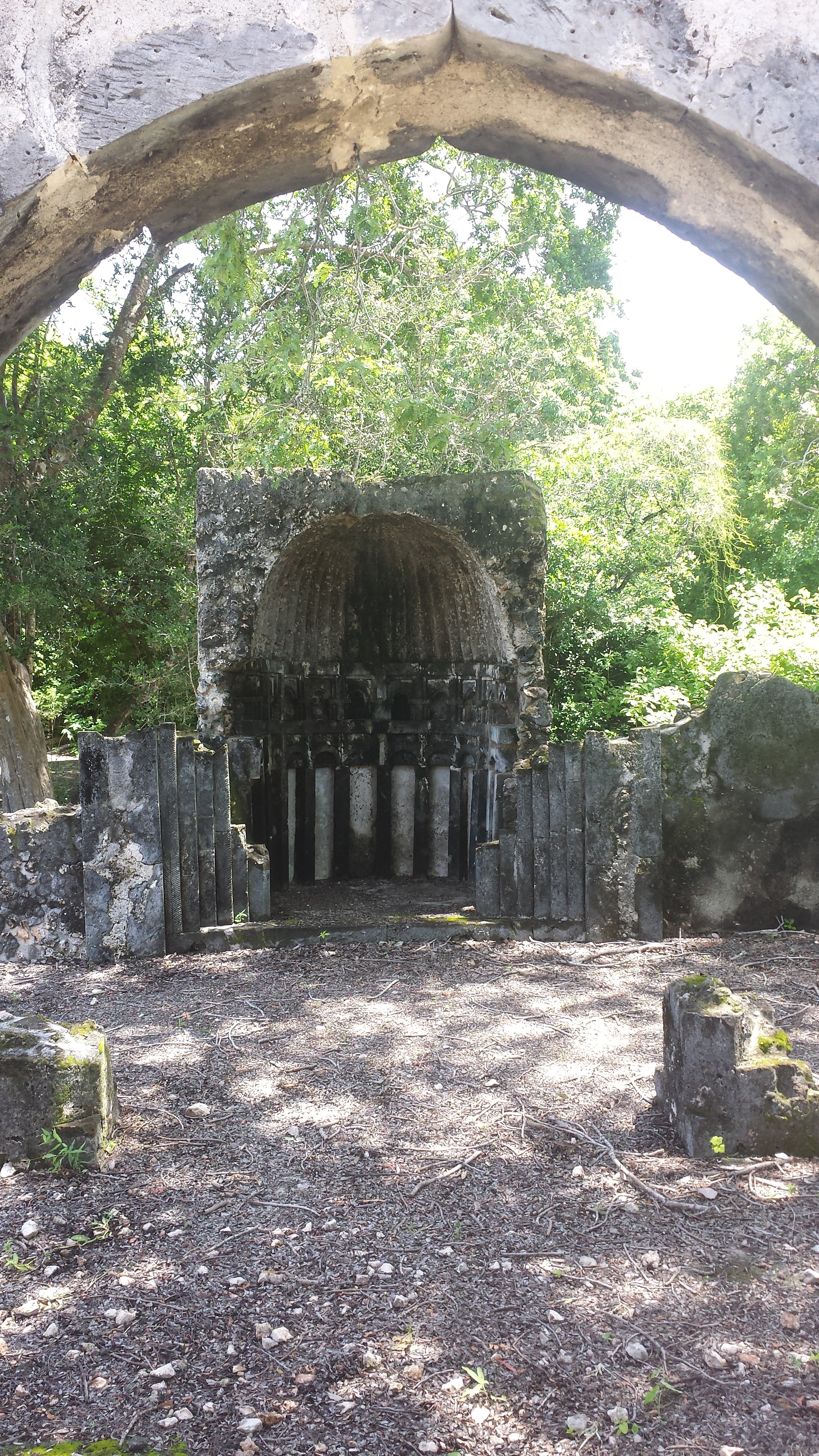

== See also ==
- Historic Swahili Settlements
