= Swahili architecture =

Building traditions of the eastern and southeastern coasts of Africa

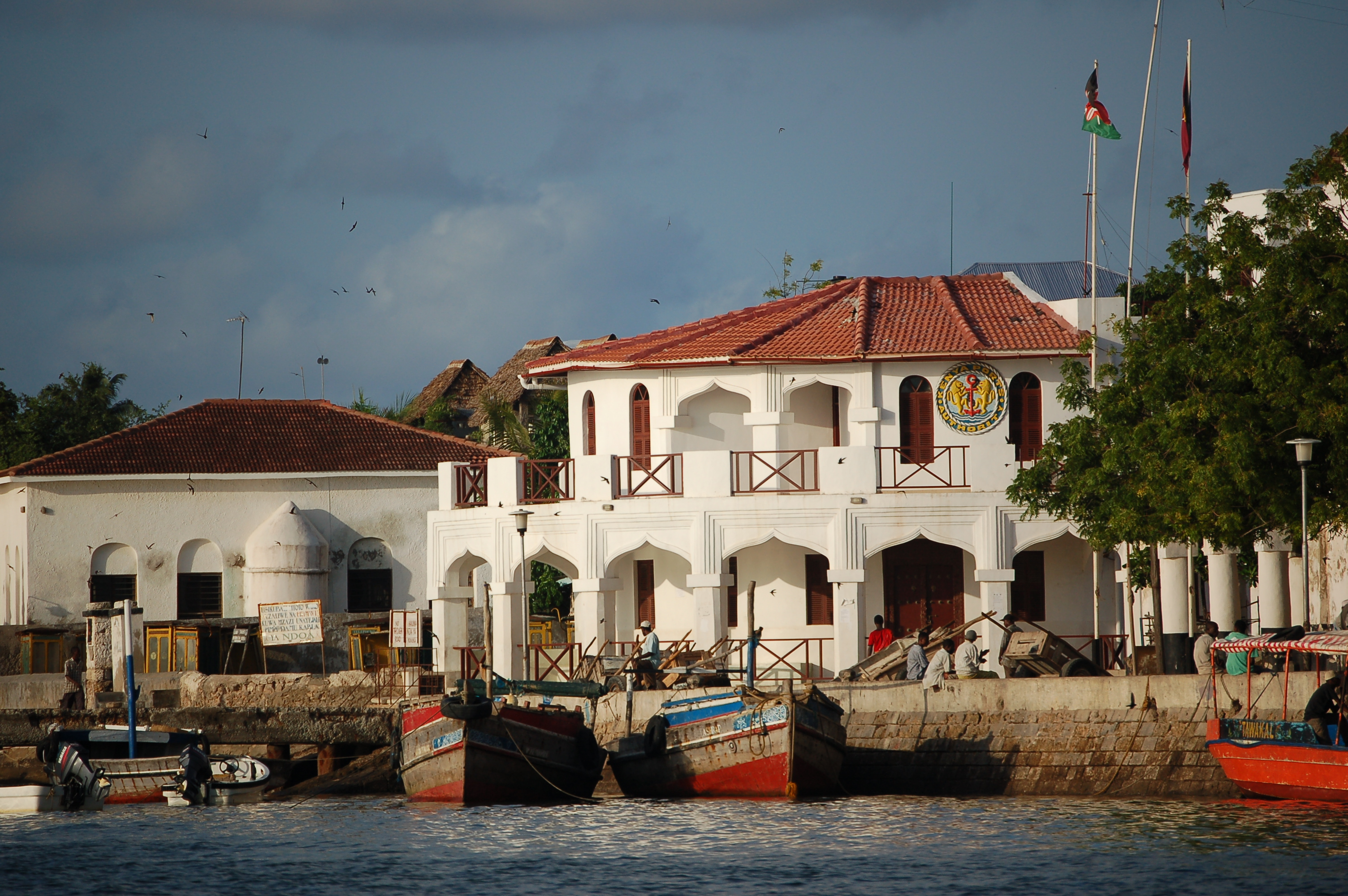
Lamu town waterfront in Kenya, one of the best-preserved Swahili settlements

Swahili architecture is a term used to designate a whole range of diverse building traditions practiced or once practiced along the eastern and southeastern coasts of Africa. Rather than simple derivatives of Islamic architecture from the Arabic world, Swahili stone architecture is a distinct local product as a result of evolving social and religious traditions, environmental changes, and urban development.

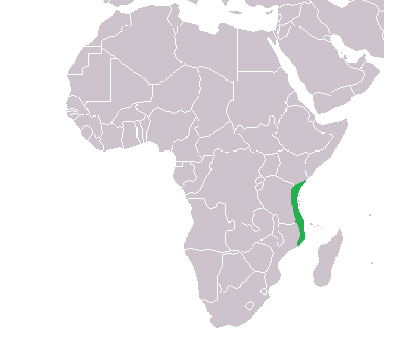
Swahili Coast

What is today seen as typically Swahili architecture is still very visible in the thriving urban centers of Mombasa, Lamu and Malindi in Kenya and Songo Mnara, Kilwa Kisiwani, and Zanzibar in Tanzania. The distribution of Swahili architecture and towns provides important clues about trade relationships among different regions and societal systems. Many of the classic mansions and palaces of the Swahili coast belonged to wealthy merchants and landowners, who played a key role in the mercantile economy of the Swahili coast. Swahili architecture exhibits a range of innovations, influences, and diverse forms. History interlocks and overlaps, resulting in densely layered structures that cannot be broken down into distinct stylistic parts. Many spectacular ruins of the so-called golden age of Swahili architecture may still be observed near the southern Kenyan port of Malindi in the ruins of Gedi (the lost city of Gede/Gedi).

== Key elements ==
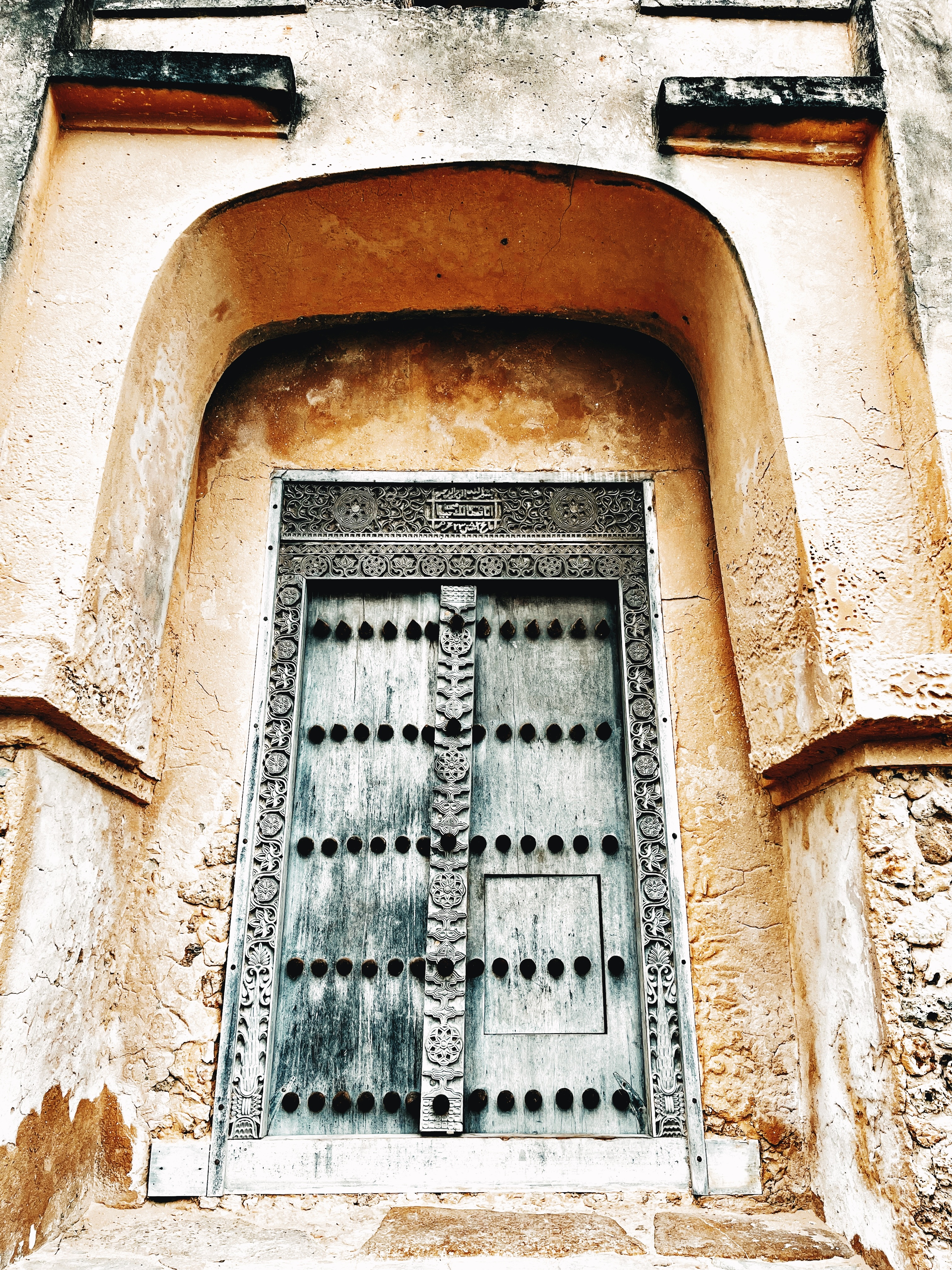
Swahili door in Kilwa Island, Tanzania

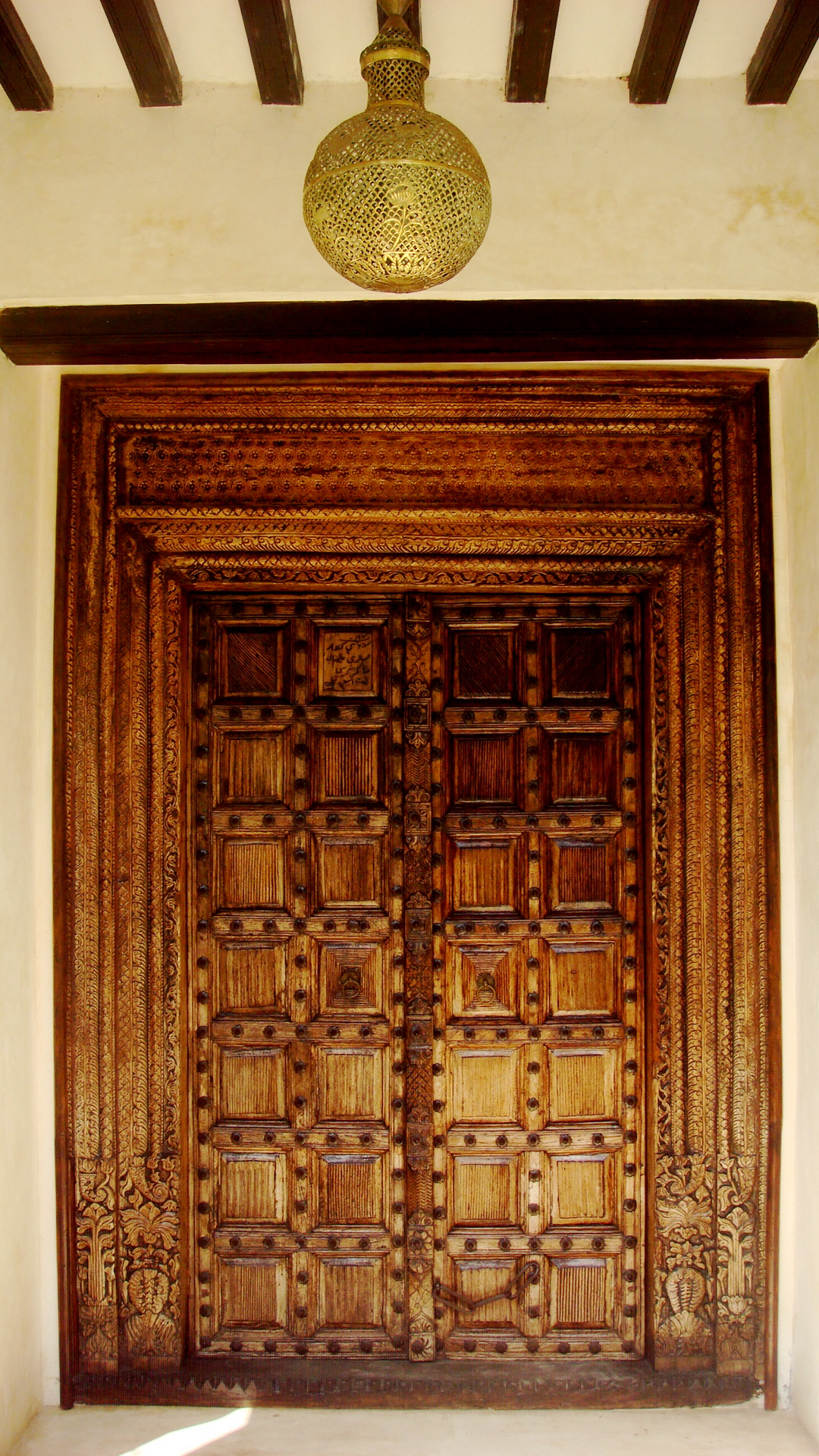
Wood-carven door in Lamu Town

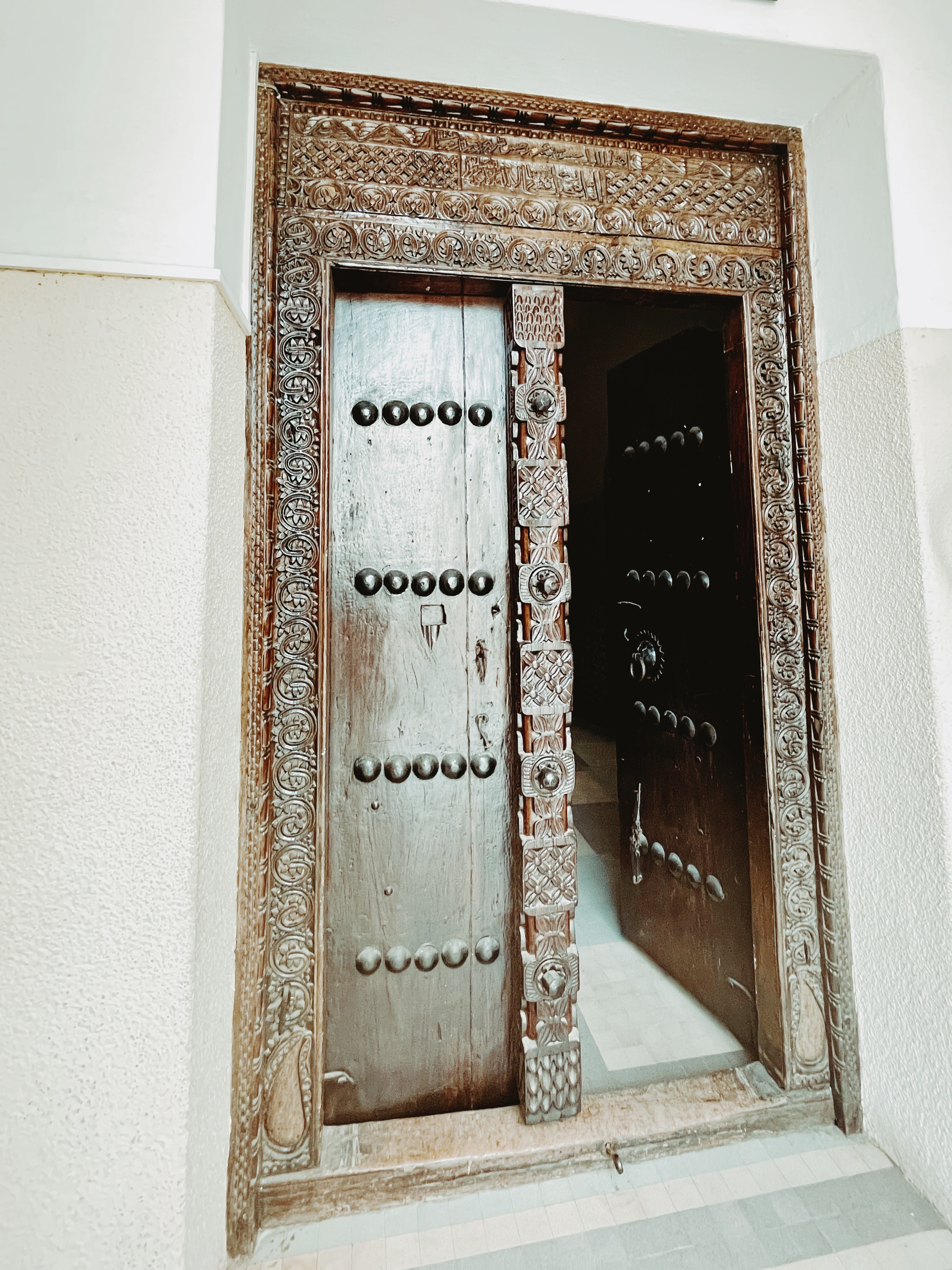
Swahili door at the entrance of the National Museum of Tanzania

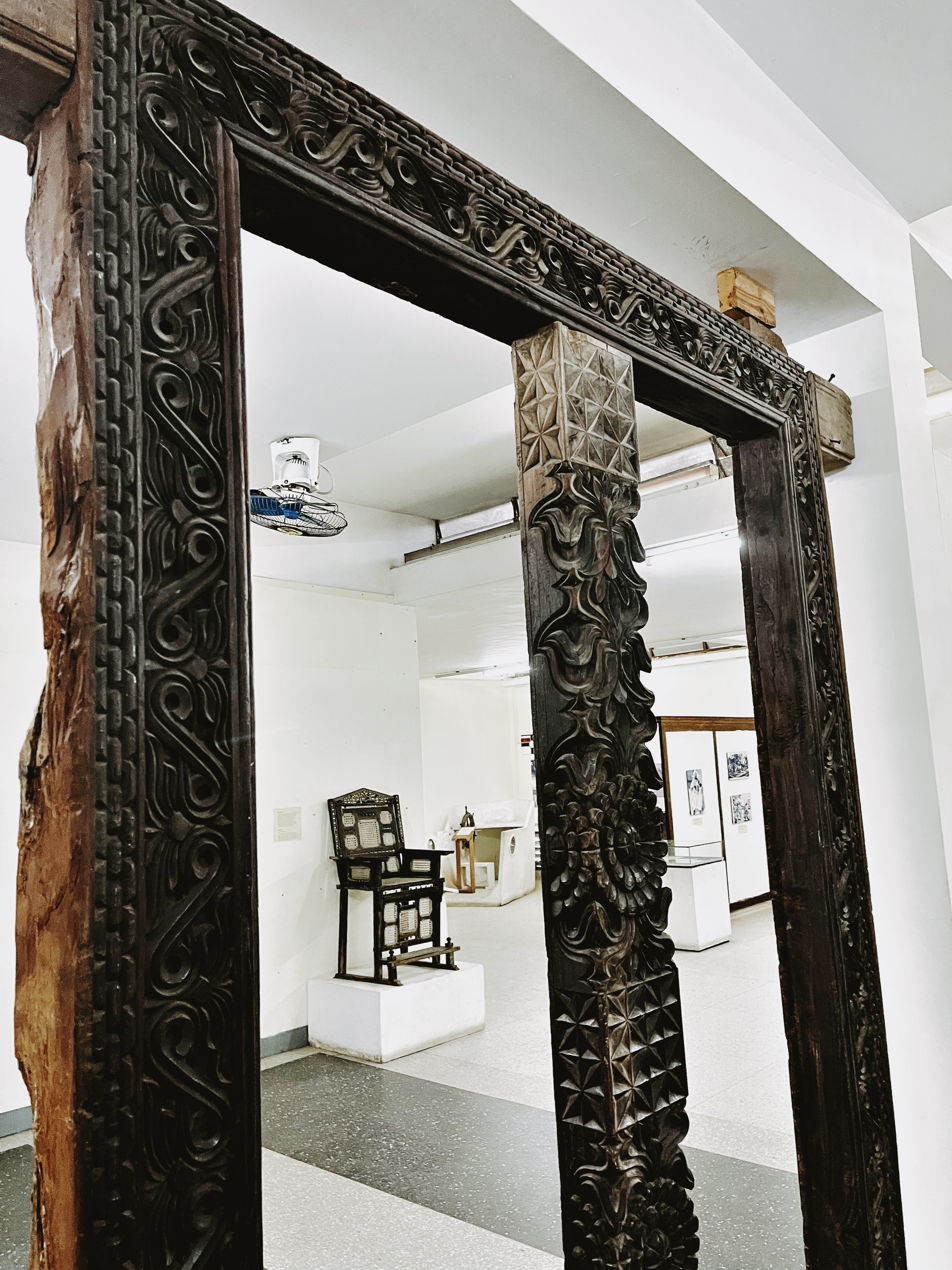
A historic Swahili door on display at the National Museum of Tanzania.

Along the coast of East Africa, one can find many stone monuments built by the Swahili, including houses, pillar tombs, and mosques. The materiality of local corallimestone marks the signature building language of Swahili architecture and provides a functional response towards both human needs and the physical environment. Other raw materials, including coral rag and mangrove poles are commonly used to elaborate stone buildings. The decorative designs on the building façade are influenced from a mix of cultures from mainland Africa and inspiration from Arabia and Indian immigrants. Various designs on roofs and windows serve to protect buildings from dramatic monsoon seasons.

The most distinguished local features of Swahili architecture is Swahili doors. The designs and motifs of doorframes can be categorized into two types. Rectangular frames represent an older Swahili style with straight lintels, while arched lintels were more prevalent in the later nineteenth century. The center of the lintel often carries a carved Arabic inscription, such as a quote from the Quran or information of the householder. Therefore, doors usually serve as an important indicator to enhance and signify the social status of the householder.

On the urban level, Swahili towns are organized through sections called mitaa, divided by city walls. In Swahili, mitaa are imaginary and symbolic districts with which local inhabitants associate their social identities. Each mitaa is centralized around a mosque. The social status of each mitaa can be reflected through the types of buildings and activities revealed through archeological excavations.

Within the internal structure, a typical Swahili house is designed around a self-contained central courtyard. Privacy of domestic life is valued, as the owners’ living space is separated from the public space. An inner porch is oriented towards a blank wall that blocks the view of the inner courtyard. Courtyards also actively cool down the building internally.

== Lamu, Kenya ==
Lamu is the oldest living town on eastern coast of Kenya and one of the best well-preserved archeological sites of Swahili architecture. It is the headquarters of Lamu County and a UNESCO World Heritage Site. Once a trading center of East Africa, Lamu is ethnically diverse, with a majority population of Muslims. The well-known former Swahili city states in the Lamu archipelago are Lamu, Sheila, Patte, Manda and Siyu.

=== Lamu Town ===
The town of Lamu and houses are oriented to the north, facing the Kaaba in Mecca. This orientation is a result of religion, since the founders and most inhabitants of Lamu were Muslims. Lamu Town is divided into mitaa include Mkomani, Langoni, Gardeni, Kashmiri and Bombay.

- Mkomani is what is now known as the Stone town of Lamu. The historic buildings constructed in stone still exist today. The inhabitants of Mkomani consider themselves as the founders, elite and ruling class of Lamu. They associate themselves with more 'Arab-ness' than 'African-ness'.
- Langoni is located in the south of Lamu and is where “newcomers” or “strangers” reside. The houses are mainly constructed of mud and thatch. The houses were reconstructed with coral stone blocks and corrugated iron sheets after a major fire in 1982.
- Gardeni is the area towards the west side of the sand dune on which Lamu stands.
- Kashmiri and Bombay are newer and growing towns in southern Lamu.

==== Mosques ====
The mosques in Lamu look very much like houses, as they have no distinguishable features like minarets or domes. The architectural composition of a mosque in Lamu includes the Musalla, the Mihrab, the Mimbar. One of the most significant mosques in Lamu is Riyadha Mosque, built in 1990 by Habib Salih. It hosts the biggest Mawlid in Lamu, the celebration of the birthday of Prophet Mohamed.

=== Shanga settlement, Pate Island ===
Locating on the south side of Pate Island near Lamu and dating from the mid-8th century CE, Shanga is an ancient Swahili settlement built of mud and thatch. The Swahili community in Shanga continued to thrive there for 600 years until their disappearance in the early 15th century. The original settlement, established around a depression in the sand-dunes set back 150m from the sea, was a central enclosure around a well. The well remained the same location over time. An early timber mosque was built upon the central enclosure, serving as a communal gathering space. Stone building was introduced in the early to mid-tenth century, through using a technology that cuts porites coral from the sea bed. The new stone mosque can accommodate the majority of male adult population at prayer. Around the Mosque are the first stone tombs, built of faced coral and plaster.

According to archeologist Mark Horton, "all the surviving stone houses at Shanga are of a single storey with walls of coral rag and lime between 0.38 m and 0.45 m thick. Walls lie in a shallow foundation trench never deeper than 0.4 m." Excavated archeological artifacts indicate the specialization of textile working, weaving, and leather working. The town of Shanga is organized in mitaa (or deme, in Horton's words), reflecting the classification of social identities.

- Deme A: Located north, for agriculturalists with ironworking elements. Very few stone buildings are present, while iron slag and furnaces are found.
- Deme B: Located east, for pastoralists. Major areas are large stone enclosures (probably for the keeping of cattle, with accumulations of dung) and multi-room houses.
- Deme C: Located south, for maritime traders. Uniform stone houses are present, with minimum concentration of guest rooms. This group lies on the seaward side of the settlement.
- Deme D: Located west, for craftsman. They are mostly stone houses of non-standard plan, suggesting modification of workshops. The site is concentrated with bead-making equipment, spindle whorls as well as tanning pits.

== Mombasa, Kenya ==
Old Town Mombasa is a coastal city in southeast Kenya along the Indian Ocean. With various influences from different communities like the Omanis, Arabs, Portuguese and Indians, Mombasa is drastically losing its identity as a Swahili Town.

The traditional Swahili architecture in Mombasa exhibits unique strategies on both building and urban scales, as a response to the challenging climate of monsoon seasons. Important building elements include doorways with arched openings, wooden shutter windows half open for daylight, extending balconies, and barazas (low stone / concrete bench) attached to the main building façade. All the windows and openings are strategically placed to maximize ventilation. Internal courtyards serve to cool down the internal structure.

Most Swahili architecture in Mombasa are built of coral stones, which are readily available along the coast and have a low embodied energy. White washed facades ensure that excessive heat is reflected.

== Malindi, Kenya ==
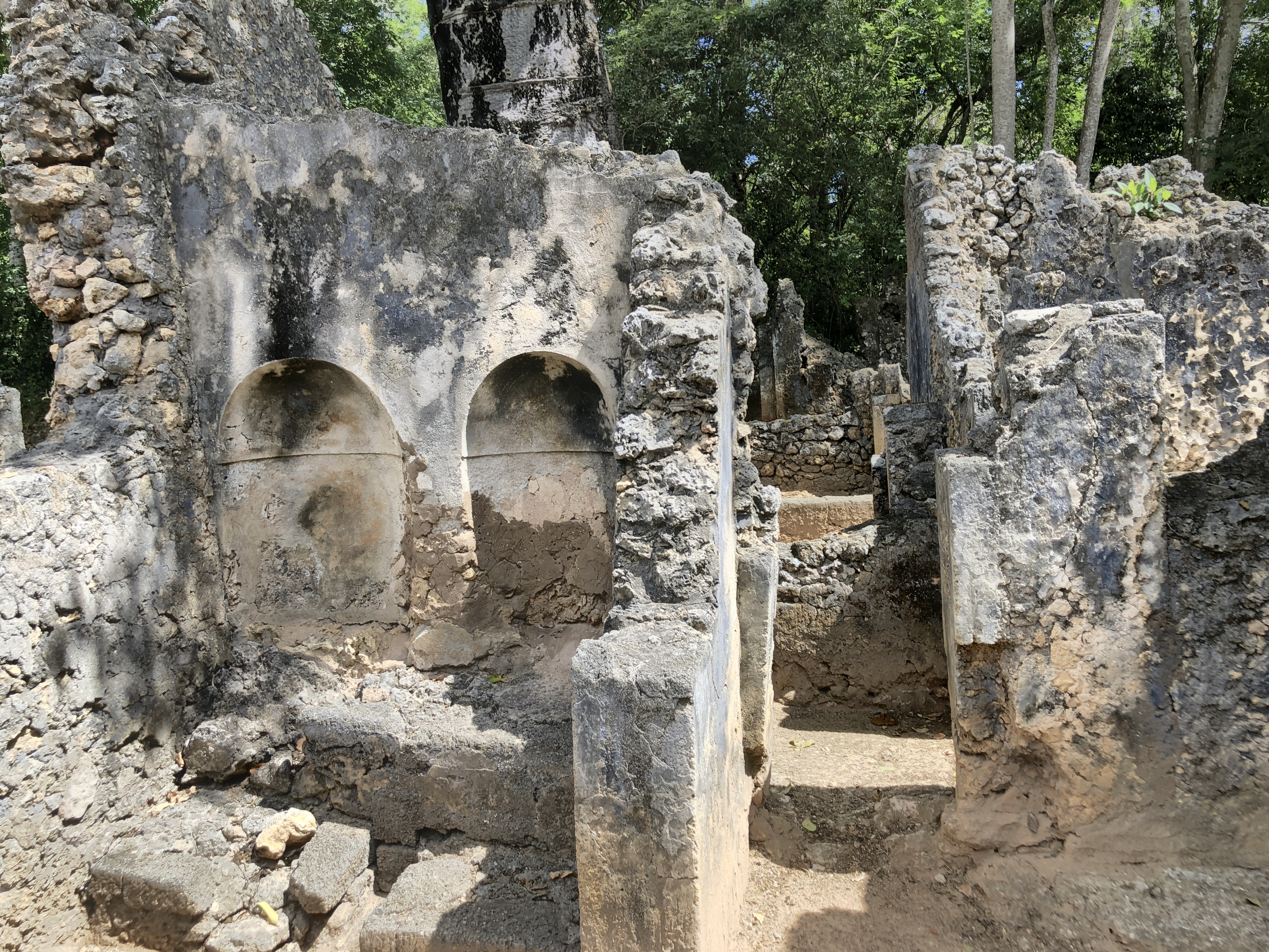
Ruins of Gedi

Malindi, an area that includes Malindi Old Town, the Gede (or Gedi) Ruin, the Mambrui site, and some other settlements, is an important site of Swahili architecture in east Kenya. The site of Gedi includes a walled town and its outlying area. Similar to other Swahili towns, all architectures of Malindi, including mosques, a palace, and houses, are constructed in stones. Earth and thatch houses are distributed in open areas in the settlement. Stone “pillar tombs” can be found in Gedi.

=== Ruins of Gedi ===
The Gedi ruins make up a site consisting of 45 acres (18 hectares) that lies in the primeval Arabuko-Sokoke Forest. It traces its origin in the twelfth century, but was rebuilt with new town walls in the fifteenth and sixteenth centuries. The town of Gedi is divided by two walls, with an outer wall enclosing 45 acres (18 hectares) and an inner wall enclosing 18 acres (7.3 hectares). Both walls were nine feet high and eighteen inches sick, built stone and coated in plaster. Instead of serving as defensive fortifications, the walls are mainly interpreted as social barriers within the ancient town. Within the inner wall there are two mosques, a palace or Sheikh's house, four large houses, several clustered houses, and four large pillar tombs comprising the urban core. Gedi’s city planning appears to be organized in a grid pattern.

- The mosques at Gedi contained wells and washing facilities, but was not constructed with minarets that are common in mosques in other Swahili towns. Structurally, the mosques are built around a central room, where its roof is supported by wood beams resting on square stone pillars. Two prominent mosques in Gedi are a rectangular “Great Mosque” in the inner wall and another one in the north of the walled city.
- The remaining houses at Gedi are for the elite members of Gedi society, since the majority of the population lived in the mud thatched dwellings in the outskirt. These houses are organized in a three-room structure, consisting of a forecourt and an inner courtyard. The entrances of houses vary in the configuration of their passageways, for maximum usage of space. Doorways usually consist of square framed pointed archways.
- The palace of the city's sheikh contains a large central room with two anterooms, each is organized around its own courtyard. Two additional courts for guests and reception can be accessed through different gates.
- The pillar tombs at Gedi are stone structures built upon a pillar or column, which are signature architectures in medieval Swahili towns. There are four large pillar tombs at Gedi. The most prominent one is the one in the inner wall, with Arabic inscription dating 1399.

External link about Gedi: https://www.museums.or.ke/gede/

3D model of Gedi site

== Songo Mnara, Tanzania ==
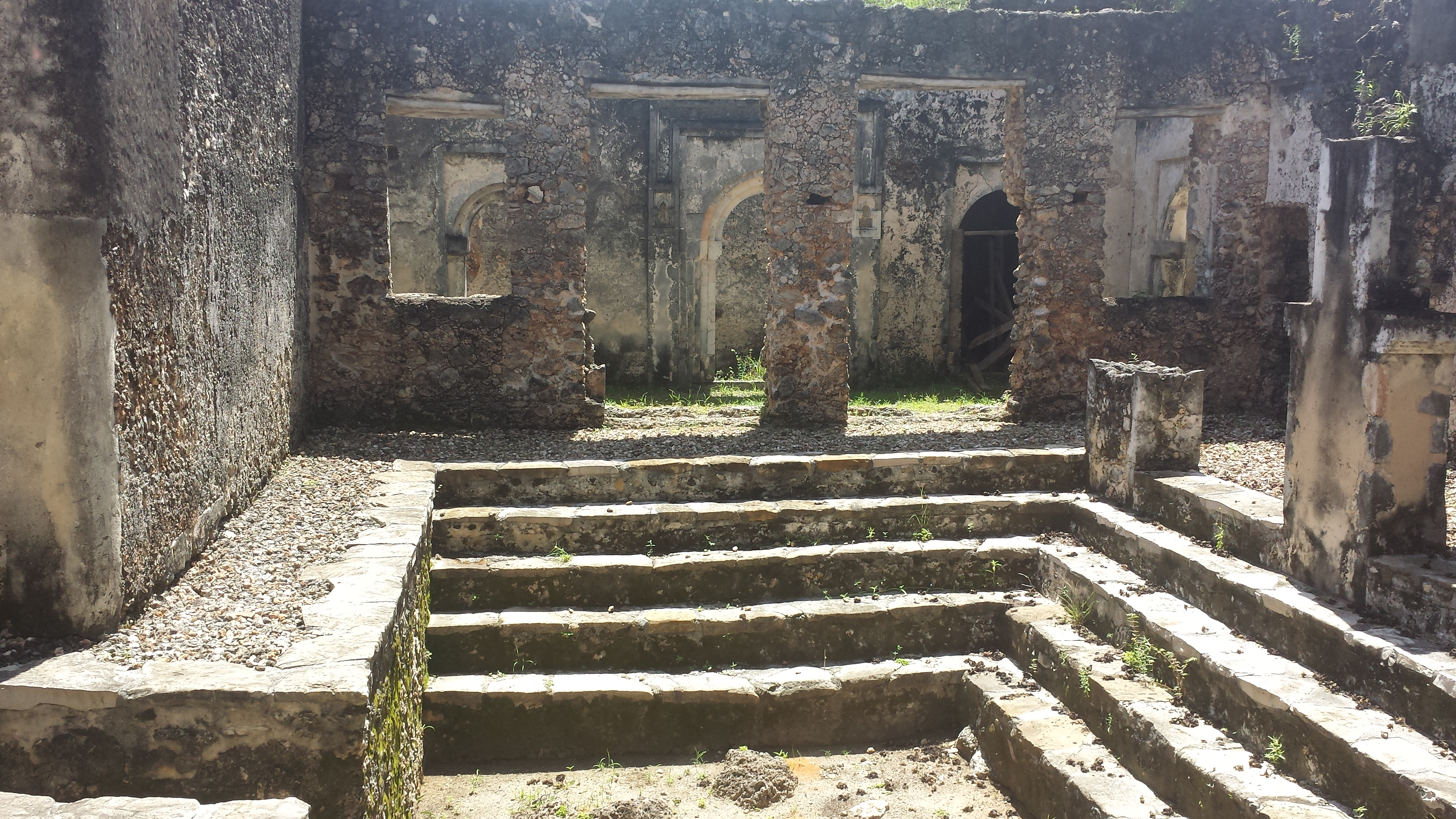
Songo Mnara Stone Ruins

The stone town of Songo Mnara lies on the Swahili Coast in southern Tanzania. It was occupied from the 14th to 16th centuries as one of the major trade towns on the Indian Ocean. Archaeologists have excavated six mosques, four cemeteries, and two dozen house blocks along with three enclosed open spaces on the island.

See more at Songo Mnara.

3D model of Songo Mnara

== Kilwa Kisiwani, Tanzania ==
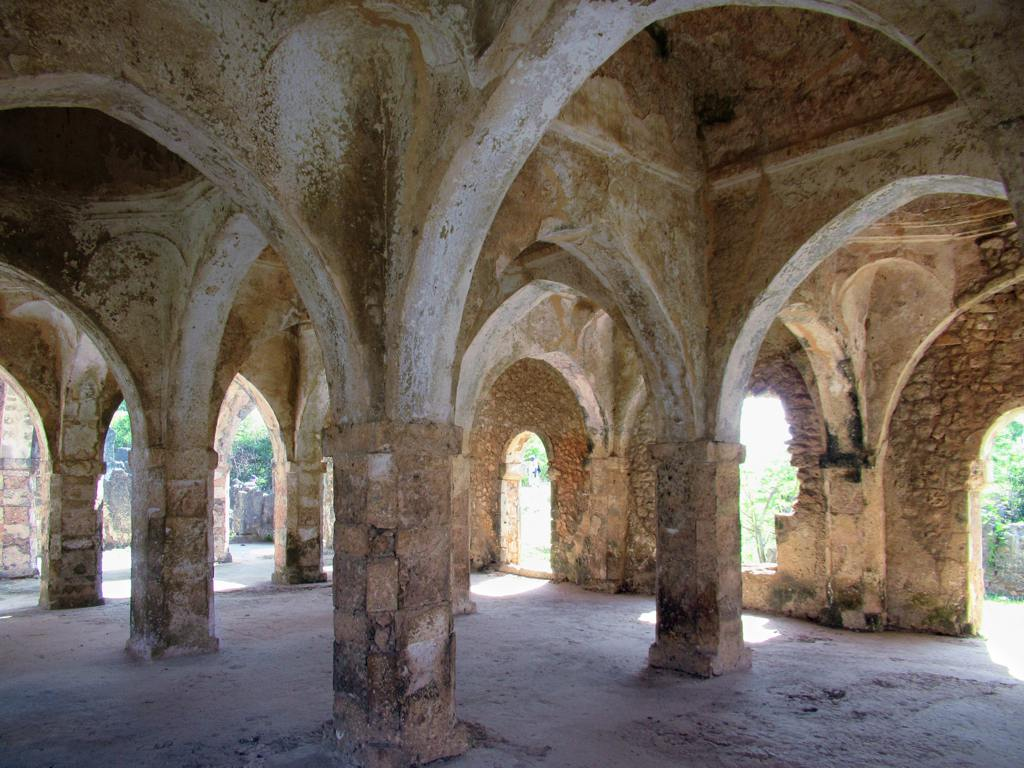
Great Mosque of Kilwa Kisiwani

Kilwa Kisiwani is a city-state site located along the southern coast of present-day Tanzania. Three key architectural features are the Great Mosque, Palace of Husuni Kubwa, and Husuni Ndogo.

See more at the Great Mosque of Kilwa

3D model of Kilwa Kisiwani

== Zanzibar, Tanzania ==
Stone Town of Zanzibar, also known as Mji Mkongwe (Swahili for "old town"), is the old part of Zanzibar City, the main city of Zanzibar, in Tanzania. The town was one of the largest pre-colonial urban cities along the East African coast. The site was occupied from as early as the tenth century by fishermen. By the sixteenth century, it emerged as one of Swahili towns, engaging in agricultural production and long-distance trade. The town grew rapidly during the nineteenth century under the British rule.

Similar to other Swahili towns, Zanzibar is divided into Mitaa that reflect inhabitants’ identities. Each Mitaa shares a standard Islamic plan, with a large mosque in the center with main streets running off in four directions from its vicinity. Local Swahili employed raw materials, including coconut palm founds, coral rag, lime, and mangrove poles, to elaborate multi-storied stone buildings. Plaster decorations and geometric designs can be found on the walls, doors, and entrances of Swahili elite houses. The doors of Zanzibar architecture are distinguished in a sense that they reflect the indigenous Swahili culture and subsequent influences from Arabians, Indians and others. The door is composed of seven basic elements, including a heavy lintel, two massive vertical side posts, and two door panels, forming a consistent contour.

3D Model of Big Hamamni (the biggest Persian baths in Zanzibar)

3D Model of Small Hamamni (the small Persian baths in Zanzibar)

3D Model of Belt El Amani

== See also ==
- Historic Swahili Settlements
