= Pande Mikoma =

Ward in Kilwa District, Lindi Region

Pande Mikoma Kata ya Pande Mikoma (Swahili)
- Ward
- Kata ya Pande Mikoma, Wilaya ya Kilwa
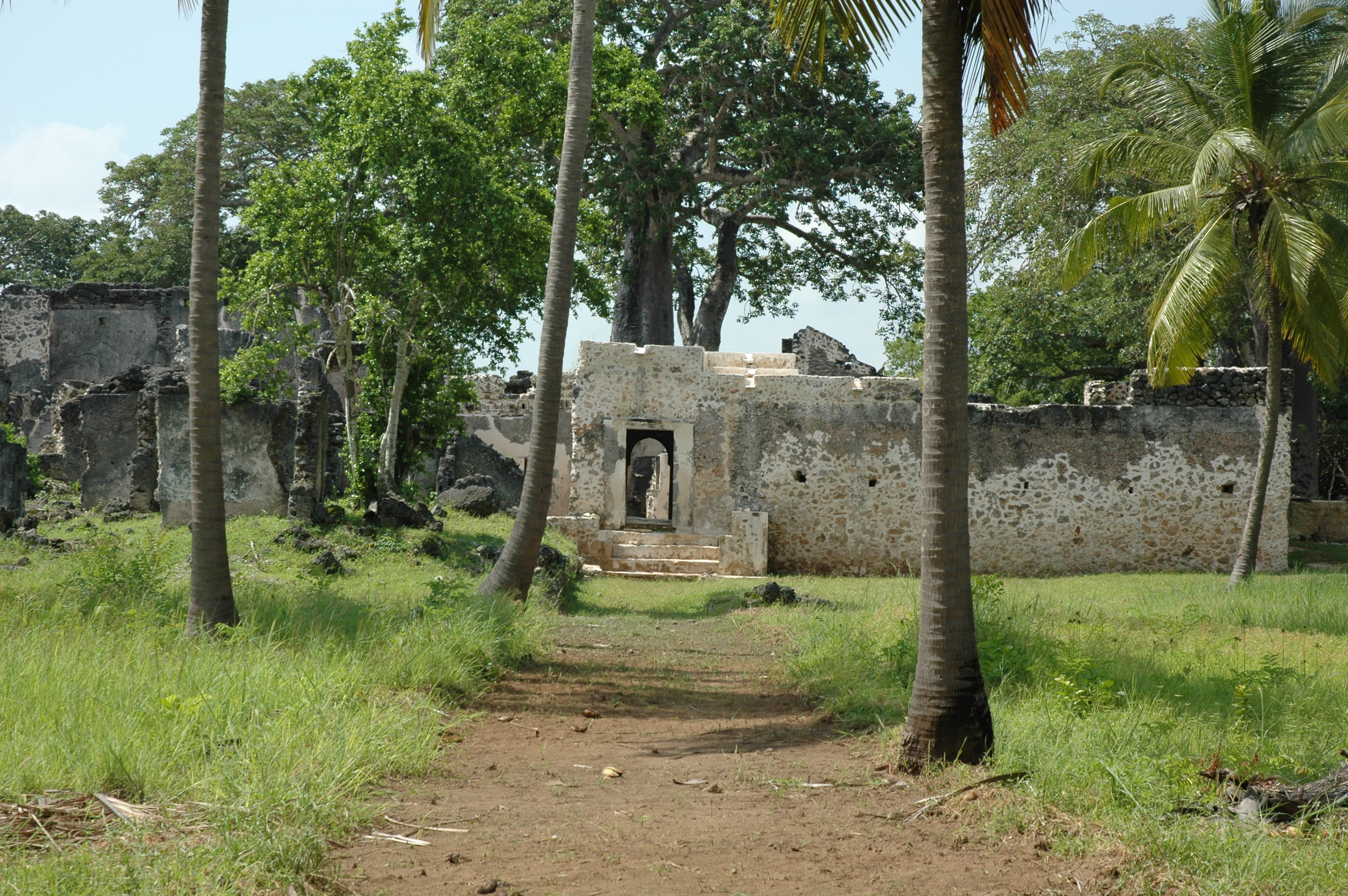
- Songo Mnara ruins, Pande Mkikoma, Kilwa District.

- Location within Tanzania
- Country: Tanzania
- Region: Lindi Region
- District: Kilwa District
- Seat: Pande Village

Area
  - Total: 201.6 km^{2} (77.8 sq mi)
- Elevation: 60 m (200 ft)

Population (2012)
  - Total: 11,596
  - Density: 57.52/km^{2} (149.0/sq mi)

Ethnic groups
  - Settler: Swahili
  - Native: Machinga
- Tanzanian Postal Code: 65409

Pande Mikoma is an administrative ward in Kilwa District of Lindi Region in Tanzania. The ward covers an area of 201.6 km^{2} (77.8 sq mi), and has an average elevation of 60 m (200 ft). According to the 2012 census, the ward has a total population of 8,094. The ward is home to the island of Songo Mnara Island which is home to the ruins of Songo Mnara, a World Heritage Site. The ward seat is Pande village.
