= Slavery in Kenya =

Slavery in Kenya existed for centuries, enslaved people were acquired through warfare and commerce. Enslaved people may have accounted for nearly 90% of the population of the Kenyan coast at certain points in the 19th century.

== History ==
=== Early Medieval and Portuguese period ===
In the 12th century, Arab geographer Muhammad al-Idrisi described how Arab traders lured children on the coast of present-day Kenya with dates in order to capture and enslave them. Scholars Henry Codjoe, John Alembillah Azumah, and Ronald Segal believe that Kenyans were among the Zanj slaves that led a slave-revolt in 9th century Iraq.

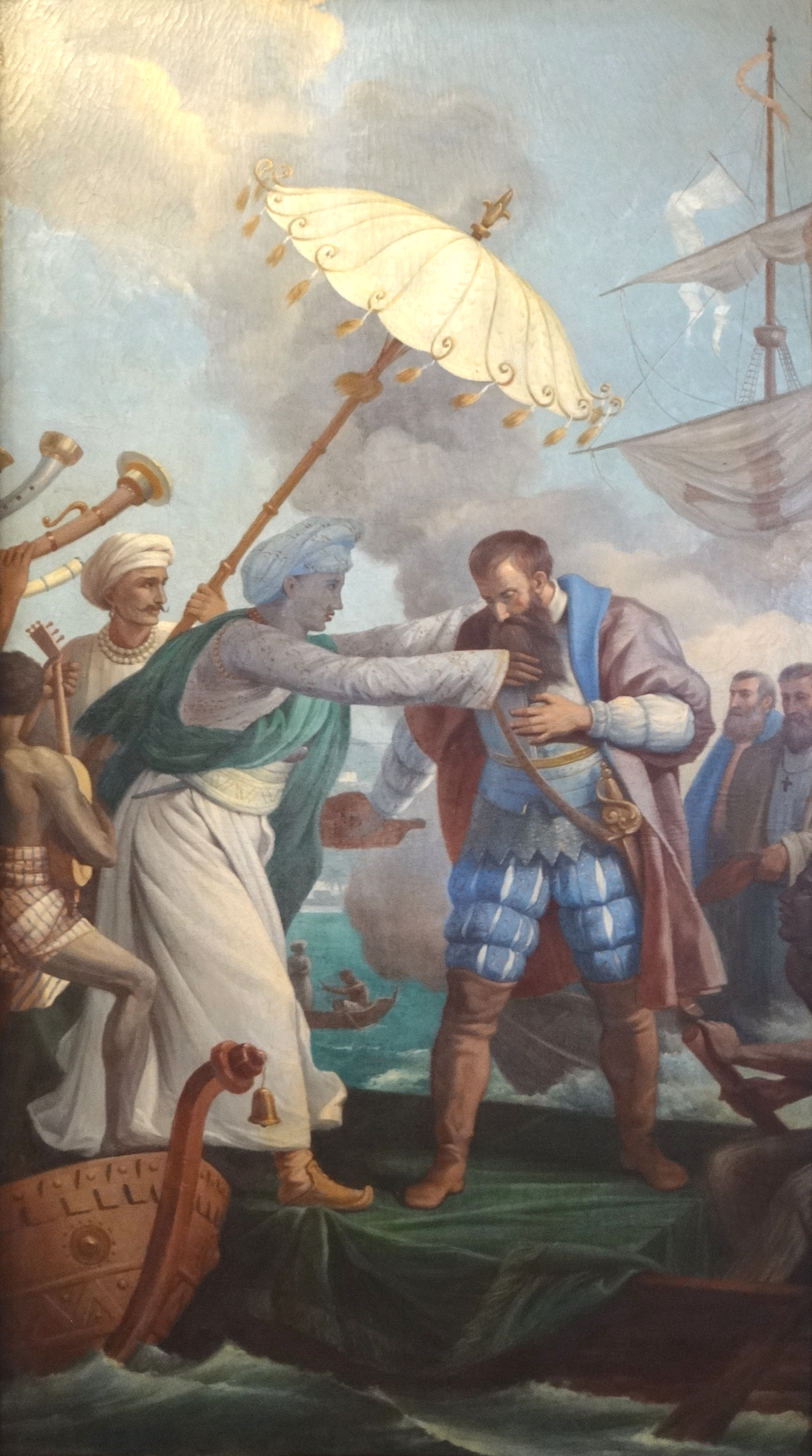
Vasco de Gama meeting with the King of Malindi.

Historian and archaeologist Stéphane Pradines notes that the oldest slave markets in East Africa were in Kenya and Somalia. The trade in enslaved people was a highly valued African export to Arab markets, with most slaves before the 15th century originating from Kenya and the Horn of Africa. Relatively few Portuguese sources document the sale and export of slaves between the 16th and 17th centuries, however, in 1505 when the Sultan of Mombasa refused to submit to the Portuguese, Francisco d’Almeida sacked and burned the city, enslaving and carrying off around a thousand of the most beautiful women with him.

In the early 16th century, the cities of Malindi and Mombasa welcomed Arab slave traders. As early as 1506, traders from Mombasa and Malindi, some of them Yemenis, imported slaves into the coastal cities. In 1518, a ship sailing from Malindi to Cambay carried enslaved people. The use of slave-girls as concubines was certainly widespread in the coastal areas. The mother of one of the sons of the king of Malindi in 1528 was a slave of “Cafre” origins. John Gordon Lorimer recounts that in 1515 the Portuguese employed hundreds of enslaved Oromos from the Swahili Coast as transport laborers.

The Portuguese living in Mombasa around 1630 also owned many slaves.

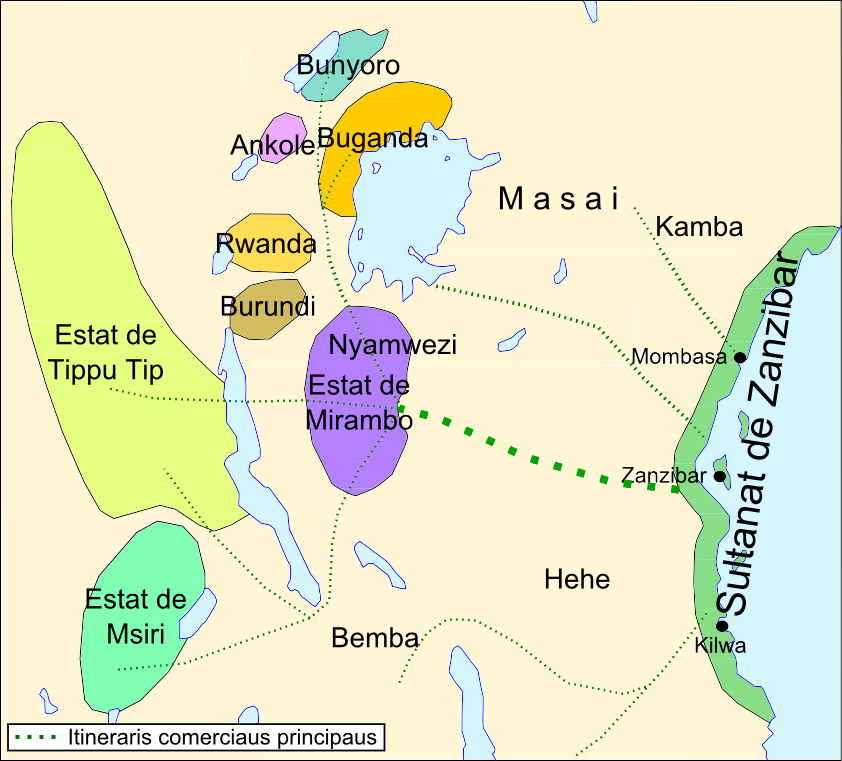
Omani Sultanate of Zanzibar in 1875.

=== Coastal slavery during the Omani period ===
During the Omani period and the later Sultanate of Zanzibar, the slave trade expanded. Along the Kenyan coast, the Zanzibari Arabs set up a prosperous plantation economy dependent on slave labor. According to Swahili scholars, the number of enslaved people before the 19th century was relatively small and largely limited to individuals purchased from Madagascar or the Cape Delgado region for domestic use, compared to later periods when it became more extensive. Traditional power relations changed during the early decades of the 19th century as Zanzibar rose to regional prominence in East-Africa after the Busaidi rulers of Oman moved their capital from Muscat to Zanzibar in the 1830s. Following years of resistance, they brought Mombasa and the sultanates of the Pate and Lamu archipelago under their control. The Busaidi then developed clove plantations, whose returns soon exceeded those of ivory and other exports. Enslaved labour became more valuable than the profits gained from exporting slaves abroad, and this Omani-driven slave economy flourished between 1840 and 1880.

In the 19th century, Lamu and Mombasa were the main slave importers in Kenya, with most slaves being imported from Zanzibar by sea, and later overland due to the ban of the slave trade by the British.

Even though Lamu did not play an active role in the slave trade until the early 19th century, its merchant elite nevertheless owned slaves. Domestic slaves were typically housed in the ground-floor galleries of merchant mansions, while those working on elite farms lived in daub-and-wattle huts on the outskirts of Lamu, in an area later known as Langoni. Following their victory in the Battle of Shela in 1812 against Pate and Mombasa, the Swahili city-state of Lamu sought protection from the Sultan of Oman to secure their dominance. In 1821, the Omanis built and garrisoned the Lamu fort. As the Omanis arrived, plantation-style slavery emerged along the Kenyan coast, and within a few decades enslaved people accounted for nearly a quarter of the population. By 1887, out of roughly 168,000 inhabitants between the Tana river and the Lamu archipelago, just over 40,000 were enslaved. As the Zanzibar slave market expanded in the early 19th century, coastal Kenya developed into a slave-importing region, where coastal communities (Arab, Swahili, and Somali) all relied on enslaved labor. Enslaved people carried out a wide range of roles, including artisanal work, military service, and domestic duties, though most laboured as agricultural workers along the coast, forming the backbone of a profitable grain export economy. The majority lived in fertile zones suited to plantation agriculture. During the 1860s, the Malindi hinterland was developed by the Zanzibari successors of Sultan Said as a key grain-producing region for the coastal Sultanate. Beyond Lamu, Takaungu, and Malindi, smaller concentrations of agricultural slaves were also found in the rural outskirts of Mombasa and the southern coastal interior.

Throughout the 19th century, the Omanis and Zanzibaris relied on Kilwa Kisiwani as a major source of slaves, drawing captives from a wide area in South-East Africa, particularly the Lake Nyasa region and northern Mozambique. Populations living inland from the Kenyan coast such as the Mijikenda of Kenya were generally not targeted, possibly because slave traders avoided antagonizing populations living in close proximity.

=== Inland slavery ===
Sir Arthur Henry Hardinge, British Consul-General in Zanzibar and the first Commissioner of the British East Africa Protectorate from 1895 to 1900, believed there was no connection between the slavery produced by inland inter-tribal warfare and the Zanzibari coastal slave system. Writing in 1896, he stated:

The conditions existing in these two African regions, separated from one another by 800 miles of wild country, are entirely different... whatever may have been the case in the past, there is now no connection between the local slave-trading resulting from inter-tribal wars among the natives of Ukamba and Kikuyu, and the existence of domestic slavery in the Sultanate of Zanzibar.

In the second half of the 19th century, Reuters was informed of considerable slave-dealing among the Kikuyu. The victims were mainly women and children raided from small Masai tribes. Due to the great famine of the 1890s, hundreds of Masai women were sold to the Kikuyu. In 1894, Kikuyus were reportedly selling Kamba and Masai girls at Mount Kenya in exchange for brasswire and beads. According to American explorer William Astor Chanler (1896), slaves originating from the Kikuyu region were sold to the Kamba in exchange for cattle. The Kamba employed these slaves in their plantations. The price of a good-looking Kikuyu or Masai girl was three goats. The Kamba also had a few Oromo slaves. On 18 April 1894, eight Masai slaves were freed from Funzi Island. Some captives from Kenya were taken through slave trade networks that could've reached as far as the Americas. One example is Thornton Williams, a Masai man who was captured in Kenya and sold in Texas to the O’Connor Ranches. According to Ainslee's Magazine of August 1900:

The favorite girls are those captured from the Masai and the Boran Gallas, whose charms appeal to Arabian Moslems somewhat as those of the Circassian women do to the Turks. The Boran are particularly renowned for their beauty, and a slave thief will risk his life to obtain one.. Masai girls are easier to capture, and are therefore more common. The tribe was formerly celebrated for its vast flocks and herds, but a devastating famine some years ago left it almost destitute. The warriors thereupon began a system of raiding on all sides, and another fierce tribe, the Wakikuyu, took advantage of their absence to descend on the Masai, kill off the old men and steal all the women and girls. These are now being disposed of at comparatively low rates to local Arab or Swahili middle-men, who retail them at a big profit. It will be only a generation or two, how- ever, when slavery shall have disappeared in British East Africa, for one can no longer legally buy a slave. This may be done only in German territory where the purchase is made subject to approval by a government officer.

In the 19th century, Somalis raided Oromo settlements, killing most men and taking women and children as slaves. The captives were incorporated into household life while remaining subjects. Oromo women, valued for their beauty, were kept as concubines, used as domestic servants, or married to other slaves. Scholar Catherine Besteman observed that: "The Somalis dominated in warfare during the 19th century, conquering and enslaving Oroma and Boran."

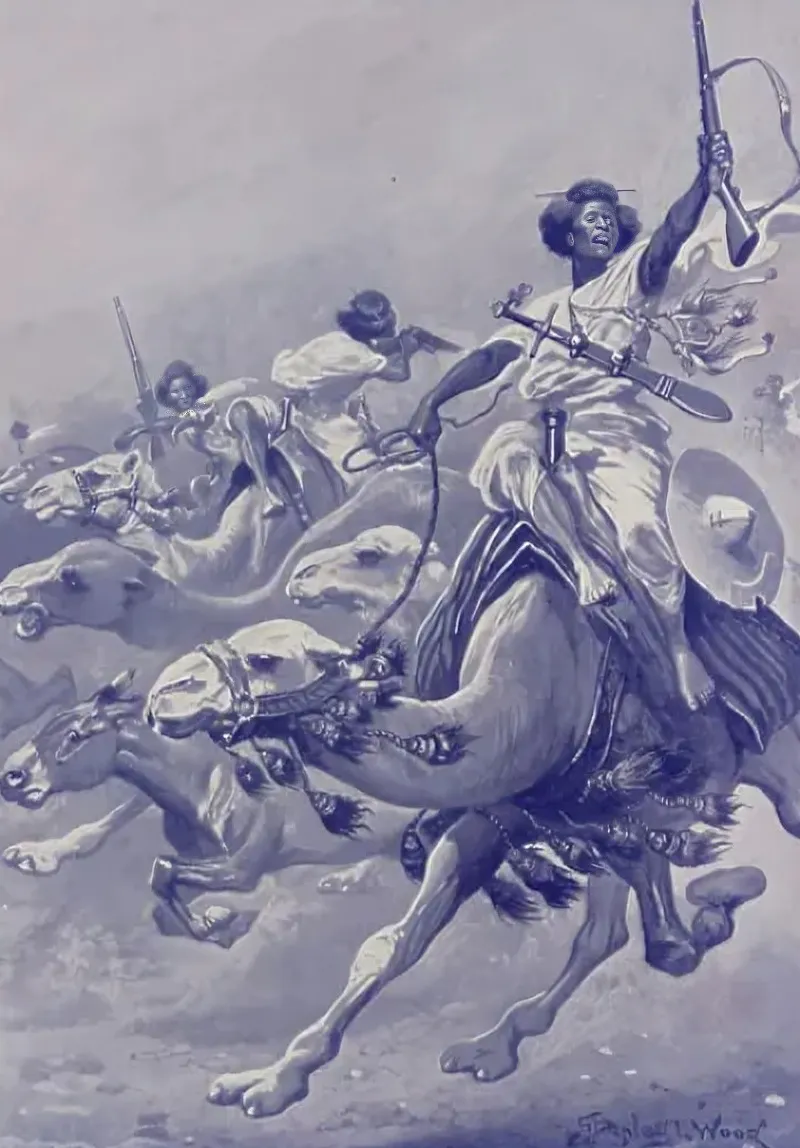
Somali raiding party

Somali raids on the Tana River Oromo and the Pokomo Bantus appear to have begun in the 1850s and 1860s, reaching a peak in the 1870s. By the 1870s, the steadily increasing number of Oromo captives being transported from Kenya was estimated at 10,000 annually crossing the Juba River into the Kismayo area. Demand for slaves increased to the point that a new overland caravan route from Lamu was established in September 1871. Within two years, it had become the principal route for transporting slaves from Kenya to the Benadir region in Somalia. During this period, it was reported that southern Somalis were importing as many as 4,000 slaves annually from the Lamu area. Those who carried out slave raids and those who traded in slaves were often distinct, belonging to different Somali clans. Contemporary accounts described Somali slave raiders as particularly feared, with reports that even rumors of their approach could prompt entire villages to flee or attempt negotiations with Somali elders. In at least one case, town gates were deliberately reinforced in response to the threat of such raids. There were also reports of Somali attacks on entire settlements to obtain captives. According to the colonial administrator Charles William Hobley, the Somalis attacked the Oromo in 1842 but were repelled. Peace was concluded in 1845, though fighting resumed in 1848, when the Somalis eventually gained the upper hand, killing about 2,000 Oromo elders and chiefs and capturing about 80,000 women and children. British explorer Harald George Carlos Swayne (1900) described a Somali raiding party of around 1,000 men near the Oromo settlement of Golbanti on the Tana.

The Somalis would also launch raids the Pokomo people during this period. British reports in 1894 described how the Somalis would come to the Pokomo country nearly every year during the dry season, carrying off women and children into slavery, while the Pokomo reportedly "never dreamed of offering any resistance." By 1898, the Pokomo began building new villages in inaccessible jungle areas due to frequent Somali slave-raids. The Somalis also enslaved the Kore and Laikipiak Masai in the 19th century, they were sent to the city of Kismayo to be sold to Somali traders. Portuguese missionary Leon des Avanchers mentioned seeing Masai among the Harti Somali when he visited the southern coastal area of Somalia in 1858. These Masai were freed by the British in the 1890s. During the famine of 1884-85, some Mijikenda families sold relatives into slavery in exchange for grain, and Somali traders in Lamu purchased Mijikenda slaves in the hundreds. Slaves were also sold to the Somalis at Wituland, and sometimes the Somalis raided the area for slaves.

In 1912, a French explorer claimed that repeated Somali slave-raids had severely depopulated parts of the Pokomo region:

If the Ndura was so sparsely inhabited, it was because the Somalis had ravaged it in every way, stealing, pillaging, kidnapping women and children as slaves, and killing those who defended themselves.

== Abolition and Manumission ==
In 1873, Sultan Barghash bin Said of Zanzibar was pressured by the British into signing a treaty outlawing the export and import of slaves and closed every public slave markets in his dominions. After this, English missionaries established settlements on the Kenyan coast and began sheltering liberated slaves. In 1876, an armed uprising occurred in Mombasa in response to efforts to suppress the slave trade. The main target was the Church Missionary Society settlement for liberated slaves at Freretown. On 23 May 1876, Reverend Price reported that around 400 Swahilis had gathered in Mombasa and threatened to attack Freretown for sheltering runaway slaves. The group also declared opposition to both the Wazungu (white men) and Sultan Barghash. Although initially dispersed by the Zanzibari governor's forces, they regrouped and planned a night assault, but the settlement was ultimately protected by local Zanzibari troops.

In 1888, the Zanzibaris lost Mombasa and the British formally established their foothold on the Kenyan coast, the East African protectorate was later established in 1895. Soon after taking control of the coastal strip in 1888, the Imperial British East Africa Company faced difficulties as large numbers of enslaved people fled plantations. Concerned about upsetting slaveowners and reliant on plantation output, the Company initially supported enforcing existing laws, including the return of runaways and restricting missions near Mombasa from sheltering them. This approach drew strong criticism in London. After administration passed to the Foreign Office in 1895, officials allowed slaveowners to pursue legal claims for lost labor but did not compel returns, instead pressuring runaways to work or lease land, sometimes under threat of vagrancy charges. During the Company era (1888-1895), the British attempted to organize a scheme in which enslaved people would work for wages to buy their freedom, but it achieved limited success. Some runaway leaders engaged with the plan, though many followers did not carry out the required labor. Meanwhile, enslaved people were increasingly leaving plantations with little fear of recapture. Behind Malindi and Takaungu, runaway communities developed productive farming settlements and became relatively prosperous. By the early 1900s during the protectorate period, these villages began to decline as former slaves no longer needed the protection of a community and could move around and find a place to farm themselves, their increasing ability to evade plantation control and social subordination became the main concern for runaways, and many showed little interest in obtaining formal freedom papers from the British. Finally, enslaved people gained additional alternatives to their economic dependence on landowners. Expanding imperial activity increased demand for caravan porters and other labor, and although slave porters were nominally required to give part of their wages to their owners, masters had limited control. By the 1890s, many complained that slaves left on caravans without permission and failed to hand over earnings. Mombasa served as a staging point for caravans to Uganda, after 1896, construction created further demand for labor. This led to a large movement of slaves from coastal towns. Although the work was often menial and dangerous, higher wages meant that by the late 1890s, those who fled their masters could support themselves independently.

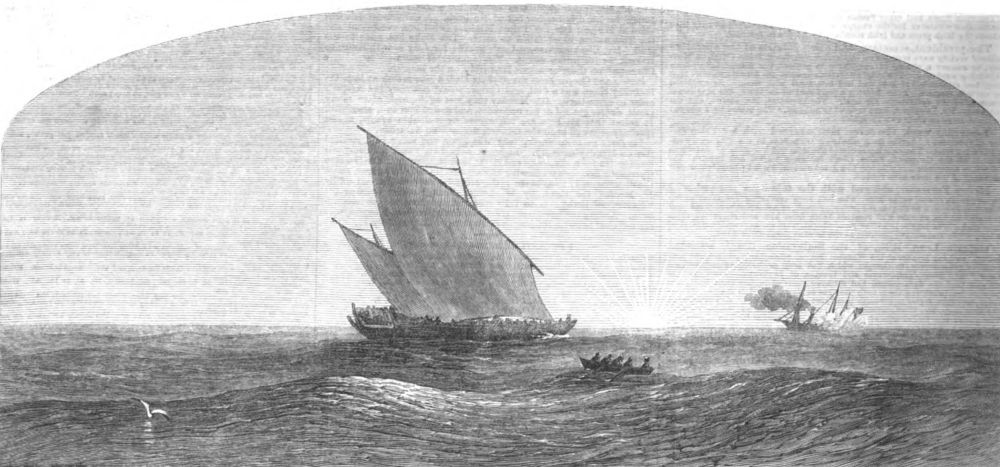
British forces capturing an Arab slave dhow.

In 1897, the coastal area from Mombasa to Kurwitu consisted of villages and plantations worked by enslaved people owned by Arabs from Mombasa. Since 1873, the region had been affected by unrest linked to resistance against European anti-slavery efforts, including figures such as Sheikh Hamis bin Kombo, known for opposing interference with slavery. By this point, Arab influence was reportedly in decline, and masters found it increasingly difficult to force enslaved people to work on their plantations. A series of British treaties with Zanzibar also restricted its developing trade.

While Barghash bin Said had only prohibited the transport of slaves from Zanzibar by sea in 1873, his successor Ali bin Said passed the Slave Trade Prohibition Decree of 1890, and later in 1897, slavery was completely abolished by Hamoud bin Mohammed who passed the Abolition Decree of 1897. Hamoud's acceptance and involvement in drafting the 1897 decree was largely limited to his insistence that concubines be excluded from its provisions, a position with which the British ultimately sympathized and accepted. The final abolition decree of 1897 was highly effective and accompanied by a complete reform of the judicial system. Between 1856 and 1897, the British pressured the Sultans of Zanzibar into signing eleven anti-slavery treaties and decrees that ended Zanzibar's export of slaves both abroad and to the Kenyan Coast.

In 1907, the British East Africa Protectorate formally abolished the legal status of slavery on the mainland. A considerable amount of work was done during the year in settling claims for compensation. A British official noted that even with the compensations the abolition of slavery, an institution that had existed for centuries, was not viewed favourably by the Arab community. Over three decades of “gunboat diplomacy,” driven by moral, commercial, and strategic motives, British naval cruisers captured around 1,000 slave dhows from the Zanzibar-Mombasa coast.

Although slavery was formally abolished in 1907 by decree of the Sultan of Zanzibar under British pressure, many enslaved people in Lamu remained with their owners due to local interpretations of Islamic law that recognized emancipation only when granted by a master or mistress. Those who left slavery, or were freed under the decree, often lived in severe poverty in the Langoni area of Lamu, where housing conditions were among the poorest in the town, while Hadhrami Afro-Arab ex-slave-owners lived in stone houses located in the central part of the city.

In the Northern Frontier District, Some British officials questioned efforts to curb Somali incursions, district commissioner Sharpe stated:

We try to stop him [the Somali]. Are we right? He is obviously of better material than many of our own tribes (referring to the Oromos & Bantus).

The British administration did not fully enforce the abolition decree in the NFD, officials often sided with Somalis in ways that preserved the subordinate status of the Oromo population. In 1930, the district commissioner of Garissa District nevertheless acknowledged that many Oromos living among Somalis were still treated as slaves. In 1936, the British administration declared that the Wardey (Oromo) had ceased to exist as a distinct ethnic group, claiming they had been assimilated into Somali society. The enslavement of Oromo populations in the Northern Frontier District continued into the British colonial period in Kenya, where British officers often classified Oromo groups as assimilated Somalis rather than enslaved communities, thereby avoiding the issue of slavery.

== Modern slavery ==
A 2017 BBC investigation reported that young women from Mombasa, including both Christian and Muslim communities, were reportedly recruited and trafficked by al-Shabaab into Somalia, where they were said to have been forced into sexual slavery. As of 2023, Kenya had 269,000 people living in modern day slavery. The Kenyan government response to modern slavery was rated 46/100 by the Walk Free Global Slavery Index.

== See also ==
- Arab slave trade
- Slavery in Zanzibar
- Slavery in Somalia
- Portuguese Empire
