= Battle of Shela =

Date	c. 1813
Location	Shela, Lamu Island, Kenya 2.297°S 40.911°E
Result	Victory for Lamu, leading to Omani domination of the coast

Belligerents
Lamu	Mombasa and Pate

Commanders and leaders
Zahidi Mngumi of Lamu	Sultan Ahmed of Pate
- Location on the East African coast

The Battle of Shela (or Kuduhu) occurred around 1812 on the sand dunes near the village of Shela on Lamu Island, in what is now Kenya, just south of the larger village of Lamu. The people of Lamu won against superior forces from Mombasa and Pate. The battle led to the domination of the coast by the rulers of Oman.

== Background ==
The Lamu Archipelago is a group of three islands off the coast of what is now Kenya. The largest and most fertile is Pate, the northernmost. Manda lies to the south of Pate, separated by a narrow channel from Lamu, the farthest south. Manda and Lamu are sandy and covered with dunes. Lamu supports mango and coconut trees. The islands provide the best anchorages on the coast north of Mombasa.

The battle was one of several between the people of Lamu and Pate during the 18th and 19th centuries. At the time of the war the population of Lamu was estimated at between 15,000 and 21,000, and the town was expanding its trade while Pate was in decline. The sultans of Pate had taken to living in Lamu. Both the Nabahani of Pate and their allies the Mazrui of Mombasa were recent arrivals with Arab origins. The conflict arose from resentment over domination by Pate by the Suudi elders of Lamu. When the Sultan of Pate, Fumo Madi, died, a contest for the succession began between his son Fumo Luti Kipunga and Ahmad bin Shaykh, a cousin. The Mazrui of Mombasa sided with Ahmad and sent troops to support his claim.

== Battle ==
The date of the battle is uncertain, but it was some time between 1807 and 1813. Most of the fighting occurred at Hidabu Hill. Lamu gained an unexpected victory over the forces of Pate and Mombasa. The story is that the tide unexpectedly retreated and stranded the invaders' boats, and while they tried to float them they were massacred. According to the Pate Chronicle, 81 "important" people died, as well as numerous slaves and "unimportant" people. The sands of the battle site held the skulls and bones of the dead for many years.

== Aftermath ==
The continued threat from their neighbors prompted the people of Lamu to call for help from Oman. Said bin Sultan, Sultan of Muscat and Oman (r. 1804-1856) sent a governor to Lamu around 1814. Sultan Sayyid Said bin Sultan assisted in construction of Lamu Fort, which began in 1813 and was completed around 1821. The Sultan used Fort Lamu as a base for defeating the Mazrui rebels in Mombasa, and for establishing control over the East African coast. He moved the capital of his sultanate to Zanzibar. With its strategic importance lost, Lamu soon declined in economic importance compared to Mombasa and Zanzibar. As a result, Pouwels argues that the Battle of Shela formed a decision point in the history of the coast of Kenya.
