= Bwana Mkuu =

Kenyan Sultan

Bwana Mkuu was a Sultan of Pate, Kenya, 1688 to 1713. At the time, Pate dominated Lamu. Bwana Mkuu set up residency at Lamu, complete with a Lamu lady as one of his wives and a private mosque. Bwana Mkuu was the youth name of Sultan Abubakar.

== The Rulers of Pate ==
In the year 1738 (1151 Hijra), the civil wars between the Arabs worsen until the Omani were unable to cope with the affairs in East Africa. The Quarrel between the Arabs and the Nabahans amongst the two tribes Henawi and Ghafr, then the Yorubi fought the Nabahan and they gained strength and defeated the ruling Nabahany. According to the Pate Chronicle, Suleiman bin Muthafar fled and landed in Pate, by that time, the inhabitants of Pate were the people who had been sent by Khalifa Abdul Malik bin Murian. Suleiman Bin Muthafar made good relations with the chief of Pate Is-haki, he went and asked for his daughter in Marriage, Suleiman Bin Muthafar married the daughter of the Pate Chief and he was given a portion in the Kingdom of Pate to rule, he had a son by the daughter of the Pate chief and called him Mohammad. After his death, his son Suleiman Bin Suleiman took over the Kingdom and took possession of all his people, his wealth and his soldiers, it was he who first took the name of Sultan of Pate and this by right, for his father came forth from their country bearing the title of Sultan.

== Bwana Mkuu Kingdom ==
Sultan Abubaka also known as Bwana Mkuu, was known to be the father of Sultan Mohammed, who took over the Sultanate after the death of His son Sultan Mohammed. Sultan Bwana Mkuu was a good friend of the Portuguese. The influence of the Portuguese grew in the kingdom of Sultan Bwana Mkuu and they became close to the Sultan, the attraction of the friendship made the Portuguese live in Pate and they started trading in Pate. The Portuguese advised Sultan Bwana Mkuu to introduce tax as a way to raise the profit in trade. Sultan Bwana Mkuu then built a custom house in Pate called Fandikani, which means customs in the Portuguese language.

== The Impact of the Sultan Bwana Mkuu Kingdom ==
The friendship of the Sultan Bwana Mkuu with the Portuguese had brought many benefits to Pate people.

- The Portuguese advised the Sultan Bwana Mkuu to introduce tax in trade as a way to add profit in trade.
- The Portuguese built Fandikani house also known as customs house in the Portuguese language to collect tax
- The Portuguese taught the people of Pate how to excavate wells in the rocks by means of gunpowder
- The Portuguese built houses on the rock and made an underground passage to Pongwa rock
- The Sultan Bwana Mkuu Kingdom was wealth and the whole Pate became wealthy
- Sultan Bwana Mkuu made large houses and put in them brass lamps with chimneys, they made ladder of silver to climb up to bed and silver neck chains

== Death of Sultan Bwana Mkuu ==
Sultan Bwana Mkuu died and left seven children of who Mohammad reigned and he was called Bwana Fumomadi the Second then Sultan Mohammad died and Abubakar the son of Sultan Bwana Mkuu reigned, during his sultanate strife arose between him and the Portuguese. The Portuguese fought with Pate and the people of Pate were grievously afflicted. Sultan Abubakr sent a Sherif who was a very holy man who pray to Allah on behaved of Pate people against their enemies. The Sherif gave Sultan Abubakar two of his Son and they were brought to Pate. The Sherif sons settled in Pate and Married, from this time the Portuguese could not attack Pate people, they tried several times without success so they decided to make peace and came to an agreement with the Sultan of Pate. Afterwards the Sultan Abubakar died, and his son Bwana Mkuu reigned.

== Sultan Bwana Mkuu II Kingdom ==
During the Sultan Bwana Mkuu II, Pate became wealthy again. Sultan Bwana Mkuu II allowed foreigners from Barawa to settled in Pate. The Barawa arrived in Pate with much wealth, and they bought houses and even bought firewood and wells in Pate.

== Death of Sultan Bwana Mkuu II ==
Afterwards Sultan Bwana Mkuu II died and sultan Ahmed, the son of his cousin reigned. Sultan Ahmed was a very good man and loved his subject much. He reigned for seven years without rainfall and then he abdicated of his free will and gave the throne to Sultan Mohammad the son of sultan Abubakar. Sultan Mohammad quarreled with the Portuguese and they turned him out of the throne and gave it to the son of the Sultan Bwana Mkuu who was called Abubakar who agreed with the Portuguese very well. Sultan Abubakar loved to travel about and visited many places. Behind him the Pate people were intrigued and put Sultan Mohammad the son of his brother on the throne. When Sultan Abubakar returned he could not take over Pate again.

== Sultan Bwana Mkuu III Kingdom ==
Sultan Mohammad married his son to the daughter of Abubakar and name him Bwana Mkuu. Who later became Sultan Bwana Mkuu III. Sultan Bwana Mkuu III consolidated Sultan Ahmed and Fomuloti in the council of elders to create peace among the two sultans, when Fumoluti Kipunga refused to accept sultan Ahmed as his Sultan.

== The Effects of the Portuguese in Pate Island ==
The Portuguese took an interest in East Africa from the beginning of the 16th century. They destroyed a number of towns during the sixteenth century in their attempt to Monopolize Indian trade. The arrival of Oman made the Portuguese influence declined at the coast. In the 740 Sultan Mohamed died and his son Sultan Omar reigned, he was also known as Fumomari. Sultan Omar had a nephew who was very fond of travelling, during his tripe his servants discovered sand melt when they fire blazed while they were cooking food for Sultan Omar nephew. So they made a plan to load their ship with the sand, for this sand was a silver ore, on arrival they put the sand in a store and called a skilled workmen and showed them a little, and when they made an ornament out of it they found it was a pure silver. Now it was at this time that the Portuguese arrived in Pate again and this time they came in friendship. The Sultan showed the ore to the Portuguese because of his joy he narrated the whole story of how he found the ore, the Portuguese took the captain and went to search for the place they returned again without finding it when they came back to Pate they found sultan died and found Bwana Mkuu the Sultan in the year 825. The Portuguese stayed at Pate and Dondo and they were in friendship with Sultan Bwana Mkuu . The Portuguese influence grew great in town of Pate, they traded with good and assisted the Sultan Bwana Mkuu on ways to get profits and taught people of Pate how to excavate wells in the rocks by means of gunpower.

== See also ==
- List of rulers of Pate
