= List of rulers of Pate =

List of rulers of Pate

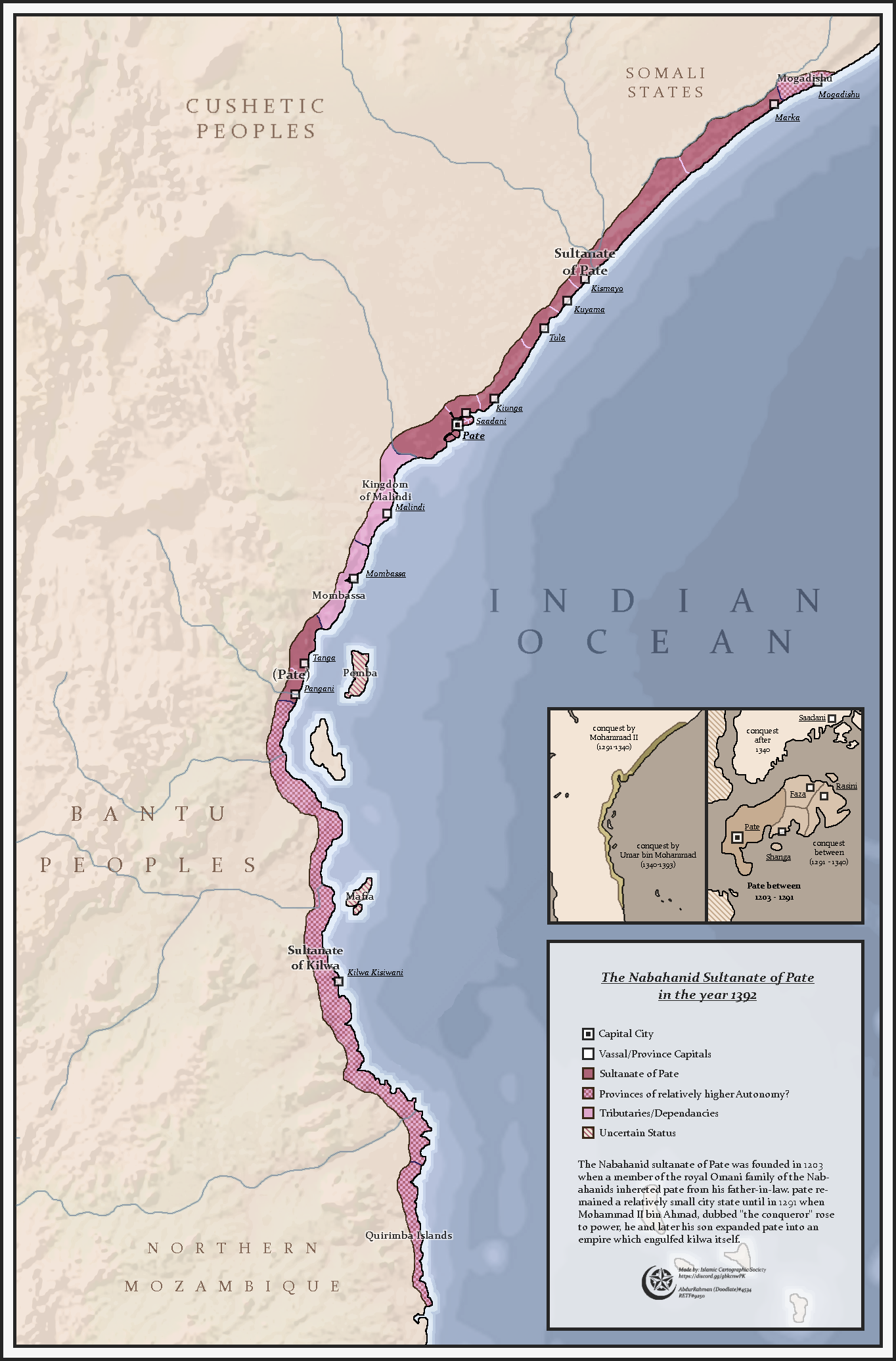
nabahani sultanate of pate 1392

Located at Pate Island, Kenya.

Term	Incumbent	Notes
1203	Pate sultanate independence from Kilwa Kisiwani
Mfalume (Sultans)
Nabahani Dynasty
1689 to 1713	Bwana Mkuu, Mfalume
1713 to 1722	Bwana Tamu, Mfalume
1722 to 1737	Bwana Bakari
1737 to 1763	Ahmad
1763 to 1773	Mwana Mimi (female)
1773 to 1776	Fumo Luti bin Shaykh
1776 to 1809	Fumo Madi ibn Abi Bakr, Mfalume
1809 to 1813	Ahmad ibn Shaykh, Mfalume
1813 to 1818	Fumo Luti Kipunga ibn Fumo Madi, Mfalume
1818 to 18??	Fumo Luti ibn Ahmad, Mfalume
18?? to 1823	Bwana Shaykh ibn Fumo Madi, Mfalume	1st Term
1823 to 18??	Bwana Waziri ibn Bwana Tamu, Mfalume	1st Term
18?? to 18??	Bwana Shaykh ibn Fumo Madi, Mfalume	2nd Term
18?? to 1830	Bwana Waziri ibn Bwana Tamu, Mfalume	2nd Term
1830 to 1840	Fumo Bakari ibn Shaykh, Mfalume
1840 to 1856	Ahmad ibn Fumo Bakari, Mfalume, see Wituland
1856 to 1858	Ahmad Simba Balla ibn Fumo Luti, Mfalume
... Dynasty
1858 to 1870	Shaykh Muhammad, Mfalume
1870	State abolished

== See also ==
- Pate Chronicle
- Wituland
- List of Sunni Muslim dynasties
