= Knowledge Empowering Youth =

Knowledge Empowering Youth (KEY Libraries) is a non-profit organization that develops replicable models of school and community libraries. It has operations in Kenya and Canada, with programs delivered through partnerships and collaborations.

== History ==
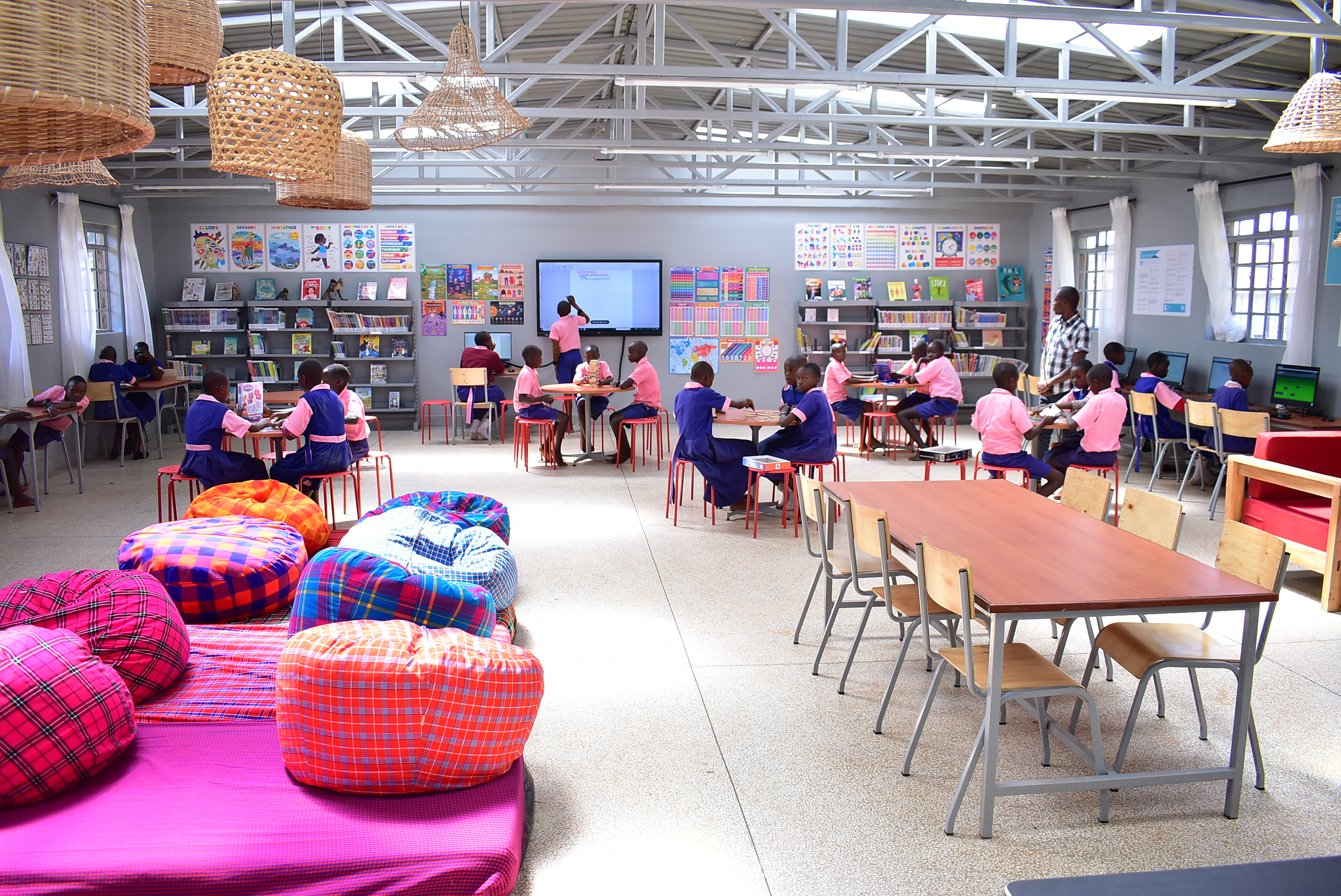
KEY Library in Elgeyo Marakwet, Kenya

KEY Libraries was founded in 2007 by Rita Field-Marsham to address gaps in access to functional school libraries in Kenyan public schools, particularly in under-resourced and low-income communities in both urban and rural areas. The organization's work focuses on strengthening school libraries within the formal education ecosystem and supporting librarians as facilitators of reading, digital literacy, and learning.

== Programs and operations ==
Knowledge Empowering Youth (KEY Libraries ) works with schools and local and international organizations in Kenya to support school and community library development, educational resources, and librarian training.

The organization's library model includes print and digital collections, a library management system, learning technologies, learning technologies, and designed learning spaces and programs that support literacy, digital skills, and civic education.

In 2023, KEY Libraries launched a professional development workshop for school librarians, bringing together librarians and education stakeholders from across Kenya through partnerships with the Kenya Library Association, the Kenya National Library Service, and the Goethe-Institute Nairobi. The workshop also included participation from faculty of Florida State University College of Communication and Information.

== Recognition and awards ==
In 2025, KEY Libraries was named a Successful Practices Honoree by the Library of Congress Literacy Awards Program, which recognizes nonprofit organizations that have made noteworthy contributions to increasing literacy and promoting reading through replicable strategies.

Libraries supported by KEY in Kenya have also received recognition through Kenya's Maktaba Awards (Library of the Year Award).

== Policy context and advocacy ==
KEY Libraries model is aligned with Kenya's national framework for libraries, including the National Policy on Libraries (2022) and the draft Libraries of Kenya Bill (2022), which address access to information, digital literacy, and the role of libraries within education systems.
