= List of libraries in Kenya =

== National and public libraries ==
The National Library and the public libraries are both the functions of Kenya National Library Service which is mandated by the law under Cap 225 of the Laws of Kenya, April 1965. Currently there is one National Library which is located at Community-Upper Hill, Nairobi. There are 64 public libraries spread in different parts of the country. In addition, some of the county government have libraries under them which are either operational or nonoperational. Nairobi county has four libraries located at Kayole, Makadara, Dagoretti and McMillan Memorial Library at the Nairobi Central Business District (the oldest library in Nairobi).

Kenya National Library Service has a total of 64 branches spread in different parts of the country. The libraries offer varied services depending on location and mode of establishment.

=== Branches within Kenya National Library Service Network ===
No.	County	No. of Libraries	Area Situated
1	Baringo	3	Kabarnet, Meisori, Eldama Ravine
2	Bomet	1	Silibwet
3	Bungoma	1	Kimilili
4	Busia	None	–
5	Elgeyo/Marakwet	1	Lagam
6	Embu	1	Embu
7	Garissa	3	Garissa, Mbalambala, Masalani
8	Homa Bay	None	–
9	Isiolo	1	Isiolo
10	Kajiado	None	–
11	Kakamega	2	Kakamega, Lusumu
12	Kericho	1	Kericho
13	Kiambu	1	Thika
14	Kilifi	3	Kilifi, Dzitsoni, Malindi
15	Kirinyaga	None	–
16	Kisii	1	Kisii
17	Kisumu	2	Kisumu, Koru (Dr. Robert Ouko Memorial Library)
18	Kitui	1	Mwingi
19	Kwale	1	Kwale (Ukunda)
20	Laikipia	2	Nanyuki, Rumuruti
21	Lamu	None	–
22	Machakos	None	–
23	Makueni	3	Mutyambua, Kinyambu, Kithasyu
24	Mandera	1	Mandera
25	Marsabit	1	Moyale
26	Meru	3	Meru, Mikumbune, Timau, Gatimbi
27	Migori	1	Awendo
28	Mombasa	1	Mombasa
29	Murang'a	2	Murang'a, Kangema
30	Nairobi	3	Nairobi Area, Buruburu, Kibera
31	Nakuru	3	Nakuru, Naivasha, Gilgil
32	Nandi	1	Kapsabet
33	Narok	2	Narok, Lelechonik
34	Nyamira	None	–
35	Nyandarua	1	Ol Kalou
36	Nyeri	4	Nyeri, Munyu, Chinga, Karatina
37	Samburu	None	–
38	Siaya	3	Nyilima, Rambula, Ukwala
39	Taita Taveta	3	Wundanyi, Voi, Werugha (Mary Patch Turnbull Memorial Library)
40	Tana River	None	–
41	Tharaka Nithi	None	–
42	Trans Nzoia	None	–
43	Turkana	None	–
44	Uasin Gishu	1	Eldoret
45	Vihiga	None	–
46	Wajir	5	Wajir, Griftu, Habasweni, Tarbaj, Bute
47	West Pokot	None	–
48.	Athi river	Elimika resource center	
	TOTAL	64	

== Community libraries ==
Community libraries have been established through the support of donors, individuals and institutions within the country as a way of empowering disadvantaged communities, promoting increased literacy levels and as a way of promoting a reading culture within the country. Some of these libraries are:

- Mathare Youth Sports Association Libraries (located in slums) – has two branches
- Busia Community Library
- Akili Community Libraries
- Container Libraries in Kenya
- Sidarec Community Library
- Kigima Resource Centre
- Elangata Wuas Resource Centre
- Hosanna B&K Library, (located at Praise Jesus Park, Salvation Street, Kahuro).
- Karen Roses Joint Body Resource Centre
- Micato-Amshare Library and Resource Centre (located in Mukuru slums) – offers free services to the community

== Academic libraries ==
Under this category are the libraries found in public academic institutions like the public universities, colleges, polytechnics and academies. These libraries mostly contain academic books and information resources relating to the subjects of concentration by those institutions. The leading academic Library in Kenya is under the University of Nairobi, the first university to be established in Kenya in 1956 as the Royal Technical College.

== See also ==
- List of universities and colleges in Kenya
- Library associations in Kenya
- Mass media in Kenya
