= Kibera Community Library =

Library in Nairobi, Kenya

knls, Kibera Community Library is one of the 64 branches in the Kenya National Library Service network, it is located in Kibera which is one of the biggest impoverished settlements in Nairobi, Kenya. It is home to an estimated one million people covering an area of 2.5 square kilometres. The library was set up in 2012 by the Kenya National Library Service (knls) in partnership with Practical Action (an NGO) and Berkley Foundation (UK). Kibera Community Library is surrounded by over 25 primary schools, 4 secondary schools and a tertiary college.

The Library, which receives over 500 visitors daily, is an invaluable resource for schools when it comes to implementing the Social Pillars of Kenya. One of the key projects offered by the Kibera Community Library is “Kids on the Tab” project which was started in 2012. The main objective of the project was to meet and stimulate the desire for education among the younger population of the slum area and to match opportunities for children from poor families to interact with technology to advance their learning and improve school performance. The library also often holds reading campaigns for children within the slum area.

== See also ==
- Kenya National Library Service
- Nairobi Area
