= Lamu Fort Library =

Library in Kenya

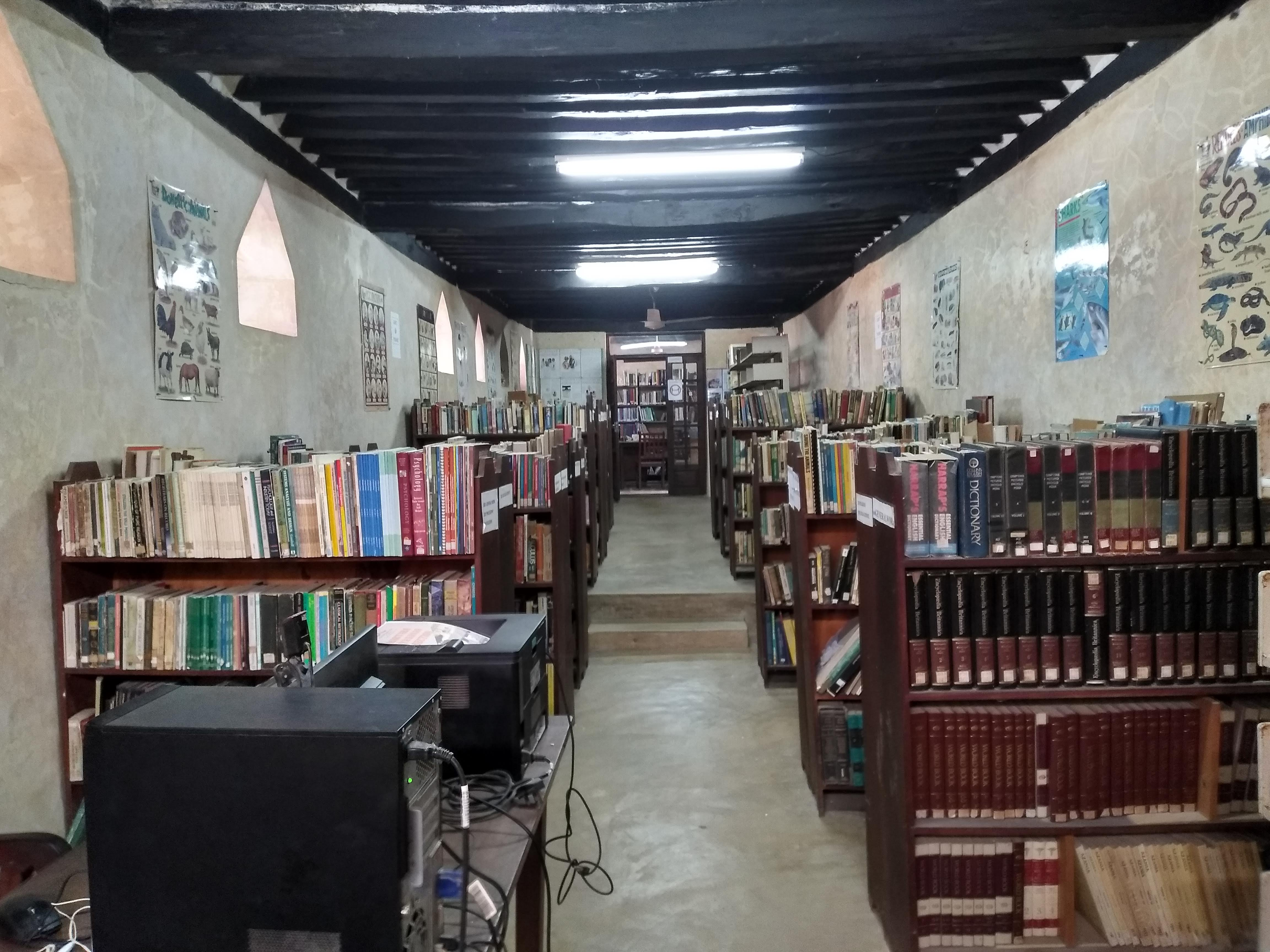
Lamu Fort Library

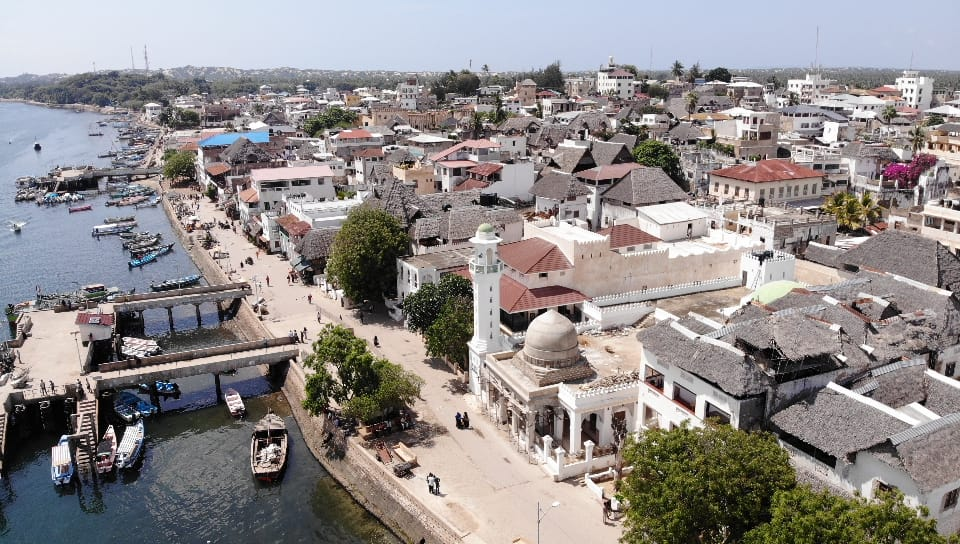
Lamu Island

Lamu Fort Library is a branch of the National Museums of Kenya. The Library was initiated in 1978 as a reference library for museum's staff and researchers. In 1986, it was relocated to a more spacious room at the Lamu Fort Museum.

== History of the library ==
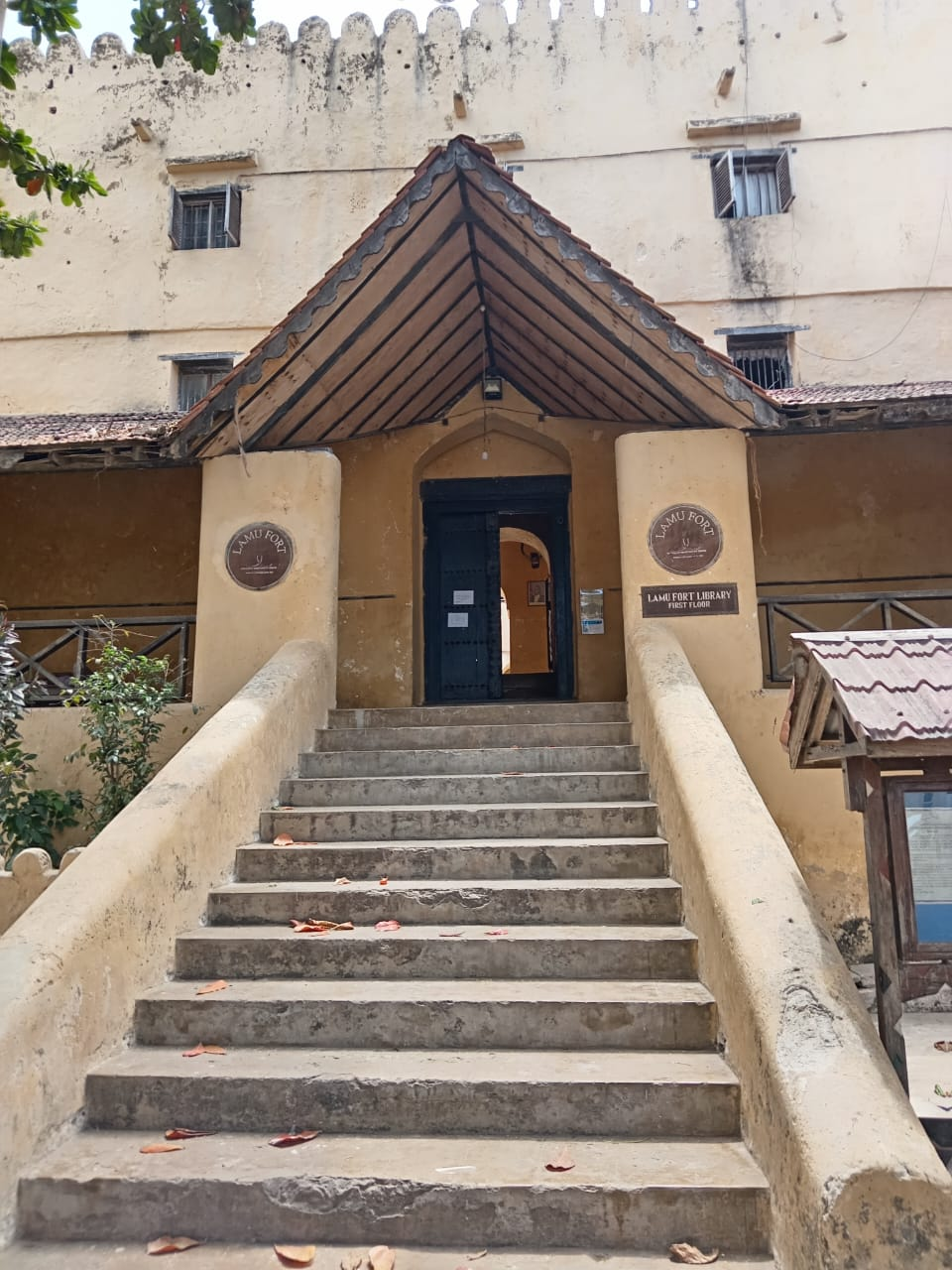
Lamu Fort

The library is a department of Lamu Fort Museum. It is the only public library in Lamu. Under British colonial rule, the fort was a prison, which it remained until 1984. In 1985, it was given to the National Museums of Kenya who converted the fort into a museum with assistance from the Swedish International Development Cooperation Agency (S.I.D.A). In 1986 the library was officially reopened at the fort museum by Mr. K. Nordenskiöld, a former director of S.I.D.A on Tuesday 22 April 1986.

== Classification of library collection ==
The library uses the Dewey Decimal Classification system to classify its collection. Lamu Fort Library still uses a Browne Charging system to lend books. The library has about 10,000 items classified under Dewey Decimal Classification System. The catalogue uses the Anglo-American Cataloguing Rules.

== Siyu Fort Library ==
Siyu Fort Library was started in 2020 with the assistance of the Lamu Fort Librarian, Khadija Twahir. The Library collection consists of donations from the Lamu Fort Library, the British Council, Macmillan, the National Museum of Kenya Resources Center and individual donors. The Fort is Located between Siyu Primary School and a hospital. The library collection is classified using the Dewey Decimal Classification and catalogued using Anglo American Cataloguing rules.

== Lamu Fort Library Sections ==
=== Research section ===
The research section holds theses, projects, historical books, periodicals, bibliographies, and dissertations. The collection covers Lamu history, archaeology, anthropology and poetry. It includes many rare publications of popular Swahili writers such as: Professor Sheikh Nabhany, Lamu Conservation books by Usam Ghaidan, and Quest for the past : An historical guide to the Lamu Archipelago by Chrysee MacCasler Perry Martin and Esmond Bradley Martine, Francesco Siravo and Ann Pulver, new research collections "in this fragile World" a book edited by Clarissa Vierke and Annachiara Raia and many more.

=== Archive section ===
The library holds a large and diverse range of archival materials such as old photographs from Lamu, 19th and 20th century manuscripts, old newspapers, magazines and periodicals, as well as old currencies, and files.

Part of the archive has been digitised. The UMADA (Ustadh Mau Digital Archive), supervised by the African Studies Centre Leiden, project digitized roughly two thousand manuscripts and audio cassettes from Lamu poet and imam Mahmoud Ahmed Abdulkadir, known locally as Ustadh Mau The digitization was funded by UCLA's Modern Endangered Archives Program. The digitized poems and sermons can be freely accessed via the UCLA Library Digital Collections.

From 2021 onward, the MprinT project, managed by Professor Anne Katrine Bang from Bergen University, Norway, has digitsed various Islamic manuscripts in the Lamu Archipelago.

=== E-library ===
The E-library comprises various digital items including digital books from Z-library and digitalization that was done by the library's archive section. The section contains over one thousand English digital books, including Kenyan school syallabus books. The collection was started with the help of Shama Abdul Gaziza who donated computers and a smart TV to the library.

=== Maktaba ya Sanaa ===
The Lamu Maktaba ya Sanaa section was created in 2018. The section includes: art books, zines, periodicals, art catalogues, magazines, and other materials intended to provide reference materials for artists. The Maktaba ya Sanaa project was initially launched during the Lamu Art festival in 2016. The second launch was at Africa Studies Centre Library at Leiden University in the Netherlands by Karin Voogd in 2017.

== Awards ==
Lamu Fort Library is a member of Kenya Library Association and has participated in Maktaba Awards Competition since 2010. In 2011, Lamu Fort Library was awarded 2nd runner up in Public Library Categories and 3rd runner up in Community Library in 2018.

== Friends of the Library ==
1. Africa Studies Centre Leiden University Library, Netherlands
2. Bergen University Norway
3. Professor Anne Katrina Bang
4. Wikimedia Kaduna User group Nigeria
5. Shama Abdul Gaziza from USA
6. Karin Voogd Rotterdam, Netherlands
7. AgaKhan Foundation, Lamu
8. Agakhan University Hospital Library Nairobi
9. Ustadh Mau
10. Assistant Professor Annachiara Raia
11. Book Bunk Trust
12. Faith Mwanyolo Wikimedia Foundation Kenya
13. Digital Librarian from Admiralty University of Nigeria

=== Other National Museums of Kenya Libraries ===
- National Museum of Kenya Resource Centre
- Malindi Web Library
- Coastal Resource Centre Library
- Botanic Library
- Zoological Library
