= Bwana Tamu =

Bwana Tamu was Sultan of Pate, Kenya, from 1713. He decided to wage a war on Lamu in order to get the guns that the Portuguese had buried on Lamu Island, on Hedabu Hill. However, his boats were overloaded with fire-arms and they sank on the way to Lamu.
