= Lamu Fort =

Fortress in northeastern Kenya

- Lamu, Kenya
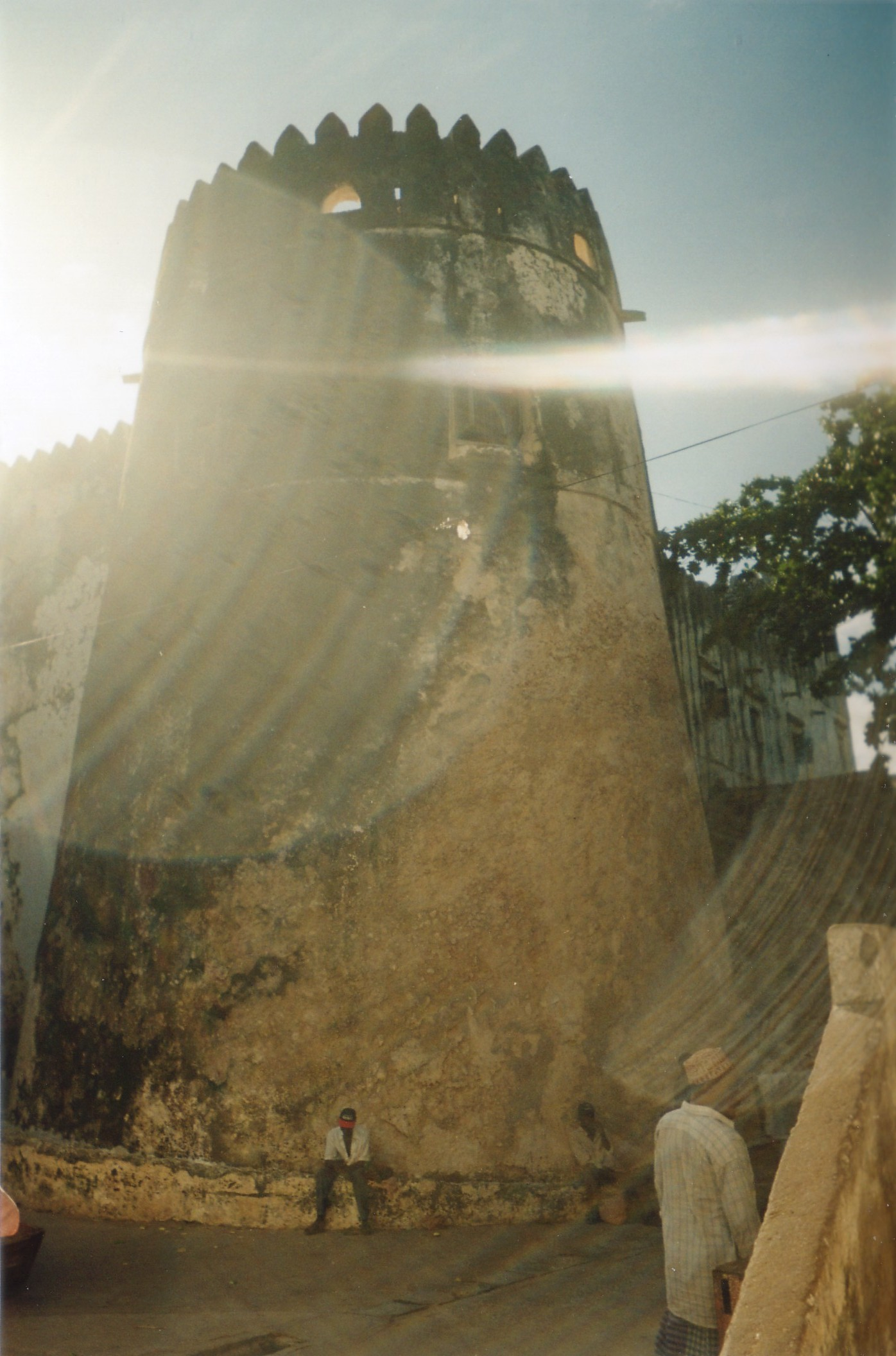
- Tower of Lamu Fort

Site information
- Open to the public: Yes
- Condition: Restored

Location
- Location within Kenya
- Coordinates: 2.269346°S 40.90218°E
- Height: 2-story

Site history
- Built: c. 1813

The Lamu Fort (Swahili: Ngome ya Lamu), is a fortification in the town of Lamu in northeastern Kenya. Originally situated on the waterfront, the fort today is located in a central position in the town, about 70 metres (230 ft) from the main jetty on the shore.

Lamu Fort was built between 1813 and 1821 with Omani assistance. Initially it provided a base from which the Omanis consolidated their control of the East African coast but the town later lost its economic importance. During the British colonial period, and after the independence of Kenya, the fort was used as a prison. Today it houses an environmental museum and library, and is often used for community events.

== Building ==
Lamu Fort (Note: Lamu fort should not be confused with the more modern fort at Shela Beach (2.300277°S 40.911583°E), a vacation rental property. This "fort" was built in 2001.) is a defensive structure that was erected at the southeast corner of the old stone town of Lamu. The fort was built beside the Pwani Mosque, the oldest known mosque in Lamu, with origins in the 14th century. The fort originally lay on the waterfront, which then ran along the main street of the town but has since retreated.

Thomas Boteler, who visited Lamu in 1823, described the fort as "a large square building, with a tower at each corner, but constructed so slightly that in all probability the discharge of its honeycombed ordnance would soon bring the whole fabric to the ground." It had a "large vaulted entrance ... [and] consisted of three stories of balconies, supported inside by arches. Captain W. F. W. Owen, who visited at the same time, noted that the fort was "one hundred yards square, and surrounded by walls from forty to fifty feet high."

Today the fort is in a central position in the town. It is situated about 70 metres (230 ft) from the main jetty on the shore. The fort today is a massive two-story stone building. The squat and powerful structure contrasts with the elegant Swahili architecture of the other buildings in the town.

== History ==
Construction of the fort appears to have been started by Fumomadi, Sultan of Pate. The Mazrui leader Abdalla bin Hemed, in an uneasy alliance with Pate, was also involved in the construction. One story was built, but with the death of Funomadi in 1809 construction halted. In 1812 Lamu gained an unexpected victory at the Battle of Shela over the forces of Pate and Mombasa. The continued threat prompted them to call for help from Oman. Said bin Sultan, Sultan of Muscat and Oman (r. 1804–1856), was said to have assisted in the renewed construction, which began in 1813 and was completed around 1821.

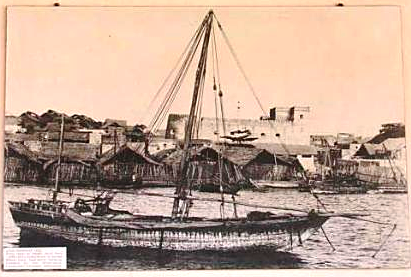
Waterfront of Lamu in 1892, showing Lamu fort. Photograph by Adolph Jacob Hertz (1865–1912)

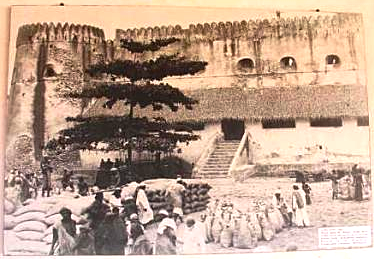
Market outside Lamu fort in 1892. Photograph by Adolph Jacob Hertz (1865–1912)

Sultan Sayyid Said bin Sultan sent a governor to Lamu around 1814. He provided a protective garrison of Baluchi soldiers. According to Boteler, the main guard consisted of "about twenty Muscat soldiers, lounging on the stone benches on either side, with eye intent on vacancy, and armed with their shields, swords and pikes. A large assortment of matchlocks, suspended from the walls above them, resembled those used by the primitive small-arm men in England." However, the security offered by the fort encouraged construction around it during the 19th century, including a shopfront.

The importance of Lamu in the Lamu Archipelago grew at the expense of Pate in the years that followed the fort's construction. The Sultan used Lamu Fort as a base for defeating the Mazrui rebels in Mombasa, and for establishing control over the East African coast. He moved the capital of his sultanate to Zanzibar. With its strategic importance lost, Lamu soon declined in economic importance in comparison to Mombasa and Zanzibar.

Lamu Fort was turned into a prison in 1910 by the British colonial administration. In the 1950s Mau Mau detainees were held in the fort. The fort continued to be used as a prison after the independence of Kenya until 1984. It was then given to the National Museums of Kenya, who converted the fort into a museum with help from the Swedish International Development Cooperation Agency. The Lamu Fort was declared a scheduled monument on 15 May 1984. Restoration was undertaken carefully. A temporary exhibition was opened in 1993.

The fort today includes a museum with an exhibition on the ground floor mainly concerned with environmental conservation. The courtyard is used by the local community for meetings, weddings and public performances. There are offices, laboratories and a workshop on the second floor, and a conference facility that is available for rent. The fort houses a library with an excellent collection of Swahili poetry and reference material on Lamu. The ramparts of the fort give panoramic views of the town.

== 3D Model with Laser-Scanning ==
The Zamani Project document cultural heritage sites in 3D to create a record for future generations. The documentation is based on terrestrial laser-scanning. The 3D documentation of the lamu Fort was carried out in 2006. 3D models, plans and images can be view here
