= Fumo Madi ibn Abi Bakr =

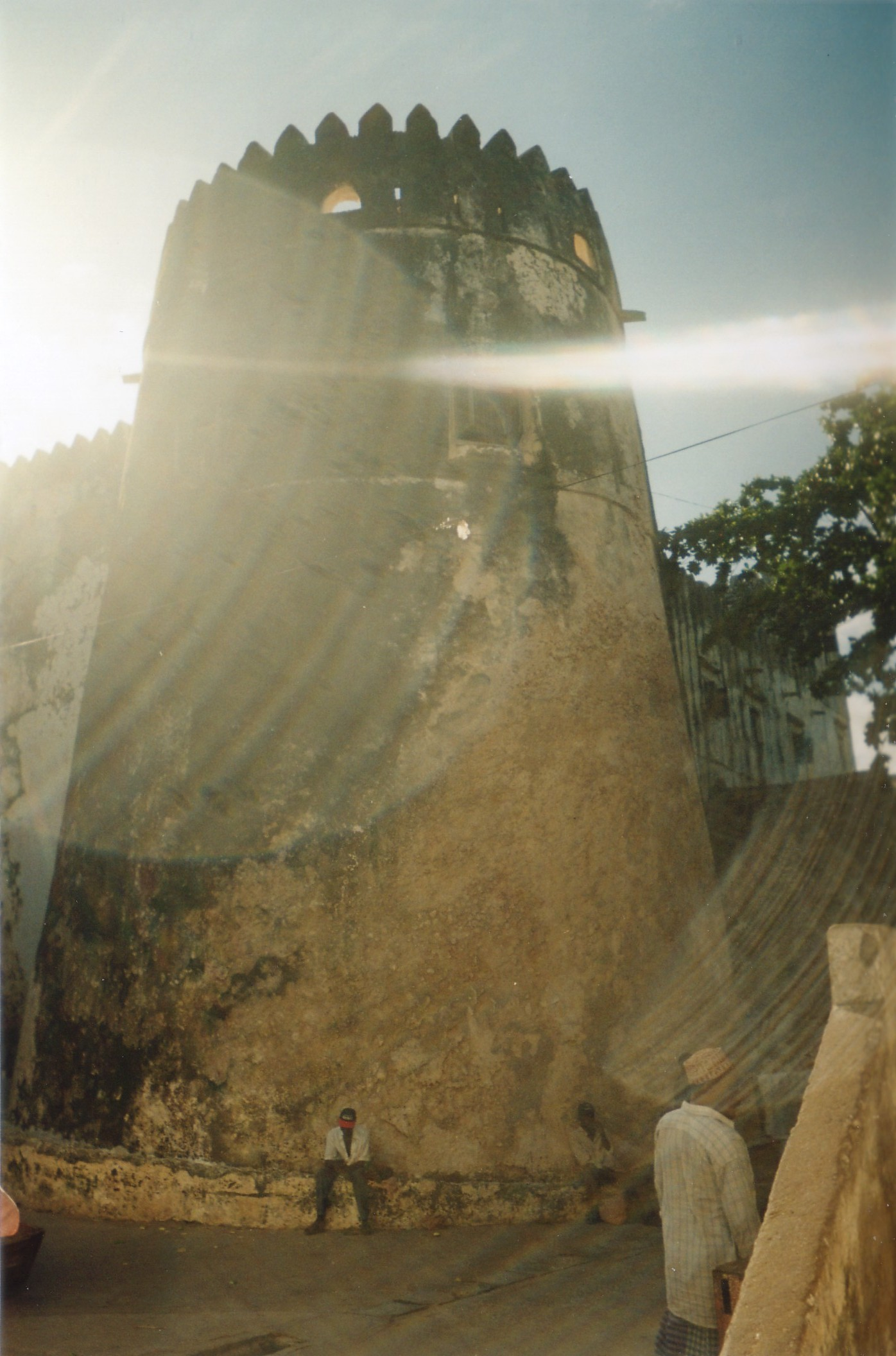
Lamu Fort, in Lamu Town, 2005

Fumo Madi ibn Abi Bakr was Sultan of Pate, Kenya (1779 - 1809). Around 1800 the Pate Sultan took over Lamu, however, they were deeply resented by the people of Lamu. Fumomadi was persuaded ("by a faithful old advisor") to build a fort on the seafront in Lamu Town, to protect members of his government. He died (a natural death) before the first storey of the fort was completed.

There was much disagreement over choosing his successor, as he had fifty children and all sons and male ín-laws were eligible for the throne. After "encouragement" from the powerful Mazrui family from Mombasa/Oman, an in-law named Ahmad ibn Shaykh was chosen as the next Sultan.

== Bibliography ==
- Martin, Chryssee MacCasler Perry and Esmond Bradley Martin: Quest for the Past. An historical guide to the Lamu Archipelago. 1973.
