= Lamu Island =

Port city of Kenya

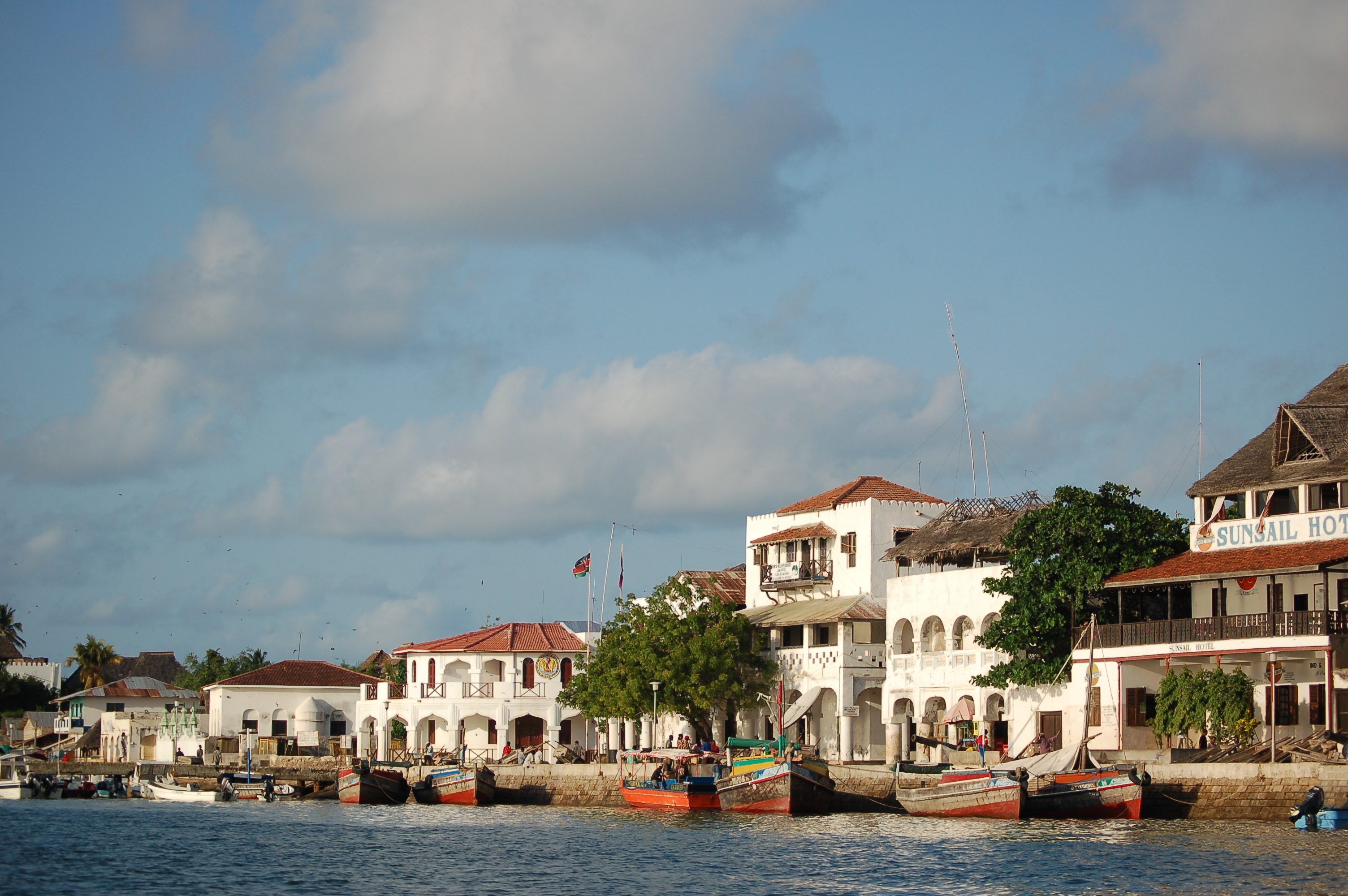
- Lamu town

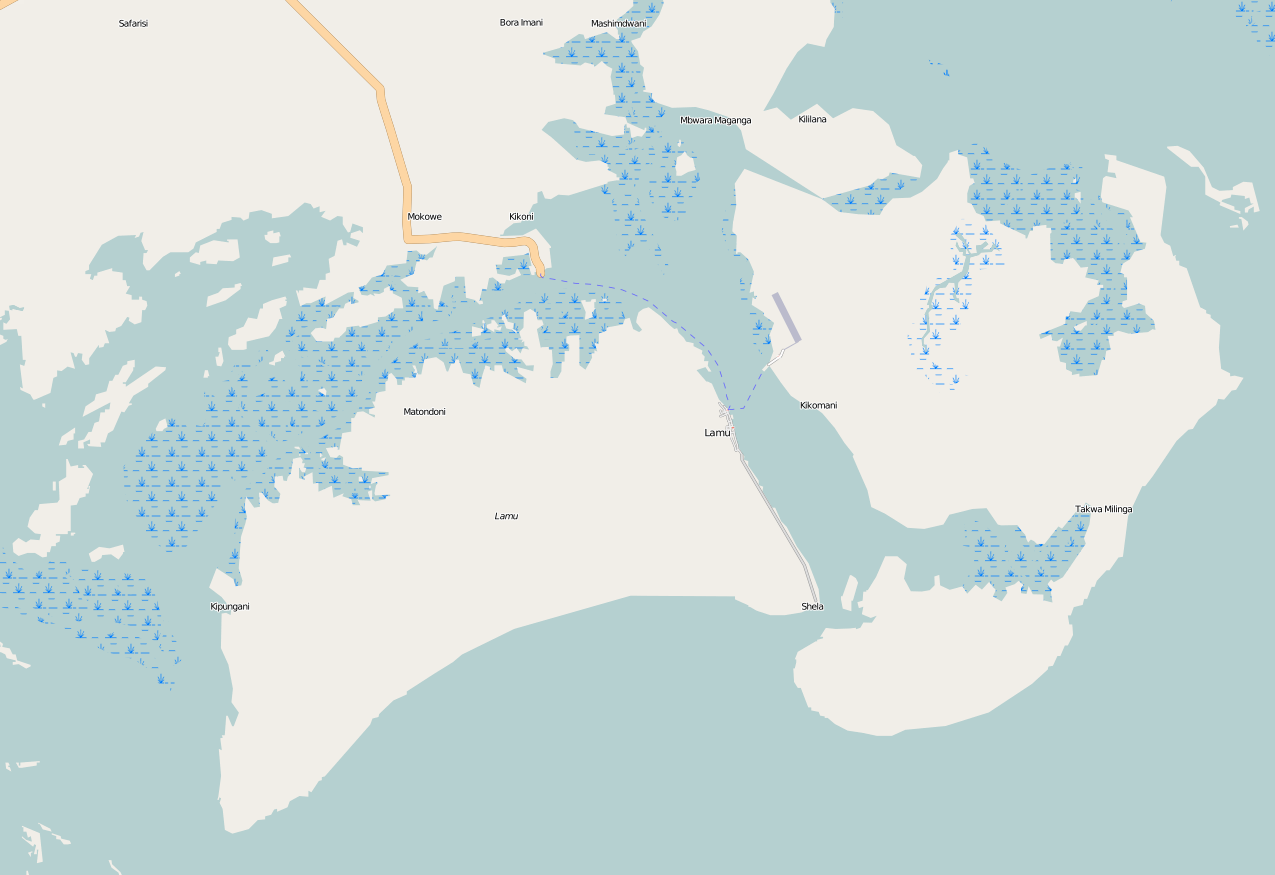
- Lamu Island (left) and Manda Island (right)

- Location within Kenya

Geography
- Location: Indian Ocean
- Coordinates: 2°17′S 40°52′E
- Archipelago: Lamu Archipelago

Administration
- Kenya
- County: Lamu

Lamu Island is a port, city, and island just off the shore of Kenya in the Indian Ocean approximately 240 kilometers from Mombasa. It is a part of the East African country of Kenya. The settlement at Lamu was founded in the 12th century. Lamu is one of the longest-established and best-preserved settlements of the Swahili tradition in East Africa still in existence. The island has continually been inhabited for over seven hundred years, and continues to be an important center in eastern Africa.

== Swahili culture ==
The island of Lamu is a Swahili settlement. Traders and sailors from the Arabian Peninsula, China, India and South-East Asia traveled across the Indian Ocean to the East African Coast to reach the island of Lamu. The diverse mixture of sailors and traders with the native people of the Lamu island created distinguishable social classes. The Swahili language known as Kiswahili has various dialects throughout the island. There are several different social classes that the people living on the island of Lamu are considered to be part of. The different social classes are separated into the following: indigenous people (Wenyeji), foreigners (Wageni), Arabs (Waarabu) and the Africans (Waafrika). These different groups of people all identify themselves differently based on their social status, but another interesting factor that makes these groups unique that is that each social status has a different dialect. The Swahili culture is not a single culture or a way of life, it is yet a mixture of traces from European, African, Arab and Asian traditions and cultures. Since the Island of Lamu was visited by many sailors and travelers in the early years of this island's settlement it was able to become a diverse island. The Swahili culture has a rich history and embraces all parts of the society on the island of Lamu.

Because of the small winding roads on the Island, residents are forced to walk via foot or by donkey to get to wherever they are going. The use of cars for the general public is banned. The weather in this region is generally warm ranging from about 23 and 33 °C. Experiencing the warmest weather from December to April and the coldest weather from May to July. A port was founded on the island of Lamu by Arab traders at least as early as the fourteenth century, when the Pwani Mosque was built. The island prospered on the slave trade. After defeating Pate Island in the nineteenth century, the island became a local power, but it declined after the British forced the closure of the slave markets in 1873. In 1890 the island became part of Zanzibar and remained obscure until Kenya was granted independence from Great Britain in 1963. Tourism developed from the 1970s, mainly around the eighteenth century Swahili architecture and traditional culture.

Along its southern coastline the area of Lamu island is composed of mainly sand dunes, which cover the Shela aquifer which is responsible for the islands main source of water.

Kenya, South Sudan and Ethiopia have launched the controversial LAPSSET development project to build a port, oil refinery and rail network near the island of Lamu, the Lamu Port and Lamu-Southern Sudan-Ethiopia Transport Corridor.

== Settlements ==
=== Lamu Old Town ===
In Lamu Old Town, the principal inhabited part of the island, is one of the oldest and best-preserved Swahili settlements in East Africa. This city has had civilians living in it for over seven hundred years, while most of the other East African settlements along the coast do not have inhabitants. Due to Lamu's history in trading gold, spices, and slaves, Lamu is truly a melting pot of different cultures and Arabic, Persian, Indian, European, and Swahili traditions that are in evidently on display in Lamu's Architecture. Lamu is an important center for trade because it is the most important trade center in East Africa. People migrated from various lands and from various cultures to conduct trade at the port of Lamu, the abundance of a diversity of people trading at the island of Lamu impacted the future culture of this island. Not only did the traders help the economy of Lamu grow, but it also gave the local people the opportunity to adopt different customs as their own. Because of this, Lamu is also an important cultural, technological, and religious center in Eastern Africa. Lamu has hosted major Muslim religious festivals since the 19th century, and has become a significant center for the study of Islamic and Swahili cultures which scholars from both traditions studying in Lamu. Most evident tradition in Lamu however is the Swahili. In falling characteristically with the Swahili culture, most of the town is built with coral stone and mangrove timber. The town is characterized by the simplicity of structural forms enriched by such features as inner courtyards, verandas, and elaborately carved wooden doors. It is also uniquely Swahili in that the town is spatially organized and is littered with narrow winding streets.

=== Shela ===
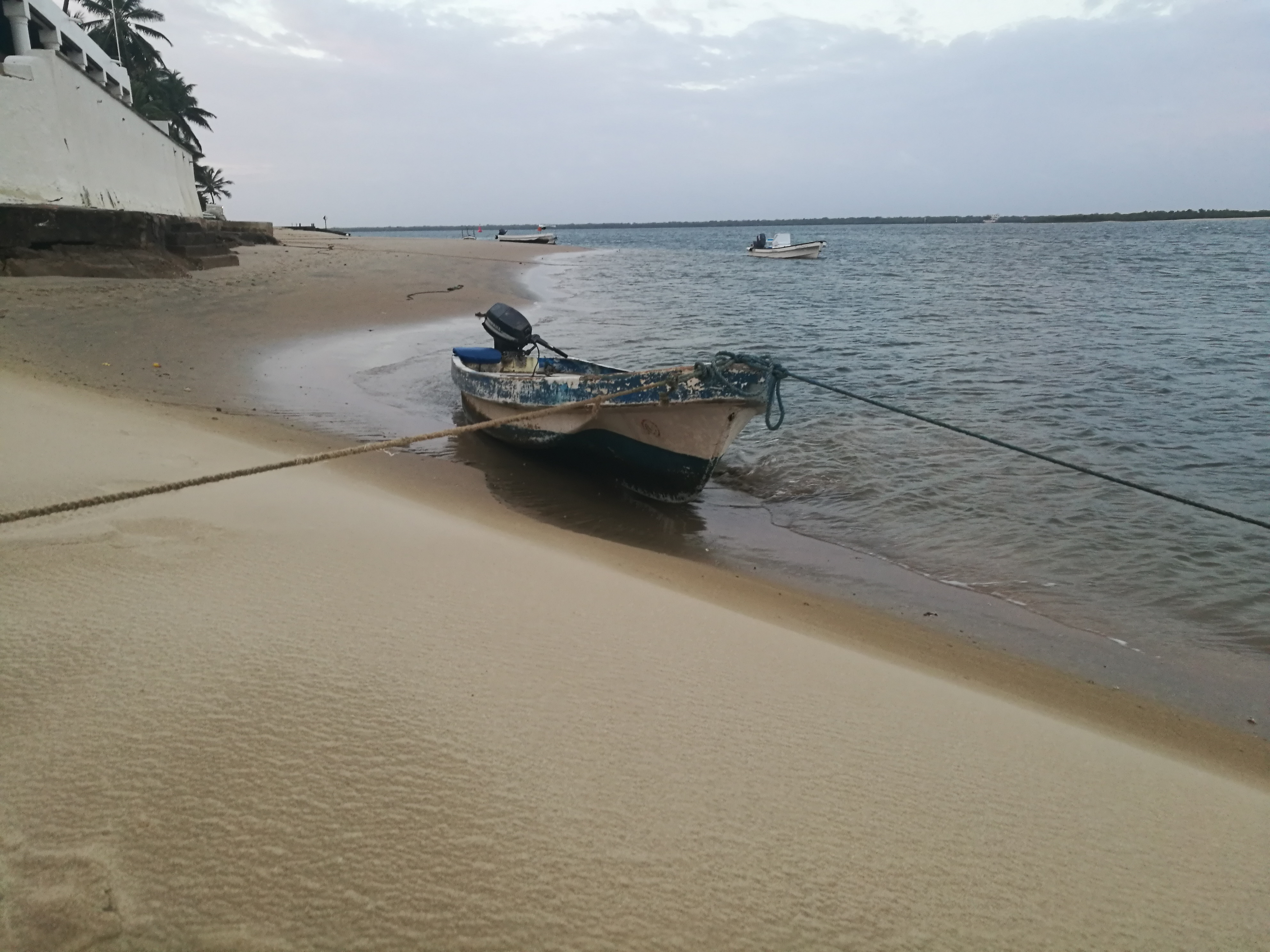
Anchored boat in Shela Village

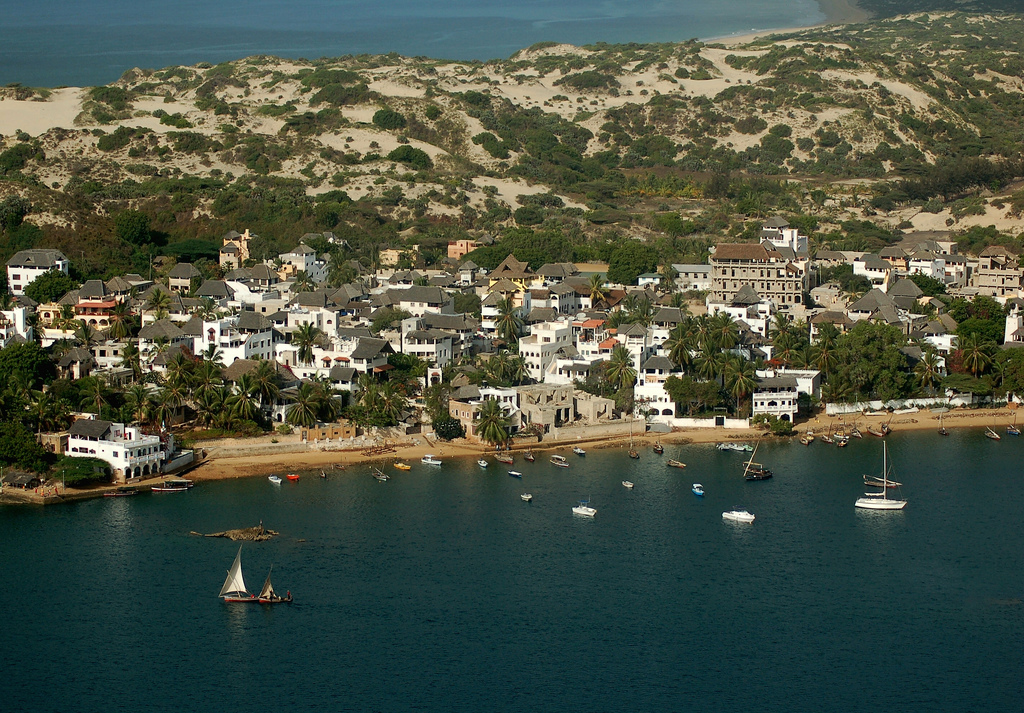
Shela

Shela is a village about 3.2 km (2.0 mi) south of Lamu (town). The origin of the village is unknown, but according to tradition, it was settled by people from nearby Manda Island. In 1813, the elite of Pate Island, allied with the Mazrui clan from Oman, attempted to subjugate Lamu in the Battle of Shela. This attempt failed totally, and the defeat of Pate at Shela signalled the rise of Lamu as the leading power in the archipelago. Shela's golden age was from 1829 to 1857, when five of its six mosques were constructed. It is especially known for the Friday mosque. A 3D documentation based on terrestrial laser-scanning done by the Zamani Project of the Shela Mosque (Friday Mosque) was carried out in 2006. A 3D model, a Panorama tour, plans and images can be view here.

Shela is now a centre for tourism on the island, with several guest houses featured by the coast. Shela is also home to the most spectacular beaches on Lamu island, which were damaged during the tsunami caused by the 2004 Indian Ocean earthquake. The appearance of the area is much more in keeping with the imagined East African coastline, with its almost pure white sand, traditional dhows, and clean appearance. It makes a sharp contrast to Lamu town (directly opposite the airstrip on Manda) which lacks a beach and functions as a relatively busy port.

Chris Hanley as well as Sienna Miller own houses in Shela.

=== Matondoni ===
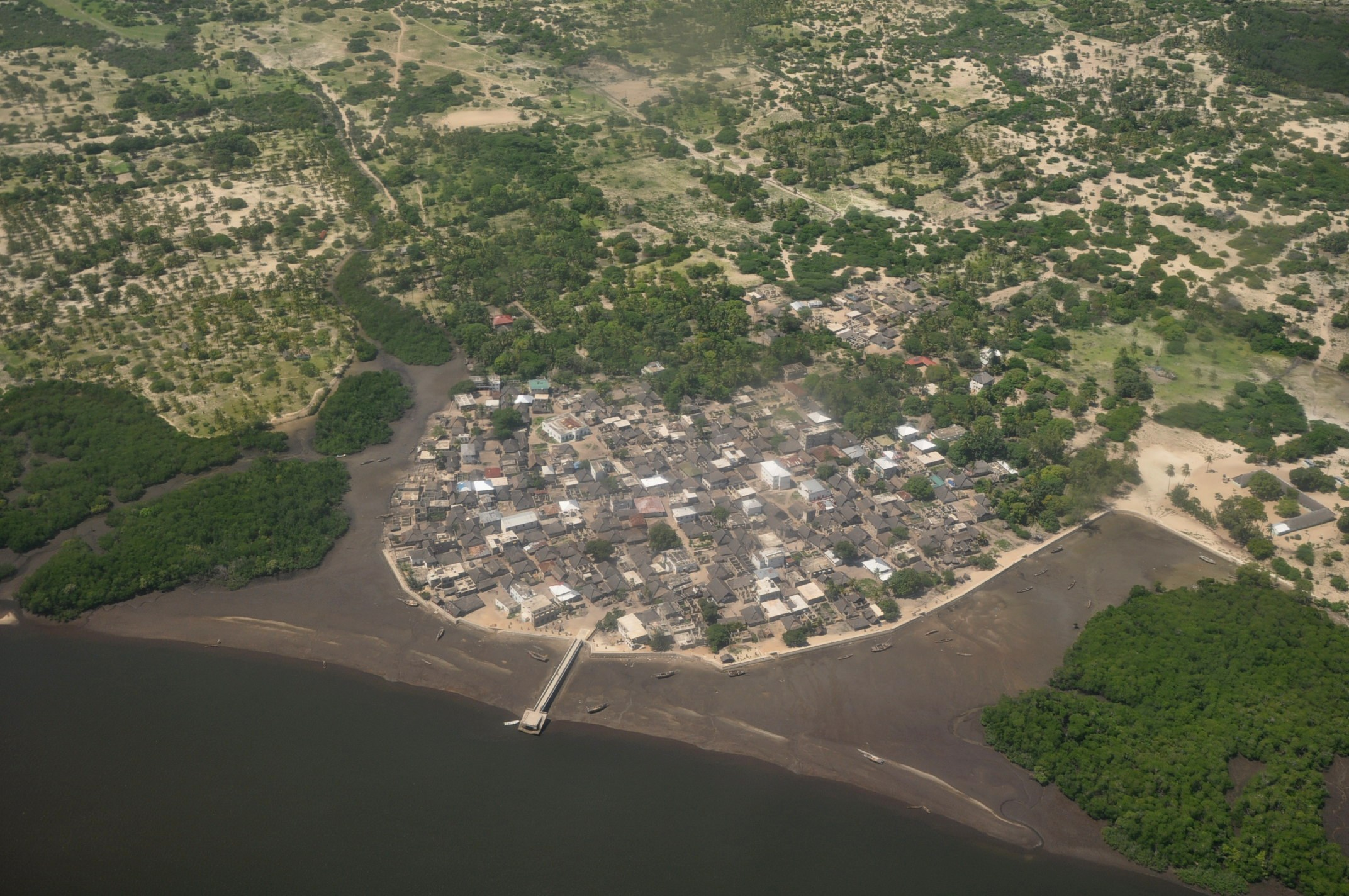
Matondoni

Known for the building and repairing of dhows, Matondoni lies at the northwest coast of the island, 7.3 km (4.5 mi) west of Lamu (town). The locals of this village are best known for building dhows. With the increasing use of speedboats, the production of dhows is starting to decrease. Now smaller dhows are created for fishing for smaller fish. There are several hundred-people living on in the village of Matondoni; the natives live in thatched huts and use mud for daily life. The village has a modern jetty.

=== Kipungani ===
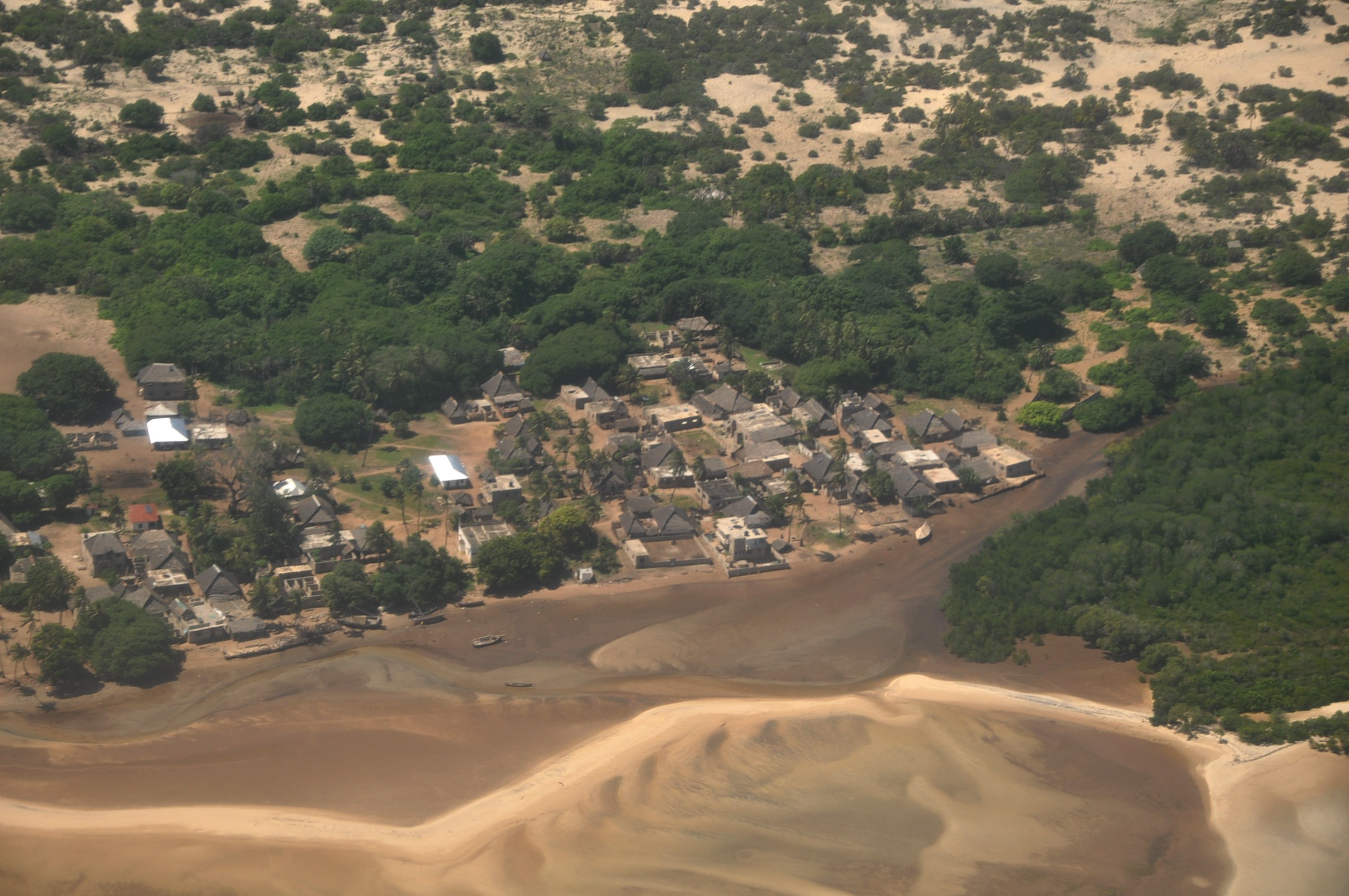
Kipungani

This is a small village on the southwestern coast of the island. With the white sand beaches, this village is a popular tourist attraction. While staying in the village of Kipungani, tourists are given the options to engage in activities such as snorkeling, deep sea game fishing, and wandering the village for sight-seeing. Locals here create straw mats, baskets, hats and kifumbu (woven strainer), used to squeeze milk from mashed coconut.

== Present day ==
Michael W. Smith featured a song about visiting the island called "Lamu" on his 1986 album The Big Picture. A different version is featured on Smith's 1987 live album The Live Set. In 2001, Lamu was designated a United Nations Education, Scientific and Cultural Organization or UNESCO site. Centuries ago the island of Lamu was highly dependent on the function of slavery in its economy, since abolishment of slavery the island has looked for other ways to bring wealth back into its economy. With the diverse cultural and colorful design of Lamu, it is a place of interest for tourists drawn to the East African Coast. The economy of the island of Lamu depends on foreigners coming to the island to experience the local lifestyle and be part of the local culture. As of recent, Lamu has entered a new phase of becoming a popular tourist location in Eastern Africa.

== See also ==
- Lamu Port and Lamu-Southern Sudan-Ethiopia Transport Corridor
- Swahili culture
- Kore people
- Sokoke
