= Maktaba Awards =

Annual event for libraries in Kenya

The Maktaba Awards, or Kenyan Library of the Year Awards, is an annual event organised by the Goethe-Institute Kenya, the Kenya Library Association (KLA), and the Jomo Kenyatta Foundation (JKF), to recognize excellence in Kenyan library services.

Established in 2010, the awards are the first of their kind in Sub-Saharan Africa, and also seek to promote quality library services and promote a reading culture in Kenya.

The Best Performing Libraries are ranked based on areas such as relevance of their collection, integration of modern ICT in their services, effective customer service, as we as community Services such as public events or programmes to promote reading.

According to the organizers, access to information is a key catalyst in the realization of Kenya's Vision 2030.

Some of the Libraries that have been recognised in the Maktaba Awards include: The Kenya National Library (KNLS),Knowledge Empowering Youth (KEY), United States International University (USIU), Agakhan University, among others.

The winners of each category and the overall winner, "Library of the Year," are chosen by an independent jury. The price is to be used for a measure in favour of the acknowledged library.
