= Kenya National Library Service =

Corporate body of the Kenyan government

Kenya National Library Service (KNLS)

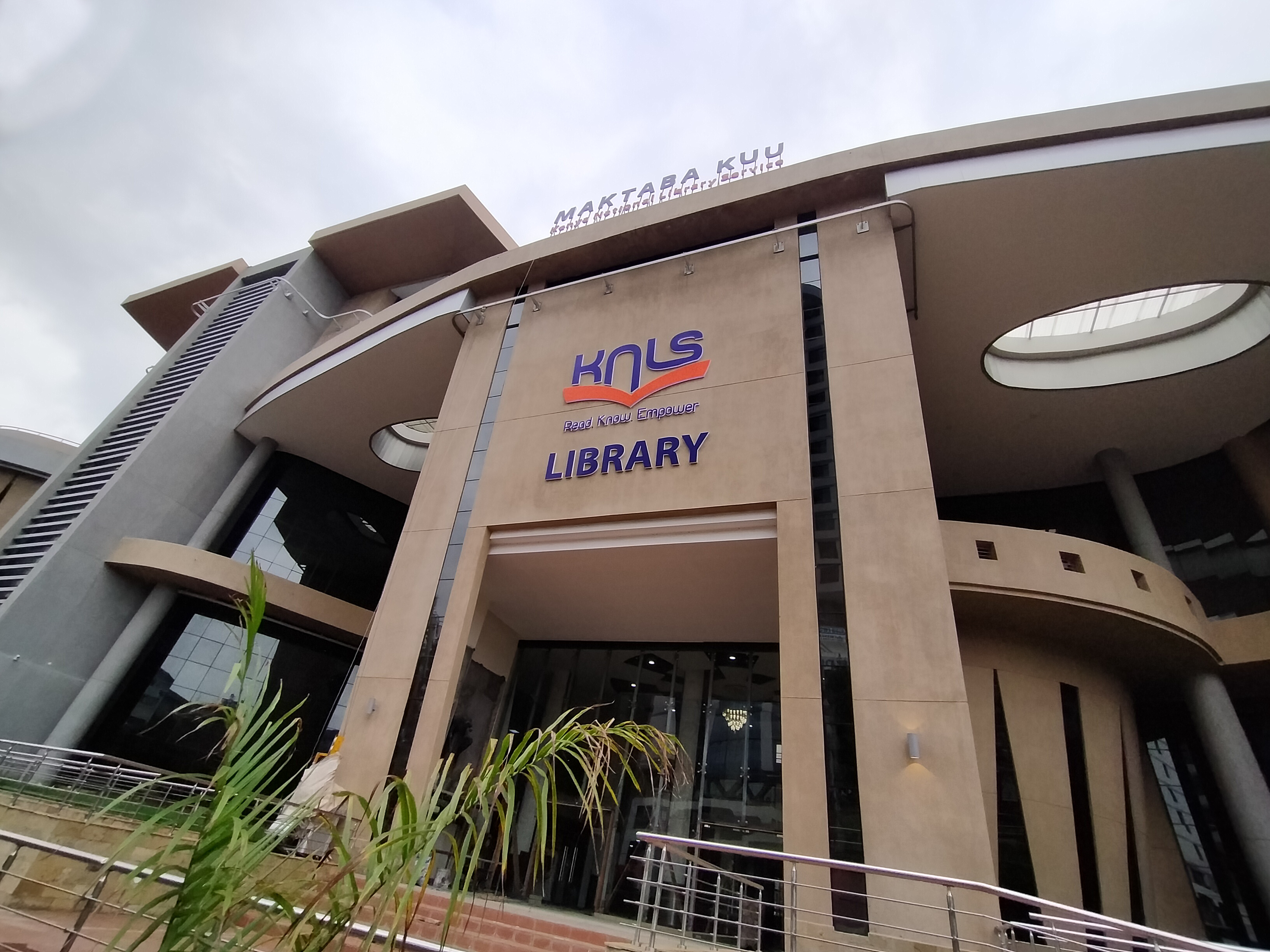
- Location: Nairobi, Kenya
- Type: National Library
- Established: 1965
- Reference to legal mandate: Laws of Kenya Cap 225 of April 1965
- Branches: 3

Collection
- Items collected: Books, periodicals, encyclopedias, newspapers, journals, magazines, Braille materials, audio books, audio navigators for the blind, charts, maps and e-resources
- Size: 1.4M books
- Criteria for collection: Preservation of the National Imprint
- Legal deposit: Yes

Access and use
- Access requirements: Access through entry fee or registered membership for adults. Children have free access.
- Population served: 16M
- Members: Est 75,000

Other information
- Director: Dr. Charles Nzivo
- Employees: Est 650
- Website: www.knls.ac.ke (Automated Accessibility Score = 3.2 decimal)

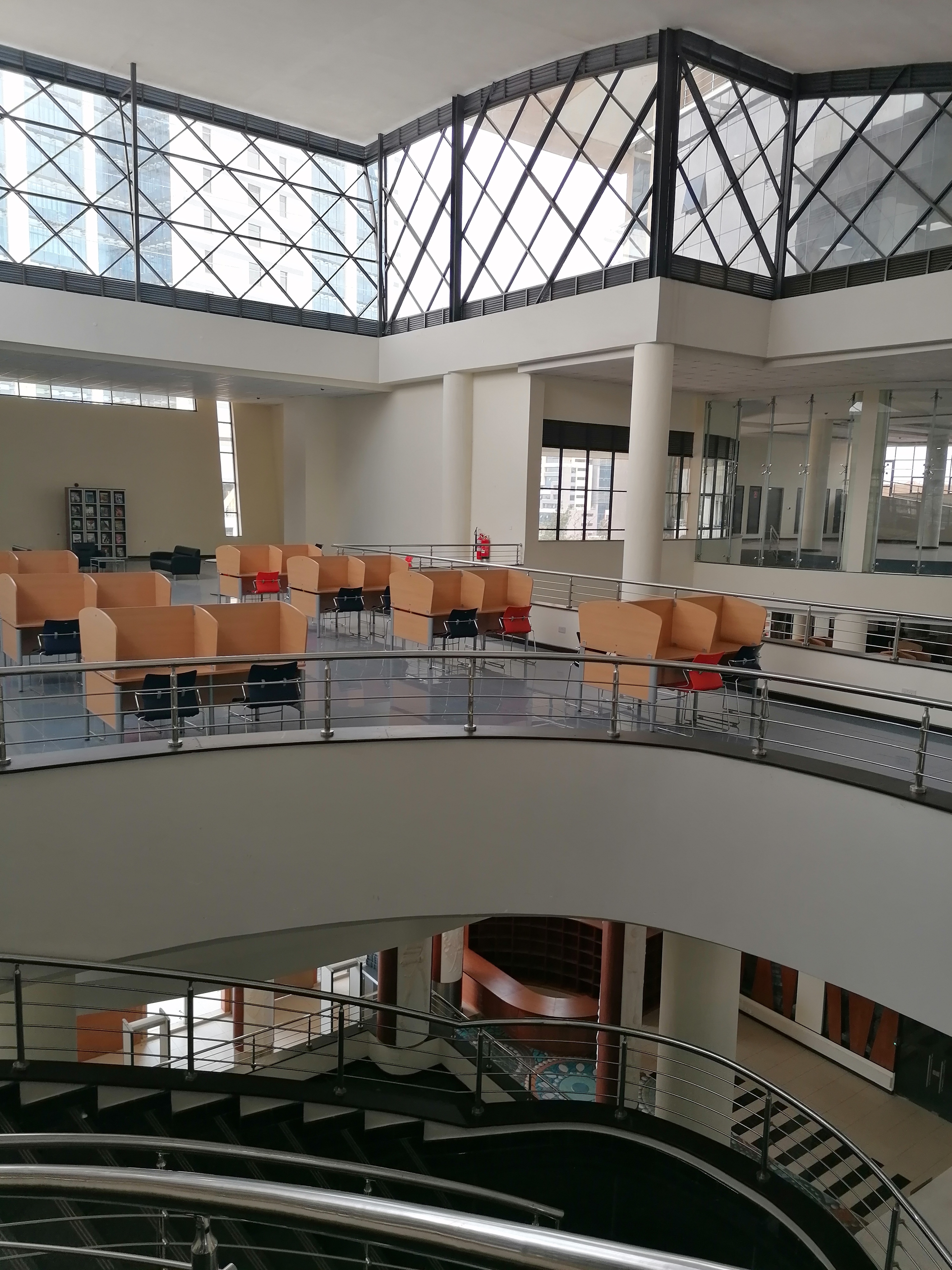
Reading area

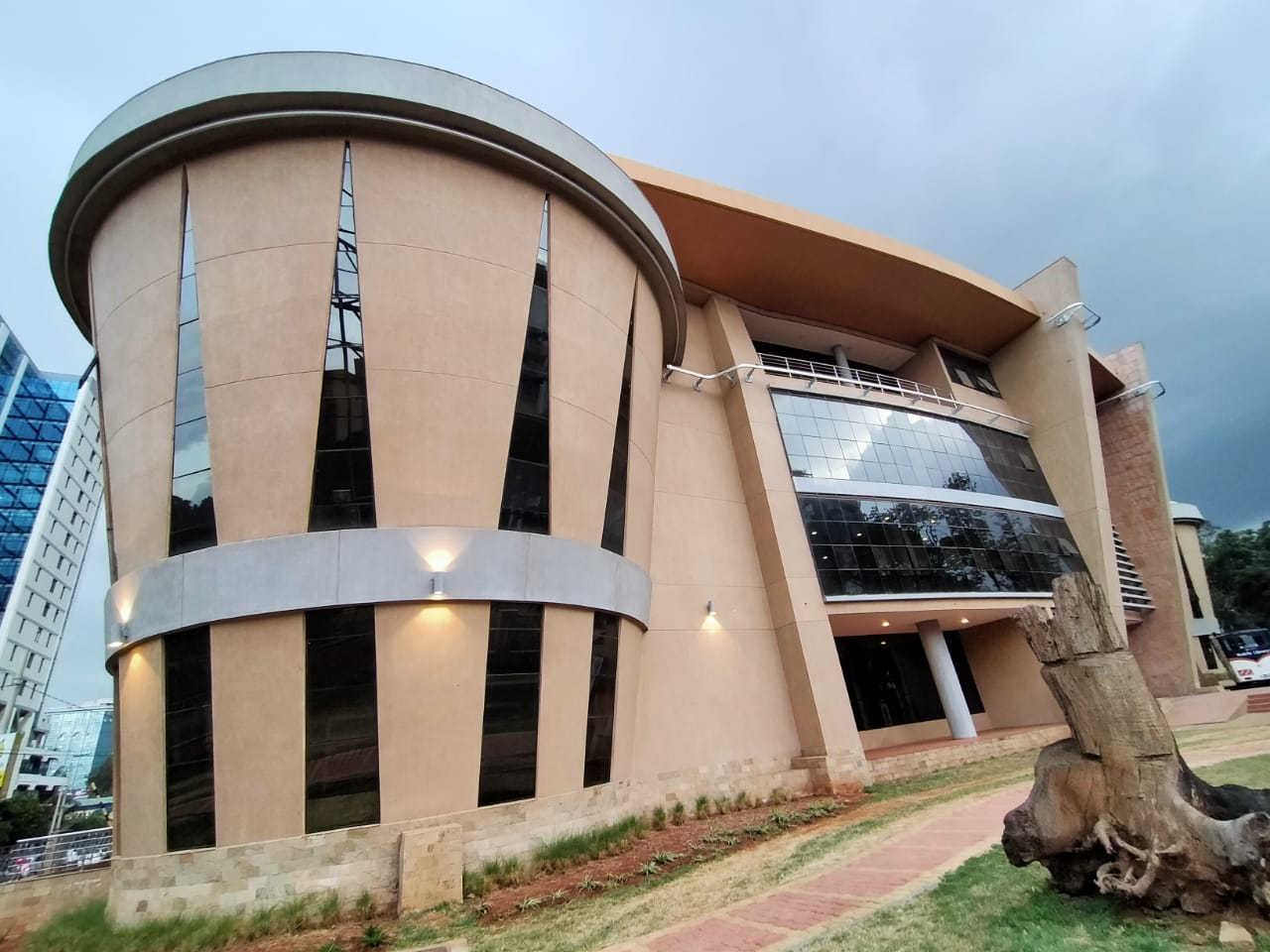
Maktaba Kuu Building

The Kenya National Library Service (KNLS) is a Government State Corporation, established by the KNLS Board Act Cap 225 of the Laws of Kenya in 1965 – revised [Act No. 12 of 1984]. KNLS’ headquarters is at Maktaba Kuu Building located in Upper Hill Nairobi and has two other facilities at Buruburu in the Eastland Areas of Nairobi, and Nakuru in Nakuru County. KNLS also manages the virtual library https://vtabu.knls.ac.ke/ to allow the public wide access to information resources and sources.

Currently, the Kenya National Library Service is managed by the government under the Ministry of Gender, Culture and Children Services.

== National Library Services in Kenya ==
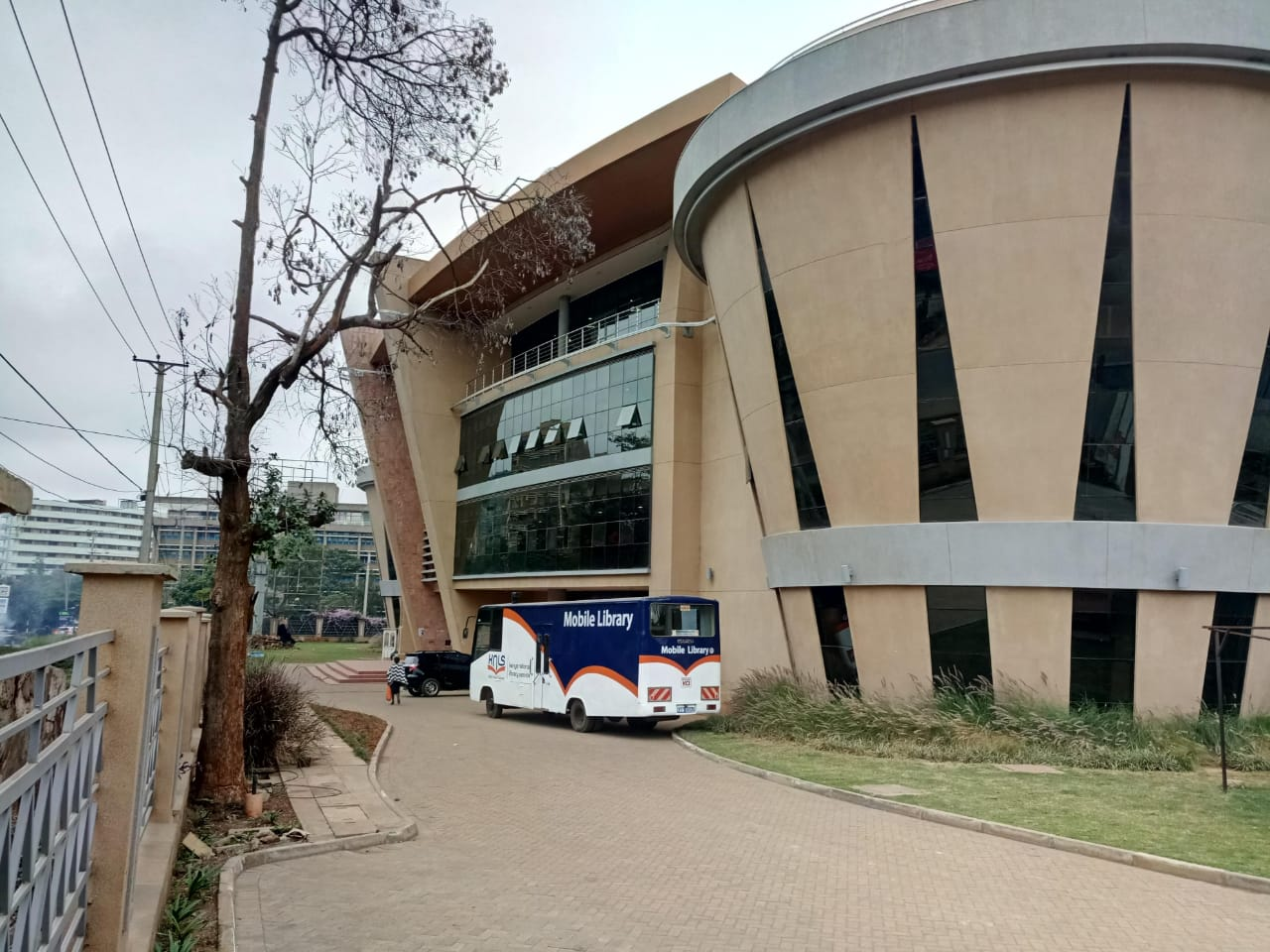
KNLS library

National library services in Kenya are offered by Kenya National Library Service. It serves as the repository for legal deposits in accordance with the Books and Newspapers Act Chapter (CAP) 111 of the laws of Kenya which facilitates the preservation of books, magazines, and other publications produced in the country.

According to books and newspaper Act (CAP 111) statute law, Miscellaneous Amendment No. 22 of 1989, the publishers of every book printed and published in Kenya "shall before or within fourteen days after publication of the book, at his own expense deliver to the Registrar such number of copies thereof, not exceeding three in number. And in order to facilitate the publication of the national bibliography of Kenya under 4 (k) of the Kenya National Library Service Board Act, before or within fourteen days, deliver to the Director, Kenya National Library Service, two copies.

The Kenya National Library Service is charged with annually publishing the Kenya National Bibliography which contains a list of bibliographic resources, print or audio-visual acquired as legal deposit. The bibliography was first proposed in 1975. Kenya National Bibliography is published annually by the National Library and contains list of bibliographic resources, print or audio-visual acquired as legal deposit. The Legal Deposit Act mandates publishers and authors, to deposit two copies of their published information materials to the Director National library and three copies to the registrar of books and newspapers. All these materials are then published in the Kenya National Bibliography (KNB). The organization maintains a database of Kenya's intellectual output with the aim of achieving effective National Bibliographic Control in line with the principle of Universal Bibliographic Control. Kenya National Bibliography serves as a selection tool for scholars, lecturers, students', librarians among others. National Libraries over the ages have been potent instrument for creation, acquisition and dissemination of local content thereby preserving and promoting transmission of cultural practices and values from one generation to another. They are reservoir of recorded knowledge of a community, which is being preserved for posterity. The bibliography was last published in 2018.

The National Library Division is also the sole issuer of International Standard Book Numbers (ISBN) and International Standard Music Numbers (ISMN) for print and music. knls subscribes to thousands of e-journals, e-books and other e-resource sites and has a stock of specialized collection of government publications dating back to 1980. In addition it also acts as a data information centre for the World Bank.

== History ==
Public libraries in Kenya have existed since the beginning of the 18th century. These however, were mainly subscription libraries that relied heavily on endowments, members' subscriptions and limited grants from both local and central government. The libraries were exclusively for Europeans and Asians.

The first public library, Seif Bin Salim Public Library and Free Reading Area, in Mombasa, was established in 1903. It was financed by Seif Bin Salim, the son of the then "Liwali" (Arab Governor) of Mombasa, Salim bin Khalfan. The McMillan Memorial Library in Nairobi was the second public library. It was built in 1931 in memory of Lord William Northrop Mcmillan who was among the first settlers in Kenya. The library was built through funding from the Carnegie Corporation of New York through the efforts of Macmillan's widow, Lucie. Initially, the library was meant for Europeans and Asians. The third public library was the Desai Memorial Library which was built in 1942. It only offered services exclusively to Asians until the 1960s.

In the late 1950s and 1960s, the British Council and the American Cultural Centre provided limited public library services across racial lines. These libraries did not cater for the information needs of the Africans until after independence. Following the recommendations of the East African Library Association and the report of Sidney Hockey, a British Council Library consultant in 1948, Elspeth Huxley who was an author, journalist, broadcaster, environmentalist and government advisor of the colonial government in Kenya.

In 1960, a report recommending a centralized state-supported public library system for Kenya was made. That same year, The Macmillan Memorial Library was handed over to the Nairobi City Council, which opened it to everyone. During this same period, the Desai Library was also opened to the general public.

In 1965, an act establishing Kenya National Library Service was passed.

Provision of information for development through the national and public library network enables people to fight poverty deprivation and illiteracy and thus supports reading and recovery programs by the government. Rural and urban poor communities are better able to tackle their problems and introduce social change if they have access to relevant information that meets their needs and interests. In addition, access to information about the country enables citizens to participate effectively in the art of governance.

Through various reading campaigns, knls provides opportunities for communities to enhance their reading and information seeking habits, and therefore sustain literacy. The 2006 Kenya National Adult Literacy Survey estimated the national literacy rate at 61.5% indicating that only 38.5% Kenyan adults were illiterate. The survey also revealed that only 29.6% of the adult population had acquired the desired mastery level of literacy. This meant that the majority of those termed as literate (61.5%) were at risk of losing their literacy skills or could not effectively perform within the context of knowledge economies.

However, a country with effective library and information services will achieve continuity in learning and reading beyond the formal school program. Such systems cannot be explained any better than ensuring that library services are accessible to as many Kenyans as possible throughout the country. Public libraries go beyond formal education and they are at the heart of personal and community development. knls promotes reading by providing access to relevant reading materials to all communities. Libraries play a major role in stimulating public interest in books and in promoting reading for knowledge, information and enjoyment – thus knls is indeed a "people's university."

== Transfer to the Counties ==
The amalgamation of the Constitution of Kenya 2010, presented a significant opportunity to clearly distinguish between the roles of the Kenya National Library Service from those of the Public Library System. The public libraries were listed as a devolved function in Schedule 4 of the Constitution, and thus, the 61 (former KNLS) branch libraries were transferred to the county Governments with effect from 1 July 2023.

== Core functions of Kenya National Library Service ==
  1. Develop a national policy, legislation, and set Norms and standards for the library sector.
  2. Capacity building and technical assistance to the county governments.
  3. Carry out and promote research in the development of libraries and related services
  4. Promote literacy in the country.
  5. Domesticate international standards.
  6. Publish Kenya National Bibliography (KNB) and Kenya Periodical Directory (KPD)
  7. Establish the national WebCat comprising catalogs for all libraries
  8. Provide a national library reference and referral service

== Services ==
The library offers the following services;

- Mobile library services
- Advisory on library services
- Research & Consultancy
- Free access to computers and Internet connectivity
- Health information
- Services to visually impaired persons
- User education
- Digitization services
- Board games for users above 14 years old
- Data center services
- Virtual Library services The library also offers eBooks that can be accessed online

== Current knls facilities ==
- Maktaba Kuu, Upper Hill
- Buruburu
- Nakuru

== Former knls Network Libraries ==
| No. | County | No. of libraries | Area situated |
|---|---|---|---|
| 1 | Baringo | 3 | Kabarnet, Meisori, Eldama Ravine |
| 2 | Bomet | 1 | Silibwet |
| 3 | Bungoma | 1 | Kimilili |
| 5 | Elgeyo/Marakwet | 1 | Lagam |
| 6 | Embu | 1 | Embu |
| 7 | Garissa | 3 | Garissa, Mbalambala, Masalani |
| 9 | Isiolo | 1 | Isiolo |
| 11 | Kakamega | 2 | Kakamega, Lusumu |
| 12 | Kericho | 1 | Kericho |
| 13 | Kiambu | 1 | Thika |
| 14 | Kilifi | 3 | Kilifi, Dzitsoni, Malindi |
| 16 | Kisii | 1 | Kisii |
| 17 | Kisumu | 2 | Kisumu, Koru (Dr. Robert Ouko Memorial Library) |
| 18 | Kitui | 1 | Mwingi |
| 20 | Laikipia | 2 | Nanyuki, Rumuruti |
| 23 | Makueni | 3 | Mutyambua, Kinyambu, Kithasyu |
| 24 | Mandera | 1 | Mandera |
| 25 | Marsabit | 1 | Moyale |
| 26 | Meru | 4 | Meru, Mikumbune, Timau, Gatimbi |
| 27 | Migori | 1 | Awendo |
| 28 | Mombasa | 1 | Mombasa |
| 29 | Murang'a | 2 | Murang'a, Kangema |
| 30 | Nairobi | 1 | Kibera |
| 31 | Nakuru | 2 | Naivasha, Gilgil |
| 33 | Narok | 2 | Narok, Lelechonik |
| 35 | Nyandarua | 1 | Ol Kalou |
| 36 | Nyeri | 4 | Nyeri, Munyu, Chinga, Karatina |
| 38 | Siaya | 3 | Nyilima, Rambula, Ukwala |
| 39 | Taita Taveta | 3 | Wundanyi, Voi, Werugha (Mary Patch Turnbull Memorial Library) |
| 44 | Uasin Gishu | 1 | Eldoret |
| 46 | Wajir | 5 | Wajir, Griftu, Habasweni, Tarbaj, Bute |
| | TOTAL | 61 | |

== See also ==
- List of libraries in Kenya
- Book Aid International
- Royal Library of Alexandria
