= Pate Chronicle =

Book on Swahili history

The Pate Chronicle (or The Book of the Kings of Pate) is a history of Pate Island and its rulers from the Middle Ages down to the early 20th century that survives only in fragments and excerpts. Nevertheless, it is widely considered "the single most important indigenous source for Swahili history". All surviving versions are in Swahili written in Arabic script. Although it has been suggested that the original may have been Arabic, no Arabic text survives.

== Content ==
The Chronicle ignores the foundation of Pate and begins with the arrival of members of the Nabhani dynasty in the year 600 AH (that is, 1203–1204 AD). It describes the reigns of 32 Nabhani sovereigns in chronological order. The preceding native dynasty is called the Batawiyyūn, which simply means "those of Pate". The first Nabhani king of Pate is Sulaymān ibn Sulaymān ibn Muẓaffar al-Nabahānī, previously a sultan in Arabia and who married the daughter of the last king of the Batawiyyūn.

The Chronicle's historical reliability is considered mixed. Some of its claims have been corroborated by archaeology, but Neville Chittick claimed that "many or most of the events described in the early part have no historicity whatever". It is not an objective history but was designed to legitimize the claims of the ruling dynasty. It may have been intended originally as an aide-mémoire to oral tradition or as a sourcebook, given its somewhat indiscriminate collection of data. One of the Chronicle's more fantastic claims is that Pate conquered the whole coast as far as the Quirimbas Islands. Shungwaya is described as one for the cities conquered but otherwise plays no role in the Chronicle.

== Manuscripts ==
An original lost manuscript from which all existing versions descend is generally assumed. Muhammad bin Furno 'Umar Nabahani, called Bwana Kitini, had memorized the text and recited it to Chauncey Hugh Stigand, but did not allow Stigand to see the manuscript. In 1913, Stigand became the first to publish a version of the Chronicle, an English translation. It is the longest extant version and possibly the closest to the original. All surviving versions go back in some way to Bwana Kitini. In 1903, on the orders of the liwali of Lamu, Bwana Kitini made a copy of the text now known as the Hollis manuscript. This text was in the Kiamu (Lamu) dialect of Swahili. Alice Werner made an Arabic transcription and an English translation, published in 1914.

Alfred Voeltzkow made a German summary of the Chronicle before World War I, while Wilhelm Wassmuss acquired two manuscripts in Mombasa, which were published in facsimile, transcription and German translation in 1928. These manuscripts were in the Kimvita (Mombasa) and Kiamu dialects of Swahili.

In addition, copies are found in manuscritps 177, 321, 344 and 35 of the library of the University of Dar es Salaam, all in the Kiamu dialect.

== Bibliography ==
- Cenzer, Matthew A. (1994). "Review of Tolmacheva 1993". Sudanic Africa. 5: 270–273. JSTOR 25653255.
- Tolmacheva, Marina, ed. (1993). The Pate Chronicle. Michigan State University Press. doi:10.14321/j.ctt9qf551.
