= Pate Island =

Kenyan island in the Indian Ocean

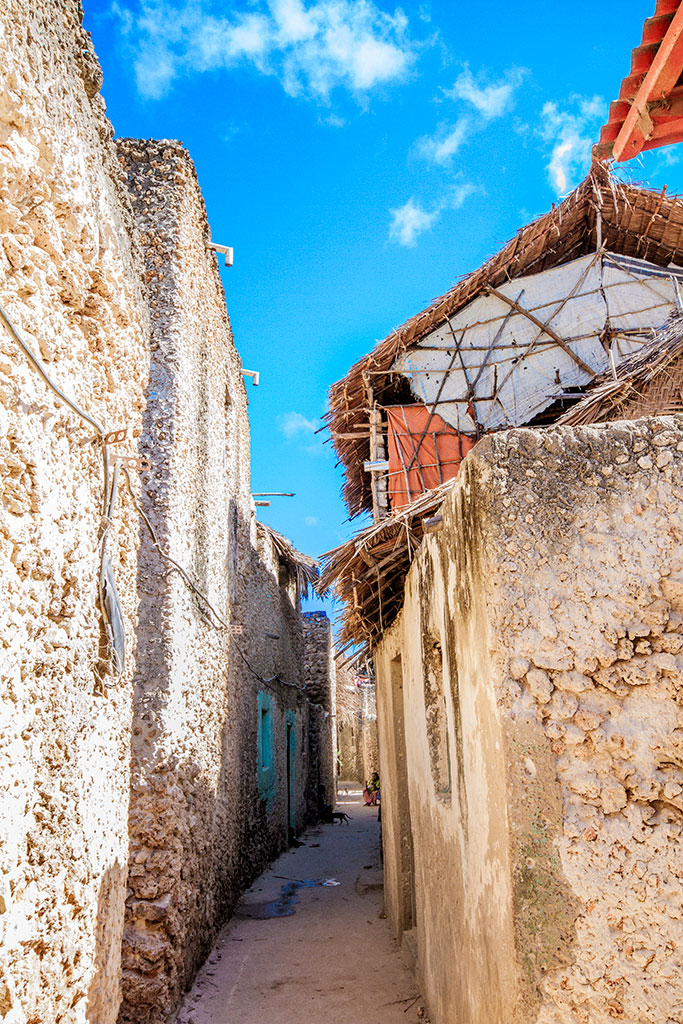
- The narrow streets of Pate town are similar to those in other towns on the island

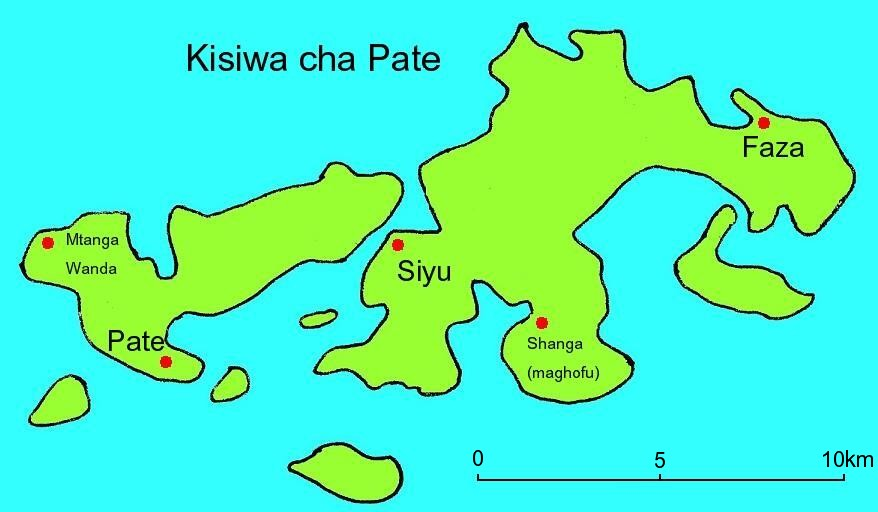
- Map of Pate island

- Location in Kenya

Geography
- Location: Indian Ocean
- Coordinates: 2°06′S 41°03′E
- Archipelago: Lamu Archipelago

Administration
- Kenya

Pate (Paté) Island (Swahili pronunciation: [ˈpate]) is located in the Indian Ocean, off the northern coast of Kenya. It is the largest island in the Lamu Archipelago, which lies between the towns of Lamu and Kiunga in the former Coast Province. The island is almost completely surrounded by mangroves.

Like much of the Swahili Coast, Pate's history was marked by a steady transition from agricultural communities in the early first millennium into a specialized, urban trading society around the 10th century, likely earlier. Islam spread down the coast from African Muslims in the Horn of Africa, helping to develop what would be known as the Swahili culture. Despite myths to the contrary, Pate was neither an Arab nor Persian colony, but an African town frequented by trading Arabs, Persians, Indians, and others. It was the centre of the Pate sultanate from the 13th–19th centuries. The Swahili port of Pate long vied with Lamu and Takwa (on Manda Island) for economic dominance of the area, and came into prominence around the 14th century. It was subjugated by Lamu, however, in the late 19th century.

Public transportation is provided by a few mini buses (known as matatus). The main administrative centre on the island, with the police station, is in Faza.

== Faza ==
Plan of the Island of Paté on the east coast of Africa, by Capt: D. Crichton, 1751 - 25 July 1774

Faza town, on the North coast, known by the name of Ampaza by the Portuguese, dates back at least to the 14th century. In 1587, the Portuguese destroyed Faza, because the local Sheikh had supported Mir Ali Bey, a notorious privateer who had earlier played a key role in ousting the Portuguese from Muscat. The Portuguese arrived from Goa with some 650 men on their punitive expedition, and unleashed their fury on Faza. Everybody they could find was killed, including the local Sheikh. The Portuguese preserved his head in a barrel of salt for display in India. After four days of looting they invited Faza's arch-rivals from Pate town to take away anything that they liked from Faza.

Faza was later resettled. The Portuguese in Faza constructed a chapel there, however, nothing remains of it. In the 18th century Faza again fell into decline due to the rise of Pate. The English Consul Holmwood visited the place in 1873 and found it "dirty and infected with diseases".

== Pate Town ==
The Pate Sultanate was a sultanate from at least the beginning of the 13th century until 1895. From 1858 on it was the domain known as Wituland. Archeological evidence suggests Pate was a prominent location in local trade networks by the 10th century.

Pate Town is situated on the south-west coast of the island. According to the Pate Chronicle, the town of Pate was founded by refugees from Oman in the 8th century. It was re-founded in 1203 by members of the Nabhani family, also from Oman. The Pate Chronicle also claims that in the 14th century, Pate was so powerful that it had conquered most of the towns on the Swahili coast. However, recent archaeological findings (by Neville Chittick and later, Mark Horton) suggest that the references in the Chronicle to Pate's early history are wrong, and that the town is younger.

The 18th century was known as the "Golden Age of Pate", when the town was at its height of powers and also prospered in fine arts. Builders constructed some of the finest houses on the Swahili coast, with extensive elaborate plaster works. Goldsmiths made intricate jewellery, fine cloths (including silks) were made by Pate's weavers, and carpenters produced fine wooden furniture. The use and production of the musical instrument known as Siwa were most famous. Two examples of Siwas are held in the museum in Lamu.

Both men and women wrote poetry in the Kiamu dialect of Swahili. The Utendi wa Tambuka, one of the earliest known documents in Swahili, was written in the royal Yunga palace in Pate Town. The downfall of Pate town came as a consequence of continuous quarrelling/warring with its neighbours from the end of the 18th century.

In 1811, two British naval officers, Smee and Hardy, visited Pate, and witnessed the infighting.

In 1813, the famous "Battle of Shela" took place at Shela. This was an attempt by Pate, allied with the Mazrui clan from Mombasa/Oman, to subject Lamu. The attempt failed totally, and many were killed. Only a handful of people managed to return to Pate, and their losses were felt for years.

Thomas Boteler, who visited Pate in 1823, described seeing the remains of a Portuguese fort, but said that the place looked otherwise poor. The poet Mwana Kupona (died 1860) also lived at Pate Town. By 1892, the number of inhabitants had fallen to 300, down from 7,000. Today, the town has recovered some. Agriculture is the main economic activity.

== Siyu ==
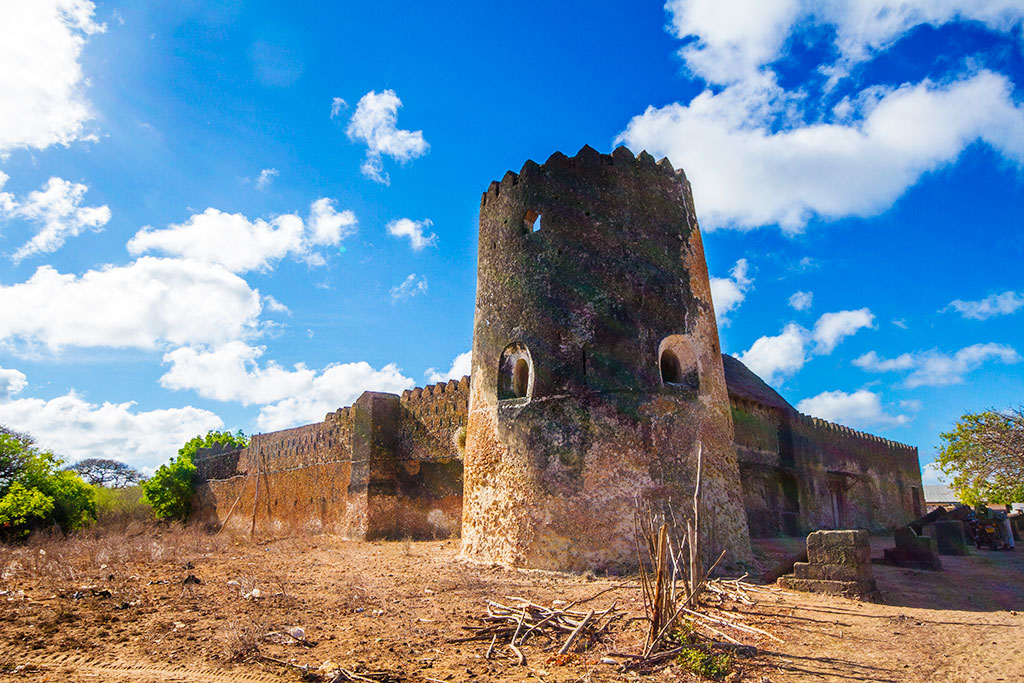
Siyu Fort on Pate island

Siyu town is situated on the North coast of Pate island. As no major excavations have been done in Siyu, its age is not known, but it might date from the 13th century. Gaspar de Santo Bernadino visited the town in 1606, and stated that it was the largest town on the island.

Siyu's main claim to historical fame is that it through several battles withstood the Sultans of Zanzibar. In 1843 the Sheikh of Siyu, Bwana Machaka wa Shee, and the new Sheikh of Pate, repudiated the sovereignty of Seyyid Said, Sultan of Oman and Zanzibar. In response, Seyyid Said assembled an army consisting of 2000 people from Muscat, Baluchistan and Lamu. Leading them was his cousin, General Seyyid Hemed bin Ahmed Al-Busaidy, known as "Amir Hemed". He had previously been Governor of Bandar Abbas (in 1824). He landed at Faza in early January 1844. On 6 January they moved towards Siyu, but were ambushed and forced back to Faza. After three weeks without a victory Amir Hemed sailed off.

In 1845 Siyu gave Seyyid Said one of his greatest military defeats, in this battle the famous Amir Hemed was killed and was buried in Rasini where his grave exists to date. Seyyid Said used to pay tribute to his grave at Rasini every year. It is believed Amir Hemed was very swift with his sword to the extent of stopping all arrows and spears shot at him in battlefield. The soldiers of Siu knew about this and during this battle two archers from the Siu army shot two arrows at him in one second targeting his armpit. When Amir Hemed swiftly lifted his sword to stop the first arrow the second shot his chest from the arm pit. It was a poisoned arrow and it killed him instantly. Seyyid Said planned a revenge to avenge the death of his cousin. After a while he cheated almost all the rulers, advisors and generals of Siu into a diplomatic mission with him in Zanzibar, but he turned this into a massacre mission for the rulers of Siu. They were advised by the sultan to leave behind all their weapons since it was a diplomatic one. Upon arrival in Zanzibar, Seyyid Said individually asked every individual in the Siu mission the whereabouts of Amir Hemed and everybody who answered that he is dead was killed instantly by the Sultan. Some of the diplomats who answered that Amir Hemed is still alive were spared but they were imprisoned for life at fort Jesus in Mombasa which was also under the Sultan then. After the Sultan of Zanzibar massacred almost all the rulers of Siu, he forcefully arrested the ones remained in Siu town and deported them to Mombasa for imprisonment at fort Jesus along with the others who survived the Zanzibar Massacre.

When Siyu finally succumbed to Zanzibar's dominance, under Sultan Majid in 1863, it was one of the last towns on the whole of the Swahili Coast to do so.

== Kizingitini ==
Kizingitini is situated on the North coast (east of Faza) and is the largest fishing port on the island. Lying slightly north of Rasini, the fishing port straddles 2° 4'11.90"S and 41° 8'29.92"E, and is the southern reach of the Kizingitini-Kiunga Spiny lobster fishery.

== Shanga ==
Shanga is an important archaeological site, situated on the South-East coast of the island. It was excavated during an eight-year period, starting in 1980. The earliest settlement was dated to the 8th century, and the conclusion drawn from archaeological evidence (locally minted coins, burials) indicate that a small number of local inhabitants were Muslim, probably from the late 8th century onwards, and at least from the early ninth. The excavations also revealed a major break in the development of Shanga in the mid or late 11th century, with the destruction and the rebuilding of the Friday Mosque Horton relates this to the writing of the historian João de Barros, about members of an Arab tribe, generally believed to be Qarmatians, who arrived at the Swahili coast. De Barros connects these new arrivals with a republican style of government.

Shanga was abandoned between 1400–1425; the event was recorded in both the History of Pate and in oral tradition. The Washanga ("the people of Shanga") consist of a clan who still live in the nearby Swahili town of Siyu. Rezende's description of Siyu in 1634 states that "the kingdom of Sio has no king but is ruled by governors"

== Evidence of Chinese exploration ==
In 1999, Nicholas Kristof of The New York Times reported a surprising encounter on the island of Pate. He found a village of stone huts. He talked to an elderly man living in the village who said that he was a descendant of Chinese explorers who were shipwrecked there centuries before. The Chinese had supposedly traded with the locals, and had even loaded giraffes onto their ship to take back to China. However, the Chinese ran aground on a nearby reef. Kristof found evidence that confirmed the man's story. Such evidence included the Asian features of the people in the village, plus Asian-looking porcelain artefacts.

National Geographic then published an article by Frank Viviano in July 2005. He had visited Pate island during the time he stayed on Lamu. Ceramic fragments had been found around Lamu, which the administrative officer of the local Swahili history museum claimed were of Chinese origin; specifically, from Zheng He's voyage to the Swahili Coast. The eyes of the Pate people resembled Chinese. Famao and Wei were some of the names among them which were speculated to be of Chinese origin. Their ancestors were said to be from indigenous women who intermarried with Chinese Ming sailors when they were shipwrecked. Two places on Pate were called "Old Shanga", and "New Shanga", which the Chinese sailors had named. A local guide who claimed descent from the Chinese showed Frank a graveyard made out of coral on the island, indicating that they were the graves of the Chinese sailors, which the author described as "virtually identical" to Chinese Ming dynasty tombs, complete with "half-moon domes" and "terraced entries".

== See also ==
- Scientific Adam
- Witu Sultanate

== Bibliography ==
- Boteler, Thomas (1835). Narrative of a Voyage of Discovery to Africa and Arabia: performed in His Majesty's ship Leven and Barracouta from 1821 to 1826. Vol. 1. R. Bentley.
- Burton, Richard Francis (1872). Zanzibar: city, island, and coast. Vol. 2. London: Tinsley brothers.
- Martin, Chryssee MacCasler Perry and Esmond Bradley Martin: Quest for the Past. An historical guide to the Lamu Archipelago. 1973.
- Mark Horton; with contributions by Helen W. Brown and Nina Mudida: Shanga: the archaeology of a Muslim trading community on the coast of East Africa. Memoirs of the British Institute in Eastern Africa; No. 14 London: British Institute in Eastern Africa, 1996. ISBN 1-872566-09-X

== See also ==
- Historic Swahili Settlements
- Swahili architecture
