= Mazrui =

The Mazrui or Mazar'i (Arabic: المزاريع) were an Omani Arab clan that reigned over some areas of East Africa, especially Kenya, from the 18th to the 20th century. In the 18th century they governed Mombasa and other coastal places and opposed the Omani Al Bu Sa'id Dynasty that ruled over Zanzibar. On at least one occasion, they attacked Stone Town allying with the Portuguese.

When the British East Africa Protectorate was established in the late 19th century, the Mazrui were one of the groups that most actively resisted the British rule, along with the Kikuyu and Kamba people.

== Notable people ==
- Ali Mazrui, academic and writer

== See also ==
- Mazari (Emirati tribe)
