= Juma =

Juma may refer to:

- Juma (name), including a list of people with the name
- Juma (actor) (born Jumas Omar, 1943–1989)
- Juma (jaguar), a jaguar that was featured then killed during the 2016 Summer Olympics in Brazil
- Juma, Mozambique, a village in Cabo Delgado Province
- Juma, Uzbekistan
- Juma people, indigenous to Brazil
- Juma language
- Juma River (Brazil), Amazonas State
- Juma River (China)

== See also ==
- Al-Jumua, the 62nd Sura of the Qur'an from which the names Juma and Jumaa mostly derive
- Jamia, the Arabic word for gathering
- Juma Masjid, meaning Congregational Mosque, several buildings
- Jumaa, a surname
- Jumar, a device used by mountaineers
- Jumu'ah the congregational Friday prayer of Islam
- Juma and the Magic Jinn, a children's picture book
