= Juma River =

Juma River may refer to:

- Juma River (Brazil), a river in the Amazonas state of Brazil
- Juma River (China), a river in northern China

== See also ==
- Juma (disambiguation)
