= Ali bin Alwi bin Thohir =

Indonesian Islamic scholar and politician (born 1967)

Drs. Kyai Hajji Habib Ali Alwi bin Thohir Al Husainy
- علي علوي بن طاهر الحسيني
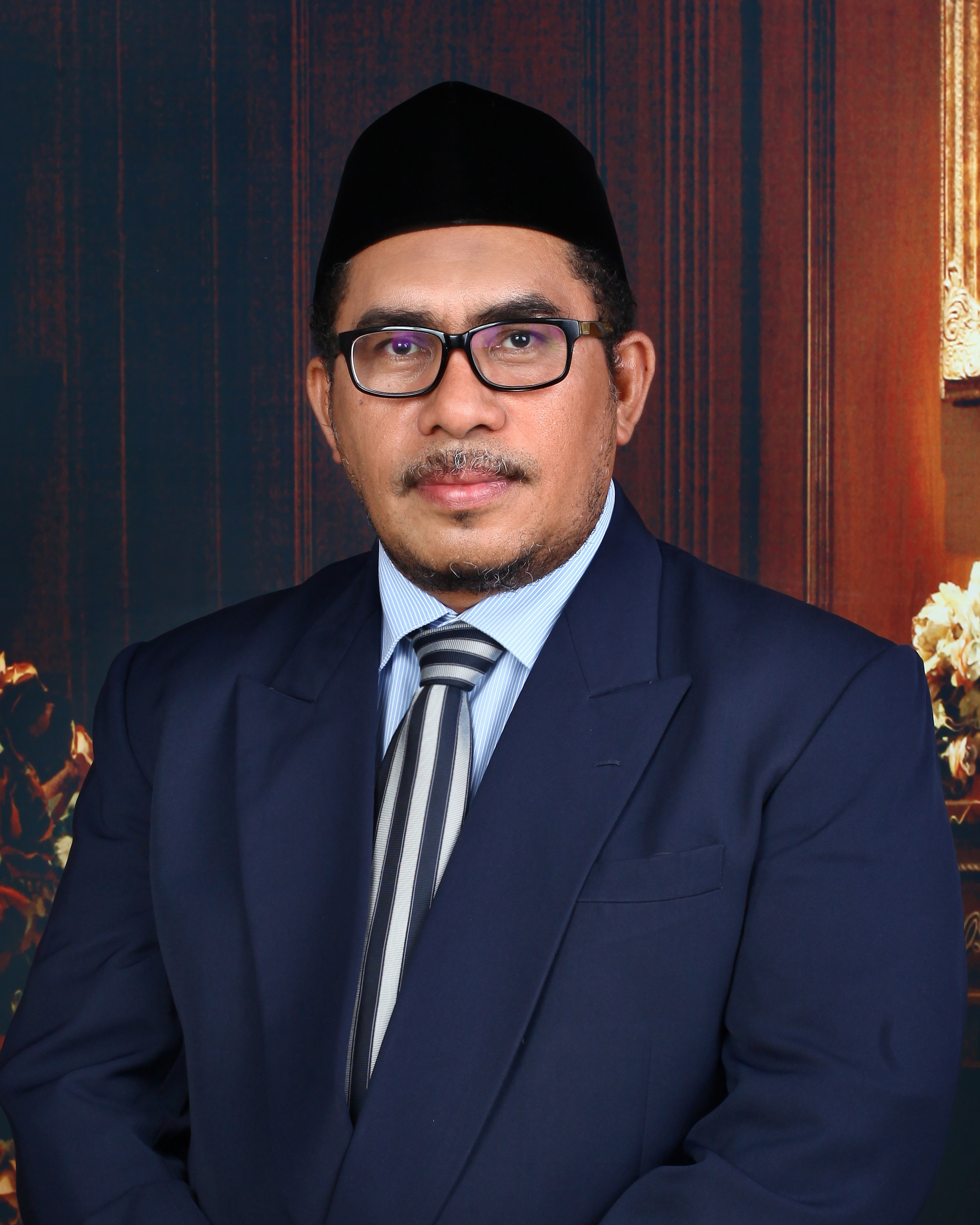
- Habib Ali Alwi as a member of the Regional Representative Council period 2014–2019
- Born: Ali; 2 September 1967 (age 58); Leihitu, Central Maluku Regency, Maluku
- Other name: Habib Ali Alwi
- Education: Pondok Pesantren Tebuireng; Syarif Hidayatullah State Islamic University Jakarta
- Occupations: Politician, da'i, islamic scholar
- Known for: Founder of the Pondok Pesantren Modern Al-Husainy
- Title: Habib
- Political party: National Awakening Party
- Website: Al-Husainy Community

Drs. Kyai Hajji Habib Ali Alwi bin Thohir Al Husainy (Arabic: علي علوي بن طاهر الحسيني, romanized: ‘Alī ʻAlwī bin Ṭāhir al-Ḥusayny, Arabic pronunciation: [ʕaliː ʕlwieː bin tˤ:hir al‿ħuˈsajniː]; born 2 September 1967) is an Indonesian politician, da'i, Islamic scholar and founder of the Pondok Pesantren Modern Al-Husainy, Serpong, South Tangerang, Banten. At the election of regional head and deputy regional head of Tangerang Regency in 2008, Alwi was nominated by the Democrat Party and the National Awakening Party as a candidate for vice regent along with Usamah Hisyam as a candidate for regent, but this pair was defeated by incumbent candidate Ismet Iskandar with Rano Karno as his deputy. Currently, Alwi serves as a senator representing the province of Banten in the Regional Representative Council.

== Biography ==
=== Early life ===
Habib Ali Alwi was born as the sixth of seven children in Hitulama village, Leihitu sub-district, Central Maluku Regency from Ba 'Alawi sada family surnamed Aal bin Thohir, his father was a private businessman named Sayyid Alwi bin Hussein bin Thohir, while his mother was Anawiyah bint Uthman. Alwi is the sixth descendant of Habib Abdullah bin Hussein bin Thohir (b. 1191 AH, d. 1272 AH), the cleric from Hadhramaut author of the kitab Sullam at-Taufīq, whose work was later expounding by Shaykh Muhammad Nawawi al-Bantani under the title Mirqāt Ṣu'ūd at-Taṣhdīq Fī Syarḥi Sullam at-Taufīq. From him was born the students who become great scholars, among them is Habib Ali bin Muhammad bin Husin al-Habsyi, author of treatise of Mawlid (Simthud Durar).

=== Education ===
Initial religious education obtained from his father, Habib Ali bin Husein bin Thohir. After four years old, he went to Jakarta and lived with his uncle Habib Yahya bin Husein bin Thohir in Angke, Tambora for one year, after which he moved to his sister's house in Kapuk, Cengkareng, West Jakarta. Alwi first went to school at Madrasah Al-Manshuriyah Jembatan Lima, Tambora, founded by Muhammad Mansur. After one year in Al-Manshuriyah, he then continued his studies at the Madrasah Ibtidaiyah Al-Ittihad which only lasted for 4 years due to acceleration classes.

After graduating from madrasah ibtidaiyah in 1980, he continued his education at madrasah tsanawiyah and madrasah aliyah Pondok Pesantren Tebu Ireng, Jombang until graduate in 1986. It was in Tebu Ireng that he started his organizational activities, such as become the head of OSIS, vice chairman of Indonesian Islamic Student Tebu Ireng, until become a campaigner of United Development Party in 1981.

After 6 years as a student at Tebu Ireng, he continued his studies at IAIN Syarif Hidayatullah (now Syarif Hidayatullah State Islamic University Jakarta) majoring in Comparative Religion, Ushuluddin faculty, while deepening some kitab kuning to Habib Muhsin Al Attas Petamburan and Kyai Hajji Muhammad Syafi'i Hadzami. He graduated at IAIN Syarif Hidayatullah Jakarta in 1991.

=== Personal life ===
In 1994, Alwi married Laila Nurlaila Bajri who was a friend of his sister. From his marriage to Laila, he was blessed with three children, Muhammad Husein bin Ali bin Thohir (b. 1995), Ali Zainal Abidin bin Ali bin Thohir (b. 1999), and Muhammad al-Baqir bin Ali bin Thohir.

== Political career ==
In the Post-Suharto era of 1998, starting from Abdurrahman Wahid's invitation to join the National Awakening Party (PKB) he founded, Alwi was later joined the party and was elected Chairman of the Executive Council of PKB Tangerang Regency. In 1999, he was elected to the People's Representative Council of Tangerang Regency from 1999 to 2004. Then in 2004, he was re-elected to the Provincial People's Representative Council of Banten period 2004–2008 from the Tangerang Regency electoral districts.

At the election of regional head and deputy regional head of Tangerang Regency in 2008, Alwi was nominated by the Democrat Party and the National Awakening Party as a candidate for vice regent along with Usamah Hisyam as a candidate for regent, Usamah and Alwi get the serial number 2, with serial number 1 was the pair Ismet Iskandar and Rano Karno, and serial number 3 was Jajuli Juwaeni and Airin Rachmi Diany. In the election of the head of this region, the pair of Usamah Hisyam and Alwi lost by incumbent candidate Ismet Iskandar together with Rano Karno as his deputy.

In 2009, Alwi was re-elected as a Member of the Regional Representative Council of Banten Province from the Tangerang City electoral district. Currently, Alwi serves as a senator representing the province of Banten in the seat of the Regional Representative Council of the Republic of Indonesia period 2014–2019 and has served as chairman of the Household Committee of DPD RI.

== Activity ==
=== Organization ===
Alwi has been active since he was educated at Madrasah Tsanawiyah Pondok Pesantren Tebu Ireng, Jombang. At that time, he was active as chairman of OSIS and vice chairman of Indonesian Islamic Student Tebu Ireng. In college, he was active as IAIN Syarif Hidayatullah Student Senate in 1988–1990 and Ciputat Islamic Students Association from 1986 to 1991. After graduating from college, he was active as Chairman of the Ulama Habaib Banten Forum and the Board of Multaqol Ulama Indonesia.

=== Founding a pesantren ===
On 9 September 1991, Alwi initiated the idea of establishing a pesantren on a 1 hectare waqf land from the H. Sano family in Pregi village, Lengkong Wetan, Serpong, South Tangerang. The pesantren was built in October 1991. In the beginning, the pesantren was named Pesantren Nur As-Sholihat under the name of the foundation founded by Syarifah Alawiyah bint Thohir (Alwi's sister) in Kota Bambu, Palmerah, West Jakarta. However, a few years later, the name of the pesantren was changed to Pondok Pesantren Modern Al-Husainy. At the beginning of the stand, in the pesantren also built kindergartens and madrasah diniyah. Then throughout the years 1993–1994, then founded boarding house, madrasah tsanawiyah, until madrasah aliyah.

On 7 March 1994, Alwi and his sister Syarifah Alawiyah bint Thohir went to a notary to formally record the establishment of the Pondok Pesantren Modern Al-Husainy under the auspices of the Nur As-Sholihat Foundation. At first the curriculum taught in pesantren only includes religious education, but over time there is the addition of general education to the curriculum of pesantren. Due to the expansion of residential land that occurred around the boarding school, now Pondok Pesantren Modern Al-Husainy is in the middle of the planned community of Bumi Serpong Damai, South Tangerang.

=== Da'wah ===
Alwi began actively doing tausiyah in several mosques when a student at Pondok Pesantren Tebu Ireng between 1982 and 1983. While studying in Jakarta, he actively counseling campus dakwah institutions at the University of Indonesia, National University, Borobudur University, government and private institutions, to attend various lecture competitions.

In 1989, Alwi won a national-level speech contest at the Ibn Sina da'wah institution, Jakarta, beating out other participants such as Muhammad Arifin Ilham who occupied the 2nd position. Alwi's da'wah soul has grown from a young age, so he is often invited to lecture in various places in Jakarta, even outside areas such as Cirebon, Tegal, Pekalongan, Banyuwangi, Banjarmasin, Aceh, Kutai, Batam, Padang, even to Merauke, Papua.

==== Method of da'wah ====
The method Alwi uses in preaching is with pay attention to rhetoric, dawah with pay attention to rhetoric is exposing a religious problem and then people feel involved with the problem being described. He argues, that the rhetoric in preaching is a language skill or art of speaking in the presence of others with a systematic and logical verbal to provide understanding and convince others. Rhetoric is also one of the science devices that support the process of implementation of da'wah, so that rhetoric and da'wah bil-lisan is inseparable.

As a professional da'i, Alwi has a perfect appearance of dress, morality, style of appearance, facial expression, voice muff, inspiration, until the words systematically with a firm and pleasant to hear. In connection with the professionalism of a da'i, he explained that professional da'i is a da'i who has knowledge and broad insight in the field of da'wah, and know the duty to function as a preacher.
