= Lamu =

Town in Lamu County, Kenya

- Town
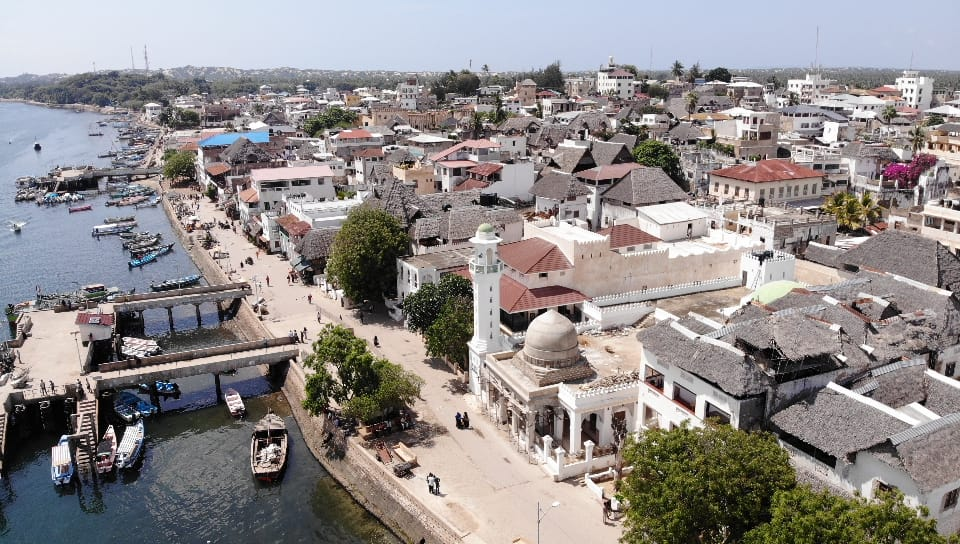
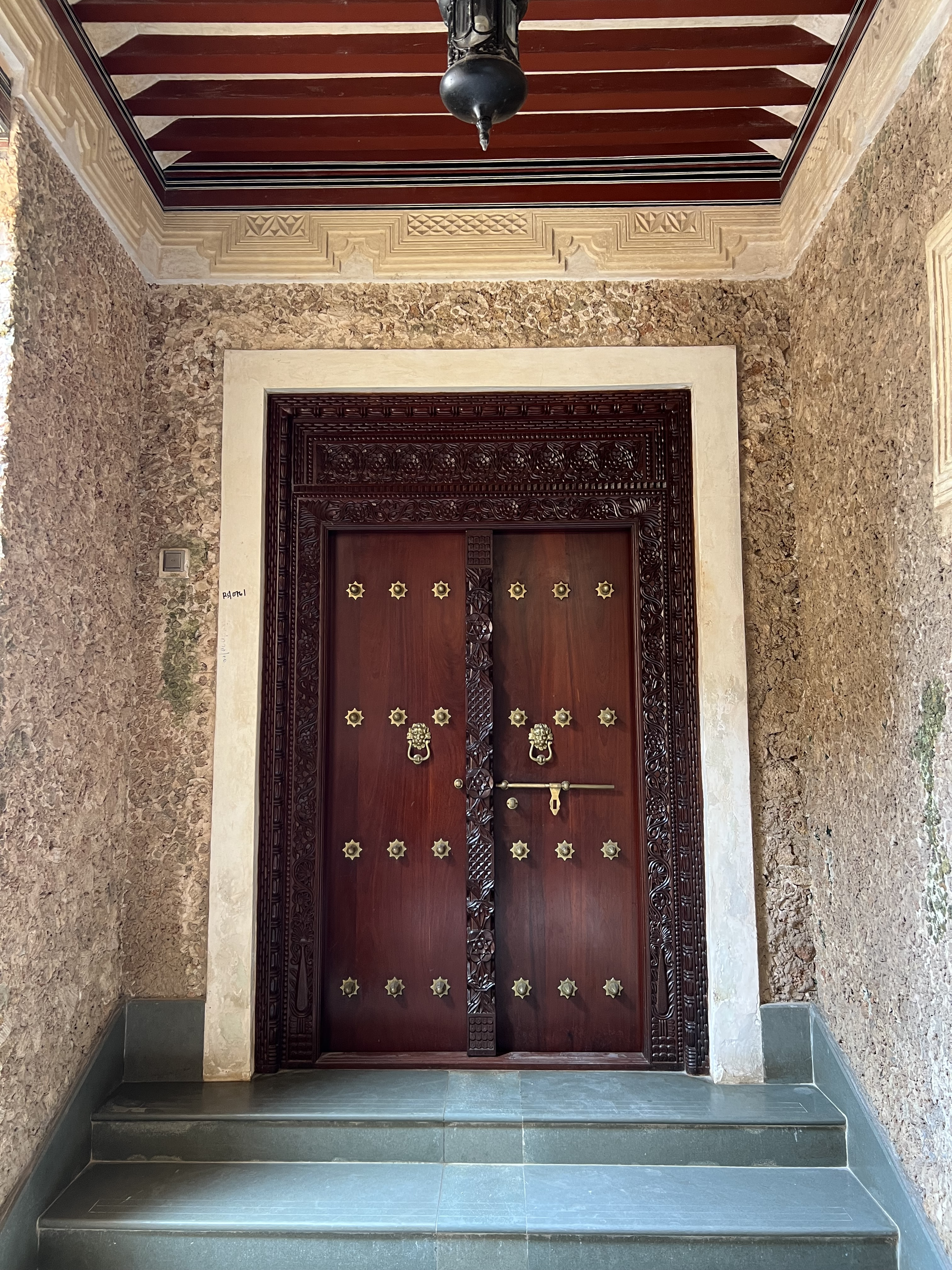
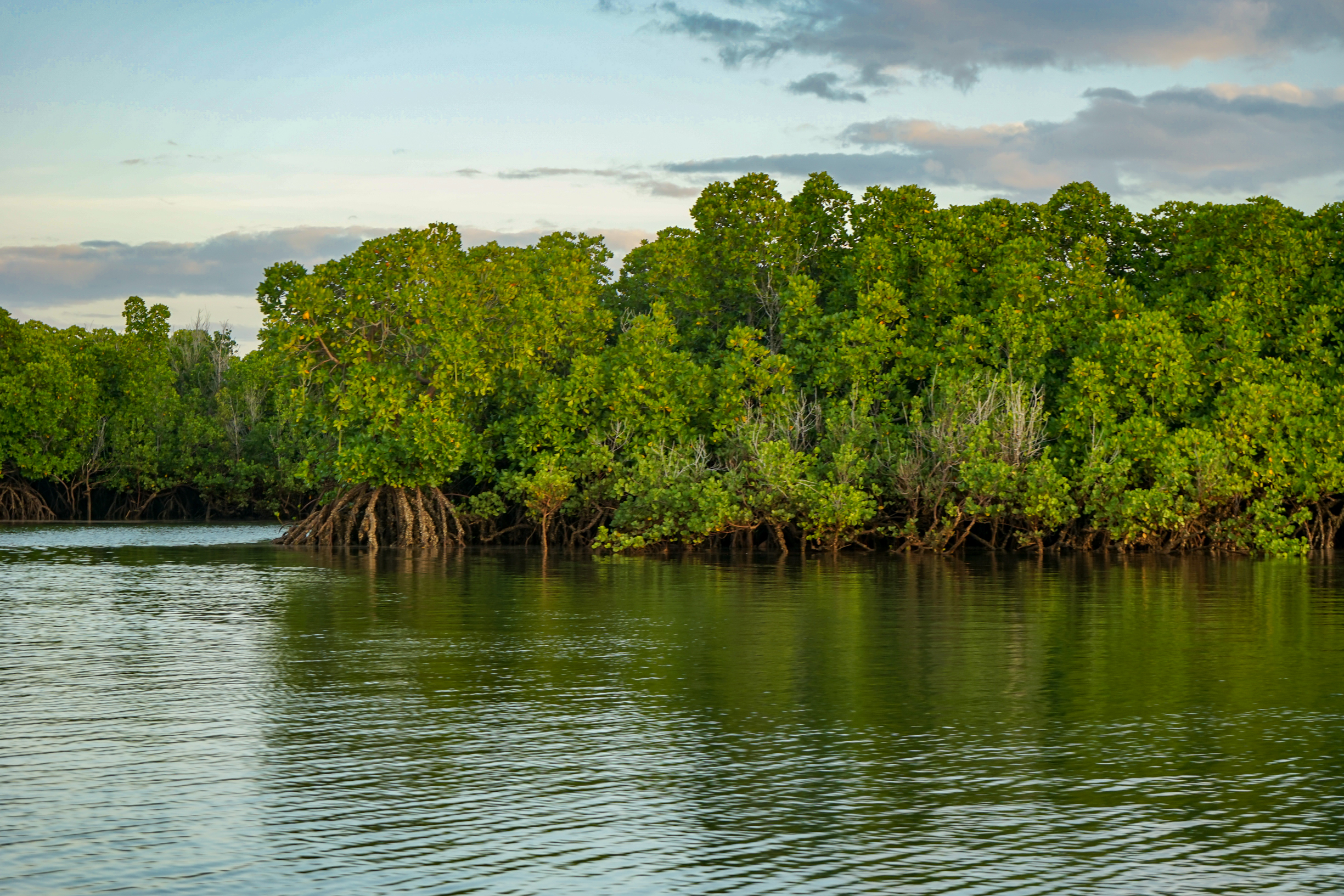
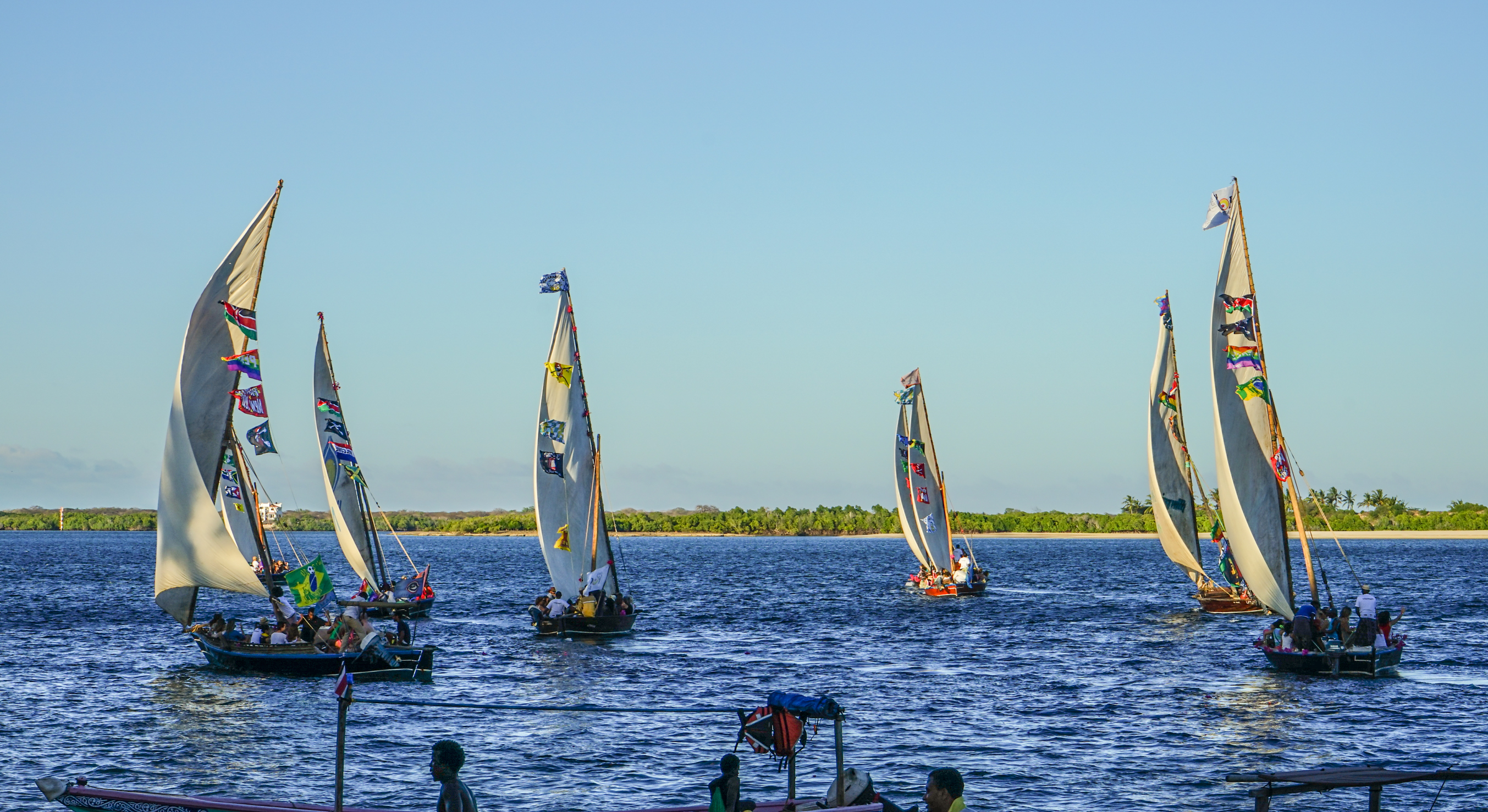

- Location within Kenya Location within the Horn of Africa Location within Africa
- Coordinates: 2°16′10″S 40°54′8″E
- Country: Kenya
- County: Lamu County
- Founded: 1370

Population (2019)
  - Total: 25,385
- Time zone: UTC+3 (EAT)

UNESCO World Heritage Site
- Official name: Lamu Old Town
- Criteria: Cultural: (ii), (iv), (vi)
- Reference: 1055
- Inscription: 2001 (25th Session)
- Area: 15.6 ha (39 acres)
- Buffer zone: 1,200 ha (3,000 acres)

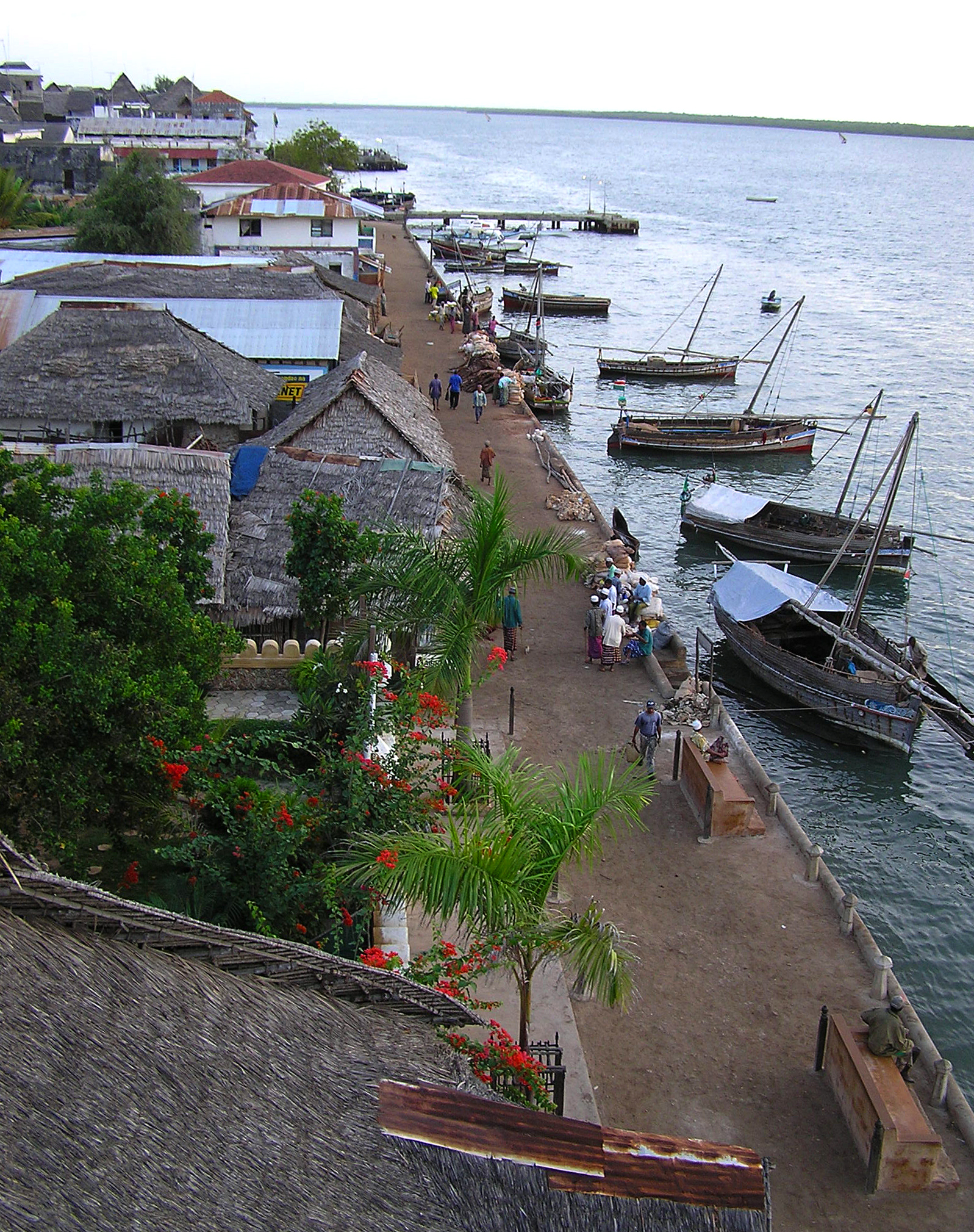
View of the seaside, Lamu Town

Lamu or Lamu Town is a small town on Lamu Island, which in turn is a part of the Lamu Archipelago in Kenya on the continent of Africa. Situated 341 kilometres (212 mi) by road northeast of Mombasa that ends at Mokowe Jetty, from where the sea channel has to be crossed to reach Lamu Island, it is the headquarter of Lamu County and a UNESCO World Heritage Site.

The town contains the Lamu Fort on the seafront, constructed under Fumo Madi ibn Abi Bakr, the Sultan of Pate, and completed after his death in the early 1820s. Lamu is also home to 23 mosques, including the Riyadha Mosque that was built in 1900 and a donkey sanctuary. Today, the majority of Lamu's population is Muslim.

== History ==
=== Early history ===
The original name of the town is Amu, which the Arabs termed Al-Amu (الآمو). The Portuguese termed it "Lamon" and applied the name to the entire island with Amu was the chief settlement.

Believed to have been established in 1370, Lamu Town on Lamu Island is Kenya's oldest continually inhabited town and it was one of the original Swahili settlements along coastal East Africa.

The town was first attested in writing by an Arab traveller Abu-al-Mahasini, who met a judge from Lamu visiting Mecca in 1441.

In 1506, the Portuguese fleet under Tristão da Cunha sent a ship to blockade Lamu. A few days later the rest of the fleet arrived, forcing the king of the town to quickly concede to pay an annual tribute to them and with 600 Meticals immediately. The Portuguese action was prompted by the nation's successful mission to control trade along the coast of the Indian Ocean. For a considerable time, Portugal had a monopoly on shipping along the East African coast and imposed export taxes on pre-existing local channels of commerce.

In the 1580s, prompted by Turkish raids, Lamu led a rebellion against the Portuguese. In 1652, Oman assisted Lamu to resist Portuguese control.

=== "Golden Age" ===
Lamu's years as an Omani protectorate during the period from the late seventeenth century to the early nineteenth century mark the town's golden age. Lamu was governed as a republic under a council of elders, known as the Yumbe, who ruled from a palace in the town. Little exists of the palace today other than a ruined plot of land. During this period, Lamu became a centre of poetry, politics, arts, crafts, and trade. Many of the buildings of the town were constructed during this period in a distinct classical style. Aside from its thriving arts and crafts trading, Lamu became a literary and scholastic centre. Women writers such as the poet Mwana Kupona – famed for her Advice on the Wifely Duty – had a higher status in Lamu than was the convention in Kenya at the time.

In 1812, a coalition Pate-Mazrui army invaded the archipelago during the Battle of Shela. They landed at Shela with the intention of capturing Lamu and completing the fort that was beginning to be constructed. However, they were violently suppressed by the locals in their boats on the beach as they tried to flee. In fear of future attacks, Lamu appealed to the Omanis for a Busaidi garrison to operate at the new fort and to help protect the area from Mazrui rebels along the Kenyan coast.

=== Colonial period ===
In the middle of the nineteenth century, Lamu came under the political influence of the sultan of Zanzibar. The Germans claimed Wituland in June 1885. The Germans considered Lamu to be of strategical importance and an ideal place for a base. From 22 November 1888 to 3 March 1891, there was a German post office in Lamu to facilitate communication within the German protectorate in the sultanate. It was the first post office to be established on the East African coast; today there is a museum in Lamu dedicated to it, the German Post Office Museum. In 1890, Lamu came under British colonial rule as stipulated in the terms of the Heligoland–Zanzibar Treaty.

Kenya gained political independence in 1963, although the influence of the Kenyan central government has remained low, and Lamu continues to enjoy some degree of local autonomy.

=== Modern Lamu ===
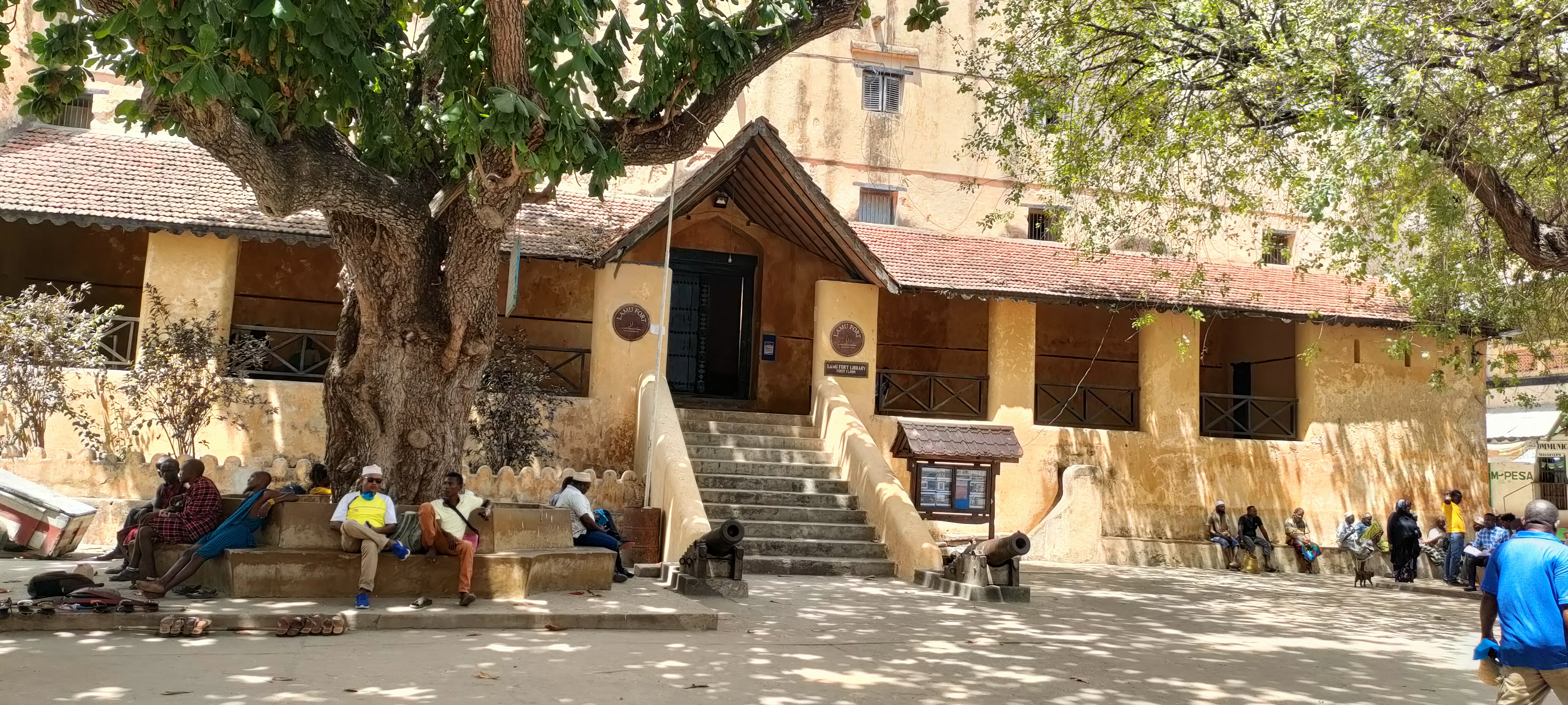
Lamu Fort Museum

In a 2010 report entitled Saving Our Vanishing Heritage, Global Heritage Fund identified Lamu as one of 12 worldwide sites most "On the Verge" of irreparable loss and damage, citing insufficient management and development pressure as primary causes.

Kidnappings by the terror group Al Shabaab placed Lamu off-limits in September 2011, but by early 2012 the island was considered safe. On 4 April 2012, the U.S. Department of State lifted its Lamu travel restriction. However, two attacks in the vicinity of Lamu in July 2014, for which Al Shabaab claimed responsibility, led to the deaths of 29 people.

On 17 March 2025, approximately ten Al Shabaab members with AK-47s entered the village and gathered all the Muslim residents of the village to preach about Islam. Then 100 more members of the group started incursions into the village, which caused Kenyan forces to launch an operation against them.

== Climate ==
Lamu has a tropical dry savanna climate (Köppen climate classification As).

Climate data for Lamu
Month	Jan	Feb	Mar	Apr	May	Jun	Jul	Aug	Sep	Oct	Nov	Dec	Year
Mean daily maximum °C (°F)	30.9 (87.6)	31.3 (88.3)	32.1 (89.8)	31.1 (88.0)	29.0 (84.2)	28.0 (82.4)	27.4 (81.3)	27.5 (81.5)	28.3 (82.9)	29.5 (85.1)	30.8 (87.4)	31.2 (88.2)	29.8 (85.6)
Mean daily minimum °C (°F)	24.5 (76.1)	24.7 (76.5)	25.5 (77.9)	25.6 (78.1)	24.5 (76.1)	23.7 (74.7)	23.2 (73.8)	23.1 (73.6)	23.5 (74.3)	24.3 (75.7)	24.6 (76.3)	24.6 (76.3)	24.3 (75.7)
Average rainfall mm (inches)	6 (0.2)	4 (0.2)	25 (1.0)	130 (5.1)	329 (13.0)	164 (6.5)	75 (3.0)	40 (1.6)	39 (1.5)	40 (1.6)	39 (1.5)	28 (1.1)	919 (36.3)
Average rainy days	1	1	3	10	15	15	11	8	7	5	6	3	85
Source: World Meteorological Organization

== Economy ==
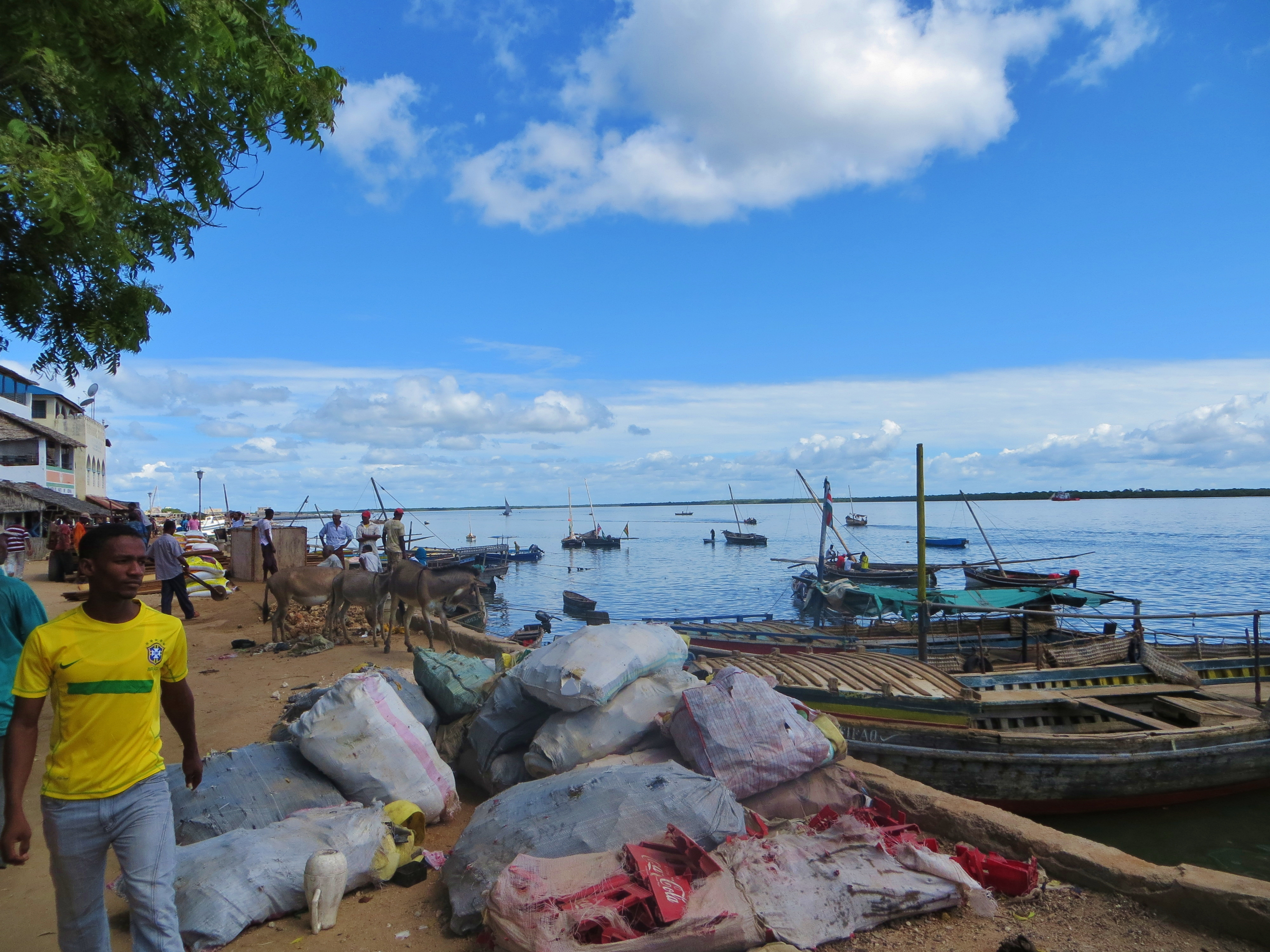
Activity on the waterfront

Lamu's economy was based on the slave trade until its abolition in the year 1907. Other traditional exports included ivory, mangrove, turtle shells, and rhinoceros horn, which were shipped via the Indian Ocean to the Middle East and India. In addition to the abolition of slavery, construction of the Uganda Railroad in 1901 (which started from the competing port of Mombasa) significantly hampered Lamu's economy.

Tourism has gradually benefited the local economy in early 2000s, Lamu is a popular destination for backpackers. Many of the locals are involved in providing trips on dhows to tourists. Harambee Avenue is noted for its cuisine and has a range of stores where coconut, mango, and grapefruit as well as seafood such as crab and lobster are common ingredients. The town contains a central market.

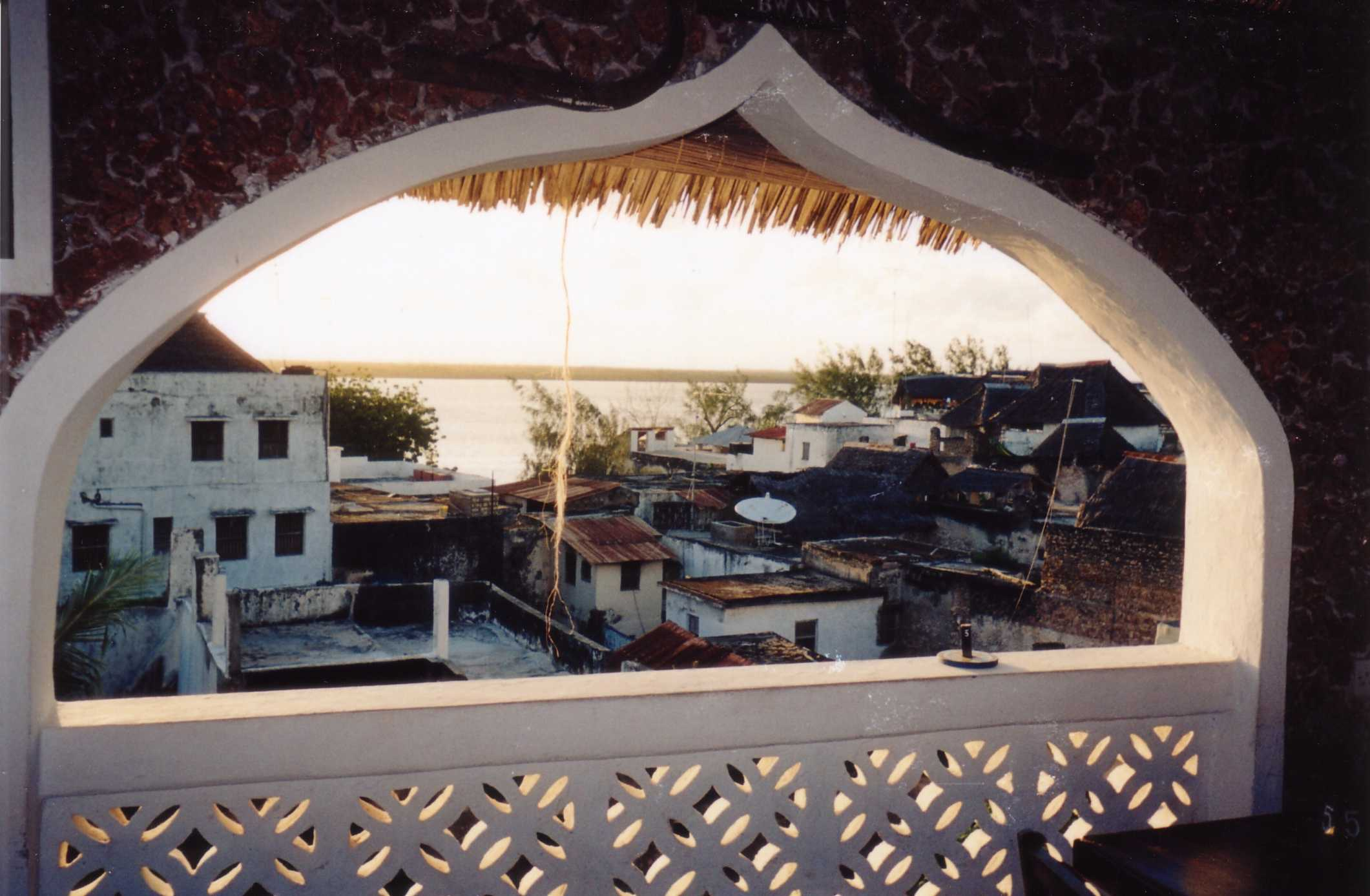
View from Stone House Hotel

The oldest hotel in the town, Petley's Inn, is situated on the waterfront. Other hotels include the recently renovated Amu House, the 20-room Bahari Hotel, the Doda Villas, the Swedish-owned Jannat House, the 3-storey 23-room Lamu Palace Hotel, the 13-room Stone House Hotel that was converted from an eighteenth-century house, and the 18-room Sunsail Hotel, a former trader's house on the waterfront with high ceilings.

Mangroves are harvested for building poles. Lamu has a sizeable artisan community, including boat building and making ornate doors and furniture.

The town is served by Lamu District Hospital to the south of the main centre, operated by the Ministry of Health. the hospital was established in the 1980s, and is one of the best-equipped hospitals on the Kenyan coast.

The Lamu Port at Manda Bay, the cornerstone of the LAPSSET project, was first proposed in 1975, but only initiated in 2009 under President Mwai Kibaki. When international funding for the project was sought, the Chinese government seized the opportunity to make LAPSSET part of their String of Pearls geopolitical strategy.

== Notable landmarks ==
The town was founded in the fourteenth century and it contains many fine examples of Swahili architecture. The old city is inscribed on the World Heritage List as "the oldest and best-preserved Swahili settlement in East Africa".

Once a centre for the slave trade, the population of Lamu is ethnically diverse. Lamu was on the main Arabian trading routes, and as a result, the population is largely Muslim. To respect the Muslim inhabitants, tourists in town are expected to wear more than shorts or bikinis.

There are several museums, including the Lamu Museum, home to the island's ceremonial horn (called siwa); other museums are dedicated to Swahili culture and to the local postal service. Notable buildings in Lamu town include:

=== Lamu Fort ===
Lamu Fort is a fort in the town. Fumo Madi ibn Abi Bakr, the sultan of Pate, started to build the fort on the seafront in order to protect members of his unpopular government. He died in 1809, before the first story of the fort was completed. The fort was completed by the early 1820s.

=== Riyadha Mosque ===
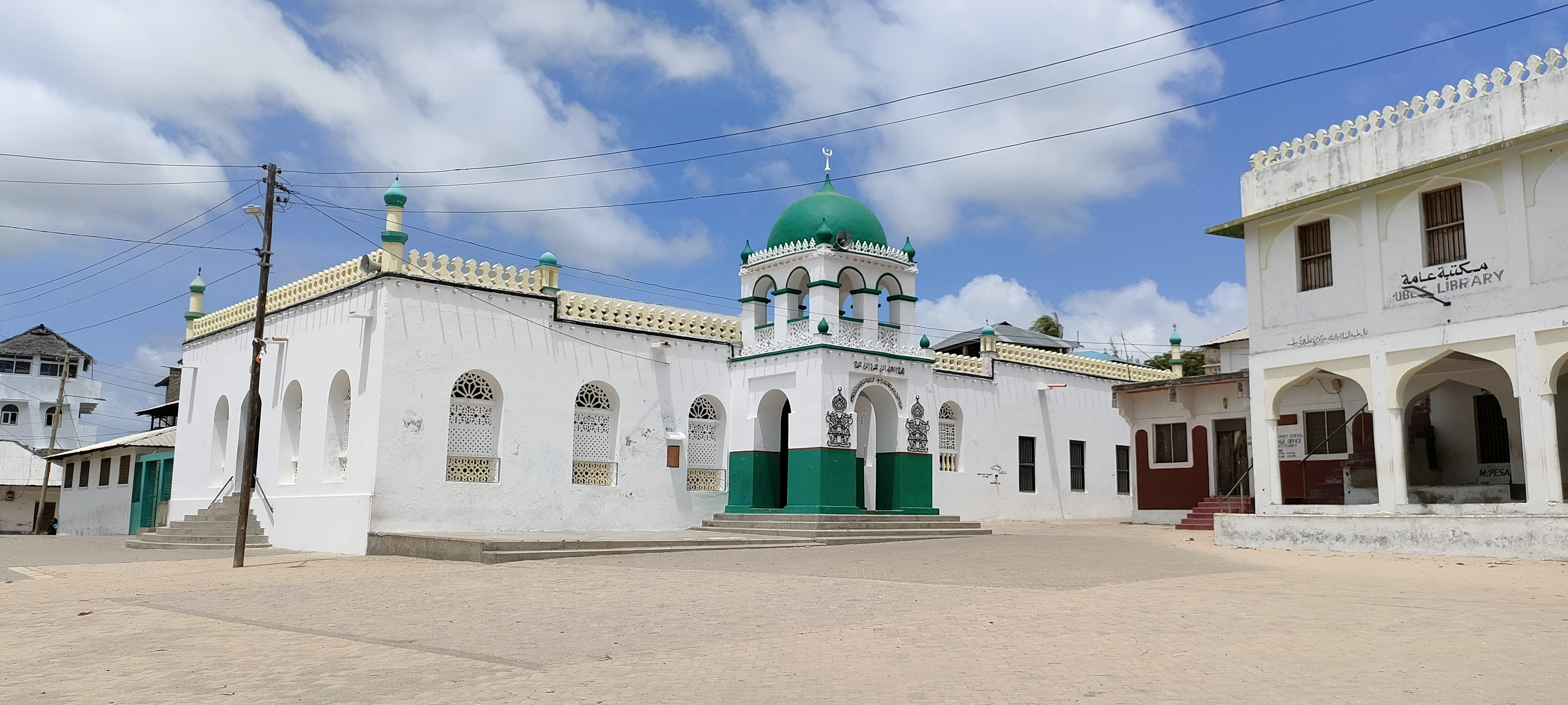
Riadha Mosque in Lamu

Habib Salih, a Sharif from Comoros Island with family connections to the Hadramaut, Yemen, settled on Lamu in the 1880s and became a highly respected religious teacher. Habib Salih had great success gathering students around him, and in 1892, the Riyadha Mosque was built. He opened up the doors of knowledge to everyone, introduced Habshi Maulidi, where his students sang verse passages accompanied by tambourines. After his death in 1935, his sons continued the madrassa thay became one of the most prestigious centres for Islamic studies in East Africa. The Mosque is the centre for Islamic Studies and the Maulidi Festival, which is held every year during the last week of the month of the Prophet Muhammad's birth. During this festival, pilgrims from Sudan, Congo, Uganda, Zanzibar, and Tanzania join the locals to sing the praise of Mohammad. Mnarani Mosque is also of note.

=== Donkey sanctuary ===
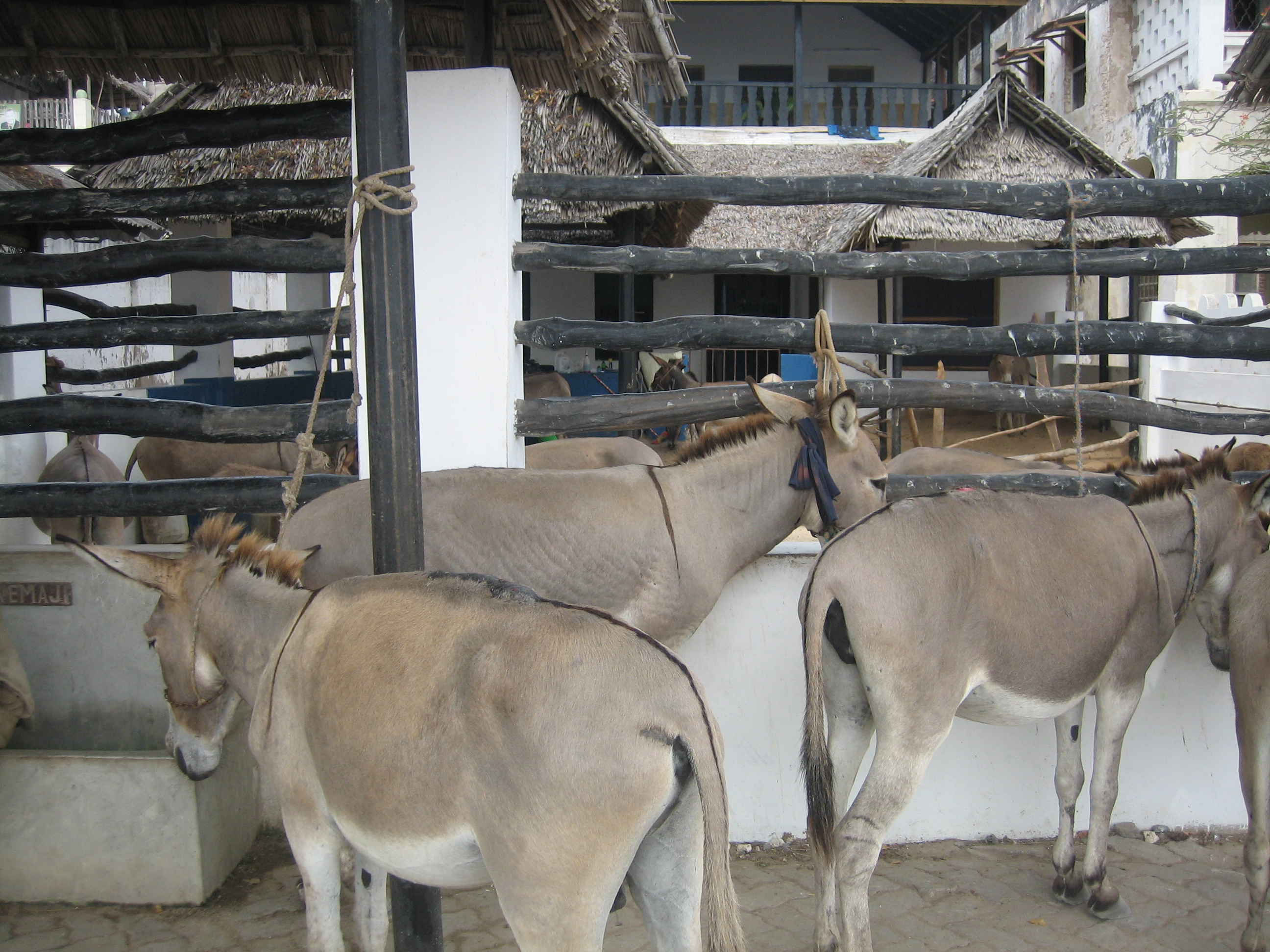
Lamu Donkey Sanctuary

Since the island has no motorised vehicles, transportation and other heavy work is done with the help of donkeys. There are approximately 3000 donkeys on the island. Dr. Elisabeth Svendsen of The Donkey Sanctuary in England first visited Lamu in 1985. Worried by the conditions for the donkeys, the Sanctuary was opened in 1987. The Sanctuary provides treatment to all donkeys free of charge.

== Culture ==
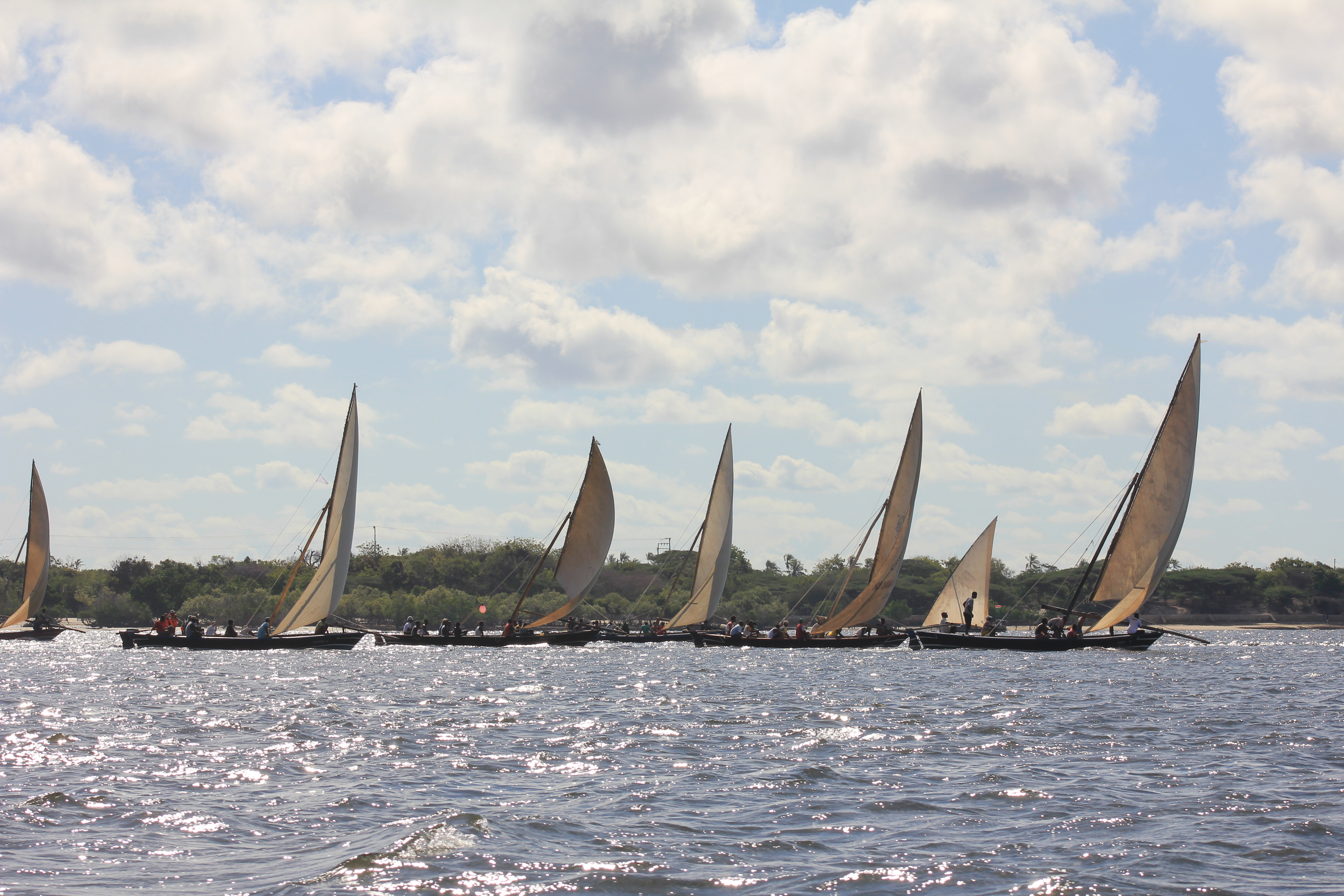
Dhows competition during the Lamu cultural festival 2012

Lamu is home to the Maulidi Festival, held in January or February, which celebrates Mohammed's birth. It features a range of activities from "donkey races to dhow-sailing events and swimming competitions". The Lamu Cultural Festival, a colourful carnival, is usually held in the last week of August, which since 2000 has featured traditional dancing, crafts including kofia embroidery, and dhow races. The Donkey Awards, with prizes given to the finest donkeys, are given in March/April. Women's music in the town is also of note and they perform the chakacha, a wedding dance. Men perform the hanzua (a sword dance) and wear kanzus..

The Swahili poet Mwana Kupona wrote her famous book-length poem Utendi Mwana Kupona in Lamu, in 1858. It is not only one of the most well-known works of early Swahili literature, but a seminal piece of nineteenth century East African cultural identity for women.

Lamu Old Town was designated as a UNESCO World Heritage site in 2001, based on three criteria:

- The architecture and urban structure of Lamu graphically demonstrate the cultural influences that have come together there over several hundred years from Europe, Arabia, and India, using traditional Swahili techniques to produce a distinct culture.
- The growth and decline of the seaports on the East African coast and interaction between the Bantu, Arabs, Persians, Indians, and Europeans represents a significant cultural and economic phase in the history of the region that finds its most outstanding expression in Lamu Old Town.
- Its paramount trading role and its attraction for scholars and teachers gave Lamu an important religious function in the region that it maintains to this day.

== Transport ==
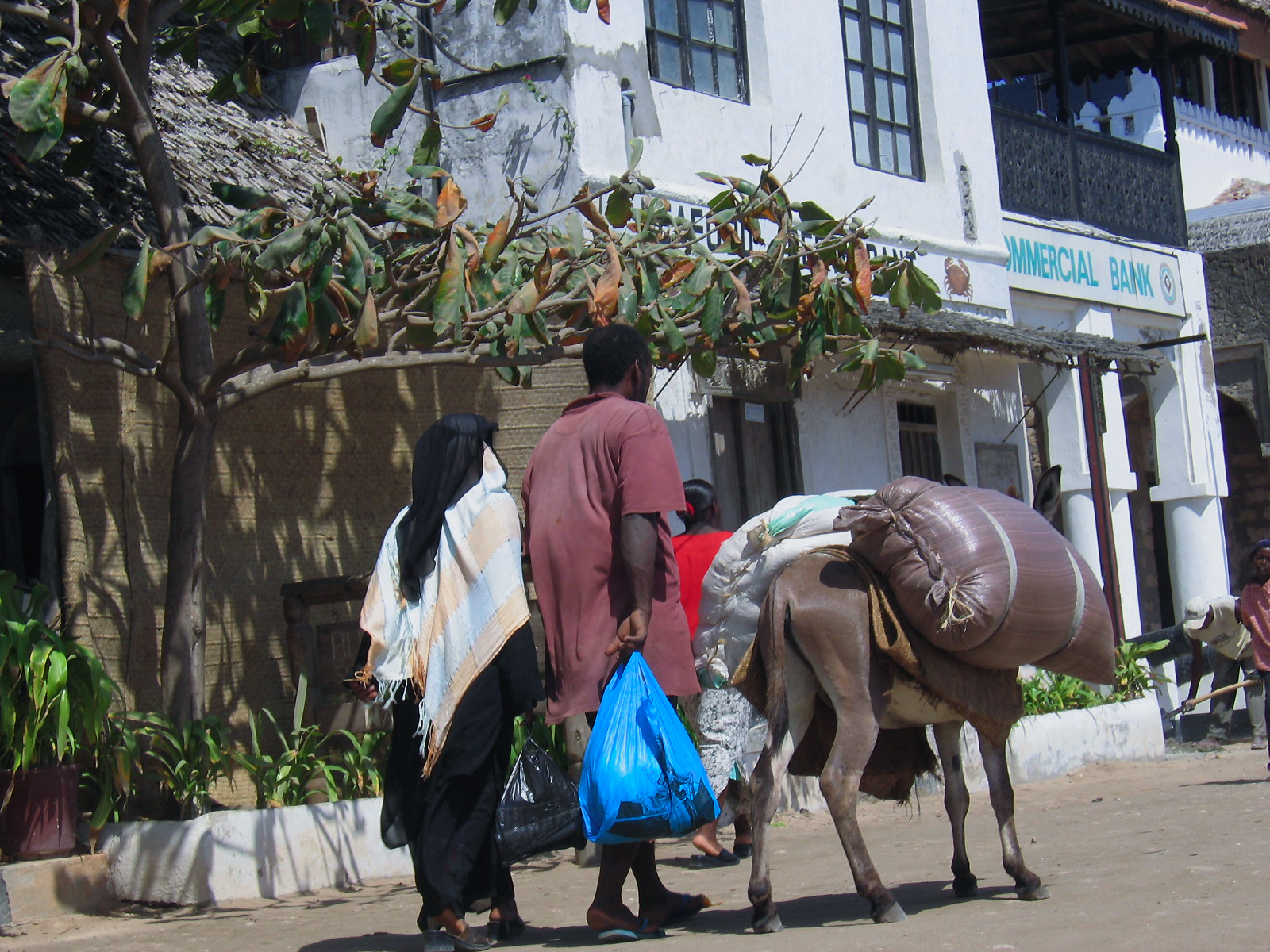
Locals using a donkey for transport

In 2011, proposals were being advanced to build a deep-water port that would have much greater capacity in terms of depth of water, number of berths, and ability for vessels to arrive and depart at the same time, than the country's main port at Mombasa.

Manda Airport is located on Manda Island in the Lamu Archipelago of Lamu County on the western shore of the Indian Ocean, on the Kenya coast and serves the Lamu and the county.

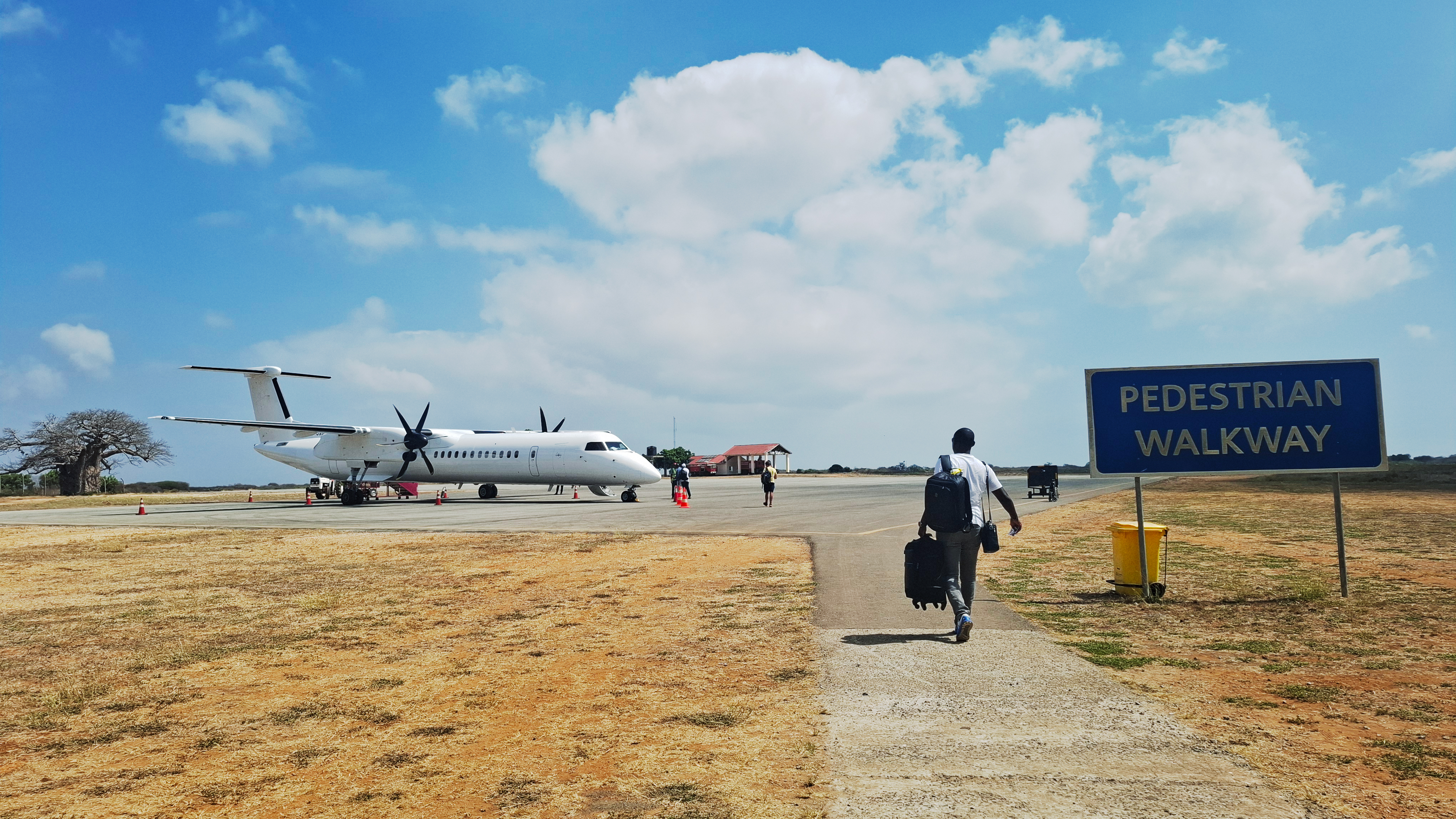
Manda airport Lamu airstrip - Kenya

Its location is approximately 450 kilometres (280 mi) by air, southeast of Nairobi International Airport, the country's largest civilian airport. Several airlines serves the area including, Air Kenya, Safari Link, and Fly 540 — there are daily flights to Malindi, Mombasa and Nairobi.

== Notable residents ==
- Ustadh Mau (born 1952), Muslim scholar, poet, and imam

== In popular culture ==
The song "Lamu" by Christian singer Michael W. Smith is inspired by the island. Written by Amy Grant, Smith, and Wayne Kirkpatrick, it refers to Lamu as "an island hideaway ...the place we soon will be a rebirth from life's demise ...where the world is still". Described as melodically memorable, the song is about the emptiness of escapism.

Lamu is the setting of Anthony Doerr's short story "The Shell Collector" from his collection of stories by the same name.

Part of the events in the novel Our Wild Sex in Malindi (Chapters 14 and 15) by Andrei Gusev takes place in Lamu and on the neighboring Manda Island.

Lamu is featured in Wilbur Smith's novel Monsoon.

Lamu is also the setting of the protagonist in three chapters of the novel Blue Yarn by Carrie Classon.

Lamu is the setting of the 1994 Edward D. Hoch short story Waiting for Mrs. Ryder.

== See also ==
- Juma and the Magic Jinn, a United States children's picture book set on Lamu Island
- Lamu Port and Lamu-Southern Sudan-Ethiopia Transport Corridor
- Historic Swahili Settlements
- Swahili architecture
