= Pasar Kliwon, Surakarta =

Pasar Kliwon
- District
- Location in Java
- Coordinates: 7.585810°S 110.828451°E
- Country: Indonesia
- Province: Central Java
- City: Surakarta

Area
  - Total: 4.82 km^{2} (1.86 sq mi)
- Elevation: 93 m (305 ft)

Population (2010)
  - Total: 74,145
  - Density: 15,400/km^{2} (39,800/sq mi)
- Time zone: WIB (UTC+07:00)
- Area code: 0271

Pasar Kliwon is a district (kecamatan) located in the southeastern city of Surakarta, Indonesia where Kraton Surakarta is located. It is also the concentrated clearly defined-living area of Arab Indonesians, where many of the occupants make a living from textile business. Pasar Klewer (Klewer Market), the biggest batik market in Indonesia, is located within the district, as is Kauman, known as Batik Tourism Village.

The following is the list of villages in Pasar Kliwon:

- Kampung Baru (postal code: 57111)
- Kauman (postal code: 57112)
- Kedong Lumbu (postal code: 57113)
- Baluwarti (postal code: 57114)
- Gajahan (postal code: 57115)
- Joyosuran (postal code: 57116)
- Semanggi (postal code: 57117)
- Pasar Kliwon (postal code: 57118)
- Sangkrah (postal code: 57119)

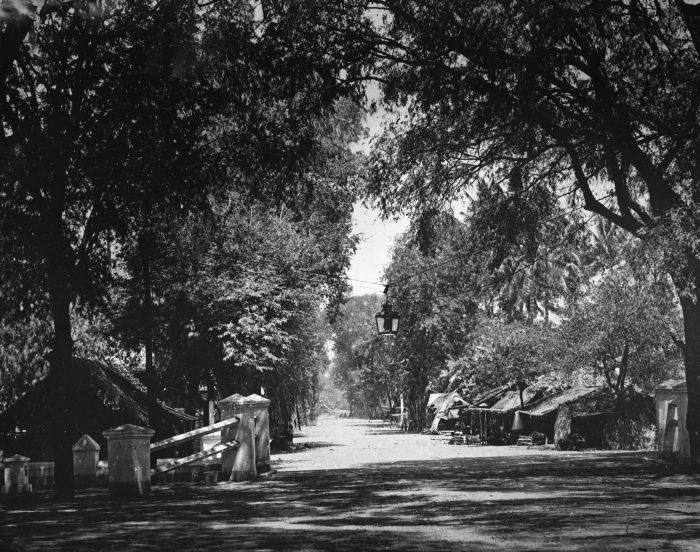
Pasar Kliwon Village, circa 1857 to 1874
