= Pasar Kliwon, Pasar Kliwon, Surakarta =

Pasar Kliwon
- Arab Village
- Location in Java
- Coordinates: 7.583358°S 110.831890°E
- Country: Indonesia
- Province: Central Java
- City: Surakarta
- District: Pasar Kliwon
- Elevation: 93 m (305 ft)

Population (2012)
  - Total: 5,404
- Statistics of Pasar Kliwon
- Time zone: WIB (UTC+07:00)
- Postal Code: 57118
- Area code: 0421

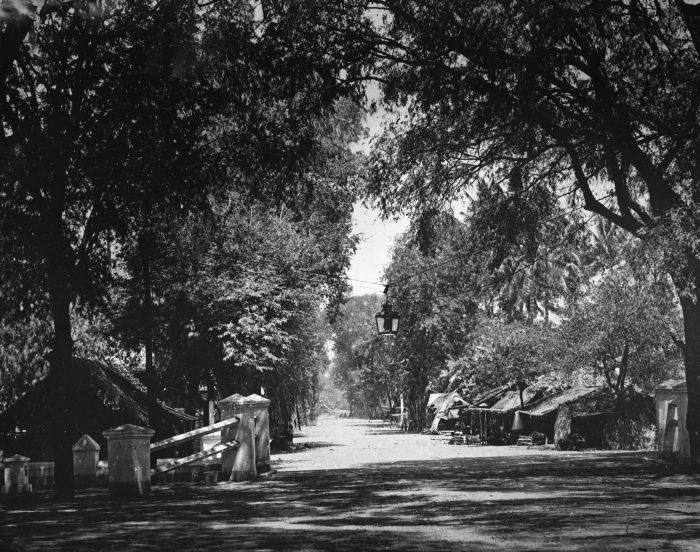
Pasar Kliwon Village, circa 1857 to 1874

Pasar Kliwon (Indonesian pronunciation: [ˌpasar ˈkliwɔn]) is a Arab village in the Pasar Kliwon in Surakarta, Central Java, Indonesia.

It is in the heart of Pasar Kliwon district and is known as the Arab quarter of Surakarta. Many of the mosques in this village have different architecture than those located elsewhere in Surakarta.

In earlier times, Pasar Kliwon was also the residence of clerks of Surakarta Sunanate. The clerks used a different style of Javanese script, called Pasar Kliwonan script.

== History ==
The word Kliwon is originated from the name of the fifth-day in 5-day calendar system in javanese tradition, while Pasar is originally from word Bazaar which means a market in Indonesian language.).

The market used to be crowded and busy every Kliwon day. According to one story, the market was initially known as the cattle market, especially for trading goats and sheep but transformed to a general market emphasizing in textile-related businesses.

During East Indies ruling in nineteenth century, Arab immigrants, mostly Hadhrami people were categorized as East Foreigners within the colonial social structure through Stelsel Wijken (Districts system) policy. The population was required to live in a special determined area and was led by a captain appointed by the government. The aim was to make them less harmful and easily supervised by the Dutch government that fear of Islam and Arab descents. The Dutch government decided to put the Arab immigrants in Pasar Kliwon area.

The economic foundation of these Hadhrami immigrants is formed by production and distribution of textile, mainly batik, sarong and kain tenun (woven fabrics). They also produce and sell prayer caps (songkok, taqiyah), tasbih, and other accessories for prayers. The population of Arab-Indonesians in Pasar Kliwon is 24.6% of total population in the village, which is the densest within the city of Surakarta. 95.8% of the residents are Muslims. Some of Javanese call these Arab-Indonesians Encik, which originally a greeting to young women in Malay language but means "Boss" according to the local terminology (because many of them are successful in business and being employers of the indigenous Javanese). The word later considered scornful by the Arab-Indonesians of Surakarta. Almost all are adherents to Shafi'i Madhab and many are of Ba'alawiya, except a handful minority who adhere to shiism, Salafism or Wahhabism. There is also a handful minority population of Indian and Pakistani descent in Pasar Kliwon, for example Abdullah Tufail, a Pakistani who founded Majelis Ta'lim Al-Qur'an (MTA) in 1972 in Pasar Kliwon.

Some of known figures grown up in the area, among others, are Haidar Bagir (businessman, scholar), his maternal uncle Abdillah Thoha (a politician and businessman; cofounder of National Mandate Party), and Anis bin Hadi (businessman). Many of the residents go to Diponegoro (formerly al-Rabithah) school, an offshoot of Jamiat Kheir school, sometime in their life. Pasar Kliwon is also known as the place where the commander of Cakrabirawa Lieutenant Colonel Untung Syamsuri grew up. Untung was one of the persons responsible in the 30 September Movement Coup d'etat. Untung's father, Abdullah, was a worker at Batik equipment store in Pasar Kliwon. He went to an elementary school in Ketelan in Banjarsari, another sub-district not too far from Pasar Kliwon. It is also the place where an Economic scholar, a Pluralist and an activist with the Liberal Islamic Network (Jaringan Islam Liberal, JIL) Dawam Raharjo grew up.

Gurawan Region in Pasar Kliwon always looks different every 20th of Rabi' al-thani of Islamic calendar, especially at al-Riyadh mosque, where thousands of visitors and guests from different regions across the country flock to the mosque to participate in the Khaul ceremony commemorating the great scholar Habib Ali bin Muhammad al-Habshi who died on 20th Rabi' al-Thani and is buried in Seiyun, Hadhramaut. Habib Ali is known for his Islamic preaching and also as the author of Simthud Durar, the Mawlid book of the praises and poetry tribute to Muhammad. The book containing the story of the birth, nature, morality, and the history of Muhammad is used across the country and recited during various Mawlid events.

The khaul is performed in Indonesia (Pasar Kliwon) because Habib Alwi bin Ali Al-Habshi which is Habib Ali's son, was the first to perform Mawlid of Habib Ali bin Muhammad al-Habshi in Surakarta. He was also the founder of the al-Riyadh Mosque in Pasar Kliwon, which he named it after the mosque in Seiyun built by his father.

During the mawlid, the book Simthud Durar is recited and after the Khaul ceremony has been performed, the organizer provides special Nasi Kebuli (a mixed variation of Nasi mandi food and Kabuli Palaw) banquet as tradition of Pasar Kliwon which is always awaited and sought after by visitors.

== Weather ==
Pasar Kliwon, as part of Surakarta, has a tropical rainforest climate. Throughout the year the humidity is about average annual precipitation of around 1362 mm. The average annual high temperature in Pasar Kliwon is around 82.67 °F (28.15 °C) and the annual low temperature is 71.0 °F (21.7 °C).

Climate data for Pasar Kliwon
Month	Jan	Feb	Mar	Apr	May	Jun	Jul	Aug	Sep	Oct	Nov	Dec	Year
Mean daily maximum °C (°F)	27 (81)	27 (81)	28 (82)	28 (83)	29 (85)	28 (83)	29 (84)	27 (81)	27 (81)	29 (85)	29 (84)	28 (82)	28.15 (82.67)
Mean daily minimum °C (°F)	22 (71)	22 (71)	22 (71)	21 (70)	22 (71)	22 (72)	22 (71)	21 (69)	21 (70)	22 (71)	23 (73)	22 (72)	22 (71)
Average precipitation mm (inches)	350 (13.8)	294 (11.6)	200 (7.9)	117 (4.6)	105 (4.1)	63 (2.5)	36 (1.4)	24 (0.9)	30 (1.2)	90 (3.5)	160 (6.3)	300 (11.8)	1,769 (69.6)
Source: http://www.worldweatheronline.com/Surakarta-weather-averages/Jawa-Tengah/ID.aspx
