= Jumaa =

Jumaa is a masculine given name and surname of Arabic origin. Notable people with the name include:

== Given name ==
- Jumaa Abdullah (born 1982), Emirati footballer
- Jumaa Aweso (born 1985), Tanzanian politician
- Jumaa Saeed (born 1992), Ivorian footballer

== Surname ==
- Abdulrahim Jumaa (born 1979), United Arab Emirates footballer
- Abdulsalaam Jumaa (born 1979), United Arab Emirati footballer
- Ali Thani Jumaa (born 1968), footballer from UAE who played as an offensive midfielder
- Badar Jumaa, (born 1981), Omani football goalkeeper

== See also ==
- Jumu'ah (alternative transliteration), the Muslim Friday prayer
