= Simthud Durar =

Poem praising Muhammad

Simtud Durar (Arabic: سمط الدّرر; Arabic pronunciation: [simðˤudduror]) also romanised as Simthud Durar or Simthud Duror is the book of poem praising Muhammad The Prophet of Islam written by Habib Ali bin Muhammad al-Habshi. The poem is usually recited during a Mawlid event. The poem is popular among Hadhrami descendants, especially of Sayyids in Hadhramaut, in the island of Java and in the towns of Lamu, Mambrui and Mombasa.

== The Author ==
Habib Ali bin Muhammad bin Husin al-Habshi was born on Friday November 17, 1843 CE (24 Shawwal 1259 AH) in Qasam, a town in Hadhramaut. He grew up under the care and supervision of both his father, Muhammad bin Husin bin Abdullah Al Habshi and mother, Syarifah Alawiyyah bint Al-Hussain bin Ahmad Al-Hadi Al-Jufri, who at the time was known as a piety woman.

At a very young age, Ali had studied and finished reciting al-Quran and successfully mastered the outward and inward knowledge before reaching the age that is usually required for that. Since then, he was consented to by the teachers and instructors to give lectures and studies in public, and in short time he became the center of attention and admiration and a place of honor in the hearts of every person in his town. He was handed the responsibility to teach at educational institutions and at large meetings.

Furthermore, he also collected, directed and educated his students to acquire knowledge, as well as to inspire them in the pursuit of high ideals and noble. To accommodate them, he built a mosque called "al-Riyadh" in Seiyun, as well as boarding schools which were equipped with various facilities to meet their needs, so that they can study in peace and quiet, free from all disturbing thoughts, especially those concerned with the needs of everyday life.

Ali died in Seiyun, on Sunday March 7, 1915 CE (20 Rabi al-Akhir 1333 AH) and survived by sons who have obtained the best education of his own, who continued his ideals in preaching and disseminating Islam. Among his sons, his youngest son Habib Alwi bin Ali Al-Habshi was well known in Indonesia as he founded "al-Riyadh" mosque for his father namesake in Pasar Kliwon, Surakarta as well as to hold the Simtud Durar mawlid for the first time in the country.

== The Poem ==
The book Simtud-Durar (literally means A Necklace of Pearls) is written by al-Habib ‘Ali bin Muhammad al-Habshi when he was at the age of 68 years. He started to write the poem on March 19, 1909 CE (26 Safar 1327 AH). Habib 'Ali dictated the initial paragraph of the Simtud Durar by saying basmalah.

In the beginning of Rabi 'al-Awwal 1327 AH (around April 1909 CE), he ordered his students to read the poem. He opened it with great Fatiha. Then on Wednesday night, 9 Rabi al Awwal, he began reading the masterpiece at his home after it was perfected. He said, "The poem is very touching, after having just finished".

The poem is similar to Qasida, but mostly in the form of two-column stanza. It consists of 15 chapters which contain the history in poetic prose and praises of the Prophet. In chapter one it starts with Salawat poem.

The poem is recited during a Mawlid or other similar events. Usually the recitation is started by one person and after finishing one chapter the book is passed along to another person next to him to continue reciting it. Sometimes people recite it while sway to and from as if in spiritual ecstasy. It is also common during recitation of certain chapters the chanting accompanied with Rebana, especially when reciting chapter eight. The congregation raises during Mahallu al-Qiyaam (Qiyaam literally means standing in Arabic) when the eighth chapter is chanted.
