= Juma River (Brazil) =

River in Brazil

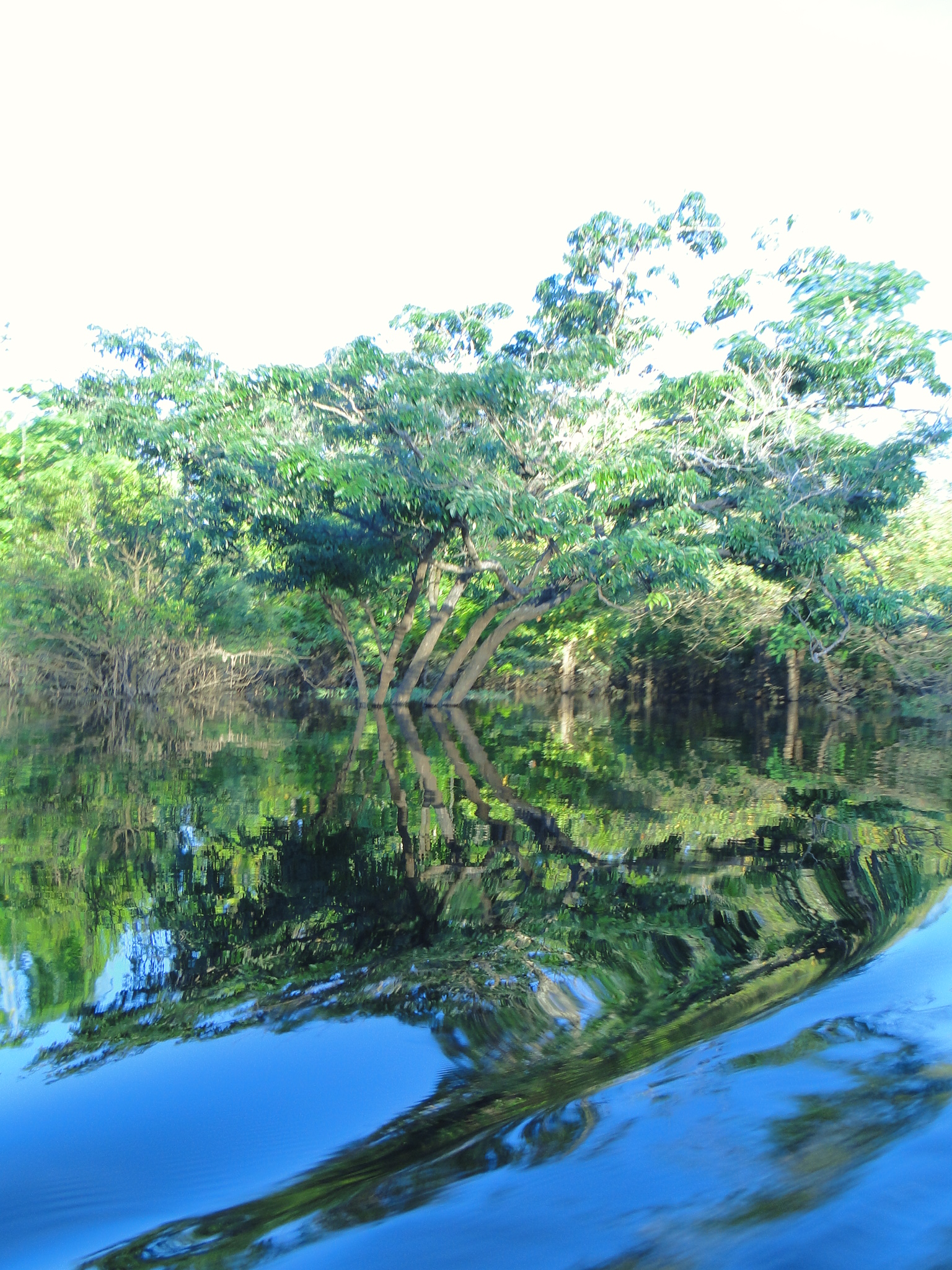

Location
- Country: Brazil

Physical characteristics
- Source
  - location: Amazonas state
- Mouth
  - location: Aripuanã River
  - coordinates: 6°0′S 60°11′W

Juma River is a tributary of the Aripuanã River in Amazonas state in north-western Brazil.

== See also ==
- List of rivers of Amazonas
