= Juma and the Magic Jinn =

1986 picture book by Joy Anderson

- Front cover illustration
- Author: Joy Anderson
- Illustrator: Charles Mikolaycak
- Cover artist: Charles Mikolaycak
- Genre: Children's book
- Publisher: Lothrop, Lee & Shepard
- Publication date: 1986
- Publication place: United States
- Media type: Print (hardback)
- Pages: 32 pp
- ISBN: 0688054439
- Dewey Decimal: [E] 19
- LC Class: PZ7.A538 Ju 1986

Juma and the Magic Jinn is a children's picture book written by Joy Anderson and illustrated by Charles Mikolaycak. First published in 1986 by Lothrop, Lee and Shepard Books, this folktale with an African setting tells the story of a fictional, daydreaming boy named Juma who is living on the real Lamu Island just off the East coast of Kenya. Desiring to be someplace where he won't have to study or behave, Juma seeks the help of a magical jinn (in English, a genie), a decision which leads Juma on misadventures. In the same year the book was published, Juma and the Magic Jinn won a 1986 Golden Kite Award for Mikolaycak's illustrations. These illustrations additionally played a role in Mikolaycak receiving the 1987 Kerland Award "in recognition of singular attainments in the creation of children's literature."

== Background ==
Juma and the Magic Jinn is an African folklore inspired children's book written Joy Anderson and illustrated by Charles Mikolaycak (26 January 1937 – 23 June 1993). The book illustrations use double-page spreads to capture a sequential picture style containing an attention to details, colours, and African setting patterns. Targeted for children ages 6–9, the folktale takes place on Lamu, a real island just off the East coast of Kenya that was established as early as the fourteenth century by Arab traders and is populated with Muslims. It was Anderson's visit to the island that inspired the University of Central Florida adjunct professor to write about a present-day boy who had a fairy-tale adventure.

== Plot ==
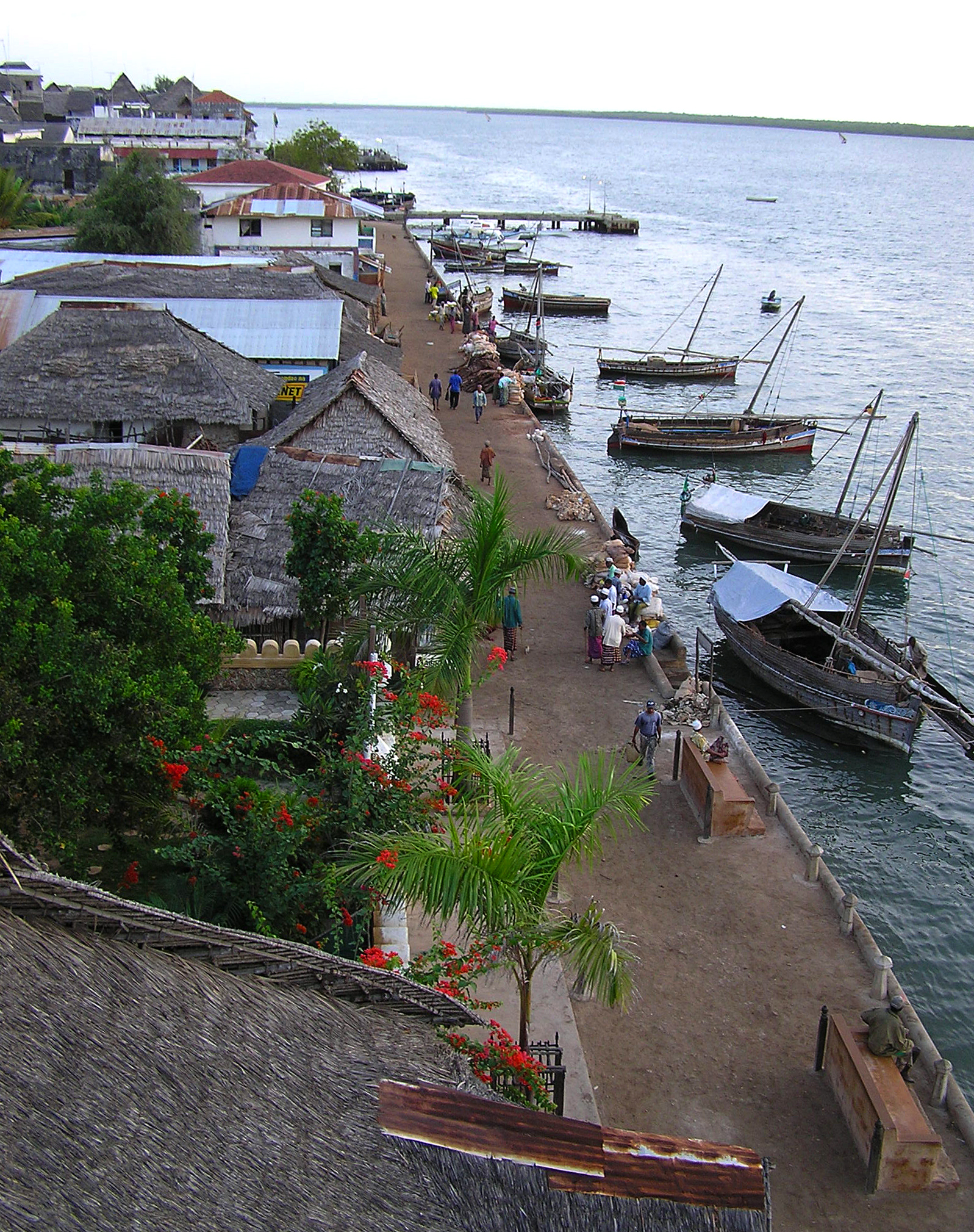
View of the seaside on Lamu Island

On the seafaring Lamu Island, families traditionally keep a jinn jar at home. The jinn jar is a container that holds a supernatural being in Islam and Arabian mythology called a jinn (in English, a genie). The jinn jar is kept sealed because the owners do not know if their magic jinn is good or evil, which makes people of Lamu Island generally afraid of the jinns.

The story opens with a young student named Juma daydreaming in a school instead of doing his mathematics. Since the young Juma concentrates more on his own directions of thought rather than the lessons being taught, the teacher sends Juma home. On the way home, he comes across his mother buying fish at the shore. His mother admonishes his daydreaming in school and suggests that Juma may be better off working with his father to cut mangrove poles. She instruction Juma to go home, but instructs Juma to not touch the jinn jar.

At home, Juma disobeys his mother's prior instructions and removes the cork sealing the jinn jar and calls the jinn. Juma is sceptical about his efforts and does not believe in magic. However, the magic jinn appears, in this instance as a "young woman with black and smiling catlike eyes," whose dark hair is tied with amber beads. The jinn offers to grant Juma wishes. Desiring to be some place where he won't have to study or behave, Juma formulates his wishes to overcome his need for schooling, particularly math and writing ("sums and script"). The magic jinn grants some of Juma's wishes and is sent away from his home on what turns out to be misadventures. Eventually, Juma is able to get home again but arrives with new appreciation of his home and family and realisation that learning can be exciting and fun.

== Reaction ==
Juma and the Magic Jinn was published in 1986. In that same year, Juma and the Magic Jinn was awarded Honor Book in the picture book illustration category of Golden Kite Award. In February 1987, the dark, rich color illustrations in the African folklore book were singled out as strong and handsome elements that emphasise the mystery of the tale. These and other illustrations lead to Mikolaycak receiving the 1987 Kerland Award "in recognition of singular attainments in the creation of children's literature." From 12 September 1993 to 1 May 1994, the McKissick Museum at the University of South Carolina exhibited Juma and the Magic Jinn.
