= Chole Island =

Island of the Mafia Archipelago in Pwani Region, Tanzania

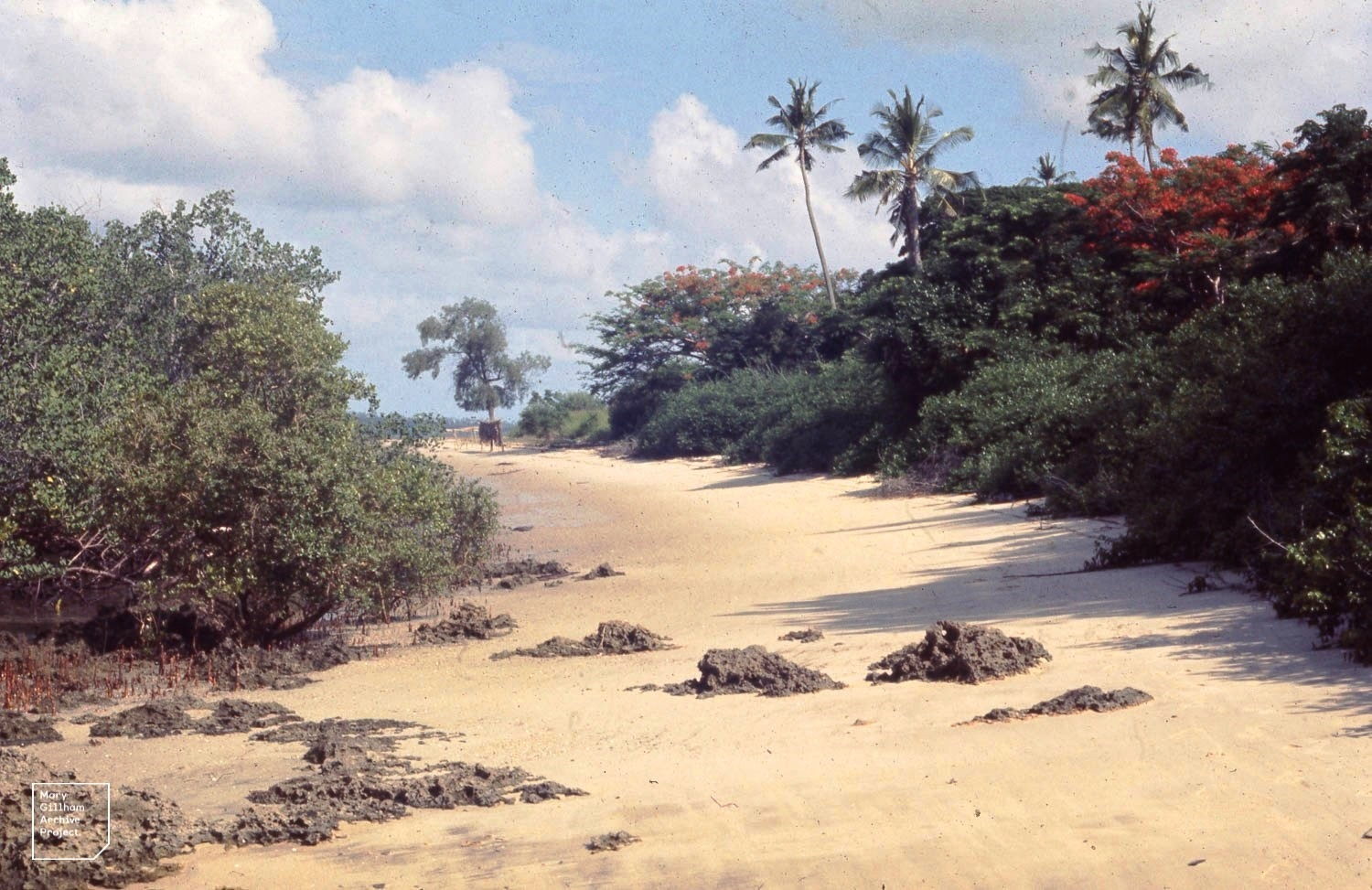
- Chole Island

- Location on the Mafia Archipelago

Geography
- Location: Sea of Zanj
- Coordinates: 7°58′17″S 39°45′39″E
- Archipelago: The Mafia Archipelago
- Area: 2.26 km^{2} (0.87 sq mi)
- Length: 1.8 km (1.12 mi)
- Width: 0.9 km (0.56 mi)

Administration
- Tanzania
- Region: Pwani Region
- District: Mafia District
- Ward: Jibondo

Demographics
- Languages: Swahili
- Ethnic groups: Matumbi, Ndengereko & Rufiji

Chole Island or Chole Mjini Island (Kisiwa cha Chole Mjini, in Swahili) is an island of the Mafia Archipelago located in Jibondo ward of Mafia District in southern Pwani Region of Tanzania. A fossil coral reef that was uncovered at the conclusion of the last ice age, around 12,000 years ago, served as the foundation for the 2.26 km2 island of Chole. It has been a part of the Mafia Island Marine Park for a very long time.

== History ==
In the Mafia archipelago in the Rufiji River delta, the island of Chole's first settlers were the Bantu people from the Matumbi, Ndengereko and Rufiji communities. The Mnyange mosque may have served as a secure place of prayer for the Shirazi sailors who sailed along the Swahili coast and were based in the islands south of Mafia and Kilwa. The Chole Island Ruins are one of the few remnants of the Medieval Swahili settlement on Chole Island. After the Shirazi settlement of Kua on adjoining Juani Island fell to the Sakalava and was destroyed, the survivors established Chole Mjini under the protection of the Omani Arabs of Zanzibar, who traded from the island circa 1820.

Following a switch in colonial powers, the Germans claimed Chole in 1890 and continued to expand the small island's administration centre with banks, courts, schools, and jails in their distinctive design. The island is covered in the remains of more than 36 of these buildings. Despite their occupation, Germans bought freedom for many enslaved by enforcing their release. They started the process of transferring the government to Kilindoni on Mafia Island, where the District headquarters is now, in order to intercept commerce ships as well.

== Demographics ==
As the Arab ensalvers relocated to reside on their fields on mainland Mafia to defend their coconut plantations from other immigrants and freed slaves, the population of the island, which had been around 8,000, started to decline. The British continued to move more of the district offices to Kilindoni and torn down the buildings on Chole to recycle building materials when the Germans lost the Mafia to them during World War One. By the 1960s, only three families with 11 children remained on Chole after the commercial community had moved on.

With Julius Nyerere's villagisation strategy of the late 1960s, some villages were designated as hubs for growth a decade after the country gained independence from the British, allowing people to move there. Chole Island was chosen, and Internal immigration once more started. as of 2022, Chole now has 350 dwellings and a population of roughly 1,500 people as a result of ongoing family migration.

== Economy ==
The Chole population relies on fishing, farming, and a bustling boatyard for their livelihood. Since the Mafia Island Marine Park was established in 1996, harmful fishing and coral harvesting have been restricted. In order to increase their income, women began producing seaweed, and many young people with only a minimal education and rudimentary English have found employment in the expanding tourism industry. It is an active museum on Chole Island. Chole has the appearance of a rich botanical paradise thanks to the silt that has been trapped throughout time in the coral cracks, compost, and planting from earlier civilizations. A stroll through Chole village reveals the traces of vegetation and structures from numerous historical eras that are constantly being resorted.
