= Niororo Island =

Protected island and marine reserve in Pwani Region of Tanzania

- Location on the Mafia Archipelago

Geography
- Location: Sea of Zanj
- Coordinates: 7°37′09″S 39°40′57″E
- Archipelago: The Mafia Archipelago
- Length: 0.8 km (0.5 mi)
- Width: 0.5 km (0.31 mi)

Administration
- Tanzania
- Region: Pwani Region
- District: Mafia District
- Ward: Kirongwe

Demographics
- Languages: Swahili
- Ethnic groups: Matumbi, Ndengereko & Rufiji

Niororo Island or spelled in some maps as Nyororo Island (Kisiwa cha Niororo, in Swahili) is an island of the Mafia Archipelago located in Kirongwe ward of Mafia District in southern Pwani Region of Tanzania. The island has a small islet to the south east. The Island is located north of Shungumbili Island and is bordered to the north is Mafia Island. To the south is Juani Island and to the east is the sea of Zanj. Many locations, particularly off Miewi island, were used for the majority of the sport fishing industry in the islands. However, Tutia Reef was regarded to be the best fishing location.
