= Bwejuu Island =

Island of the Mafia Archipelago in Pwani Region, Tanzania

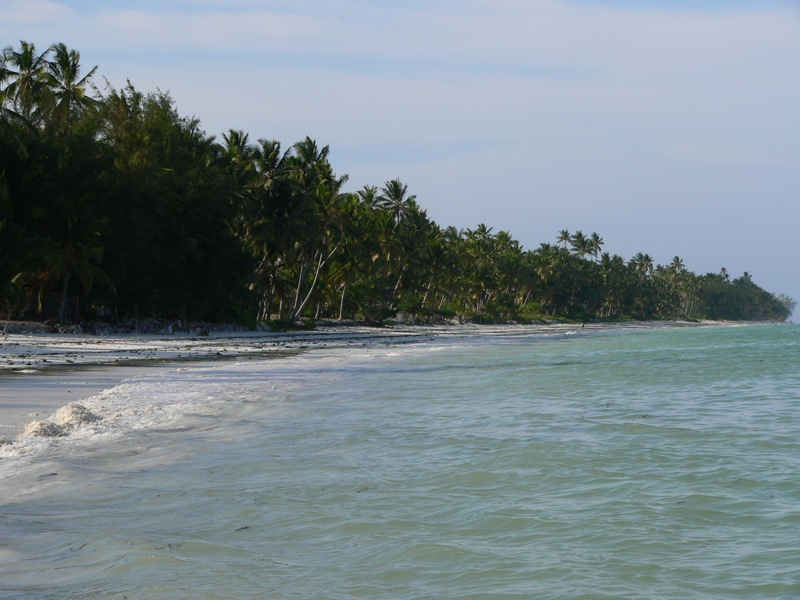
- Bwejuu Island

- Location on the Mafia Archipelago

Geography
- Location: Sea of Zanj
- Coordinates: 7°56′40″S 39°31′9″E
- Archipelago: The Mafia Archipelago
- Length: 3.3 km (2.05 mi)
- Width: 0.3 km (0.19 mi)

Administration
- Tanzania
- Region: Pwani Region
- District: Mafia District
- Ward: Kilindoni

Demographics
- Languages: Swahili
- Ethnic groups: Matumbi, Ndengereko & Rufiji

Bwejuu Island (Kisiwa cha Bwejuu, in Swahili) is an island of the Mafia Archipelago located in Kilindoni ward of Mafia District in southern Pwani Region of Tanzania. After Jibondo Island, which is to its east, the island is the fourth largest in the archipelago. Mafia Island is to the east, and the Mafia Channel is to the west and south of the island.

The island is part of the Mafia Island Marine Park. A green sea turtle that had nested and been tagged in the Comoros in 2001 was willingly released by a gillnet fisherman on Bwejuu Island in August 2002. This was the first turtle that had been seized on Mafia Archipelago that had been released voluntarily.

== Geography ==
Bwejuu Island is one of the eight islands that make up the Mafia archipelago. It is situated 15 km offshore to the east of the Rufiji Delta on Tanzania's central coast. The Mafia (Main) Island's closest point to the coast of the mainland is Bwejuu Island, one of the six inhabited islands in the archipelago, which is located around 5 km off its western shore.The island is a sandbank on a vast coral reef, with pristine sandy soil that is productively infertile and only supports coconut trees. It is less than 200 m north–south and around 3 km east–west, but maps from the 1820s imply that it was once larger. The Bwejuu island is moveable due to the south-east wind's consistent action. One rocky islet, known locally as Kijiwe Nyara Kubwa (at the western end of the island) and Kijiwe Nyara Ndogo (at the eastern end), is located on the southern side of each of the island's ends (east and west).

The search for freshwater has been unsuccessful despite numerous attempts to drill deep wells. Salinity-producing well water typically evaporates during the height of dry seasons. Fresh water is derived from two sources; the first is rainfall that is gathered by a designed catchment tank and is utilised sparingly and saved for the dry seasons. Second, fresh water was transported to the island by boats from the Rufiji Delta or Kilindoni and sold as a business venture.

Bwejuu Island is mostly accessible by straight boats from Kilindoni, which dock on either the north or south side depending on the direction of the monsoon wind. The former is used during the north-east monsoon (Kaskazi), which blows between November and March, while the latter is used during the south-east monsoon (Kusi in Swahili), which blows from April to August. The Island is easily accessible at high tide when boats may reach up to the shore because to the vast nature of the basal coral reef.

== History ==
Some academics believe that Bwejuu Island served as the first crossing point for Bantu settlers from the mainland into the Mafia archipelago because of its location halfway between the mainland coast and that group of islands. The historic crossing of the Mafia Channel was recreated by archaeologists Chami and Msemwa using inexpensive boats. Over 900 people are thought to currently reside on Bwejuu Island. They primarily rely on fishing and coconuts, however they also keep domestic animals including chickens, goats, and sheep. The majority of the locals travel across the channel to the Rufiji delta to farm, and some have families there.

Archaeological survey and excavation of 2019 on the island's southeast turned up beads and ceramics from the 16th to 18th centuries CE, confirming Chami's earlier discoveries. A considerable amount of pottery from transoceanic trade operations, some of which have been documented from other parts of the Mafia archipelago, was discovered during an underwater survey on the south and south-east of the island. Thermoluminescence dating was performed on three samples, and the results showed that two dates ranged from the first century BCE to the seventh century CE, with one sample producing a date between those periods. On this day in antiquity, civilizations from the Red Sea, the Mediterranean Sea, and the northern Indian Ocean engaged in trade with Azania in East Africa.

The findings of this 2019 study imply that Bwejuu Island was populated far earlier than previously believed during its ancient history. The imported pottery discovered in the submerged area and dated to the first century BC–first century AD indicates a transoceanic colony, maybe providing hints about the long-lost ancient city of Rhapta. Thermoluminescence dates indicate a continuous occupation of the Island from the ancient times until the 17th century AD, despite the lack of sherds traceable to Swahili tradition in the gathered assemblage. The evidence of the Island's settlements throughout those times consists of potsherds identified as belonging to post-Swahili and nearly modern traditions.
