= Miewi Island =

Island of the Mafia Archipelago in Pwani Region, Tanzania

- Location on the Mafia Archipelago

Geography
- Location: Sea of Zanj
- Coordinates: 7°56′13″S 39°48′51″E
- Archipelago: The Mafia Archipelago
- Length: 1.9 km (1.18 mi)
- Width: 0.6 km (0.37 mi)

Administration
- Tanzania
- Region: Pwani Region
- District: Mafia District
- Ward: Baleni

Demographics
- Languages: Swahili
- Ethnic groups: Matumbi, Ndengereko & Rufiji

Miewi Island (Kisiwa cha Miewi, in Swahili) is an island of the Mafia Archipelago located in Baleni ward of Mafia District in southern Pwani Region of Tanzania. The island has a small islet to the south east. The Island is located at the mouth of Chole Bay and is bordered to the north is Mafia Island. To the south is Juani Island and to the east is the sea of Zanj. Many locations, particularly off Miewi island, were used for the majority of the sport fishing industry in the islands. However, Tutia reef was regarded to be the best fishing location.
