= Barakuni Island =

Protected island and marine reserve in Pwani Region of Tanzania

- Location on the Mafia Archipelago

Geography
- Location: Sea of Zanj
- Coordinates: 7°43′26″S 39°45′01″E
- Archipelago: The Mafia Archipelago
- Length: 0.3 km (0.19 mi)
- Width: 0.2 km (0.12 mi)

Administration
- Tanzania
- Region: Pwani Region
- District: Mafia District
- Ward: Kirongwe

Demographics
- Languages: Swahili
- Ethnic groups: Matumbi, Ndengereko & Rufiji

Barakuni Island or in some maps as Mbarakuni Island (Kisiwa cha Barakuni, in Swahili) is a protected island of the Mafia Archipelago located in Kirongwe ward of Mafia District in southern Pwani Region of Tanzania. The island is not part of the Mafia Island Marine Park.
