= Mafia District =

District of Pwani Region, Tanzania

Mafia District Wilaya ya Mafia (Swahili)
- District of Pwani
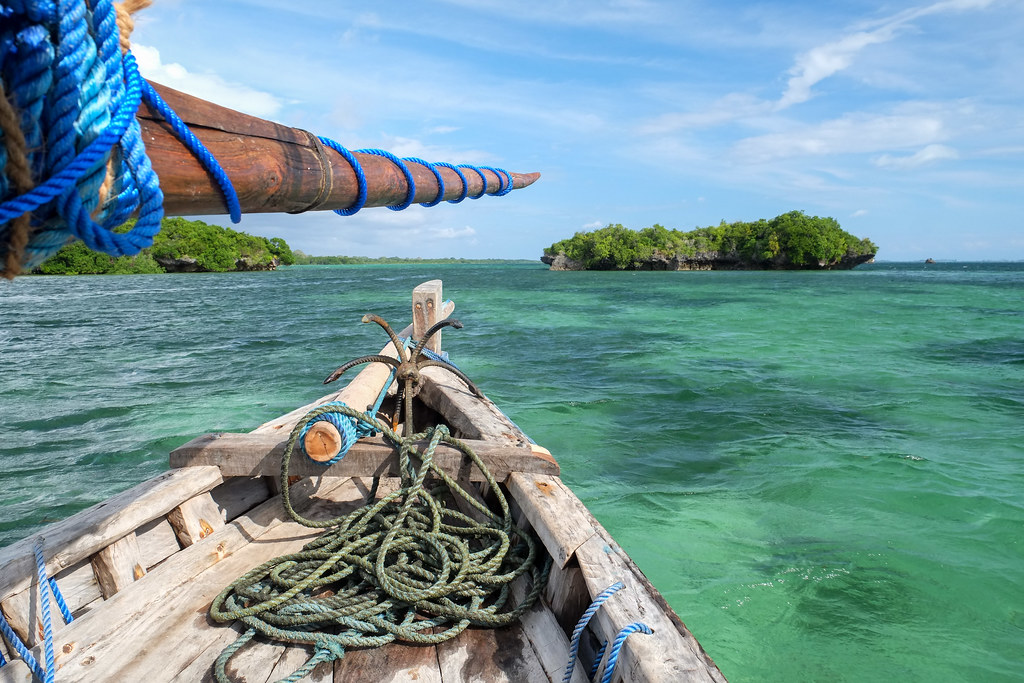
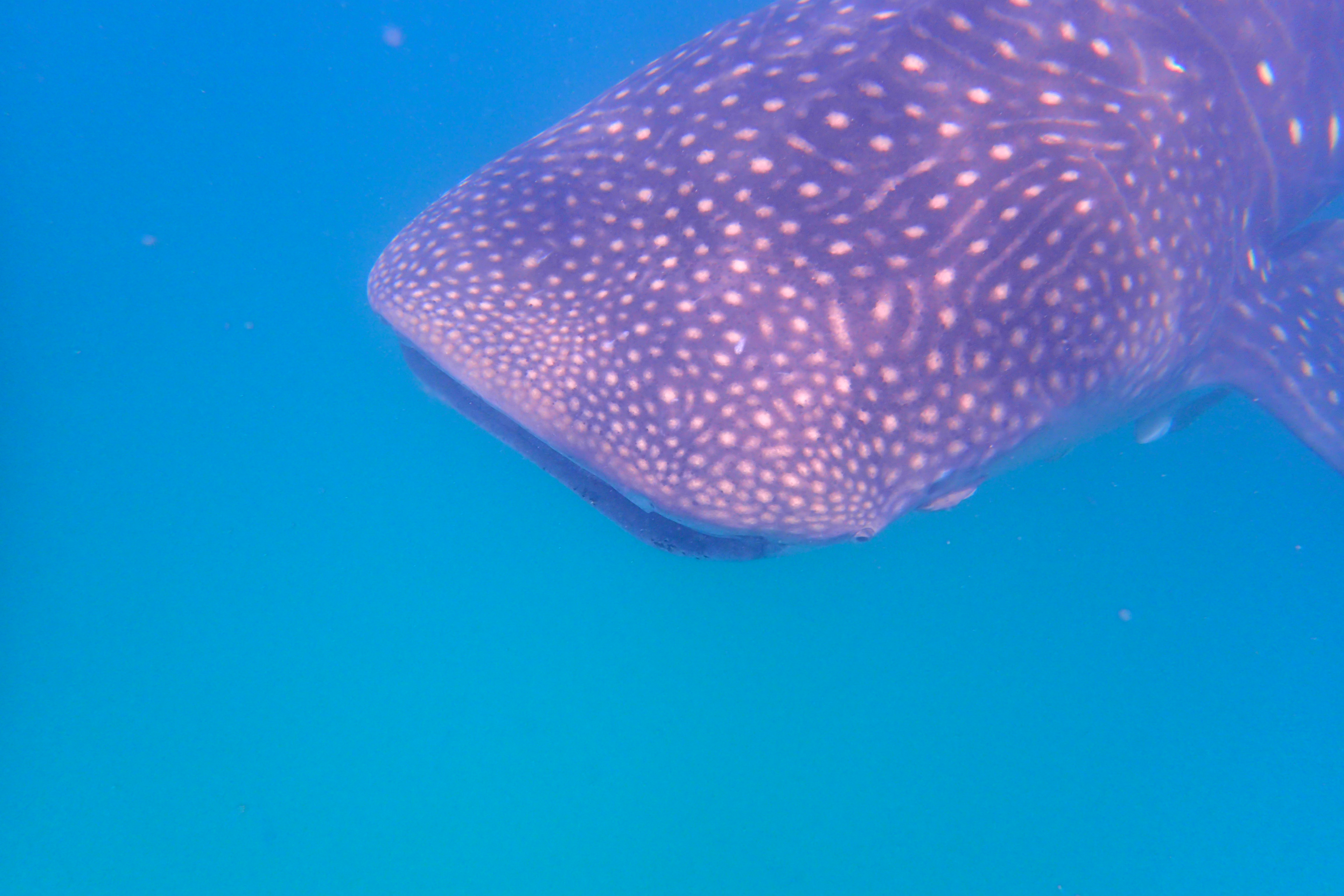
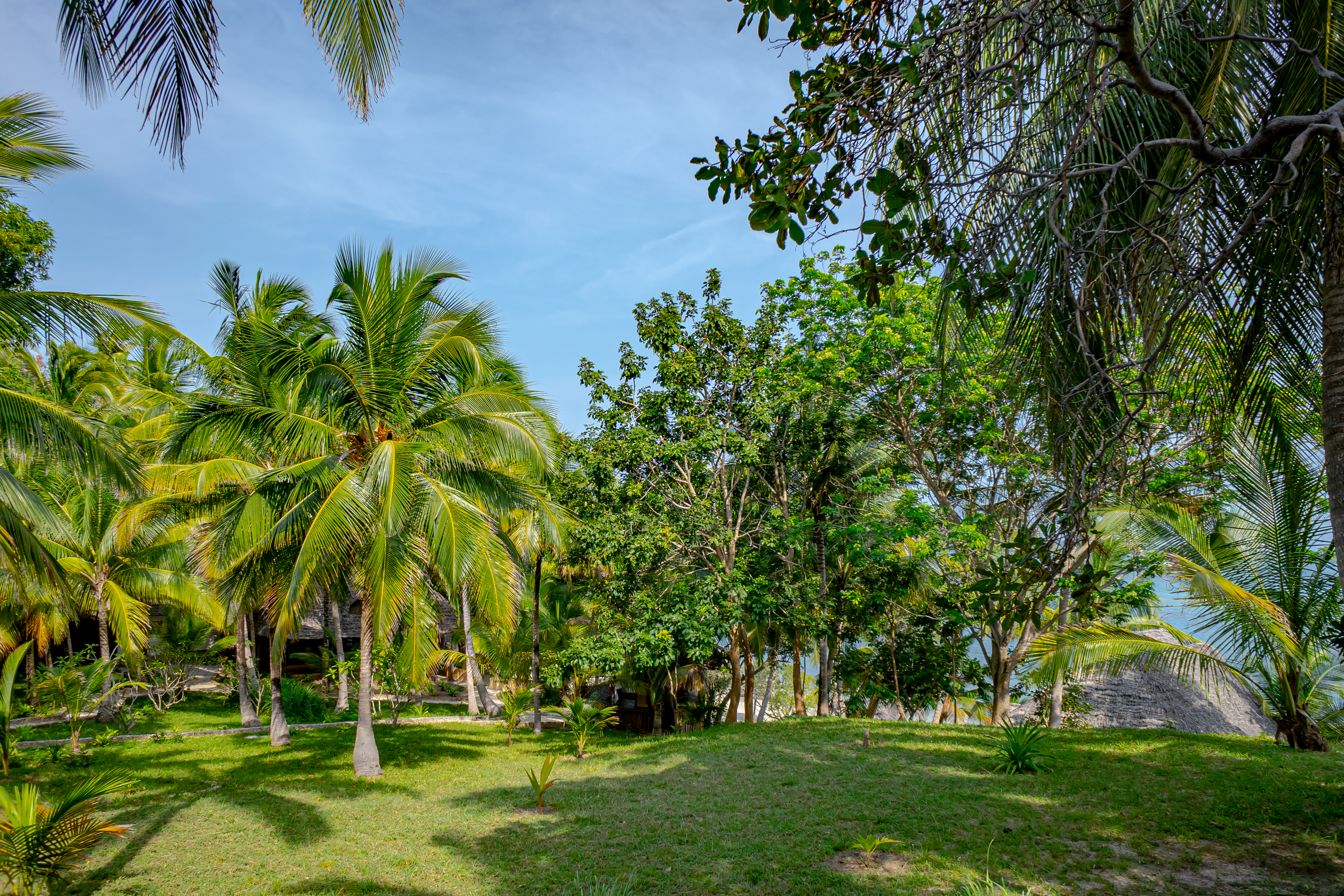
- From top to bottom: Boat in Mafia District, Whale shark in Mafia Island Marine Park & Mangrove and gardens on Mafia Island
- Nickname: Home of the Whale Shark
- Mafia District in Pwani
- Coordinates: 5°3′31.68″S 38°51′8.28″E
- Country: Tanzania
- Region: Pwani Region
- Capital: Kilindoni

Area
  - Total: 642 km^{2} (248 sq mi)
  - Rank: 6th in Pwani
- Highest elevation (Ndagoni ward): 232 m (761 ft)

Population (2012)
  - Total: 46,438
  - Rank: 6th in Pwani
  - Density: 72.3/km^{2} (187/sq mi)

Ethnic groups
  - Settler: Swahili, Bajuni, Pokomo & Omani Arabs
  - Native: Matumbi, Ndengereko & Rufiji
- Time zone: UTC+3 (EAT)
- Tanzanian Postcode: 617
- Website: Mafia District Council
- Symbols of Tanzania
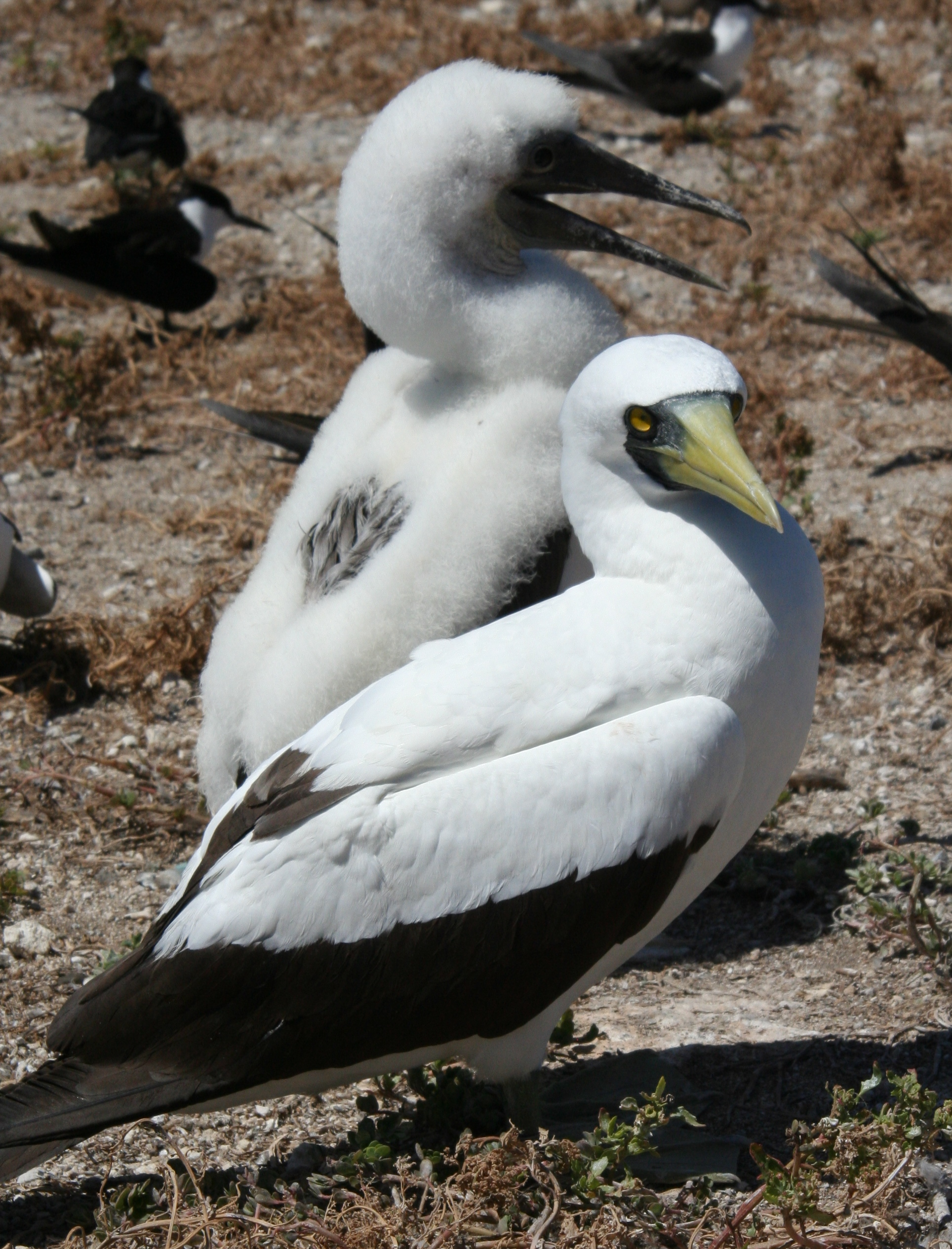
- Bird: Masked booby

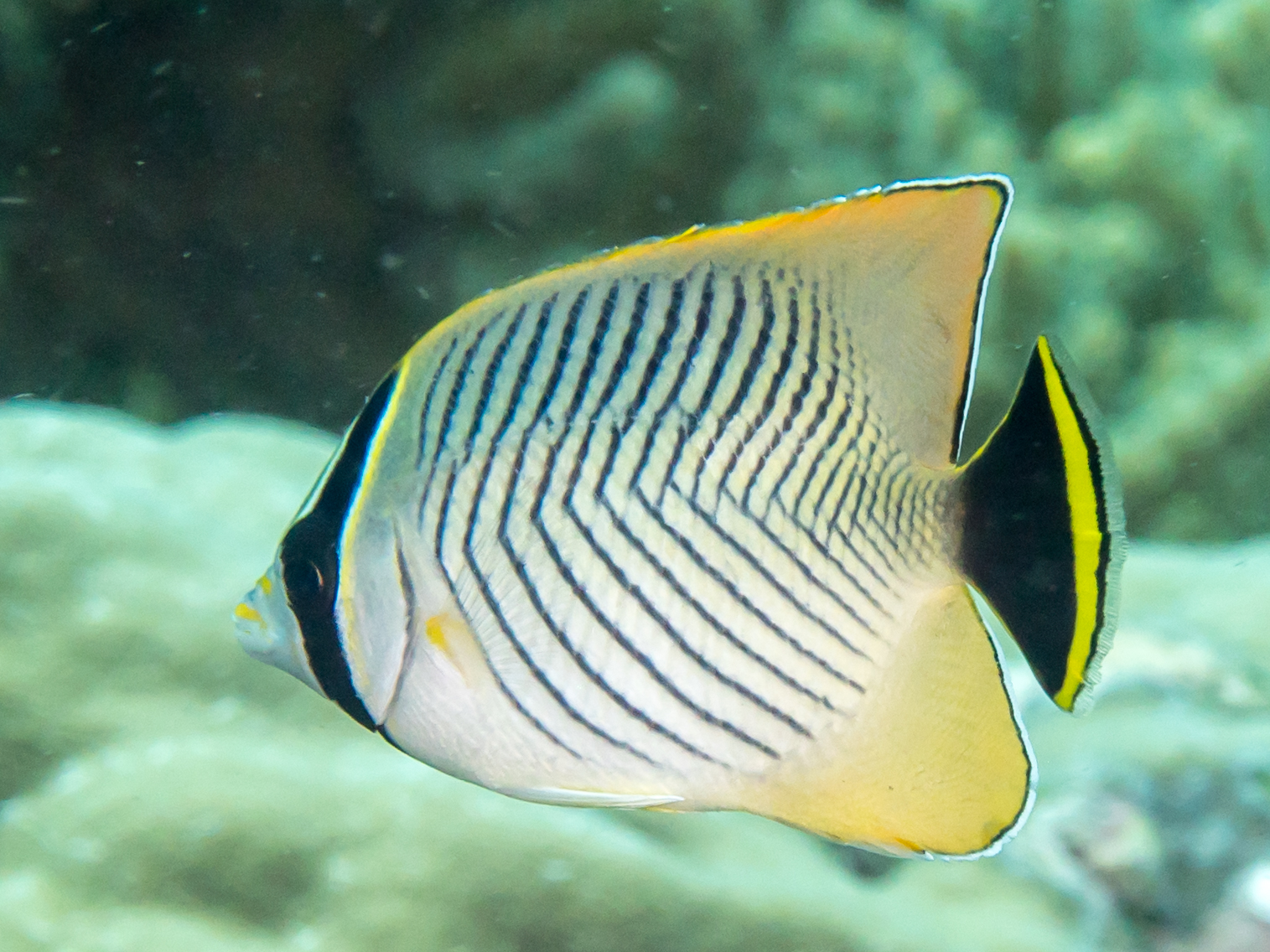
- Fish: Chevron butterflyfish

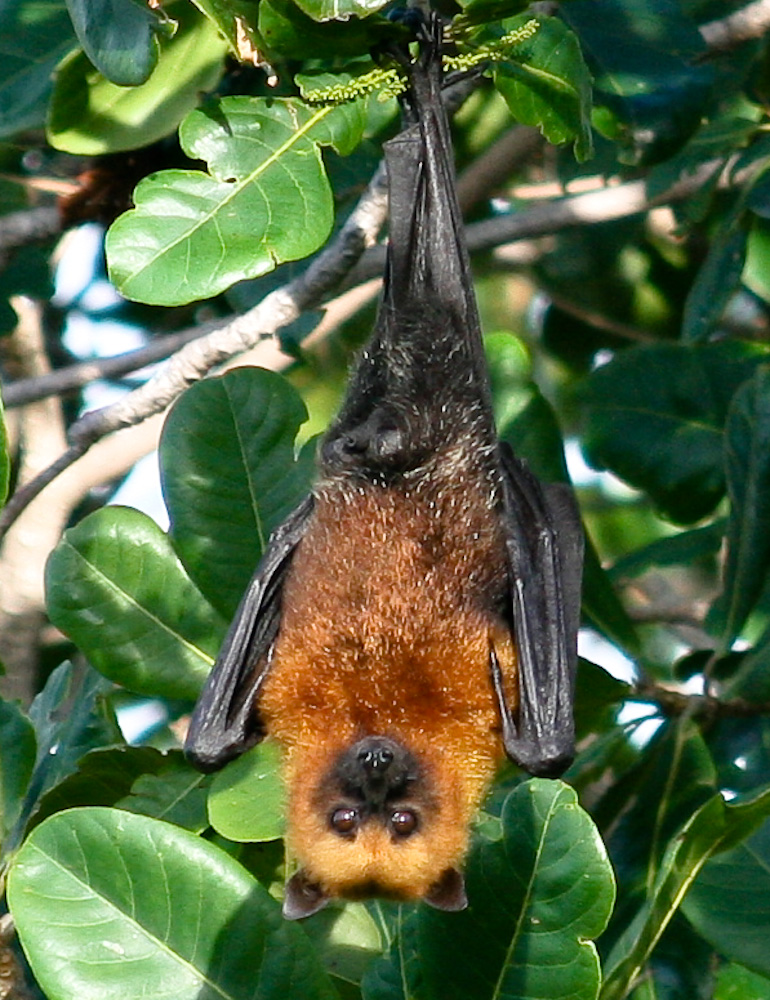
- Mammal: Seychelles flying fox

Mafia District Council (Swahili: Wilaya ya Mafia) is one of eight administrative districts in the Pwani Region of Tanzania. It administers the main Mafia Island as well as the Mafia Archipelago. The district covers an area of 642.6 km^{2} (248.1 sq mi), and is surrounded by the Sea of Zanj. Rufiji District lies on the other side of the Mafia Channel to the west. The district is comparable in size to the land area of Saint Lucia.

The town of Kilindoni serves as its administrative capital. The district is home to the largest concentration of Whale Sharks in Africa, the Mafia Island Marine Park, the historic Chole Island Ruins, the Kisimani Mafia, the Kua Ruins, and the Mlola Forest Reserve. According to the 2012 Tanzania National Census, the population of the Mafia District was 46,438.

== Administrative divisions ==
Mafia District, created in 1959, contains 136 suburbs, 23 villages, 8 wards, and 2 divisions (North and South).

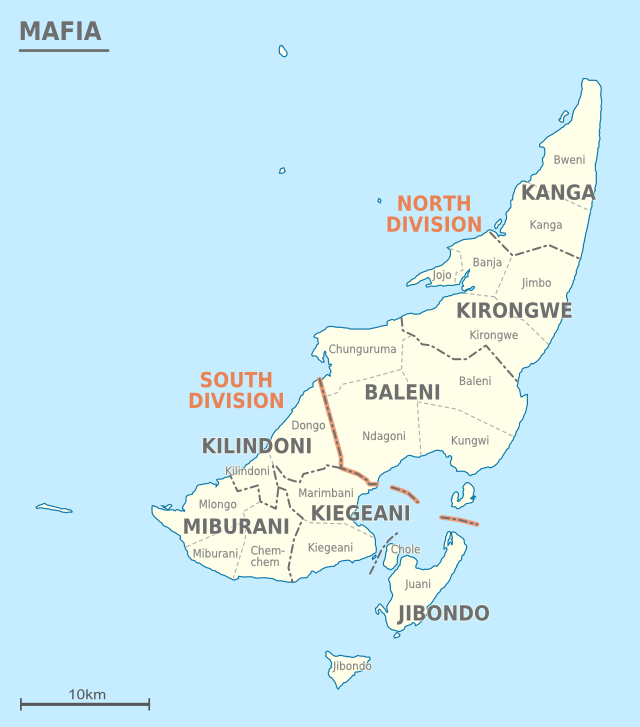
Wards of Mafia District map

The Mafia District is administratively divided into eight wards and twenty villages. Before 2010, The Mafia District had seven wards, when Ndagoni Ward was created from the western part of Baleni Ward.

The wards, alongside their area and population, are listed in the below table:

Ward	Area km^{2}	Population 2002	Population 2012	Division	Villages
Baleni	132.1	9,137	5,870	North	Baleni, Kungwi
Jibondo	21.9	3,405	3,729	South	Jibondo, Chole, Juani
Kanga	52.7	3,317	3,758	North	Kanga, Bweni (Bueni)
Kiegeani	40.3	3,379	4,094	South	Kiegeani (Kiegani) (including Utende), Marimbani
Kilindoni	36.8	11,696	14.221	South	Kilindoni (including Bwejuu), Dongo
Kirongwe	77.0	5,260	5,701	North	Kirongwe, Jimbo (Jimba), Banja, Jojo
Miburani	52.3	4,363	4,106	South	Miburani, Mlongo, Chemuchemu (Chemchem)
Ngadoni	n/a	n/a	4,959	North	Ndagoni, Chunguruma
Mafia Island	413	40,557	46,438	2 divisions	20 villages

== Geography ==
Mafia District is bordered by Mkuranga District, northwest across the Mafia Channel, Rufiji and Kilwa in the Lindi Region to the southwest, and the Indian Ocean to the east and south. Mafia District has a total area of 972 km^{2}, of which 407 km^{2} is made up of land and 565 km^{2} is water. In addition to Mafia Island, there are eight islands within Mafia District: Juani Island, Chole Island, Jibondo Island (Kibondo), Bwejuu Island, Shungumbili Island (Thanda), Barakuni Island, Miewi Island, and Niororo Island (Nyororo).

The eastern side of Mafia District is bordered by the Indian Ocean, with a 33 km outer fringing reef that runs the whole length of the eastern seaboard. It comprises Mafia, Jibondo, and Juani islands, with Kitutia Reef located at the southernmost point.

=== Climate ===
Mafia Island has a hot and sub-humid tropical climate that is affected by two monsoon winds and the East African Equatorial current, which flows north. While the southeast monsoon blows from June to October, the northeast monsoon blows from November to March. Between the varying monsoons, there may be prolonged rainfall. The typical annual rain precipitation is 1,900 mm and the typical annual temperature averages about 26.6°C.

=== Marine National Park ===
More than half of the Mafia Island Marine Park area, which covers an area of 822 km^{2}, is located at a depth of less than 20 meters below mean tide levels. The vast area south of the bay which is bordered by Mafia, Jibondo, and Juani Islands, as well as other reef sections in south Bwejuu, make up the majority of the marine park. The region is home to various tropical marine habitats, including mangrove swamps, coral reefs, and seagrass meadows. Additionally, it is home to a wide variety of fish and other marine species. The park offers a home for two threatened species of sea turtles.

The park also includes a portion of the lowland coastal forest that runs along the island's eastern shore. A total of 23,000 people live inside the park, spread across 14 communities that are entirely or partially located along the park's perimeter.

== History ==
The earliest inhabitants of Mafia Island are Bantu communities from the Matumbi, Ndengereko, and the Rufiji across the Mafia strait on the mainland. On Mafia Island, those who claim to be of Bantu ancestry, yet occasionally identify as Washirazi make up the largest group. This indicates their longstanding Muslim status where they claim to be descended from Persian immigrants who arrived on the East Coast in about the tenth century. However, in Mafia, these individuals frequently refer to themselves as Wambwera rather than Washirazi. Wapokomo, who is claimed to have arrived in the community from northern Kenya during the Portuguese era, belongs to a second, considerably smaller category. Since the Wambwera and the Wapokomo have intermarried, a significant section of the population now considers themselves to be either one depending on the circumstances.

The first written records of the island begin with various conquests starting with the Swahili Sultanate of Kilwa (11th–15th century), then the Portuguese (16th–17th century), Oman Arabs (18th century), the German Empire (1890–1915), and the British Empire (1915–1922).

The coastal civilizations of Swahili city-states were at their height during the 12th and 15th centuries. Their kings and merchants constructed mosques, pillar tombs, and palaces; they issued coins and imported products from most of the known world, including Tang and Ming China. Africans and traders from other parts of the Indian Ocean, particularly the Persian Gulf region, coexisted in these settlements.

Mafia Island had taken a leading role in long-distance trade networks circling the Indian Ocean during the Swahili period. Following its absorption in the 11th century, the Mafia's connection to the sultanate of Kilwa expanded its role in commerce networks. The Kisimani Mafia was founded on the strength of Kilwa's power. Coins recovered at both Kisimani Mafia and Kua also demonstrate this. According to the discovery of Kilwa coins, Kisimani peaked during the 11th and 13th centuries. The Kilwa Chronicle also mentions that some of the first Kilwa sultan's sons made their way to Kisimani Mafia, a modern-day name for the island's southwest tip. The Mafia Island was taken over by the Portuguese when they came in the 16th century. To oversee and protect the trade connections with the far east of the island, they constructed a fort on the east coast.

Since the Kilwa sultanate, colonial control has had a mixed impact on the history of the Mafia archipelago. Both German and British colonial rule have had a significant impact on the Island's current sociopolitical situation.

According to historian Revington, slaves of affluent people whose descendants now live in Kua and Kisimani Mafia were the main inhabitants of Mafia Island during the 17th century. The Madagascar-born Sakalava people "arrived with small canoes called 'laka' and captured many people" in the 18th century, raiding local treasuries of these small cities on Mafia Island. Despite the eventual release of the prisoners, Kua was never again conquered, and as a result of the attack, the sultan's capital was transferred to Chole Island.

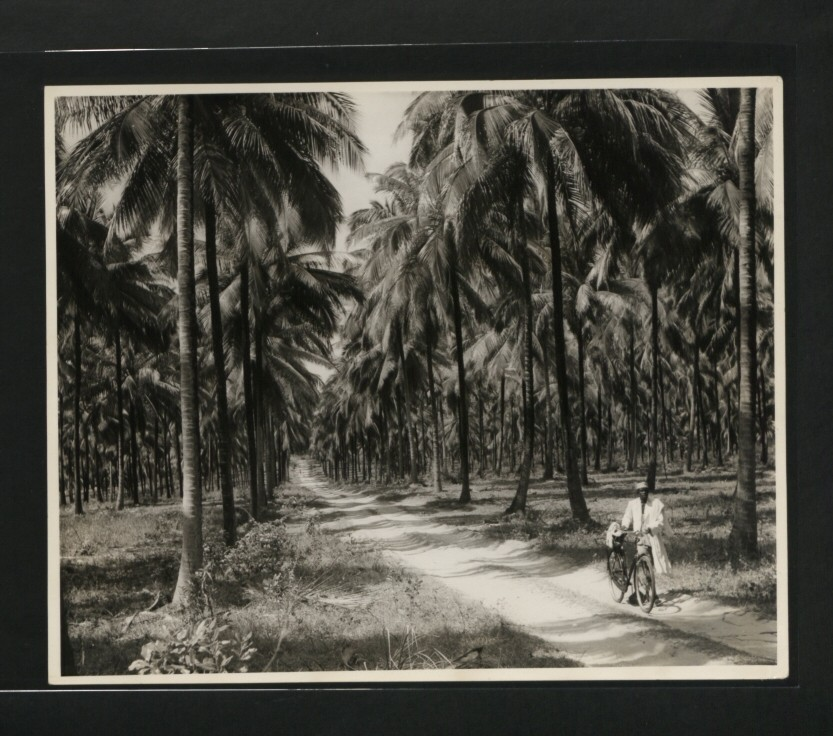
Coconut Plantation on Mafia Island during the British occupation

The Imams of Muscat took over control of the Mafia at the beginning of the 18th century. This gained momentum when the Omani Sultan Seyyid Said moved his headquarters to Zanzibar and annexed the islands. During the Omani Arab colonial era, many Arab settlers moved to the southern region of Mafia, where they established extensive coconut plantations that relied on enslaved labor brought from the mainland. The original Mafia residents, who went by the names Wambwera or Washirazi, were driven into the northern region of the island, where the soil is better suited for sustaining crops than for coconuts.

Mafia, which had been a part of the Sultan of Zanzibar's realm, became part of German East Africa in 1890. The production of coconuts increased. To produce copra, which was widely used at the time in various industries, and to generate revenue for taxes, the Germans established large plantations and mandated that all adult males plant at least fifty coconut trees.

After the borders between Germany and the British Empire were established in 1890, the German Empire took control of the Mafia Island. In 1912, the German Empire relocated from Chole to Kilindoni, the former Mafia capital. British troops captured the Mafia in 1915, and in 1922, it was incorporated into the Tanganyika Territory. More European-owned coconut plantations were established in the south of Mafia during the British era. After the enslaved peoples were emancipated by the British administration in 1922, the Arab plantations went into decline.

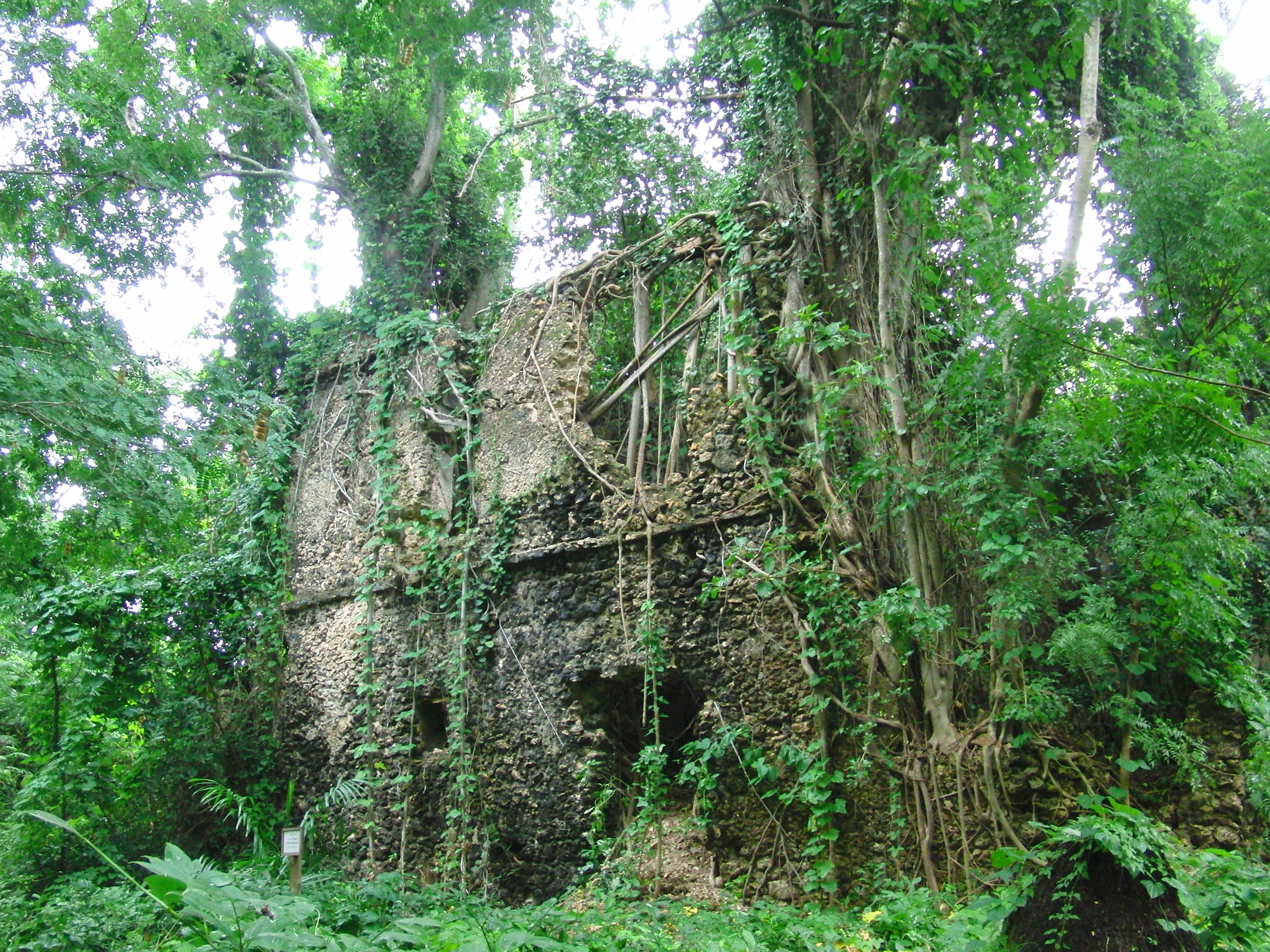
Swahili era Ruins on Chole island, Mafia District

=== Archaeology ===
The oldest ruins are found in Kisimani Mafia, which is close to Kilindoni. The earliest strata of mosques, according to archaeologist Neville Chittick, who performed excavations in the 1950s, date from about the 10th and 11th centuries. However, many of them have since been washed into the sea. A second British archaeological expedition in the 1950s discovered coins from the 13th to the 15th centuries on Juani island. While many archaeologists date Kua to this period, others suggest a later timeframe. Tanzanian archaeologist Felix Chami recently completed his research on Mafia Island, contributing to discussions about the origins of the Swahili peoples along the coast and their connections to both the interior of Africa and the Indian Ocean. On Juani Island, he also recently conducted a cave excavation.

=== Etymology ===
The names of the archipelago have been up for debate among academics. In the late 19th century, The Mafia's major island was depicted as Chole Shamba and its smaller island, Chole Mjini. Following the sacking of Kua by the Sakalafa in the 18th century, Arab elites moved to the small island that came to be known as Chole Mjini and Chole Shamba, respectively. Some academics suggest that the name Mafia originated after the Portuguese arrived in the late 16th to early 17th century as a shortened version of their spelling of Monifiyeh. Mafia is referred to as Monfia in the Kilwa Chronicles, and it appears to have been named and included in the realm of the first sultan of Kilwa, Ali ibn al-Hassan Shirazi, who had dispatched his son to conquer the region in around 1000 AD. It is believed that the Portuguese, who later controlled the Indian Ocean, abbreviated the term to Mafia.

== Economy ==
Since ancient times, Mafia Island's economy was mixed but mostly agrarian, depending on subsistence, fishing and commercial agriculture. Growing coconuts, taro, dry and wet rice, cassava, beans, peas, maize, tomatoes, and other crops are more prevalent towards the north of the island, where there is more access to bushland. The majority of the southern side of the island is covered in coconut and cashew nut trees, the two longest-running cash crops for the Mafia. Direct exports to markets of Dar es Salaam are made for both the larger cashew nut crop and the smaller coconut crop. Both crops' prices have varied recently. In 2012, unemployment in Mafia District was 1.5%.

=== Tourism ===
Tourism on Mafia Island has grown quickly, with numerous small hotels being built, especially inside the Marine Park in Utende in the southeast corner of the island, in large part due to the presence of the Mafia Island Marine Park. The majority of visitors come to take advantage of diving, snorkeling, fishing, and seeing the whale sharks. Flights run by Auric Air or Coastal Aviation take passengers from Dar es Salaam to Mafia Airport.

=== Sport fishing ===
The majority of sport fishing is done in Mafia Island waters within 40 km from the lodge, in places like Forbes Bay. Kinassi Passes, Chole Bay, Rass Mkumbi, Fungu Sefu, Tunny Bay, Okuza Island of the Songosongo Archipelago, and Nyuni off Juani, off sheikh yusuf, off Miewi Island, Jibondo Gap, and Kibondo Island are additional locations of sport fishing. However, Tutia Reef is regarded to be one of the best locations for fishing.

Rock cod (Kiswahili name Chewa), spotty cod or foursaddle grouper, dolphin fish (Kiswahili name Faloosi, Panje), wahoo, and kingfish (Kiswahili name Nguru ngaziga) are some of the area's most well-known sports fish. Wahoo (Acanthocybium solandri), barracuda (Sphyraena barracuda, Kiswahili name Mzia), Striped marlin (Kiswahili name Nduaw) and Sailfish (Kiswahili name Mbassi, nsulinsah) are some examples of fish found in the Mafian waters. Skipjack (Kiswahili name Sehewa), Yellowfin Tuna (Kiswahili name Jodari), Caranx ignobilis (Kiswahili name Karambesi), Caranx melampygus (Kiswahili name Kole Kole), Red snapper, and others are also found in these waters.

December through March is the recommended time of year to go sport fishing, especially for reef species. However, due to the northeast monsoon's intense winds during most of January and part of February, late February is regarded as the safest time to go fishing. During the off-season, from May to August, only a few kingfish might be seen. Kingfish come in great numbers from September to November, as the monsoon starts to shift back to the north.

== Demographics ==
The District has 46,438 residents according to the 2012 Tanzania National Census. Mafia District has an adult literacy rate of 77.3%, primarily in Swahili. Historically, six cognatic descent groups on the island, who hold authority over the majority of the land, include the Wapokomo and the Wambwera. Many people belong and identify with various groups at various times and in various circumstances as a result of out-group marriage. However, the number of groups to which an individual can belong is constrained by the preference of kin marriage, in which marriage is to a person with a common ancestry group. The remaining people are Wabajuni immigrants, a single Hadhrami Arab family, and a small number of descendants of formerly enslaved individuals slaves who have intermarried with the freeborn Wapokomo and Wambwera. These groups are not part of the hierarchical descent-based structure.

== Historic social stratification of Mafia Island ==
The social structure in the village of Minazini is complex. The Ibadhi Muslims in Mafia Island are a minority population of Arabs, compared to the Sunni Muslims, and have little interaction with other settlements. However, individuals recognized for their Islamic piety occupy the highest positions within their local social hierarchy. This group includes certain Sharifs (believed to be descendants of the Prophet Muhammad), members of the Wabajuni—immigrants who claim Arab ancestry—and the family of a Sheikh originally from Zanzibar who settled in the area and intermarried with select members of the Wambwera community.

The intermediate ranks of the social structure consist of the Wambwera—who generally do not intermarry with the Wapokomo—followed by individuals of mixed Wambwera-Pokomo origin, and then the Wapokomo, in descending order. Descendants of slaves are located at the bottom of the social structure. The Wabajuni and the Sheikh's family members have the majority of the political power in the village, primarily through their control over the Friday mosque and village council offices. These groups have also rejected rituals, a decision that appears to be associated with efforts to differentiate themselves from the rest of the villagers and maintain political influence.
