= Jibondo Island =

Island of the Mafia Archipelago in Pwani Region, Tanzania

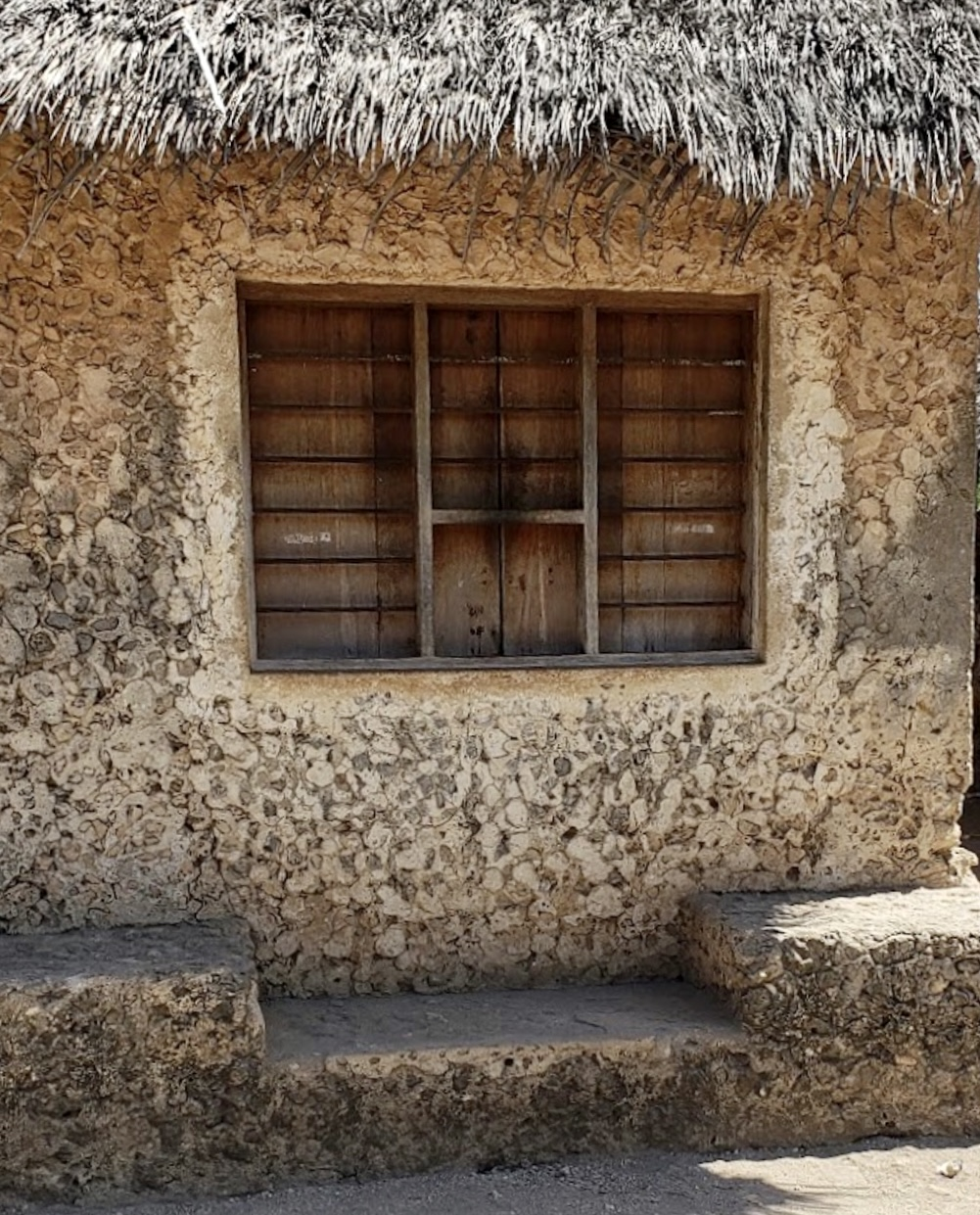
- House widow on Jibondo Island

- Location on the Mafia Archipelago

Geography
- Location: Sea of Zanj
- Coordinates: 8°0′8.64″S 39°46′50.52″E
- Archipelago: The Mafia Archipelago
- Length: 3.2 km (1.99 mi)
- Width: 3.2 km (1.99 mi)

Administration
- Tanzania
- Region: Pwani Region
- District: Mafia District
- Ward: Jibondo

Demographics
- Languages: Swahili
- Ethnic groups: Matumbi, Ndengereko & Rufiji

Jibondo Island (Kisiwa cha Jibondo, in Swahili) is an island of the Mafia Archipelago located in Jibondo ward of Mafia District in southern Pwani Region of Tanzania. After Juani Island, which is to its east, the island is the third largest in the archipelago. Mafia Island is to the north, and the Mafia Channel is to the west and south. Jibondo ward is named after the island. The island is part of the Mafia Island Marine Park.

== History ==
A 15th-century Swahili mosque's ruins may be found on Jibondo Island, which is close to the coast.
