= Kisimani Mafia =

National Historic Site of Tanzania

- Location within Tanzania
- 7°56′44.6″S 39°35′46.6″E
- Type: Settlement
- Cultures: Swahili
- Location: Miburani, Mafia District, Pwani Region, Tanzania

History
- Built: 10th Century CE
- Abandoned: 15th Century CE

Site notes
- Material: Coral rag
- Architectural style: Swahili
- Condition: Critically Endangered
- Owner: Tanzanian Government
- Management: Antiquities Division, Ministry of Natural Resources and Tourism

National Historic Sites of Tanzania
- Official name: Kisimani Historic Site
- Type: Cultural

Kisimani Mafia (Magofu ya kale ya Kisimani Mafia in Swahili ) is a national historic site located in Miburani ward in the Mafia Archipelago of Pwani Region's Mafia District. They are Mafia's oldest ruins, which are close to the district's capital of Kilindoni. The earliest strata of mosques, according to archaeologist Neville Chittick who performed excavations there in the 1950s, date from about the tenth and eleventh centuries. However, many of them have since been washed into the Mafia Channel.

Tanzanian archaeologist Felix Chami has recently finished his work on the Mafia, pushing back the origins of the Swahili peoples of the coast and their connections to both the interior of Africa and the Indian Ocean. Ancient coins occasionally turn up on beach washouts, and portions of the crumbling walls can be seen in the ocean just offshore.
