= Rufiji =

Rufiji may refer to:

- Rufiji Delta, a region in Tanzania
- Rufiji District, in the Pwani Region of Tanzania
- Rufiji River, in Tanzania
- Rufiji (ethnic group), of eastern Tanzania
- Rufiji language, spoken by the Rufiji people
