= Tutia Reef =

Protected of the Mafia Archipelago in Pwani Region, Tanzania

- IUCN category II (national park)
- Location within Tanzania
- Location: Tanzania, Pwani Region, Mafia District's Mafia Channel
- Nearest city: Dar es Salaam
- Coordinates: 8°07′48″S 39°39′21″E
- Length: 3.1 km (1.9 mi)
- Width: 2.4 km (1.5 mi)
- Established: March 2007
- Governing body: Marine Parks & Reserves Authority (Tanzania)
- Website: MIMP

Tutia Reef (Miamba ya Tutia, in Swahili) is a system of protected coral reefs inside the Mafia Island Marine Park (MIMP) with the IUCN category II designation. The reef is located on Tanzania's Mafia Archipelago of Mafia District in southern Pwani Region of Tanzania. Tutia Reef is rated as the country's top spot for sport fishing, however the reef is also the site some of the worst coral bleaching events in history in 1998. The reef is located south west of Jibondo Island inside the Mafia Channel.

== Formation ==
Off the coast of Rufiji Delta, the Tutia Reef is a coral reef. Its formation and structure have been determined that the reef was created in part by cutting back the flat of the older reef, which was 14 feet above the level of the current reef, and in part by the reef growing seaward. An evaluation of the reef's living coral cover is made based on lines of quadrats running down three of its sides, and the distribution of the main corals of the reef is reported. Contrary to Crossland assertions, it is proposed that many coral reefs in East Africa are expanding outward.

== Biodiversity ==
A link between the distribution of living coral on the reef and the distribution of fish on the reef is demonstrated at the reef. On the reef, there is a limited distribution of several fish species. The fishes' feeding relationships are analysed, and several feeding categories are established for the entire fish biomass. Comparing the results from Eniwetok Atoll obtained by Odum & Odum in1955 with those from Tutia Reef reveals a low biomass of herbivorous fishes. This is thought to be because Tutia Reef demonstrates traits of an outer reef, getting a large portion of its energy from plankton, rather than those of an enclosed and nearly autotrophic lagoon.

== Coral bleaching ==
Tanzania's coral reefs suffered significant bleaching in 1998. The subsequent coral death raised concerns about the destruction of coral reefs and the depletion of all resources. Coral bleaching affected 90% the coral reef species at Tutia Reef in Tanzania's Mafia Island Marine Park, the highest recorded. An experiment was done on the reef with Acropora formosa corals from nearby reef patches transplanted into plots, and the reef's structure and accompanying fish populations were studied before and after the bleaching event. 88% of all corals perished as a result of the coral bleaching of 1998.

A significant fraction of the dead corals were still standing a year after the incident. Results revealed that genetic variation may affect bleaching tolerance because living and dead corals came from different clones. Following the bleaching event, there was a change in the makeup of the fish community and an increase in fish abundance. However, the diversity of species was less impacted. Following disruption, there was a connection between structure complexity and fish concentrations.

The study suggests that the reef may support a large fish population as long as the structural integrity of the reef is maintained. It is difficult to predict how the coral beaching event may affect fisheries. There are multiple varieties of fish caught off the Tutia Reef, and different sustainable fishing methods are employed. As a wide variety of species, including smaller fish, are targeted, catches might not decrease as long as the reef structure is preserved. Fish abundance is likely to decline, though, if reef destruction follows.
