= Mafia Archipelago =

Archipelago of Pwani Region, Tanzania

The Mafia Archipelago
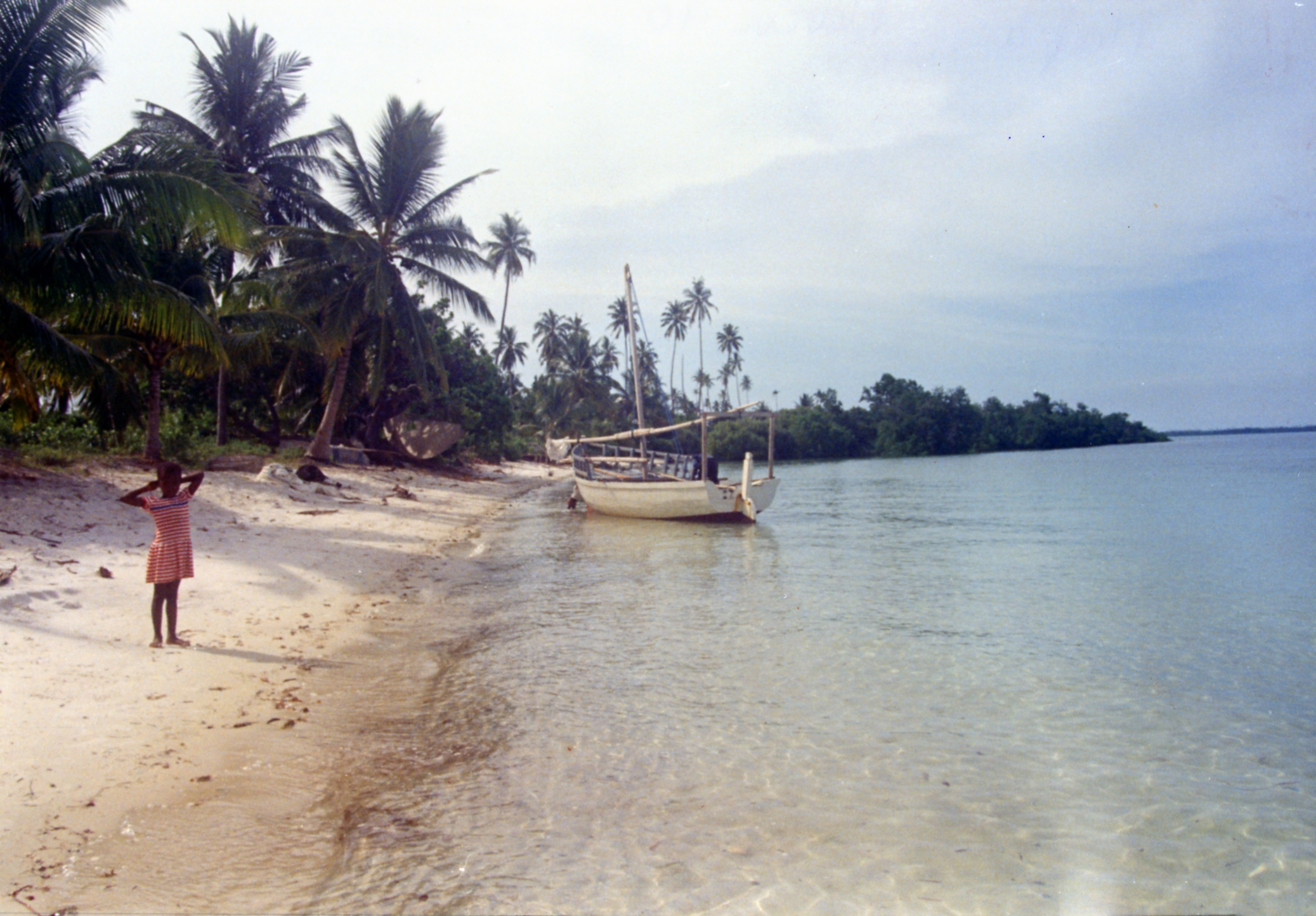
- Main Mafia Island in the Mafia Archipelago

- Location within Tanzania

Geography
- Location: Sea of Zanj in western Indian Ocean
- Coordinates: 7°51′S 39°47′E
- Total islands: 9
- Major islands: Mafia Island and Juani Island
- Area: 972 km^{2} (375 sq mi)
- Highest elevation: 15 m (49 ft)

Administration
- Tanzania
- Region: Pwani Region
- District: Mafia District

Demographics
- Population: 46,438 (2012)
- Languages: Swahili
- Ethnic groups: Matumbi, Ndengereko & Rufiji

The Mafia Archipelago or the Mafia Islands (Funguvisiwa vya Mafia, in Swahili) is a group of islands across the Mafia Channel in the Mafia District of Pwani Region's coast on the Sea of Zanj in Tanzania's Indian Ocean coast. The archipelago is composed of 9 islands and around 12 coral reefs. In total, the Mafia archipelago covers 972 km^{2} (375 sq mi) in total, of which 8.5 km^{2} (3.3 sq mi) 407 km2 are land and 565 km2 are water. and has an average elevation of 53 m (174 ft). Of the 12 reefs in the archipelago the most famous one is the Tutia Reef. The largest island in the archipelago is Mafia Island also known as Chole Shamba locally. The other eight islands inside Mafia District in addition to Mafia Island are; Juani Island, Chole Island, Jibondo Island (Kibondo), Bwejuu Island, Shungumbili Island (Thanda), Barakuni Island, Miewi Island, and Niororo Island (Nyororo).

== Geography ==
Off Tanzania's central coast, close to the Rufiji Delta, is a collection of islands known as the Mafia Archipelago. The main island is up to 20 kilometers wide and roughly 50 kilometers long (from North to South). Mafia is not a coral island, unlike Zanzibar, but rather an elevated piece of the African continental shelf. However, the group's smaller islands, Chole, Juani, and Jibondo, are a part of the large coral reef system that runs down the East African Coast. Contrary to common belief, Mafia is not built entirely of sand and coconut roots. Instead, the island's soils vary greatly, from very sandy in the north to firm fertile soil portions that are dispersed throughout the southern portion of the island.

Rice and cassava serve as the backbone of the diet in the middle ridge, which normally does not reach over 50 meters, while coconut palms are planted in the more arid regions as a commercial crop. As a new resource for the economy, cashew nuts are becoming more significant. The entire island is covered in inhabited and cultivated, with the exception of the eastern beaches where coral rock prevents cultivation.

The eastern side of Mafia is exposed to the full force of the Sea of Zanj in Indian Ocean, and a 33 km outer fringing reef that is made up of the islands of Mafia, Jibondo, and Juani, with Kitutia Reef at its southernmost end, spans the length of the eastern seaboard of the Mafia Channel.

The East African Equatorial current, which travels north, and two monsoon winds have an impact on Mafia Archipelago's hot and subhumid tropical climate. The northeast monsoon blows from November to March, while the southeast monsoon blows from June to October. We might observe the persistent rainfall in between the many monsoons. The normal annual temperatures are 26.6 °C and 1,900 mm of precipitation.

== History ==
The first inhabitants of the islands were Bantu peoples from the mainland. As a sea-based region of the Swahili culture, the Mafia Archipelago has a diverse population, which reflects its turbulent past. The islands have always been a part of the Swahili cumene, which emerged as a result of Arab and Persian infiltration of a Bantu culture starting about the first century A.D. The main island, Mafia, does not appear to have ever given rise to a separate governmental entity, a situation that has persisted to the present. It was only known as an outpost of Kilwa during the Middle Ages. Unaffected by the brutal Portuguese incursions of the 16th century, it gradually came under the control of the Busaidi Sultans of Oman in the 18th and 19th centuries. In 1840, they finally drove the Court of Oman to Zanzibar, establishing their authority. Mafia was taken under German sovereignty in 1880 as a result of European colonial negotiations, and it later became a part of German East Africa, or Tanganyika.

The Mafia Archipelago later became a nominal part of the Tanganyika Mandate Territory of the League of Nations, but real administration from 1915 to 1922 was conducted out by the Zanzibar Government after the British drove the Germans off the island during World War I. After that date, the Tanganyika Territory Government legally took over the administrative duties. It has been a part of the United Republic of Tanzania since 1964, when Tanganyika and Zanzibar united following the latter island's revolution.

== Conservation ==
In 1995, a portion of the archipelago was declared a marine park under the Tanzania Marine parks Authority, a department of the Ministry of Natural Resources and Tourism. The Islands are known as a major breeding ground for whale sharks. At a depth of less than 20 meters below mean tide levels is where more than half of the Mafia Island Marine Park, which has an area of 822 km2, is situated. The bulk of the marine park consists of other reef portions in south Bwejuu Island and the wide area south of the bay surrounded by Mafia, Jibondo, and Juani Islands. A magnificent mosaic of tropical marine ecosystems, including mangrove swamps, coral reefs, and seagrass meadows, may be found in the area. It also supports a huge diversity of fish and other top marine species. Two endangered kinds of sea turtles can find a home in the park.
