= Fiji language =

Fiji could be

- Fijian language
- Rufiji language

== See also ==
- Fiji Hindi
