= Mafia Island =

Island of the Mafia Archipelago in Pwani Region, Tanzania

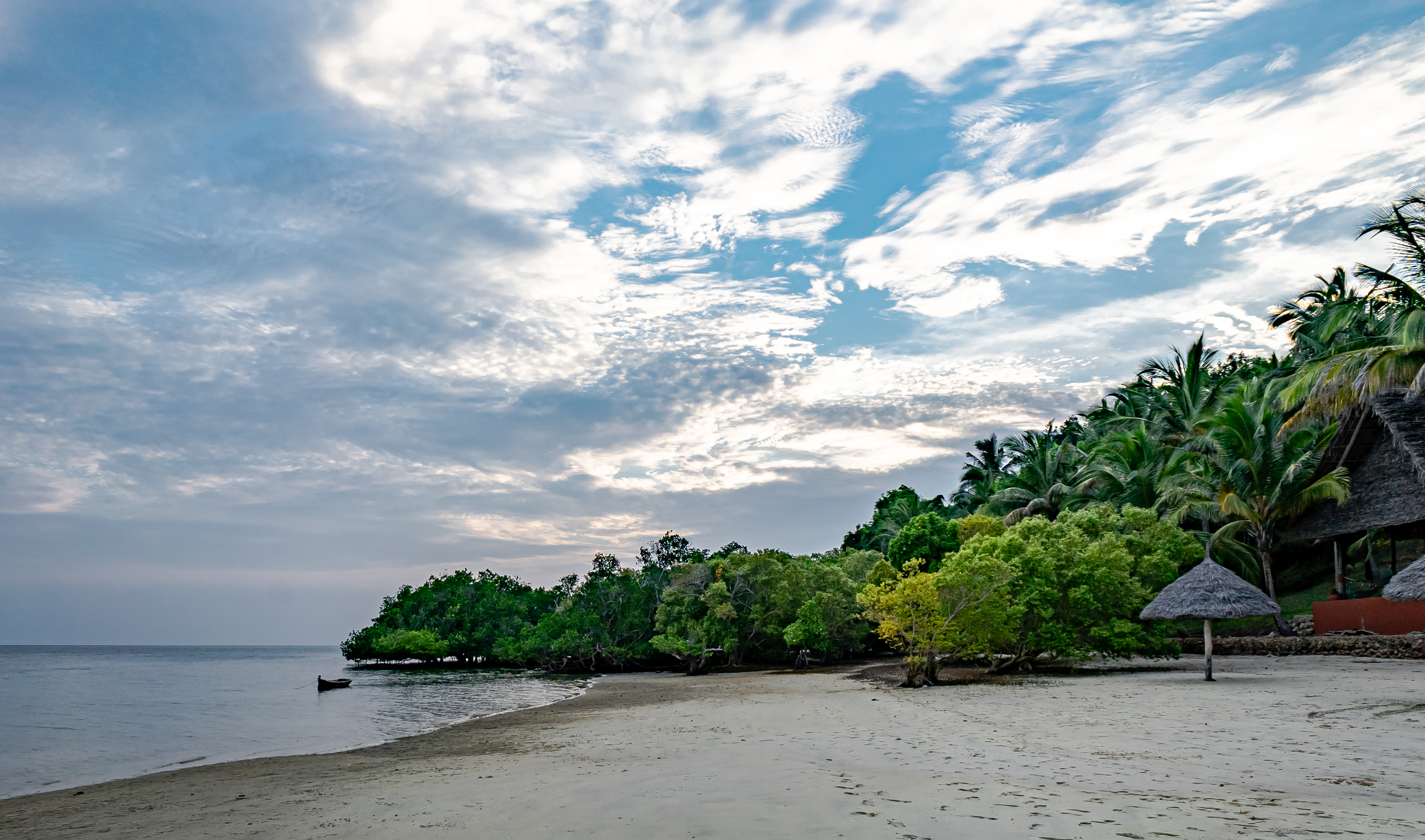
- Mafia Island

- Location of Mafia Island

Geography
- Location: Sea of Zanj
- Coordinates: 7°51′S 39°47′E
- Archipelago: The Mafia Islands Archipelago
- Total islands: 9
- Major islands: Juani Island and Jibondo Island
- Area: 435 km^{2} (168 sq mi)
- Length: 49 km (30.4 mi)
- Width: 17 km (10.6 mi)
- Highest elevation: 53 m (174 ft)
- Highest point: Ndogani

Administration
- Tanzania
- Region: Pwani Region
- District: Mafia District

Demographics
- Population: 66,180 (2022)
- Languages: Swahili
- Ethnic groups: Matumbi, Ndengereko, and Rufiji

Mafia Island or Chole Shamba (Kisiwa cha Mafia, in Swahili) is an island of the Mafia Archipelago located in Mafia District in the southern Pwani Region of Tanzania across the Mafia Channel. The island is the third largest in Tanzanian ocean territory, but is not administratively included within the semi-autonomous region of Zanzibar, which has been politically separate since 1890. Mafia Island forms the largest part of Mafia District, one of the six administrative districts in the Pwani Region. As the Mafia Archipelago's main island, it is sometimes called Chole Shamba, meaning Chole farmlands in Swahili. This is in opposition to the historic settlement of Chole Mjini (Chole town) on Chole Island inside Mafia Bay. The island's population is over 65,000. The economy is based on fishing, subsistence agriculture and the market in Kilindoni. The island attracts some tourists, mainly scuba divers, birdwatchers, game fishermen, and people seeking relaxation.

== Geography ==
Mafia Island, (394 km^{2} (152 sq mi)), lies off the east coast of Tanzania opposite the delta of the Rufiji River. The 20 kilometres (12 mi) wide stretch of water between the delta and the island is called the Mafia Channel. Mafia Island is part of a small archipelago with several much smaller islands, some of which are inhabited. The main town on Mafia is Kilindoni on the west coast. On the east coast is Chole Bay, Mafia's protected deep-water anchorage and original harbour. The bay is studded with islets, sandbanks and beaches, and is protected from the east by reefs and Juani Island.

The northernmost point on the island is a coral cliff rising approximately 4.5 metres (15 ft) above the sea called Ras Mkumbi, beyond the cliff the land gradually rises to 24 metres (79 ft). There is a lighthouse at Ras Mkumbi.

=== Climate ===
Mafia Island has a tropical climate. This climate is classified as "Aw" by the Köppen-Geiger system. The average temperature in town of Kilindoni is 26.7 °C (80.1 °F). The average annual rainfall is 1,705 mm. The monthly average temperatures are usually between 24.8 and 28.3 °C (76.6 and 82.9 °F). There is one major rain season, with most rainfall coming between March and May. Dry season spans between July and October.

Climate data for Kilindoni
Month	Jan	Feb	Mar	Apr	May	Jun	Jul	Aug	Sep	Oct	Nov	Dec	Year
Mean daily maximum °C (°F)	31.3 (88.3)	31.6 (88.9)	31.3 (88.3)	29.9 (85.8)	29.3 (84.7)	28.3 (82.9)	27.5 (81.5)	28.2 (82.8)	29.3 (84.7)	30.3 (86.5)	30.6 (87.1)	31.1 (88.0)	29.9 (85.8)
Daily mean °C (°F)	28.3 (82.9)	28.3 (82.9)	28.1 (82.6)	27.0 (80.6)	26.4 (79.5)	25.4 (77.7)	24.8 (76.6)	25.0 (77.0)	25.7 (78.3)	26.8 (80.2)	27.2 (81.0)	27.8 (82.0)	26.7 (80.1)
Mean daily minimum °C (°F)	25.3 (77.5)	25.1 (77.2)	25.0 (77.0)	24.2 (75.6)	23.5 (74.3)	22.6 (72.7)	22.1 (71.8)	21.9 (71.4)	22.2 (72.0)	23.3 (73.9)	23.9 (75.0)	24.6 (76.3)	23.6 (74.5)
Average precipitation mm (inches)	134 (5.3)	98 (3.9)	234 (9.2)	482 (19.0)	260 (10.2)	80 (3.1)	49 (1.9)	25 (1.0)	22 (0.9)	35 (1.4)	102 (4.0)	184 (7.2)	1,705 (67.1)
Source: Climate-Data.ORG

=== Geology ===
Mafia Island, and the associated archipelago were formed by rifting and uplift of part of the continental shelf during the Pleistocene.

== Ecology ==
The main ecosystems on the island are mangrove swamps, coastal forests, scrublands, and grasslands. A 115,000 ha area, encompassing Chole Bay, the southern coastline of Mafia and its associated smaller islands, along with the intervening marine waters, has been designated an Important Bird Area (IBA) by BirdLife International because it supports populations of western reef egrets, Terek sandpipers and crab plovers. Mafia Island is home to fruitbats (flying foxes) of the genus Pteropus.

== History ==
Mafia Island is mentioned at least as early as the 8th century. The island once played a major role in ancient trade between the people of East Asia and East Africa. It was a regular stop for Arab boats. On the tiny island of Chole Mjini, just offshore in Chole Bay, once stood a settlement, which constituted one of the most important towns controlling trade from the silver mines of eastern Zimbabwe, which reached the town via the old ports of Kilwa and Michangani. In the mid-1820s, the town of Kua on Juani Island was attacked by Sakalava cannibals arriving from Madagascar with 80 canoes, who ate many of the locals and took the rest into slavery. A 3D documentation of the Kua Ruins on Juani Island was carried out in 2018 by the Zamani Project.

Under a treaty of 1890, Germany took control of Mafia and constructed the buildings still evident on Chole. Germany paid Sultan Sayyid Ali bin Said al-Said of Zanzibar M4 million for both the island and part of the mainland coast. On January 12, 1915, Mafia was taken by British troops as a base for the air and sea assault on the light cruiser Königsberg.The name "Mafia" derives from the Arabic morfiyeh, meaning "group" or "archipelago", or from the Swahili mahali pa afya, meaning "a healthy dwelling-place".

In 1995, Mafia Island had financial help from the World Wide Fund for Nature to make a natural marine wildlife centre which led to establishment of the first Marine Park in Tanzania. The organisation continued to provide support to the Island under Rufiji-Mafia-Kilwa (RUMAKI) seascape project to improve socio-economic well-being of the communities through the sustainable, participatory and equitable utilization and protection of their natural resources. Under the current EU-WWF Fisheries Co-management Project, the organization aims at building effective long-term fisheries co-management through establishment of 10 Beach Management Units and to continue supporting Village Community Banks (VICOBA) in the Island to generate optimal, sustainable and equitable livelihood benefits, and which provide a source of lesson-learning for other coastal communities. The WWF Mafia office is under three technical personnel: Paul Kugopya (Mafia Fisheries Co-management Officer), Marko Gideon (EU-WWF Fisheries Co-management Project Communication/Awareness Officer) and Renatus Rwamugira (Project Accountant for Mafia).

Tanzania's first multi-user marine park at Mafia Island was established in 1995, following management recommendations and data from surveys conducted by the Society for Environmental Exploration. In August 2016, a diver, Alan Sutton, from Seaunseen, who had originally been looking for the remains of an old fort rumoured to have been washed away to sea, instead came across the remains of a wall stretching almost 4 km off Mafia Island. The discovery was detailed in a blog post by Sutton, with images showing remnants of the wall.

== Transport ==
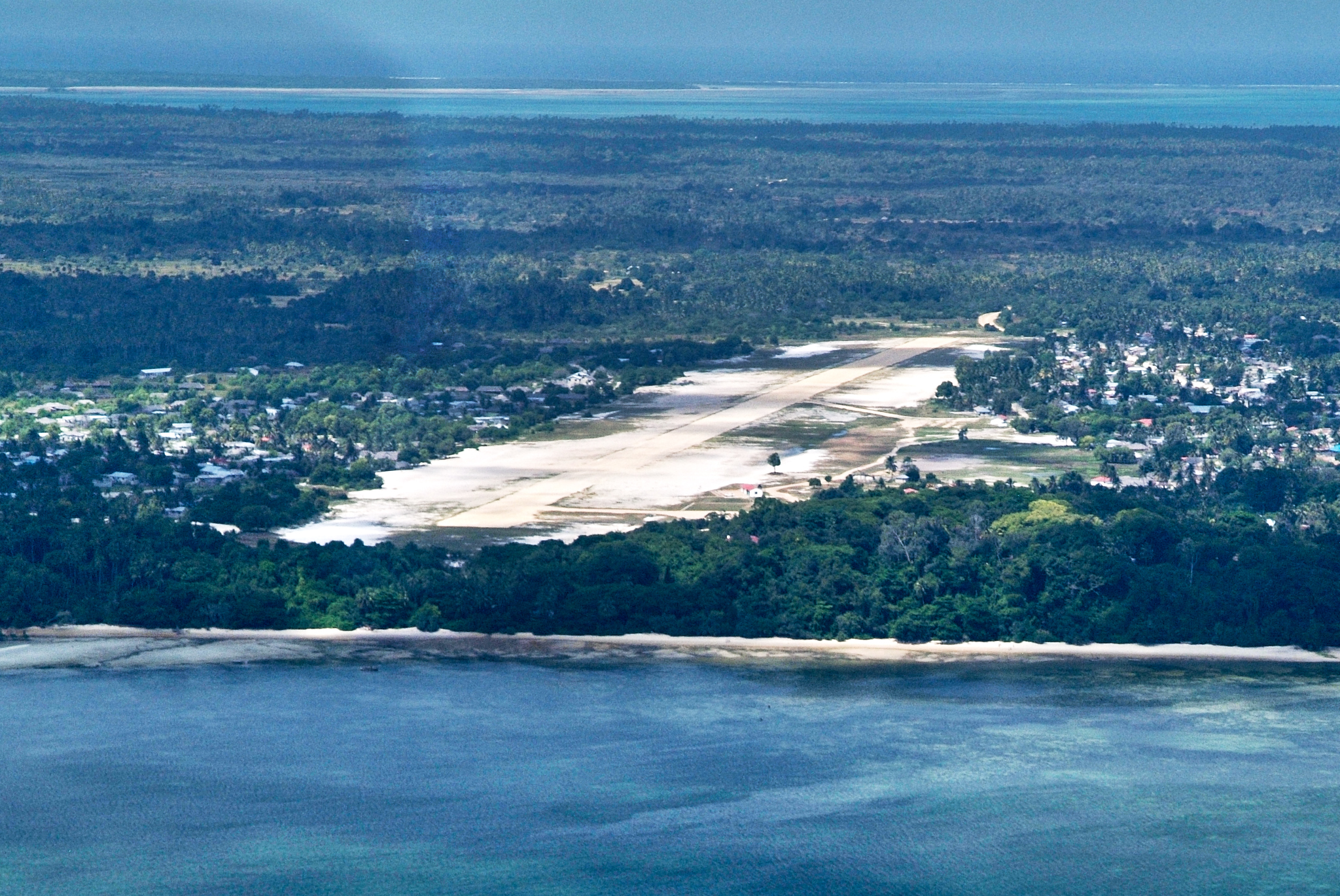
An aerial view of Mafia Island airport.

=== Airport ===
The island's Mafia Airport can be reached from Dar es Salaam by flights operated by Auric Air Tropical Air and Coastal Aviation.

=== Port of Mafia Island ===
Boats depart depending on the presence of the boat from the village of Nyamisati on the mainland to Kilindoni on Mafia island. As of 2021, the departure from Nyamisati is 16:00 p.m. with a roll call between 15:00-16:00 p.m. The journey takes approximately 4.5 hours. Tickets are purchased beforehand in Nyamisati at a cost of 16,000 Tsh one way.

== See also ==
- Geography of Tanzania
- Mafia Island Marine Park

== Gallery ==
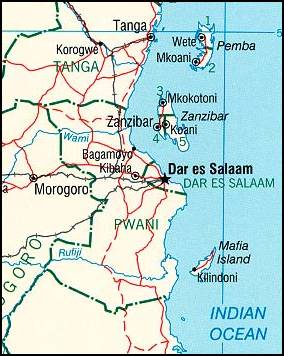
A map of Tanzania showing Mafia Island

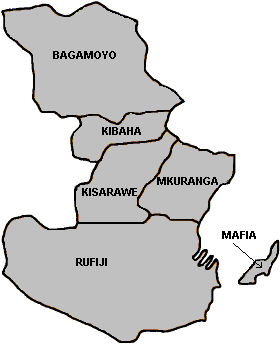
Districts of Pwani Region showing Mafia District

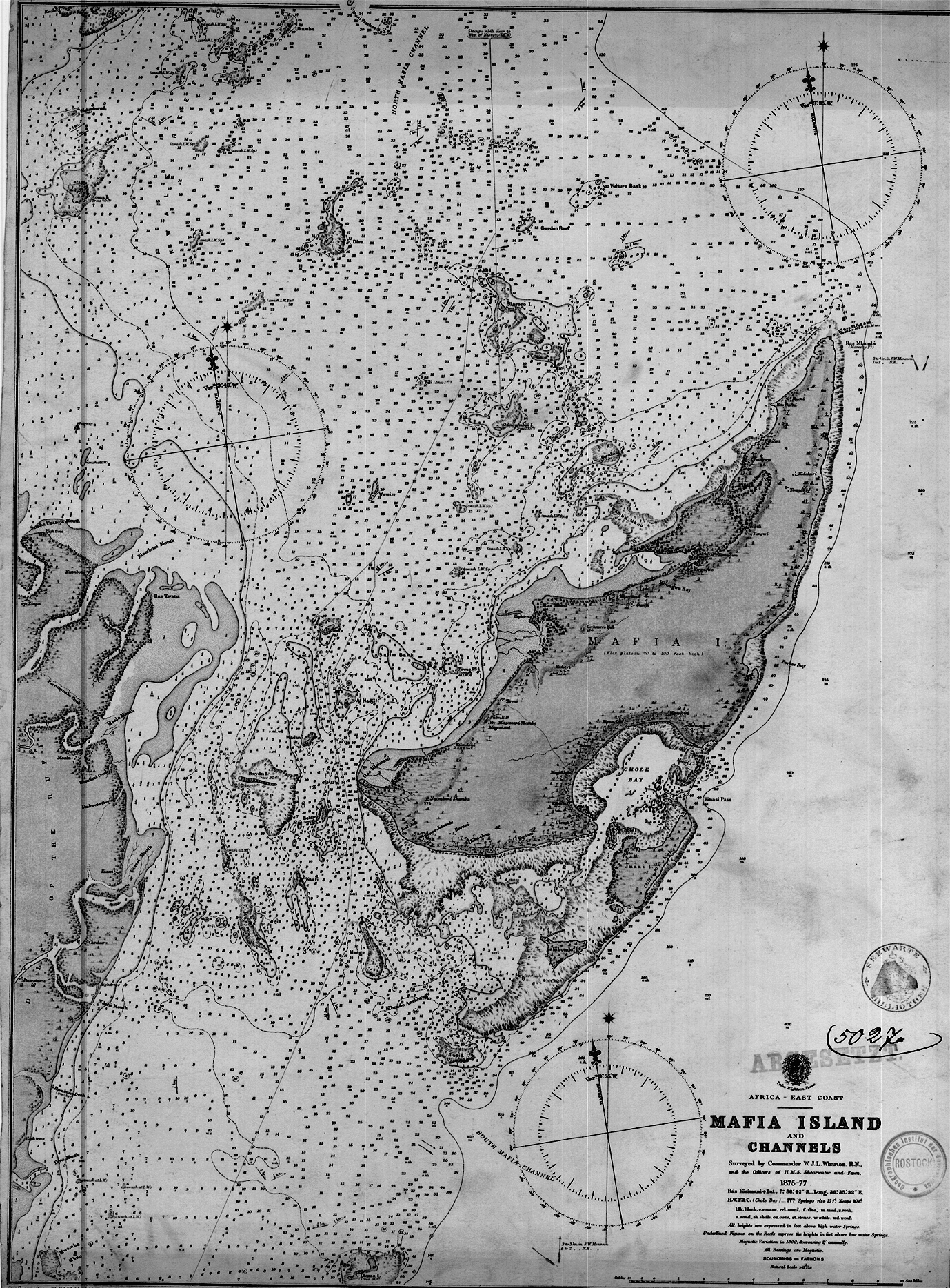
Historical nautical chart

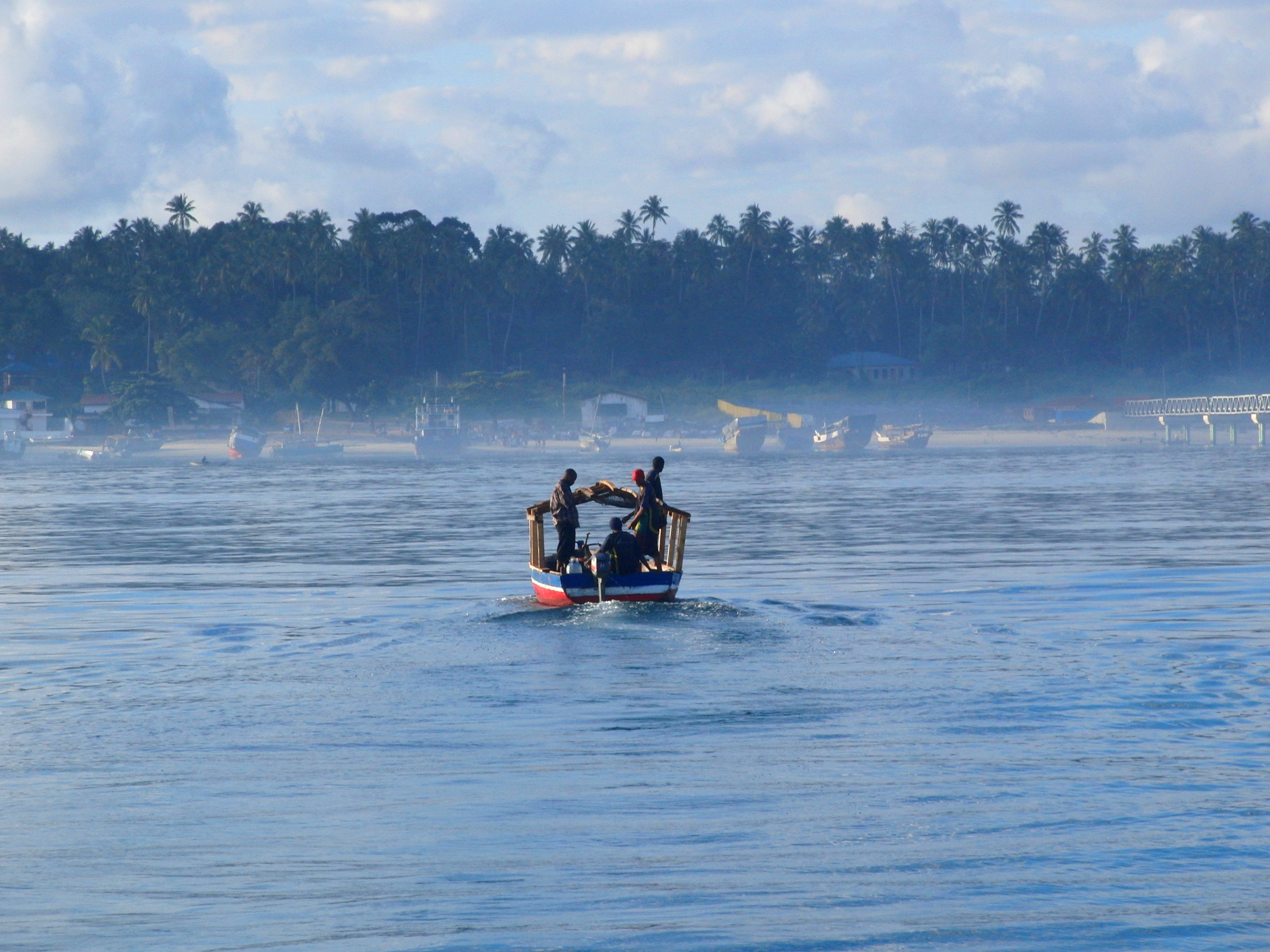
Harbour of Mafia Island as seen from a departing boat

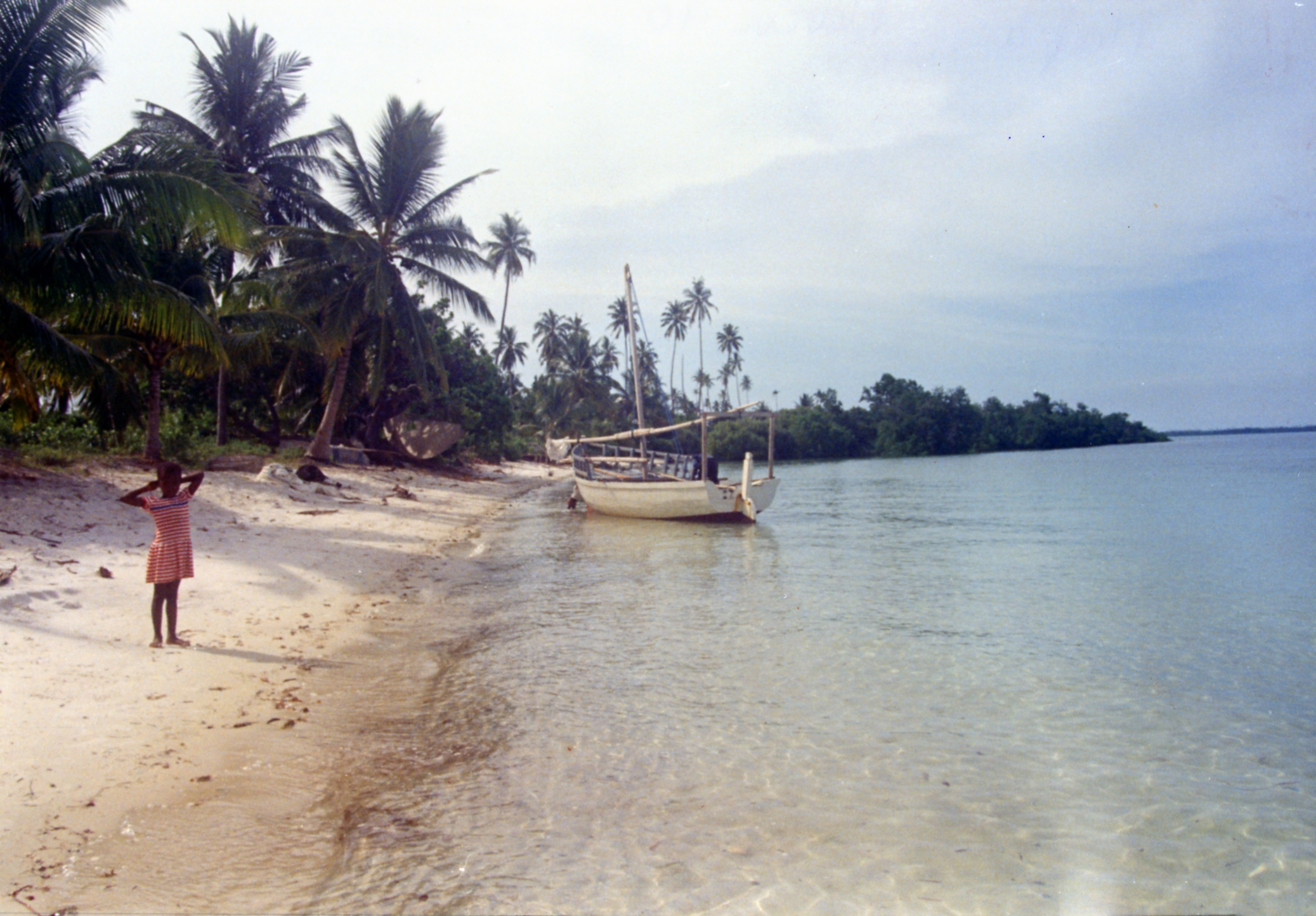
Beach on Mafia Island

== Sources ==
- Mafia District Homepage for the 2002 Tanzania National Census
