= Kua Ruins =

National Historic Site of Tanzania

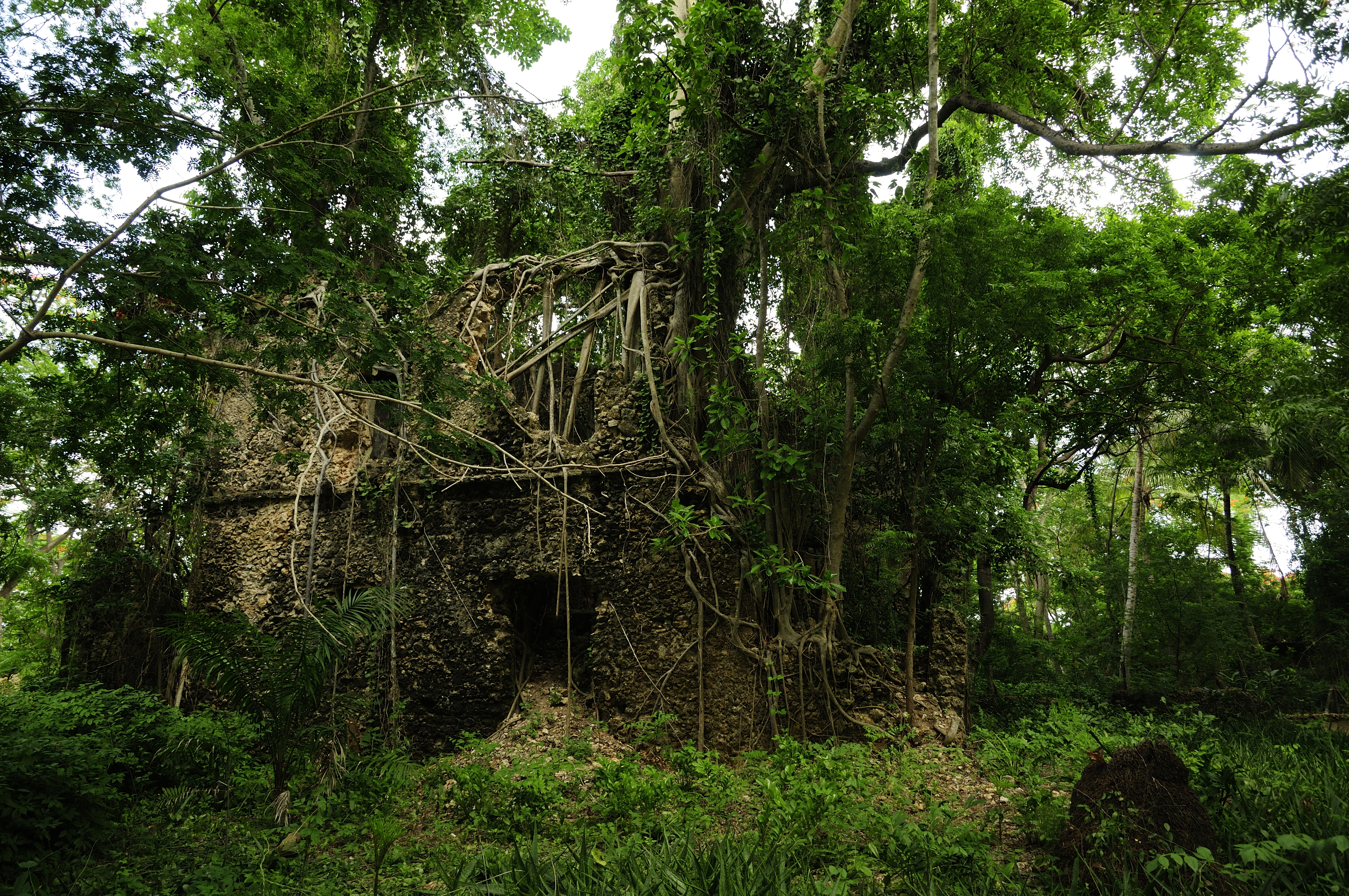
- Ruins of Kua in Juani Island, Mafia District

- Location within Tanzania
- 8°0′10.4″S 39°45′43.2″E
- Type: Settlement
- Cultures: Swahili
- Location: Jibondo ward, Mafia District, Pwani Region, Tanzania

History
- Built: 16th century CE
- Abandoned: 19th century CE

Site notes
- Material: Coral rag
- Architectural styles: Swahili and Islamic
- Excavation dates: 2010
- Archaeologists: Annalisa C. Christie
- Condition: Endangered
- Owner: Tanzanian Government
- Management: Antiquities Division under the Ministry of Natural Resources and Tourism

National Historic Sites of Tanzania
- Official name: Kua Ruins Historic Site
- Type: Cultural

Kua or Ruins of Kua (Swahili: Magofu ya mji wa kale wa Kua) is a Medieval Swahili, National Historic Site located in Jibondo ward of Mafia District in Pwani Region of Tanzania. The site is located on Juani Island of the Mafia Archipelago. As of 2016, the site is currently on the list of 50 at-risk cultural heritage sites in 36 countries.

== Overview ==
Kua is located on Juani Island's southwest shore in Tanzania's Mafia Archipelago. The main settlement appears to have been occupied in the early sixteenth century and abandoned in the early nineteenth century, however there is evidence of the older occupation to the south of the site. There hasn't been any systematic archaeological investigation of the site's standing remains and the material culture that surrounds them. Regarding the quality of the demolished buildings from an architectural standpoint, there are differing viewpoints.

Kua, according to European historians and archaeologists is known as the "Pompeii of East Africa," is a vast complex of coral-stone buildings that may have been encircled by a web of smaller settlements akin to those seen around other stone town sites along the Swahili coast. Recent site surveys reveal that the settlement, which once covered over 30–40 acres, included seven mosques, four cemetery areas, a sizable double-story "palace," at least 10 "complex structures" (likely homes with multiple distinct spaces/rooms), about 30 "walled courts," which may have been connected to homes made of non-stone materials, and a large number of internal and external latrines. Numerous historical records mention the site's significant overgrowth as an issue, and it appears that this has affected how much of the site has been examined and recorded in the past.

According to the "Kua Chronicle," a history of Kua written by Freeman-Grenville in 1955, Shirazi people "who had come long ago from Persia" established the location. Although the exact date of the founding of Kua is uncertain, it is depicted on the maps of Arab geographer Al-Idrisi in 1154 as Kahua. The ancient settlement was focused in an area south of the main ruin complex, known as Mkokotoni. The Mkokotoni site may have been inhabited from at least the 13th century AD, according to numismatic evidence from the area, and Freeman-Grenville cites the potential existence of celadon pottery from the 14th century AD.

Many historians (Freeman-Grenville 1962; Kirkman 1964; Piggott 1941a, 1941b; Revington 1936) have cited an account of the collapse and subsequent abandonment of the site derived from local traditions, even though dates for the foundation of Kua still need to be firmly established through additional archaeological reconnaissance. According to a common myth, the Sakalava from Madagascar stormed Kua in the early 19th century A.D. and "arrived in their small canoes called 'laka' and captured many people." It's believed that this raid was planned by a Kua craftsman who, after becoming dissatisfied with how slaves and other people were treated by their overlords, escaped and brought reinforcements back.

The raid may be more precisely pinpointed to sometime between "1810 and 1835" because the Sultan of Zanzibar, whose authority over the Mafia Archipelago was well-established by 1812, was informed of the attack. This led to "an expedition being formed and sent to pursue the invaders... [who]... were found on a small island and defeated, the prisoners brought triumphantly back to Mafia." It is also likely that the raid took place before 1838, the year in which the Sultan is believed to have "made a treaty with Queen Seneekoo of the Sakalava," given the alleged reaction to the raid. Kua was abandoned after the Sultan's capital was moved to adjacent Chole Island because, despite this triumph, legend has it that Kua never fully recovered from the attack.

Chole was heavily involved in long-distance commerce networks during this time, and it was crucial to the supply of cowrie shells to other parts of Africa. Although Kua participated in long-distance trading networks, as shown by the substantial amounts of imported goods, including as ceramics and beads, Piggott hypothesised that the "population [could not] have depended on sea trade" due to the harbor's characteristics. Uncertainty exists on whether this comment applies to local networks and maritime exploitation as well as long-distance trade; yet, fishing was probably a significant component of the local population's sustenance economy.

Freeman-Grenville claimed that the domestic architecture at the location achieved a not insignificant level of elegance since "many of the houses have elaborate plasterwork, both at the doorways and in the decoration of cupboards and niches." Chittick's assessment that "most of the buildings at Kua are uninspiring" is less flattering.

== Site ==
In 2010, as part of the initiative to evaluate the sociocultural settings of maritime contacts in the archipelago, the structures at Kua were plotted, photographed, and recorded. The Kua settlement site is overgrown, which lessens the visibility of the archaeology. Due to the poor visibility, conflicting information about the settlement's size has been reported. The northernmost portion of the site contains the majority of the constructions that have been recorded. This area, which spans more than 12 acres, is home to a vast complex of coral-stone buildings that include the following: Thirty-one sizable coral-stone enclosures known as "surrounding walls," six mosques, and thirteen intricate complexes with a network of open rooms, corridors, and courts were also discovered.

These buildings are about 250 and 500 meters inland from the shore and run almost parallel to it. Additionally, there are at least four cemeteries in this area, each of which has a large number of built graves, head and foot monuments, and two pillar tombs. At least five circular mounds of coral rocks and debris can be found in the southernmost section of the village, which is known as Mkokotoni (literally, "at the mangroves" in Swahili). One of these mounds was excavated, and the ruins of collapsed dwellings were found there in the form of standing plastered masonry, structural wreckage, foreign and domestic pottery, and remains of local wildlife.

A tiny mosque's ruins as well as a cemetery's remains at the site, which were identified by graves and head- and foot-markers, were noted. While the exact date of the settlement's founding is unknown, Kahua is depicted on the maps created in 1154 by Arab cartographer and geographer Muhammad Al-Idrisi. The Kua Chronicle's historical accounts (written in the 19th Century) indicate that the southern part of the settlement may have been inhabited before the northern part. According to Freeman-Grenville, "Arabs" approached the residents of Mkokotoni and asked them if they needed a spot to develop. They "were given the north part (Mkokotoni)... After they had finished building their town, they called their hosts... and said to them: 'The name of our town will now be called Kua'" The interpretation that Swahili landmarks and culture were the results of alien development is where this allusion to Arabs comes from.

The Mkokotoni area is thought to have existed before the main ruins complex at Kua, according to archaeological evidence. At a 95% confidence level, radiocarbon dates from previous deposits found during excavations in the Mkokotoni area point to a dating range between roughly 1325 and 1346 AD, 1393 and 1437 AD. On the other hand, radiocarbon dates that were improved utilizing archaeological, architectural, and historical information fall within the range of 1619-1699 AD with a 95% confidence level from the excavations within the ruins complex.

== Archaeology ==
=== Materials used in Kua ===
The constructions that have been preserved were mostly constructed from coral rags quarried locally, with sporadic additions of Porites solida (coral harvested directly from the sea's living reefs) and non-coral quartz-like stones. While these materials typically aren't finished, dressed slabs of Porites coral have been seen around (and occasionally inside) the mihrabs (prayer niches) as well as the entryway. Non-coral rag materials are present in 18 of the 43 non-mosque structures that have been identified, with the complex structures having the highest concentrations. Nine of the buildings all include quartz-like stone inclusions in addition to pórite coral. There were dressed coral blocks surrounding seven of the nine constructions' doors and niches.

Many of the walls at Kua display signs of layered construction, a method adapted from Middle Eastern mud-brick building construction in which the stones are polished off to a smooth horizontal surface before the next course of masonry was installed. As for timber, there are some examples of both square and circular impressions where timber would have been used to support ceilings, niches, windows, and doors, even though none of the wood used to create the buildings at Kua has remained.

16 of the structures were discovered to have these wooden accents, with mosques accounting for the remaining four and complex buildings for the other 12. It's likely that the mangrove wood used to create Kua's structures was also used to build Shanga and other nearby stone-town locations on the Swahili coast. Several of the buildings include plug holes, which Horton describes as "rows of roughly circular holes up to 200mm in diameter on either the inside or the outside of the buildings," which is proof that timber scaffolding was employed in their construction.

To create a smooth surface over the uncut coral rag, a lime-and-sand plaster mixture was applied over a matrix of smaller rocks, pottery shards, and shells. Buildings were plastered to varying degrees; in some cases, they were totally coated on the inside, outside, or both; in other cases, the outside was plastered with bands. Of the 43 non-mosque structures, at least 27 have plaster on their walls. Of these 27 buildings, 18 have all of their plastering in place—10 on the inside, 3 on the outside, and 5 on both sides. Nine out of the 43 non-mosque constructions have intricate structures with banded plaster, making up 72% of them.

Bands can be seen at the top or just below the external walls of the structures, and it's probable that more of them had plastering similar to this that was hidden by structural failure or collapse. Only K030 is a complicated construction out of the nine buildings with banded plaster, and the banded plastering only surrounds the house structure.

=== Interiors of Kua ===
There are three different types of embellishment or decorating on the buildings at Kua: niches, signs of potential wall hangings, and incised plastering. Wealthy occupants may have been able to showcase prestige artifacts like imported porcelain pottery in niches found in Swahili constructions. For instance, according to Garlake, a poem written by Carly in the nineteenth century mentions a time in Pate when "the porcelain stood in wall niches." Although it's possible that the niches were useful, especially the ones in doorframes where lamps could be installed, Allen points out that doing so would not have been effective because "the efficacy of a lamp... would be greatly reduced." According to Horton, the design of doorframe niches "developed along the coast during the (sixteenth) century," supporting the idea that the location was occupied during the sixteenth and eighteenth centuries.

Of the 43 non-mosque structures, 13 have known niches; 11 of the 13 are intricate structures. These buildings also contained the most niches, mostly in the rooms; for instance, over 10 niches were counted in each of them. In total, nine The second example's niches resemble the Donley-Reid-described decorative wall niches (zidaka in Swahili). The examination of the internal layout of suggests that the niches in this construction were located inside a public space even though such features are supposed to have been associated with the majority of interior spaces of the Swahili house and would have been used to display prestige goods and lamps.

Over the past 50 years, there has been significant deterioration of the niches at Kua. For instance, the images discovered in the Wheeler Archive in London depict them as being entirely whole and likely made of dressed Porites coral stone. However, because the dressed coral was taken out, only their outlines are still present. While the presence of more niches in one area of the site and the concentration of niches in another portion of the site may imply that these structures date from a later time period, it is also possible that they are later expansions to older structures.

Affixed to walls It's possible that several of the intricate constructions would have featured wall hangings as a type of adornment in addition to the niches. Rows of holes in certain homes, were likely drilled for the purpose of inserting wooden pegs to "hang carpets on the walls." Other Swahili stone-town locations, like as Shanga, Gede, Kilwa, and Songo Mnara, have comparable peg holes. Plaster with Incisions In seven of the 43 non-mosque constructions, intricate carved plastering that encircles doors or niches was visible.

=== Walls of Kua ===
Many of the ruins at Kua are enclosed walls, in contrast to other stone-town sites in the area including Shanga, Songo Mnara, and Gede which contain a higher number of intricate constructions and mosques. These depict significant tracts of land that are enclosed by four stone walls that are on average 0.4 meters thick. The top of the wall is frequently externally beveled in areas where the whole height of the surrounding walls is visible. The majority of the enclosed wall constructions lack any discernible standing coral-stone architecture, with the exception of a small number of structures that housed nicely completed, compact ablution facilities.

These enclosed walls have an average area of 275.2 m2. It seems improbable that every one of the enclosed walls at Kua would have been a home in its own right, given that the average size of the residential structures at Shanga was 129.5 m, and less than 5% of the structures covered an area of more than 200 m. The various compounds had distinct functions as a result of the changes in their sizes and the features they contain isolated latrines, and built ablutions facilities.

According to post holes discovered during the excavations at Shanga, some of the compounds—likely those without an associated latrine—likely contained other structures made of archaeologically ephemeral materials, such as wattle-and-daub houses and timber kiosks. These structures suggest that at least some of the compounds—likely those without an associated latrine—might have been used as pens. Storage was a different choice, especially for tiny wall enclosures.

=== Doorways of Kua ===
For 25 of the structures that were surveyed, entry points were noted. Only six of these had multiple entrances; three of these were mosques, while the rest were intricate structures. Nine entrances were located there, with the south and east being the most popular access sites. These are closely followed by eight entry sites from the south. Northern entryways were included in four buildings. These entrances were frequently well-plastered, had beveled edges, and were frequently connected to restrooms in a number of ways.

=== Ablution Facilities and toilets at Kua ===
Over 50% of the buildings in the main Kua complex still have some structural evidence of restrooms and other ablution facilities. Some were solitary pit latrines. Some of these were latrine pits in small, enclosed areas connected to bathrooms with plastered walls and niches. The majority of the separate pit latrines were enclosed by the high walls. The wall compounds, whose latrine pits are linked to other architectural elements, are the principal exceptions to this rule.

The washrooms and toilets in two areas in the site were built with low walls that abutted the enclosed walls next to the main entry point. The ease of access to the facilities upon arrival can be one way to read this from a functional standpoint, but it can also be seen from a sociocultural perspective as a way to obtain cleanliness before entering the main complex area.

Regarding attention to cleanliness and practicality in the architectural layout, the restroom and ablution facilities in Kua are consistent with the evidence in other Swahili-speaking regions. The incorporation of water management technology into Swahili urban settings was partly a response to a concern for ceremonial purity and actual clan boundaries, as revealed by contemporary ethnographies.

=== Mosques of Kua ===
During the 2010 study, all seven of the mosques that Freeman-Grenville had noticed in the middle of the 1950s were once again identified and noted. All except one of them could be distinguished by the presence of a mihrab, a semicircular recess in a mosque's wall. The Mkokotoni settlement is home to the mosque that the 2010 study were unable to locate. Although its mihrab is now gone, it is in living memory. The chronology of Kua may be understood in large part thanks to mosques. According to Garlake, "the mosque mihrab shows a clear and unbroken development of style and technique (from the earliest surviving mihrabs to those of the eighteenth century") is undoubtedly the most sensitive sign of change and progress in style.

Garlake's interpretation is the only thorough architectural analysis of the mosque mihrâbs at Kua to date, hence it is widely relied upon when describing these buildings. The earliest mosque, with its "arcaded apse" design, is believed to have existed in the fourteenth or fifteenth centuries. This design is comparable to but distinct from the inner trifoliate-arch style of Songo Mara's main mosque, now known as the northeast mosque. Garlake assigned the northeast mosque a post-sixteenth-century dating, but it is contended that this is probably too late because there is no proof the location was occupied at that time.

The mihrab that is still standing at the location seems to be a simplified version of a classic design that is supposed to have been popularized in the late sixteenth to early seventeenth century, at least on the northern Swahili coast. Outside of Kenya, according to Garlake, this design most likely dated to the middle of the seventeenth century. The mihrab at the mosque has a streamlined version of a classic style. It is described as a plaster clam shell and raised band, but it has a more intricate fluted apse. The construction or potential remodeling of the mosque to include a minbar (pulpit) recess in the north wall, which Garlake believes is a feature of the late eighteenth-century congregational mosques, would seem to have been the culmination of this period of development.The existence of the minbar appears to be at odds with the mihrab's potentially trifoliate arch design from the sixteenth century and the most probable display of imported porcelain ceramics above it. Three depressions that are supposed to be areas for the insertion of such imports are used to denote the latter.

The architectural aspects of mosque designs are crucial. There is typically a wall niche, called a mihrab, in a mosque showing the direction, or qiblah, because Muslims must face the Kaaba (in Mecca), the most sacred site in Islam, during prayer. It appears that the alignment of the mihrab changed from a more northwesterly orientation to a northeasterly direction, despite the fact that the chronology of the mosques at Kua is not as precise as one would want. This change resembles what Horton saw as the Friday Mosque in Shanga's qiblah line shifted position over time as it underwent several phases of reconstruction. The "growing knowledge of global topography as well as astronomical knowledge of direction finding" is what he credits for these changes.

Mosques served as identity markers as well, and the spatiality of social interactions was greatly influenced by where they were situated in relation to the surrounding environment. For instance, there is only one mosque that is currently visible on the approach to the harbor at Kua, which is situated on a little elevation in the surrounding landscape. Arriving at the location, there are no other buildings visible, despite the fact that some other buildings nearby face out over the water. The mosques' prominence and closeness to the coast provided opportunities to create and support "religious communities" in a vibrant, international economic environment.

Although there are no textual sources or archaeological evidence that show how Swahili merchants used Islamic rules of business and exchange, these rules undoubtedly influenced how market exchanges were conducted in coastal towns. This suggests that adherence to Islamic practice may have shaped the Swahili marketplace. Beginning in the eleventh century, an increasing social interaction with the sea had an impact on Swahili's social identity and contributed to build a developing cosmopolitanism.

mosques' placement has changed with time, moving from a more central site in earlier periods to one that is more visible from the sea in later centuries. They suggest that this may have been a tactic used by the locals to communicate to their largely Muslim guests that they were an "Islamic settlement with a common code of practices."

Furthermore, despite the fact that these settlements had long-standing Muslim populations prior to the change, it has been argued that the relocation of these mosques reflects a "shift toward maritime," in which the Swahili communities saw their identities as being closely connected to the sea and extending across the Sea of Zanj to the Middle East. This concept is founded on the idea that traders would prefer to do business with people who share their values, and as a result, the Islamicization of the East African coast made it easier to establish stronger ties with the networks in the Indian Ocean.

While Horton acknowledges that the multiple phases of mosque construction at Shanga may have been driven by the necessity to accommodate the expanding population and the increasing size of the settlement, it may also indicate the "Islamicization of the community more broadly." He points out that both the local Bantu community and traveling merchants would have used these mosques. During excavations at Ras Mkumbuu on Pemba, which represents a sequence from the seventh to the eleventh century, a similar sequence of building, demonstrating a transition from timber-and-daub to coral-stone construction, variation in orientation, and increased space capacity, was also seen. For each of these phases of the mosque, a fictitious space capacity was calculated.

Construction was done according to mosque size, with attendance arranged in rows according to length and individuals per row according to breadth. It was calculated that the praying capacity at Shanga increased from 10 people in the earliest phase (about the ninth century) to 80 people in the eleventh century using this meter, which represents 1 m per person. Over the same time span, Ras Mkumbuu's capacity expanded from around 50 to 160 worshipers. The mosques in Kua also underwent a similar type of investigation. According to the statistics, there are three main clusters depending on the mosque's capacity: between 50 and 75 persons. These clusters of ability might be connected to temporal variations.

=== Cemeteries at Kua ===
The majority of Kua's mosques are encircled by modest cemeteries. Each cemetery has between 10 and 40 built graves, some of which have stepped and sloped construction designs, as well as a number of smaller graves that are just marked by headstones and footstones. These monuments go well beyond the confines of the constructed tombs. Interestingly, a number of the head and foot stones were located inside the mosques' walls, which may indicate that the defunct mosque was turned into a cemetery. Over 30 stepped or inclined tombs as well as several head and foot stones may be found at Kua's largest cemetery.

The burials, which are placed closely together, are believed to date from the seventeenth and eighteenth centuries. Most are between 2.5 and 3 meters long, although one was much shorter and contained a child's remains. An Arabic term for a noble or chieftain, one of the graves connected to the beach mosque is said to have belonged to a local Sharif. This monument is frequently visited by inhabitants of the neighborhood and is situated somewhat off-center from the other tombs there. The 245° 65° (southwest-northeast) axis runs parallel to the location of the Sharif's burial. Around the cemetery, there are a number of larger structures housing several interments.

These frequently have decorative details like niches and are well-built and plastered. During the surveys, there were found to be two pillar tombs. Pillar graves are frequently thought of as symbols of important people. The construction of several of these tombs in the surrounding area is credited to holy men (such as the Takwa pillar tomb).

At Kua, it would seem that the pillar tomb was connected to family memory, tracing ancestry, and influencing power negotiations at the communal level. The tomb was the focal point of the cemetery and would be highly noticeable. It's interesting that a complete red-slip vessel, which may have been used in rituals of ancestor remembrance reported at Songo Mara, was discovered inside the tomb enclosure.

Because the pillar tomb is not connected to a built mosque and is situated in a rather open area between the majority of coralstone buildings and the sea, the second pillar tomb at Kua is mysterious. On the site, there are only two inscribed tombs visible. The name of the first is etched on a headstone that is partially ruined and bears the inscription: "Sharif Biwilad Mohammed Ahmed bin Hamri Swaghir Alkemall." The grave is still undated since the remaining writing cannot be read. The date IIVO-1175 Hijri, or AD 1761, is written on the other inscription, which was discovered on a gravestone connected to a mosque.

The mosques date from the sixteenth to the eighteenth centuries, or over 200 years, based on their architectural characteristics. A mosque that is currently sinking into the sea is one of two mosques that are located right on the coast. Both of these mosques may have once been visible from the sea and may have served as fishermen's mosques, despite the fact that mangroves now encircle the location. These two mosques were built at the same time, yet despite their close proximity, there is a noticeable difference in the quality of their finishes. They probably catered to both merchants and fishermen. In contrast, two more inland mosques that are south of the majority of the Kua ruins and are notably linked to architectural styles from a little earlier time (16th to 17th century) are located.

Given the chronologies, the scale of the adjacent cemetery, and the existence of a pillar tomb frequently associated with persons of authority, it seems likely that this mosque was built contemporaneously with many of the other nearby buildings. The construction of the seaside mosque in the eighteenth century may have complemented it, and ultimately, it's possible that it eventually stole its place. It most likely became the Friday mosque because of its larger size and intricate style. Despite not being near the ocean, the mosque was the only building that could be seen from the water due to its location on a high topography.

== See also ==
- Historic Swahili Settlements
- Kaole
- Chole Island Ruins
- Kunduchi Ruins
- Msuka Mjini Ruins
- Kichokochwe Ruins
- Pujini Ruins
- Kimbiji Ruins
- Mbutu Bandarini
- Mbuamaji
