= Juani Island =

Island of the Mafia Archipelago in Pwani Region, Tanzania

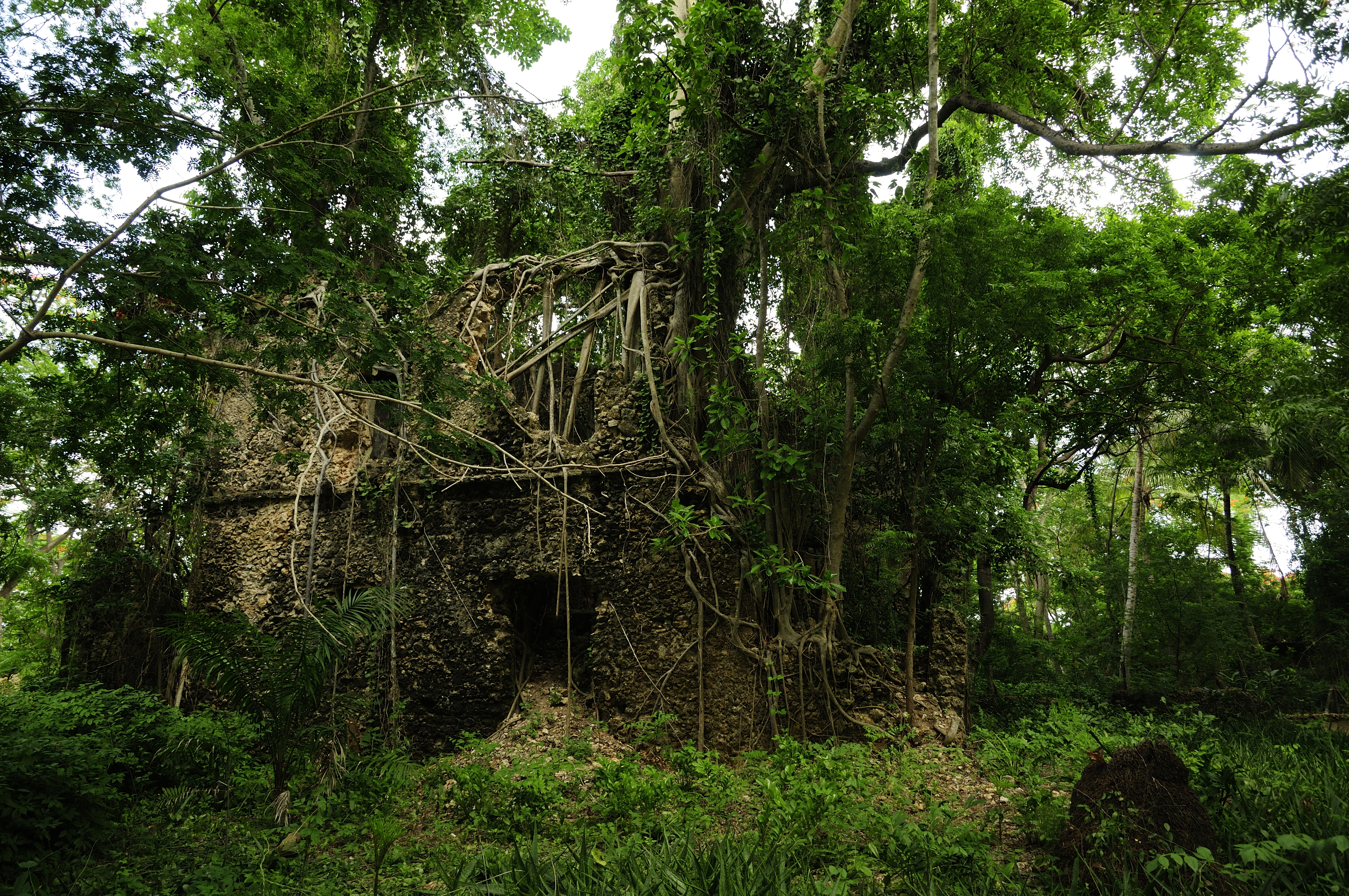
- Kua Ruins of Juani Island

- Location on the Mafia Archipelago

Geography
- Location: Sea of Zanj
- Coordinates: 8°0′8.64″S 39°46′50.52″E
- Archipelago: The Mafia Archipelago
- Length: 8.9 km (5.53 mi)
- Width: 3.9 km (2.42 mi)

Administration
- Tanzania
- Region: Pwani Region
- District: Mafia District
- Ward: Jibondo

Demographics
- Languages: Swahili
- Ethnic groups: Matumbi, Ndengereko & Rufiji

Juani Island (Kisiwa cha Juani, in Swahili) is an island of the Mafia Archipelago located in Jibondo ward of Mafia District in southern Pwani Region of Tanzania.

The Kua Ruins are the only things that are left of a Medieval Swahili settlement on the island, and they are situated on Juani Island southwestern coast. They shed light on a civilisation that existed on an island and was ruled by the Portuguese and the Omani as well as by independence, enslavement, and finally abandonment. The island is part of the Mafia Island Marine Park

The monuments contain evidence of early occupation and trade, including as Islamic and Chinese ceramics from the thirteenth and fourteenth centuries and coins from mainland Tanzania's Kilwa, and Portuguese reports from the sixteenth century mention the Kua people's enormous wealth.
