= Rufiji District =

District of Pwani Region, Tanzania

Coordinates: 7.9575°S 38.7266°E

Rufiji District

Rufiji is one of the six districts of the Pwani Region of Tanzania. It is bordered to the north by the Kisarawe and Mkuranga Districts, to the east by the Indian Ocean, to the south by the Kilwa District, Lindi Region and to the west by the Morogoro Region. The district capital is the town of Utete on the southern banks of the Rufiji River.

The district name comes from the Rufiji River which runs through the district. There are many ethnic groups in Rufiji District. The main ethnic groups that originate from the district are the Matumbi and Rufiji people. In the north is home to the Ndengereko people, who are the largest group of the district, and on the delta are the Nyagatwa People. The Ngindo, Pogoro, and Makonde peoples also inhabit the district. Most of these groups are Muslim, with few Christians, and followers of traditional religions.

According to the 2022 Tanzania National Census, the population of the Rufiji District was 159,906.

== Wards ==
The Rufiji District is administratively divided into 19 wards:

1. Bungu
2. Chumbi
3. Ikwiriri
4. Kibiti
5. Kiongoroni
6. Mahege
7. Maparoni
8. Mbuchi
9. Mbwara
10. Mchukwi
11. Mgomba
12. Mkongo
13. Mtunda
14. Mwaseni
15. Ngorongo
16. Ngarambe
17. Ruaruke
18. Salale
19. Umwe
20. Utete
21. Kilimani
22. Kipugila
23. Ngorongo
