= Ndengereko language =

Language

Ndengereko
- Kindengereko
- Native to: Tanzania
- Region: Pwani
- Ethnicity: Ndengereko
- Native speakers: 72,000 (2013)
- Language family: Niger–Congo?: Atlantic–Congo; Benue–Congo; Bantoid; Bantu; Rufiji–Ruvuma; Matumbi language; Matandu; Ndengereko

Language codes
- ISO 639-3: Either: ndg – Ndengereko rui – Rufiji (duplicate code)
- Glottolog: nden1248
- Guthrie code: P.11, P.12

- Person: Mndengereko
- People: Wandengereko
- Language: Kindengereko
- Country: Pwani

Ndengereko is a Bantu language spoken in central coast of Tanzania mostly in the Pwani Region also known as Warufiji after the local River, the Matumbi hills, near Kibiti, and near Mchukivi and Bungu.
