= Kilindoni =

Capital of Mafia District, Pwani Region

Kilindoni Mji wa Kilindoni
- Town
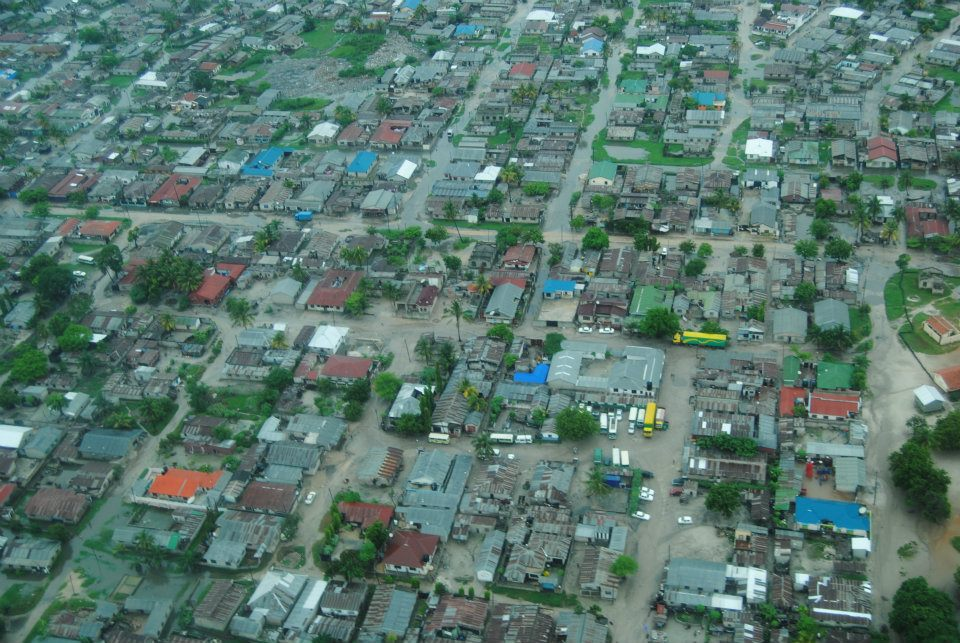
- Aerial view

- Location in Tanzania
- Coordinates: 7°55′0″S 39°39′0″E
- Country: Tanzania
- Region: Pwani Region
- District: Mafia District

Population (2022 census)
  - Total: 23,426
- Time zone: UTC+3 (East Africa Time)

Kilindoni is the capital of Mafia District in Pwani Region, Tanzania. It is the largest settlement on Mafia Island.

== Climate ==
Mafia island has a tropical climate, and this climate is classified as "Aw" by the Köppen-Geiger system. Average temperature in town of Kilindoni is 26.7 °C (80.1 °F). The average annual rainfall is 1,705 mm. The monthly average temperatures are usually between 24.8 and 28.3 °C (76.6 and 82.9 °F). There is one major rain season, with most rainfall coming between March and May. Dry season spans between July and October.

== Economy ==
The economy is based on fishing, subsistence agriculture and the market in Kilindoni. The island attracts some tourists, mainly adventure scuba divers, game fishermen, and people wanting relaxation.

== Airport ==
The island can be reached from Dar es Salaam by flights operated by Auric Air. This is the only airport on the island.

Climate data for Kilindoni
Month	Jan	Feb	Mar	Apr	May	Jun	Jul	Aug	Sep	Oct	Nov	Dec	Year
Average high °C (°F)	31.3 (88.3)	31.6 (88.9)	31.3 (88.3)	29.9 (85.8)	29.3 (84.7)	28.3 (82.9)	27.5 (81.5)	28.2 (82.8)	29.3 (84.7)	30.3 (86.5)	30.6 (87.1)	31.1 (88)	29.9 (85.8)
Daily mean °C (°F)	28.3 (82.9)	28.3 (82.9)	28.1 (82.6)	27.0 (80.6)	26.4 (79.5)	25.4 (77.7)	24.8 (76.6)	25.0 (77)	25.7 (78.3)	26.8 (80.2)	27.2 (81)	27.8 (82)	26.7 (80.1)
Average low °C (°F)	25.3 (77.5)	25.1 (77.2)	25.0 (77)	24.2 (75.6)	23.5 (74.3)	22.6 (72.7)	22.1 (71.8)	21.9 (71.4)	22.2 (72)	23.3 (73.9)	23.9 (75)	24.6 (76.3)	23.6 (74.5)
Average precipitation cm (inches)	13.4 (5.28)	9.8 (3.86)	23.4 (9.21)	48.2 (18.98)	26.0 (10.24)	8.0 (3.15)	4.9 (1.93)	2.5 (0.98)	2.2 (0.87)	3.5 (1.38)	10.2 (4.02)	18.4 (7.24)	170.5 (67.13)
Source: Climate-Data.ORG
