= Mafia Channel =

- Location in Tanzania
- Coordinates: 7°56′48″S 39°30′02″E
- Ocean/sea sources: Indian Ocean
- Basin countries: Tanzania
- Max. width: 18 km (11 mi)
- Islands: Bwejuu Island

The Mafia Channel is a strait in the Pwani Region, Tanzania, Africa.

== Geography ==
The Mafia Channel stretches in a roughly north/south direction between the Rufiji River estuary and Mafia Island. The deltas at the mouth of the Rufiji River extrude towards the island and water is forced through, causing constant erosion of the deltas and the island itself. The small and narrow Bwejuu Island is located in the middle of the channel.
