= Mafia Island Marine Park =

Marine National Park of Pwani Region, Tanzania

- IUCN category VI (protected area with sustainable use of natural resources)
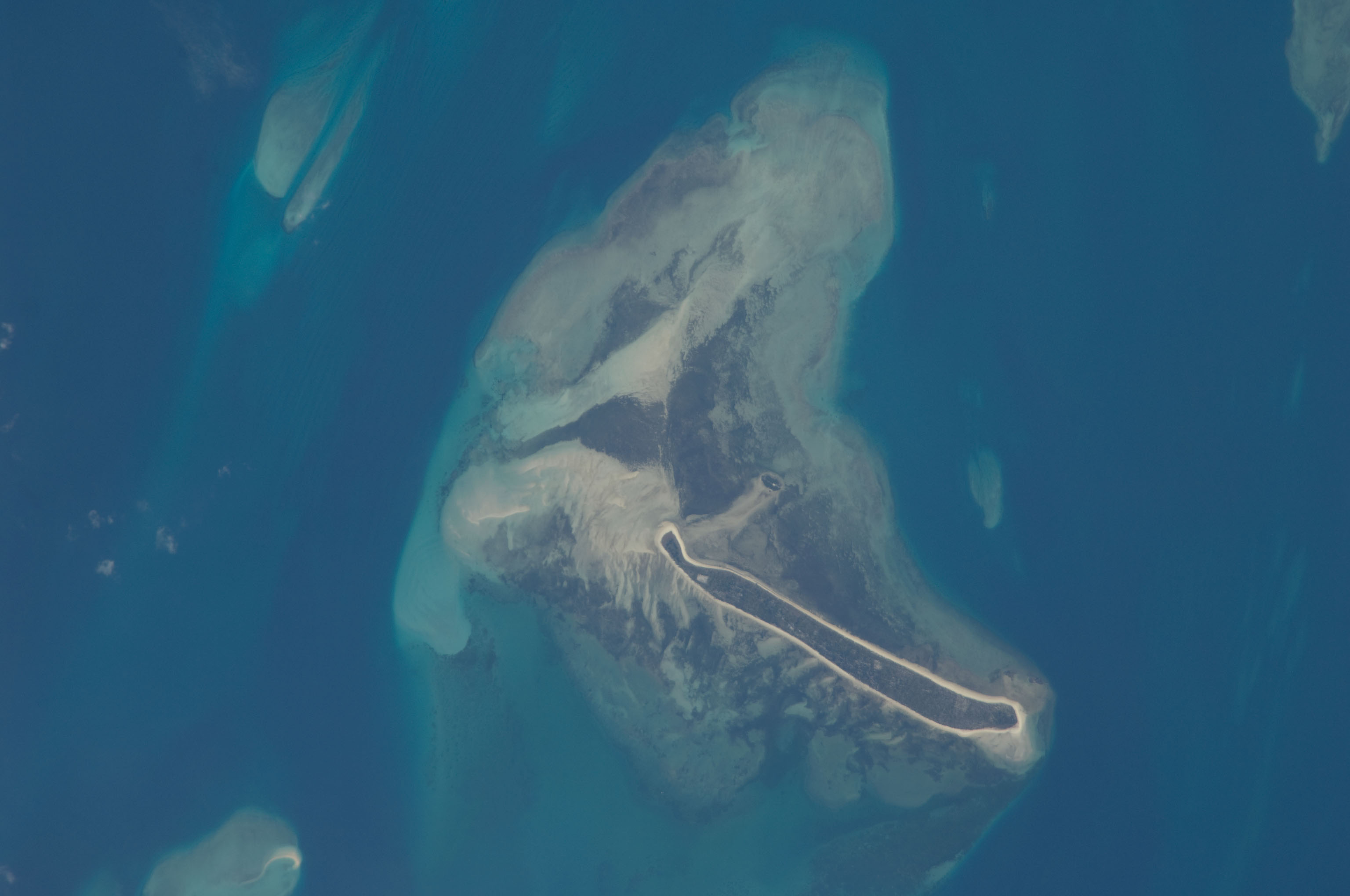
- Bwejuu Island of the Mafia Archipelago's Marine Park

- Location within Tanzania
- Location: Mafia District, Pwani Region
- Nearest city: Kilindoni
- Coordinates: 07°45′07″S 39°54′01″E
- Area: 822 km^{2} (317 sq mi)
- Established: 1995
- Governing body: Marine Parks & Reserves Authority (Tanzania)
- Website: Mafia Island Marine Park

Mafia Island Marine Park (Hifadhi Bahari ya Taifa ya Kisiwa cha Mafia, in Swahili) is a marine park of Tanzania with the IUCN category VI around the Mafia Archipelago in the Indian Ocean's sea of Zanj. It is administratively located in the jurisdiction Mafia District of Pwani Region in Tanzania.

== Impact on marine biodiversity ==
Prior to the establishment of Mafia Island Marine Park, experienced local fishermen unanimously reported a decline in catch trends. According to these fishermen, the decline began in the 1960s and was caused by dynamite fishing, habitat destruction, overfishing and destructive gear. Catch per unit efforts were lowest in the 1980s and 1990s just before the establishment of the park in 1995.

Since the establishment of the park, these same fishermen report that the destructive practice of coral mining has been reduced and is now permitted only for subsistence use. However, a 2003 study revealed a live coral cover of only 14%.

Studies have shown that the biomass of fish species like the blackspot snapper are six to ten times greater within the protected area, and snapper body size also tends to be larger within the protected area. The blackspot snapper has displayed a positive response to the implementation of the marine park, but more research on the response of multiple species to the implementation of the marine park is needed to determine whether or not the park is successfully protecting marine biodiversity.

== Impact on fisheries ==
A 2004 study revealed that fishing sites near the protected area had higher fish abundances and a larger mean fish size than sites further from the protected area. This phenomenon of increased fish abundance inside and around protected areas is called "spillover". Spillover occurs when a fish population has recovered to such high abundances within a protected area that the fish begin to leave the protected area, replenishing the surrounding fish population.

== Impact on local communities ==
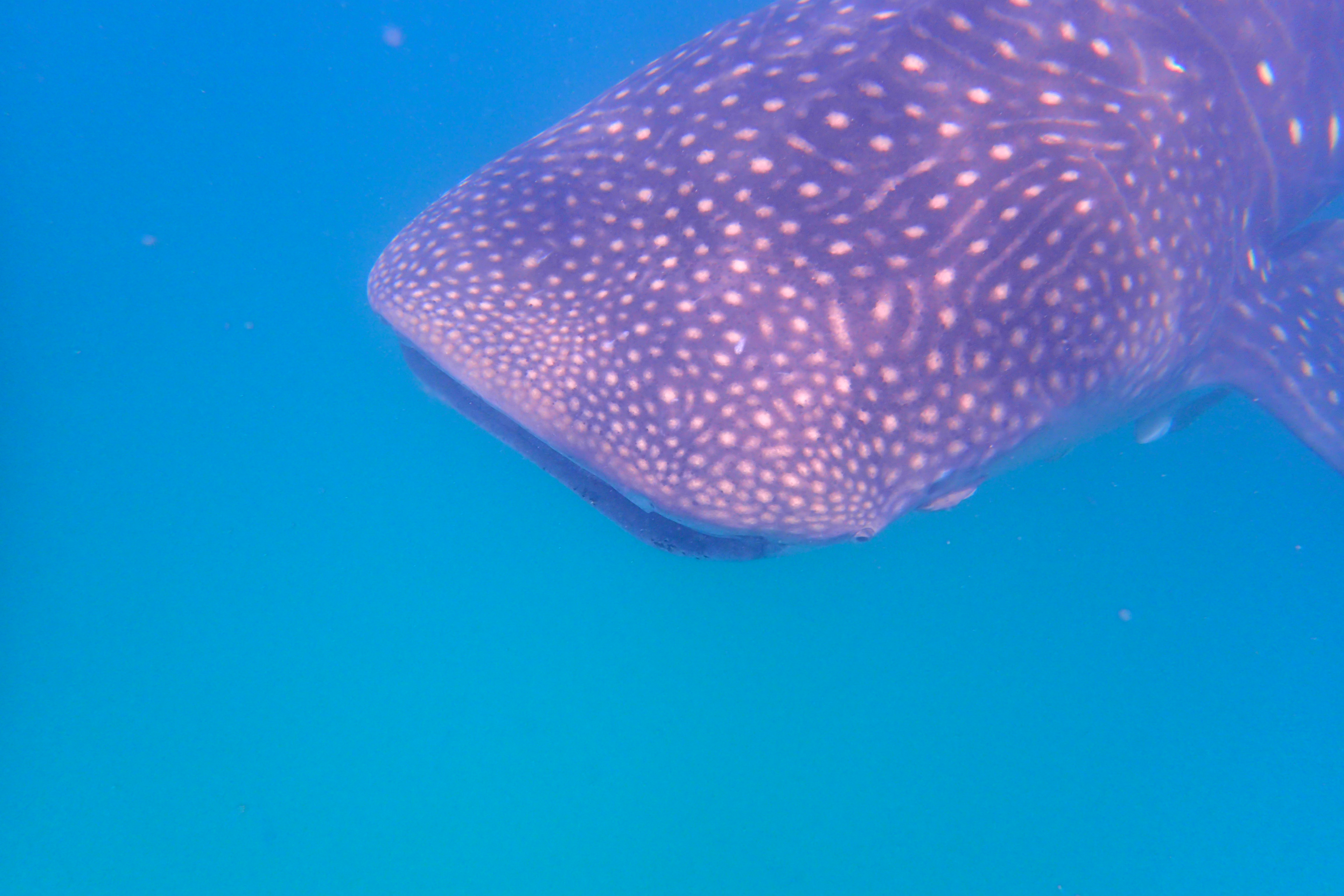
Afro Whale Shark Safari, Mafia Island

According to several studies, local fishermen and villagers suffered a reduced capacity to provide for themselves and their families because of the loss of key fishing grounds following the implementation of the Mafia Island Marine Park. These same studies found that, despite these hardships, park management focused mainly on improving marine environmental conditions rather than addressing human needs. In fact, many studies cite the implementation of MPA's as a cause of vulnerability and uncertainty for local livelihoods.

== Tourist attractions ==
Tourist attractions in Mafia Island Marine Park include snorkeling and diving. Mafia Island is famous for its offshore resident whale shark population.

== See also ==
- List of national parks of Tanzania
- Marine parks of Tanzania
- Marine reserves of Tanzania
- Wildlife of Zanzibar
