= Sea of Zanj =

- بحر زنج (Arabic); Bahari ya Zanj (Swahili)
- Location in the Indian Ocean
- Location: Indian Ocean
- Coordinates: 7°0′S 50°0′E
- Type: Sea
- Basin countries: Zanzibar, Comoros, Madagascar
- Max. length: 2,400 km (1,500 mi)
- Max. width: 1,500 km (930 mi)
- References: The Meadows of Gold

The Sea of Zanj (Arabic: بحر زنج, romanized: Baḥr Zanj; Swahili: Bahari ya Zanj) is a former name for the portion of the western Indian Ocean adjacent to the region in the African Great Lakes referred to by medieval Arab geographers as Zanj. The Sea of Zanj was deemed a fearful zone by Arab mariners and legends regarding dangers in the waters abounded, especially near its far southern limits.

== Etymology ==
The word Zanj eventually comes from Persian zang (زنگ [zæŋ]), meaning "black".

== Geography ==
The term was applied to the sea expanses near eastern sub-Saharan Africa, known by medieval Arab chroniclers such as the Iraqi Al Masudi and the Moroccan Ibn Batuta.

Although geographically insufficiently defined, the area of the Sea of Zanj included a vast maritime region roughly stretching as far as ancient navigators reached on their dhows. Subject to Monsoon wind variations, the Sea of Zanj was located to the south of the Erythraean Sea. It stretched off the coast of Southeast Africa as far south as the Mozambique Channel, including the Comoros and the waters off the eastern coast of Madagascar. On its eastern side the sea extended west of the Seychelles and to the northwest of the islands of the Mascarenes.

== See also ==
- Zanj
- Zanzibar
- Swahili coast
