= Ndengereko people =

Ethnic group from Pwani Region of Tanzania

The Ndengereko are a Bantu ethnic and linguistic group from southern Pwani Region, Tanzania. Their homeland is north of the Rufiji River in parts of Muhoro, Kibiti, Ikwiriri, Utete, etc. In 2000 the Ndengereko population was estimated to number 110,000.

They speak the Ndengereko language. The Ndengereko are Muslim.
