= Rufiji people =

Ethnic group from Rufiji District, Pwani Region, Tanzania

The Rufiji are an ethnic and linguistic group based in the central coast of Tanzania specifically Rufiji District next to the Rufiji River delta in Pwani Region. In 1987 the Rufiji population was estimated to number 200,000 .
