= List of islands of Tanzania =

The following is the list of islands in the territory of Tanzania.

== By geographic zone ==
The regions surrounding Lake Victoria

=== Lake Victoria ===
- Mara Region
  - Rorya District
    - Lukuba Island
  - Bunda District
    - Nafuba Island
    - Augusta Islands (West to east; Bunyasa, Mashwera, Namguma, Ruiga)
- Mwanza Region
  - Ukerewe District
    - Ukerewe Island
    - Ukara Island
    - Bwiru Island
    - Kweru Island
    - Usengere Island
    - Sizu Island
    - Kiregi Island
    - Kunene Islands
    - Namatembe Island
    - Vesi Archipelago
    - Ilangala Island
    - Komasi Island
    - Gana Island
    - Irugwa Island
    - Kulazu Island
    - Leigoba Island
    - Buluza Island
  - Buchosa District
    - Kome Island
    - Ikuru Island
    - Maisome Island
    - Soswa Islands
    - Luwaima Island
    - Miandere Islands
  - Ilemela District
    - Saanane Island
    - Gabalema Island
    - Anchor Island
  - Magu District
    - Ijinga Island
  - Misungwi District
    - Masuha Island
    - Nyamatala Island
  - Sengerema District
    - Juma Island
    - Chitandere Island
    - Chamagati Island
    - Bihiru Island
- Geita Region
  - Geita District
    - Rubondo Island
    - Rubissi Island (west of Rubondo)
    - Mambe Island
    - Butwa Island
- Kagera Region
  - Muleba District
    - Nabuyongo Island
    - Ikuza Islands (Includes Itemusi, Mtoto to the west, Luhuguru, Lukando)
    - Mazinga Island or (Masinga Island)
    - Kivumba Islands (Includes Iramba island to the east)
    - Majeje Island
    - Niankuru Island
    - Majunwa Island
    - Galinsira Island
    - Iramba Island
    - Iroba Island
    - Bumbire Island
    - Kitua Island
    - Njaburu Island
    - Makibwa Islands
    - Kishaka Island
    - Bukerebe Island or (Bukarabe Island)
    - Musira Island
    - Mkuru Kinagi Island

=== Lake Tanganyika ===
- Kigoma Region
  - Karilami Island
  - Kalela Island or Magambo Island
- Rukwa Region
  - Manda Island
  - Kipili Archipelago
    - Kerenge Island
    - Lupita Island
    - Izinga Island
    - Mvuna Island
    - Mwila Island
    - Nkondwe Island
    - Kamamba Island
    - Kasisi Island
    - Ulwile Island or Ulilwe Island
  - Kala Island
  - Singa Island
  - Nausingili Island
  - Malesa Island
  - Mikongolo Island
  - Kalala Island
  - Kashia Island
  - Yamsamba Island
  - Lwilwi Island
  - Kasola Island
  - Kauchi Island
  - Kisi Island

=== Lake Nyasa ===
- Ruvuma Region
  - Nyasa District
    - Mbamba Island
    - Lundo Island

=== Indian Ocean ===
- Tanga Region
  - Mkinga District
    - Ulenge Island
    - Mwewe Island
    - Kirui Island
  - Tanga District
    - Kwale Island
    - Tanga Island
    - Yambe Island
    - Karange Island
  - Pangani District
    - Maziwi Island
- Dar es Salaam Region
  - Kinondoni District
    - Mbudya Island
    - Bongoyo Island
    - Pangavini Island
    - Fungu Yasini Island
  - Kigamboni District
    - Sinda Island
    - Kendwa Island
    - Makatumbi Islands
    - Kimbubu Island
    - Latham Island
- Pwani Region
  - Bagamoyo District
    - Mapopo Island
  - Mafia District
    - Mafia Archipelago
      - Mafia Island
      - Jibondo Island
      - Juani Island
      - Chole Island
      - Bwejuu Island
      - Shungumbili Island
      - Barakuni Island
      - Miewi Island
      - Niororo Island
  - Mkuranga District
    - Kwale Island
    - Koma Island
    - Pemba Juu Island
    - Chokaa Islands
    - North Fanjove Island
- Lindi Region
  - Kilwa District
    - Songosongo Archipelago
      - Songo Songo Island
      - Okuza Island
      - Nyuni Island
      - Fanjove Island
    - Kilwa Kisiwani
    - Watiro Island
    - Sanje ya Kati Island
    - Songo Mnara Island
- Mtwara Region
  - Mtwara-Mikindani District
    - Mongo Island, also known of Membelwa
    - Nakitumbe Island
- Mjini Magharibi Region
  - Mjini District
    - Chumbe Island
    - Bawe Island
    - Changuu
    - Chapwani Island
    - Ukombe Island
    - Kwale Island, Zanzibar
    - Pamunda Island also known as Komunda Island
    - Sume Island
    - Miwi Island
    - Niamembe Island
    - Pungume Island
- Unguja North Region
  - Kaskazini A District
    - Zanzibar Archipelago
    - Tumbatu Island
    - Daloni Island
    - Popo Island
    - Mwana wa Mwana Island
- Unguja South Region
  - Kusini District
    - Uzi Island
    - Vundwe Island
    - Pengeleni Island
- Pemba North Region
  - Micheweni District
    - Mbali Island
  - Wete District
    - Njao Island
    - Fundo Island
    - Uvinje Island
    - Kokota Island
    - Funzi Island, Pemba
    - Pembe Island
    - Kojani Island
- Pemba South Region
  - Chake Chake District
    - Misali Island
  - Mkoani District
    - Makongwe Island
    - Kwata Island
    - Matumbwi Makubwa Island
    - Matumbini Island
    - Panza Island
    - Jombe Island also known as Yombi Island
    - Kiweni Island
    - Mtangani Island
