= Kwata Island =

Island in Mkoani, Pemba South, Tanzania

- Location within Tanzania

Geography
- Location: Zanzibar Channel
- Coordinates: 05°22′05″S 39°34′57″E
- Archipelago: Zanzibar Archipelago
- Adjacent to: Indian Ocean
- Length: 0.4 km (0.25 mi)
- Width: 0.2 km (0.12 mi)

Administration
- Tanzania
- Region: Pemba South Region
- District: Mkoani District

Demographics
- Languages: Swahili
- Ethnic groups: Hadimu

Kwata Island (Kisiwa cha Kwata, in Swahili) is an island located in Makoongwe ward of Mkoani District in Pemba South Region, Tanzania.

== See also ==
- List of islands of Tanzania
