= Makongwe Island =

Island in Mkoani, Pemba South, Tanzania

- Location within Tanzania

Geography
- Location: Zanzibar Channel
- Coordinates: 05°22′44″S 39°37′20″E
- Archipelago: Zanzibar Archipelago
- Adjacent to: Indian Ocean
- Area: 2.6 km^{2} (1.0 sq mi)
- Length: 3.2 km (1.99 mi)
- Width: 1.2 km (0.75 mi)

Administration
- Tanzania
- Region: Pemba South Region
- District: Mkoani District

Demographics
- Languages: Swahili
- Ethnic groups: Hadimu

Makongwe Island or also spelt Makoongwe Island (Kisiwa cha Makongwe, in Swahili) is an island located in Makoongwe ward of Mkoani District in Pemba South Region, Tanzania.

== See also ==
- List of islands of Tanzania
