= Mtangani Island =

Island in Mkoani, Pemba South, Tanzania

- Location within Tanzania

Geography
- Location: Zanzibar Channel
- Coordinates: 05°24′07″S 39°46′58″E
- Archipelago: Zanzibar Archipelago
- Adjacent to: Indian Ocean
- Length: 2.1 km (1.3 mi)
- Width: 0.5 km (0.31 mi)

Administration
- Tanzania
- Region: Pemba South Region
- District: Mkoani District

Demographics
- Languages: Swahili
- Ethnic groups: Hadimu

Mtangani Island (Kisiwa cha Mtangani, in Swahili) is an island located in Kiwani ward of Mkoani District in Pemba South Region, Tanzania.

== See also ==
- List of islands of Tanzania
