= Kiweni Island =

Island in Mkoani, Pemba South, Tanzania

- Location within Tanzania

Geography
- Location: Zanzibar Channel
- Coordinates: 05°26′49″S 39°44′15″E
- Archipelago: Zanzibar Archipelago
- Adjacent to: Indian Ocean
- Length: 4.6 km (2.86 mi)
- Width: 1.7 km (1.06 mi)

Administration
- Tanzania
- Region: Pemba South Region
- District: Mkoani District

Demographics
- Languages: Swahili
- Ethnic groups: Hadimu

Kiweni Island (Swahili: Kisiwa cha Kiweni), sometimes also known as Shamiani Island, is an island located in the Kisiwa Shamiani ward of Mkoani District in Pemba South Region, Tanzania.

== See also ==
- List of islands of Tanzania
