= Pembe Island =

Island in Wete, North Pemba, Tanzania

- Location within Tanzania

Geography
- Location: Zanzibar Channel
- Coordinates: 05°08′11″S 39°40′37″E
- Archipelago: Zanzibar Archipelago
- Adjacent to: Indian Ocean
- Area: 0.3 km^{2} (0.12 sq mi)
- Length: 0.8 km (0.5 mi)
- Width: 0.7 km (0.43 mi)

Administration
- Tanzania
- Region: Pemba North Region
- District: Wete District

Demographics
- Languages: Swahili
- Ethnic groups: Hadimu

Pembe Island (Kisiwa cha Pembe, in Swahili) is an island located in Mtambwe Kusini ward of Wete District in Pemba North Region, Tanzania.

== See also ==
- List of islands of Tanzania
