= Kojani Island =

Island in Wete, North Pemba, Tanzania

- Location within Tanzania

Geography
- Location: Zanzibar Channel
- Coordinates: 05°05′04″S 39°51′50″E
- Archipelago: Zanzibar Archipelago
- Adjacent to: Indian Ocean
- Area: 7.0 km^{2} (2.7 sq mi)
- Length: 7.5 km (4.66 mi)
- Width: 3.3 km (2.05 mi)

Administration
- Tanzania
- Region: Pemba North Region
- District: Wete District

Demographics
- Languages: Swahili
- Ethnic groups: Hadimu

Kojani Island also known as Kojana Island (Kisiwa cha Kojani, in Swahili) is an island located in Kojani ward of Wete District in Pemba North Region, Tanzania. The island has a population of 15,000 people most reside at the historic Kojani town. Water supply for the island is pumped from mainland Pemba through a piped system.

== See also ==
- List of islands of Tanzania
