= Jombe Island =

Island in Mkoani, Pemba South, Tanzania

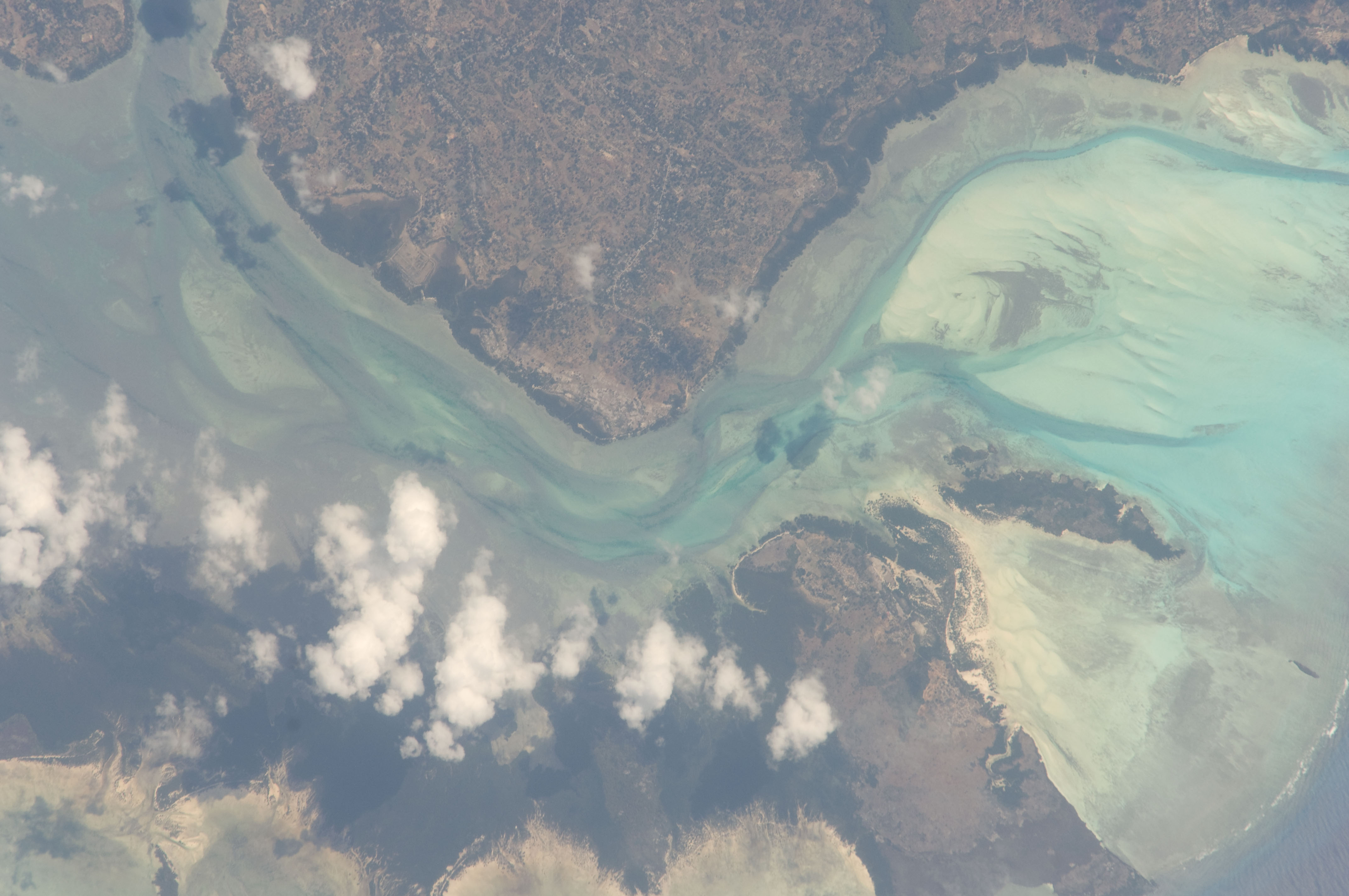
- Jombe Island

- Location within Tanzania

Geography
- Location: Zanzibar Channel
- Coordinates: 05°27′35″S 39°39′49″E
- Archipelago: Zanzibar Archipelago
- Adjacent to: Indian Ocean
- Length: 2.1 km (1.3 mi)
- Width: 0.5 km (0.31 mi)

Administration
- Tanzania
- Region: Pemba South Region
- District: Mkoani District

Demographics
- Languages: Swahili
- Ethnic groups: Hadimu

Jombe Island sometimes also known as Yombi Island (Kisiwa cha Jombe, in Swahili) is an island located in the Kisiwa Panza ward of Mkoani District in Pemba South Region, Tanzania.

== See also ==
- List of islands of Tanzania
