= Kokota Island =

Island in Wete, North Pemba, Tanzania

- Location within Tanzania

Geography
- Location: Zanzibar Channel
- Coordinates: 05°08′32″S 39°38′27″E
- Archipelago: Zanzibar Archipelago
- Adjacent to: Indian Ocean
- Area: 5.6 km^{2} (2.2 sq mi)
- Length: 2.5 km (1.55 mi)
- Width: 0.6 km (0.37 mi)

Administration
- Tanzania
- Region: Pemba North Region
- District: Wete District

Demographics
- Languages: Swahili
- Ethnic groups: Hadimu

Kokota Island (Kisiwa cha Kokota, in Swahili) is an island located in Mtambwe Kusini ward of Wete District in Pemba North Region, Tanzania.

== See also ==
- List of islands of Tanzania
