= Pengeleni Island =

Island in Unguja South, Zanzibar, Tanzania

- Location within Tanzania

Geography
- Location: Zanzibar Channel
- Coordinates: 06°23′26″S 39°24′46″E
- Archipelago: Zanzibar Archipelago
- Adjacent to: Indian Ocean
- Length: 0.8 km (0.5 mi)
- Width: 0.4 km (0.25 mi)

Administration
- Tanzania
- Region: Unguja South Region
- District: Kaskazini A District

Demographics
- Languages: Swahili
- Ethnic groups: Hadimu

Pengeleni Island (Kisiwa cha Pengeleni, in Swahili) is a small island located in N'gambwa ward of Kusini District in Unguja South Region, Tanzania. The coral island lies south of Uzi Island and north of Vundwe Island.
