= Matumbini Island =

Island in Mkoani, Pemba South, Tanzania

- Location within Tanzania

Geography
- Location: Zanzibar Channel
- Coordinates: 05°25′21″S 39°35′40″E
- Archipelago: Zanzibar Archipelago
- Adjacent to: Indian Ocean
- Length: 7.7 km (4.78 mi)
- Width: 3.1 km (1.93 mi)

Administration
- Tanzania
- Region: Pemba South Region
- District: Mkoani District

Demographics
- Languages: Swahili
- Ethnic groups: Hadimu

Matumbini Island (Kisiwa cha Matumbini, in Swahili) is an island located in Kisiwa Panza ward of Mkoani District in Pemba South Region, Tanzania.

== See also ==
- List of islands of Tanzania
