= Njao Island =

Island in Wete, North Pemba, Tanzania

- Location within Tanzania

Geography
- Location: Zanzibar Channel
- Coordinates: 04°58′57″S 39°39′55″E
- Archipelago: Zanzibar Archipelago
- Adjacent to: Indian Ocean
- Area: 11.82 km^{2} (4.56 sq mi)
- Length: 5.8 km (3.6 mi)
- Width: 1.3 km (0.81 mi)

Administration
- Tanzania
- Region: Pemba North Region
- District: Wete District

Demographics
- Languages: Swahili
- Ethnic groups: Hadimu

Njao Island (Kisiwa cha Njao, in Swahili) is a small island located in Gando ward of Wete District in Pemba North Region, Tanzania. Together with the larger Fundo Island, which lies immediately to the south, it forms a natural barrier and breakwater for the harbour of the town of Wete, which lies seven kilometres to the southeast.
