= Misali Island =

Island in Chake Chake, South Pemba, Tanzania

- Location within Tanzania

Geography
- Location: Zanzibar Channel
- Coordinates: 05°14′23″S 39°36′18″E
- Archipelago: Zanzibar Archipelago
- Adjacent to: Indian Ocean
- Area: 0.9 km^{2} (0.35 sq mi)
- Length: 2.0 km (1.24 mi)
- Width: 0.8 km (0.5 mi)

Administration
- Tanzania
- Region: Pemba South Region
- District: Chake Chake District

Demographics
- Languages: Swahili
- Ethnic groups: Hadimu

Misali Island (Kisiwa cha Misali, in Swahili) is an island located in Ndagoni ward of Chake Chake District in Pemba South Region, Tanzania, located off the west coast of Pemba Island, in the Zanzibar Archipelago.

== Cultural and religious significance ==
According to local legend, Prophet Hadhara declared the island itself a prayer mat when none was available. The northern beach faces Mecca, and the name "Misali" comes from the Swahili word for "prayer rug."

The island’s sacred status has influenced environmental practices. In the 1990s, NGOs such as CARE International worked with religious leaders to promote sustainable fishing, aligning conservation with Islamic values. A PBS documentary highlighted how imams quoted Quranic verses to encourage reef protection, such as “Allah does not love the wasters” (7:31).

A 2005 BBC report documented resistance to early conservation efforts until religious leaders emphasized Quranic obligations. One fisherman remarked, “It’s easy to ignore the government, but no-one can break God’s law.”

== Geography ==
Misali Island is situated in the Pemba Channel, approximately 10 km west of Chake Chake, the capital of Pemba Island. The island covers an area of about 1 square kilometer and is surrounded by a coral reef ecosystem.

== Ecology and conservation ==
=== Biodiversity ===
Misali Island hosts a variety of terrestrial and marine species. The island is a refuge for the Aloe pembana, a native species that was once widespread throughout the islands. The ecosystem supports endangered terrestrial species such as the Pemba flying fox, vervet monkeys, and coconut crabs. The island's reefs are vital habitats and contain more than 300 fish species and 40 coral species. The island is also a key nesting site for green and hawksbill turtles.

=== Conservation program ===
Originally established in 1998 as the Misali Island Marine Conservation Area, later the island was incorporated into the legally protected Pemba Channel Conservation Area (PECCA) under Zanzibari law. The approach to marine protection includes multiple efforts. Daily ranger patrols monitor the coral reefs, and community members help enforce bans on destructive practices such as dynamite fishing and spear guns. A visitor fee of $10 per day contributes directly to conservation programs. The program also implements habitat management strategies for coral reef restoration, mangrove replanting near villages, and the designated no-fishing zones that now cover a third of the reef area.

The initiative's success is supported by strong engagement with the community. Islamic environmental education helps align conservation goals with local beliefs. Training in alternative livelihoods including beekeeping and ecotourism reduces pressure on marine resources. Local conservation committees are equipped with reporting systems to help ensure grassroots accountability and sustained participation in the program's goals and outcomes.

=== Habitat restoration ===
Since 2000, the Misali conservation program has included mangrove replanting initiatives along village shores. These efforts, funded by visitor fees, serve dual purposes: creating fish nursery habitats to support fisheries and preventing coastal erosion. Local women's groups lead the planting efforts, with more than 10,000 mangroves established by 2013.

=== Enforcement and patrol system ===
A community-run patrol system enforces fishing rules, using licensed rangers and village committees to report violations. PBS documented how confiscated illegal gear includes spear guns and fine-mesh nets, with fishermen receiving warnings rather than fines for first offenses.

== Tourism ==
Misali Island is promoted as destination for ecotourism activities including snorkeling and scuba diving, nature walks and bird watching, and sustainable fishing tours

Since 1998, visitors have paid a $10 daily conservation fee, which funds patrols and village projects like mangrove restoration.

== Economy ==
To reduce fishing pressure, the conservation program introduced several alternatives for livelihoods of the fishing community.

By 2013, 120 beehives had been established, producing honey for local markets. Women-run seaweed farming plots along the coast were developed, which provided an average income of $5 US per day. The program trained and certified 45 guides to lead snorkeling tours, creating new opportunities in ecotourism.

One fisherman involved in the program said, "The sea cucumbers and octopus we protect today will feed our children tomorrow." The program’s religious messaging has helped shift perspectives on environmental stewardship. Another fisherman told the BBC, "I am more dedicated to protecting the environment now, and a more committed Muslim as well."

== Environmental threats ==
Despite ongoing conservation efforts, Misali Island continues to face several environmental threats. Illegal fishing practices, such as the use of weighted nets that damage coral reefs, remain a persistent problem. Climate change has affected the health of coral ecosystems. Pollution from tourism and nearby communities threatens marine biodiversity. Efforts to develop the island for a tourist resort pose risks to the island and surrounding reef system.

== See also ==
- List of islands of Tanzania
- Pemba Island
- Zanzibar Archipelago
- Islamic environmentalism

== Notes ==
- The documentary series Saving the Ocean with Carl Safina was originally broadcast on PBS in 2013. Episodes remain available through the production company's archives. Carl Safina is a Pulitzer Prize-finalist marine conservationist whose work has been cited in peer-reviewed publications.
