= Fundo Island =

Island in Wete, North Pemba, Tanzania

- Location within Tanzania

Geography
- Location: Zanzibar Channel
- Coordinates: 05°02′56″S 39°38′55″E
- Archipelago: Zanzibar Archipelago
- Adjacent to: Indian Ocean
- Area: 20.9 km^{2} (8.1 sq mi)
- Length: 9.0 km (5.59 mi)
- Width: 1.2 km (0.75 mi)

Administration
- Tanzania
- Region: Pemba North Region
- District: Wete District

Demographics
- Languages: Swahili
- Ethnic groups: Hadimu

Fundo Island (Kisiwa cha Fundo, in Swahili) is an island located in Fundo ward of Wete District in Pemba North Region, Tanzania.

== Overview ==
Fundo is one of the larger minor islands in the archipelago and the largest of those surrounding Pemba. Fundo Island is nine kilometres in length, though barely a kilometre in width, and is surrounded by a reef. Together with the smaller Njao Island, which lies immediately to the north, and several smaller islands to the south, Fundo forms a natural barrier and breakwater for the harbour of the town of Wete, which lies six kilometres to the east.

== Fishing on the island ==
Fundo Island is home to the community of Ndooni village. In 2018, a new management regime was introduced to the fisheries in the area. It was decided for the local octopus fisheries to be closed for three months, in order to allow the stock to recover. This resulted in a huge increase in fisherman's catches after the fishery was re-opened, with the opening day seeing more than a 20-fold jump in daily landings.

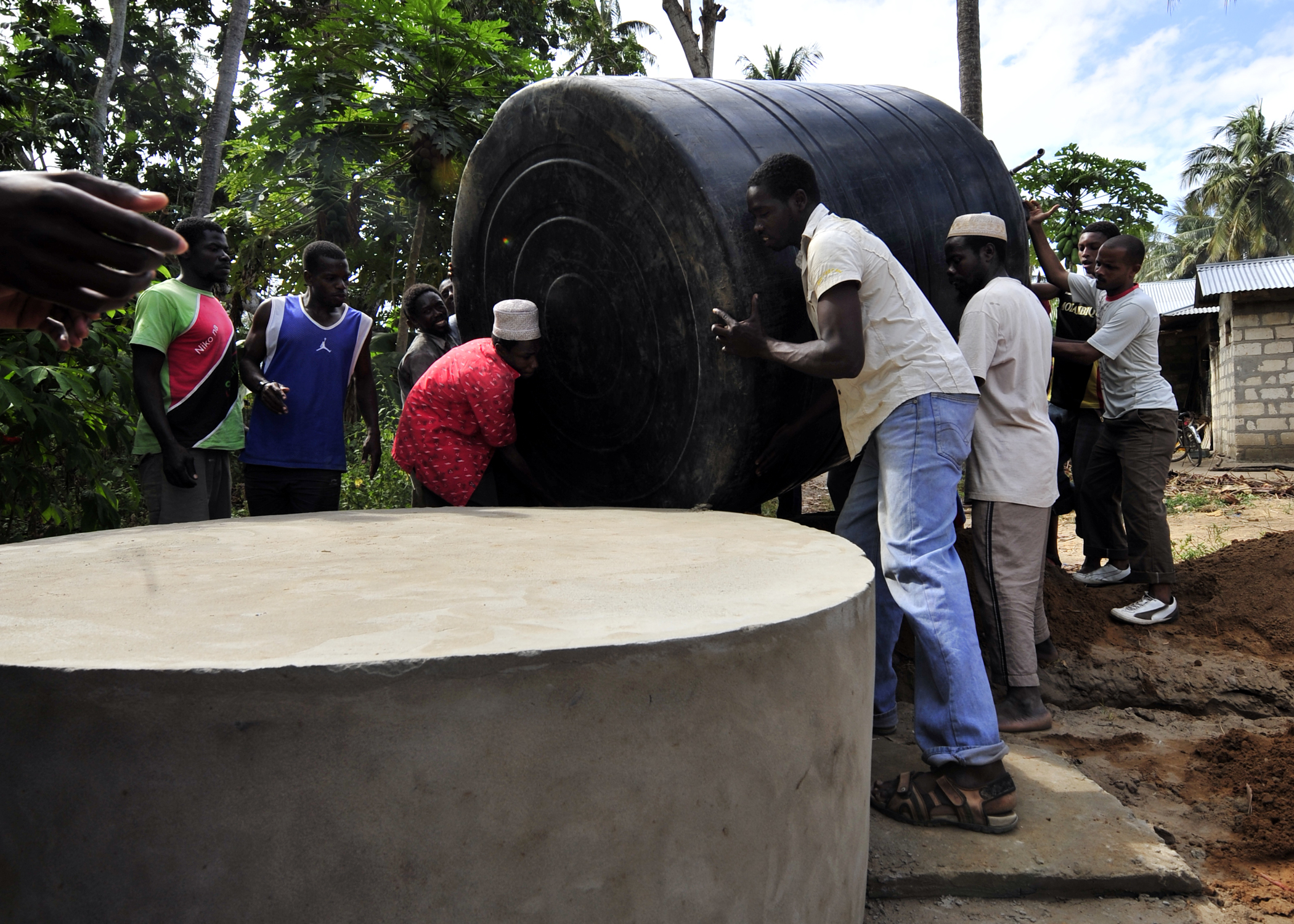
Residents of Fundo Island, a small islet that is part of Pemba Island, carry a 5,000-liter water cistern to a concrete stand
