= Vundwe Island =

Island in Unguja South, Zanzibar, Tanzania

- Location within Tanzania

Geography
- Location: Zanzibar Channel
- Coordinates: 06°24′07″S 39°25′00″E
- Archipelago: Zanzibar Archipelago
- Adjacent to: Indian Ocean
- Area: 1.12 km^{2} (0.43 sq mi)
- Length: 2.4 km (1.49 mi)
- Width: 0.7 km (0.43 mi)

Administration
- Tanzania
- Region: Unguja South Region
- District: Kaskazini A District

Demographics
- Languages: Swahili
- Ethnic groups: Hadimu

Vundwe Island (Kisiwa cha Vundwe, in Swahili) is an island located in N'gambwa ward of Kusini District in Unguja South Region, Tanzania. It lies only 300 m south of Uzi Island and it has an area of 1,4 km^{2}. Its elevation is about 17 m above sea level. The waters surrounding the island are used as a site for commercial fishing.

== Ecology ==
Vundwe is relatively isolated and it is not a protected area, unlike the nearby Kiwengwa/Pongwe Forest Reserve. The island has a high coral rag forest with tall trees like Adansonia digitata baobabs, which has, in recent years, started to be subjected to extensive clearing. This impacts the habitat of the Zanzibar red colobus, an endangered species of red colobus monkey which the island houses. The species population also declines because of poisonings.
