= List of states of South Sudan by Human Development Index =

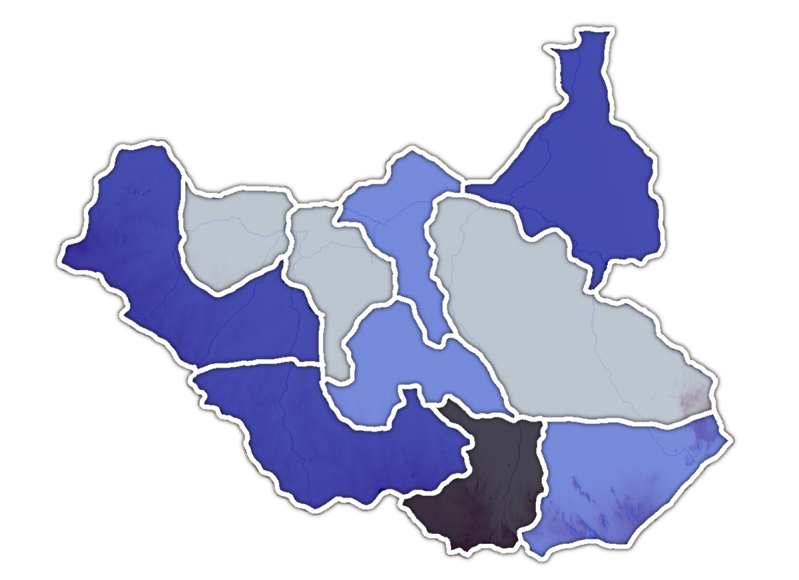
Map of the South Sudan states by Human Development Index in 2021 Legend: >0.450 0.400 – 0.450 0.340 – 0.400 0.300 – 0.340

This is a list of states of South Sudan by Human Development Index as of 2023.

Rank	Region	HDI (2023)
Low human development
1	Central Equatoria	0.468
2	Western Equatoria	0.435
3	Upper Nile	0.428
4	Western Bahr el Ghazal	0.420
–	South Sudan	0.388
5	Eastern Equatoria	0.376
6	Lakes	0.349
7	Unity (with Ruweng)	0.343
8	Jonglei (with Pibor)	0.335
9	Warrap	0.315
10	Northern Bahr el Ghazal	0.313

== See also ==
- List of East African Community sub regions by Human Development Index
- List of countries by Human Development Index
