= Bawe Island =

Island in Mjini Magharibi Region of Zanzibar, Tanzania

- Location within Tanzania

Geography
- Location: Zanzibar Channel
- Coordinates: 06°08′59″S 39°07′56″E
- Archipelago: Zanzibar Archipelago
- Adjacent to: Indian Ocean
- Length: 1.1 km (0.68 mi)
- Width: 0.4 km (0.25 mi)

Administration
- Tanzania
- Region: Mjini Magharibi Region
- District: Mjini
- Ward: Malindi

Demographics
- Languages: Swahili
- Ethnic groups: Hadimu

Bawe Island (Swahili: Kisiwa cha Bawe) is an island in the Mjini Magharibi Region, Tanzania, off the coast of Mjini District. It is situated in the Zanzibar Channel. It is located about 10 km (6.2 mi) offshore Stone Town, the capital of Zanzibar on the island of Unguja. The island is north of Chumbe Island. At the end of the 18th century, sultan Barghash ibn Sa'id of Zanzibar gave the island to the Eastern Telegraph Company, that used it as an operation station for the underwater telegraph cable connecting Zanzibar to Seychelles and Aden. This agreement was extended by sultan Khalifa ibn Sa'id in 1889, in favor of Cable & Wireless, that also built houses on the island to accommodate their personnel. Nowadays, Bawe is solely a tourist destination.
