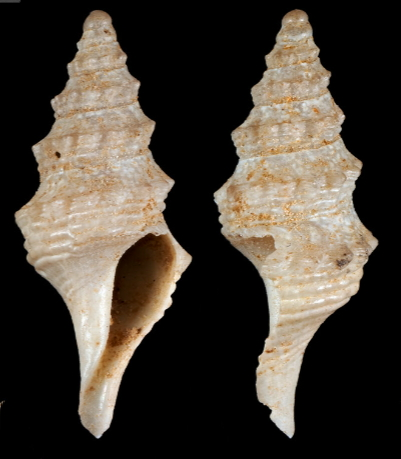
- Shell of Leucosyrinx erna (holotype in the Museum für Naturkunde)

Scientific classification
- Kingdom: Animalia
- Phylum: Mollusca
- Class: Gastropoda
- Subclass: Caenogastropoda
- Order: Neogastropoda
- Superfamily: Conoidea
- Family: Pseudomelatomidae
- Genus: Leucosyrinx
- Species: L. erna

Binomial name
- Leucosyrinx erna Thiele, 1925

= Leucosyrinx erna =

Species of gastropod

Leucosyrinx erna is a species of sea snail, a marine gastropod mollusk in the family Pseudomelatomidae, the turrids and allies.

== Description ==
The species is known from three dead-collected and immature shells (maximal shell length 7.8 mm). It is characterized by strong and very closely spaced spiral cords below shoulder that was not found in other species of Leucosyrinx, although somewhat similar but broader cords are also found in Leucosyrinx nodulocordata.I n the absence of any data on anatomy, it is retained in Leucosyrinx with strong doubts.

== Distribution ==
This marine species was found in the Zanzibar Channel.
