= Melanella sansibarica =

Scientific classification
- Kingdom: Animalia
- Phylum: Mollusca
- Class: Gastropoda
- Subclass: Caenogastropoda
- Order: Littorinimorpha
- Family: Eulimidae
- Genus: Melanella
- Species: M. sansibarica

Binomial name
- Melanella sansibarica (Thiele, 1925)

Synonyms
- Eulima sansibarica Thiele, 1925

Species of gastropod

Melanella sansibarica is a species of sea snail, a marine gastropod mollusk in the family Eulimidae.

== Description ==
The shell measures 8.5 mm in height, while both its diameter and the height of the aperture are 2 mm.

(Original description in German) The shell is rather similar to Eulima adamsii G. B. Sowerby II, 1866, but is more slender, has a less rounded body whorl, and a narrower aperture.

The white, glossy, slightly translucent shell is high and slenderly turreted, with a fairly pointed apex. It consists of 14 whorls that increase rather evenly and are flat, with a simple suture. The body whorl is only slightly convex below and bears an oblique, thickened columellar margin, overlain by a moderately strong callus. The outer lip is somewhat thickened and projects forwards in a rounded curve at the middle. The aperture is narrow and oblique, and sharply angled above.

== Distribution ==
This marine species occurs off the Zanzibar Channel, found at a depth of 463 m.
