= Chapwani Island =

Private island in Zanziabr, Tanzania

- Location within Tanzania

Geography
- Location: Zanzibar Channel
- Coordinates: 06°07′37″S 39°11′31″E
- Archipelago: Zanzibar Archipelago
- Adjacent to: Indian Ocean
- Length: 0.7 km (0.43 mi)
- Width: 0.1 km (0.06 mi)

Administration
- Tanzania
- Region: Mjini Magharibi Region
- District: Mjini
- Ward: Malindi

Demographics
- Languages: Swahili
- Ethnic groups: Hadimu

Chapwani Island (Kisiwa cha Chapwani, in Swahili) is a private island located in Malindi ward of Mjini District in Mjini Magharibi Region, Tanzania. A British naval cemetery located in Chapwani serves as the last resting place for servicemen who died while serving in Zanzibar. These are the graves of those who perished in the attack by the German cruiser SMS Königsberg on the British protected cruiser HMS Pegasus during World War One. In terms of marine protection, Changuu and Chapwani reefs were seen as less protected, whereas Chumbe reefs and Kizimkazi reefs were thought to be well protected.
