= Miwi Island =

Protected island in Mjini Magharibi Region of Zanziabr, Tanzania

- Location within Tanzania

Geography
- Location: Zanzibar Channel
- Coordinates: 06°20′39″S 39°20′07″E
- Archipelago: Zanzibar Archipelago
- Adjacent to: Indian Ocean
- Length: 1.17 km (0.727 mi)
- Width: 0.46 km (0.286 mi)

Administration
- Tanzania
- Region: Mjini Magharibi Region
- District: Mjini
- Ward: Fumba

Demographics
- Languages: Swahili
- Ethnic groups: Hadimu

Miwi Island (Kisiwa cha Miwi, in Swahili) is a protected island located in Fumba ward of Mjini District in Mjini Magharibi Region, Tanzania. One of the Menai Bay islands, made of limestone, the island is a part of the Menai Bay Marine Conservation Area.
