= List of regions of Tanzania by Human Development Index =

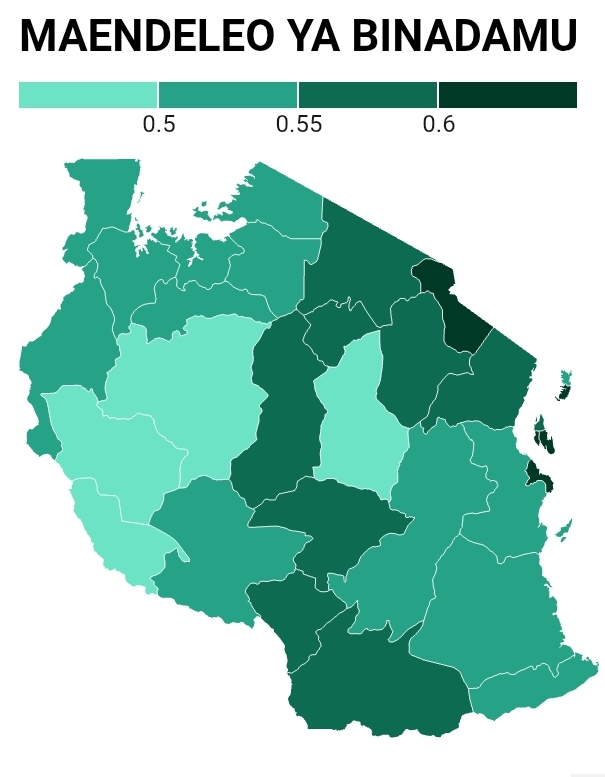
Tanzanian regions by HDI

This is a list of regions of Tanzania by Human Development Index based on data for the year 2022.

Rank		Region	HDI	
2022	Change from 2017	Region	2022 Score	Change from 2017
Medium human development
1	Steady	Zanzibar City	0.678	▲0.0
2	Steady	Dar es Salaam	0.653	▲0.023
3	▲1	Kilimanjaro	0.640	▲0.025
4	▼1	South Zanzibar	0.639	▲0.024
5	Steady	South Pemba	0.603	▲0.024
6	Steady	North Zanzibar	0.584	▲0.023
7	Steady	Iringa & Njombe	0.577	▲0.024
8	Steady	Tanga	0.569	▲0.022
9	Steady	Arusha & Manyara	0.568	▲0.023
10	Steady	Ruvuma	0.555	▲0.022
11	Steady	Singida	0.554	▲0.022
Low human development
	Steady	Tanzania (average)	0.549	▲0.022
12	Steady	North Pemba	0.548	▲0.022
13	Steady	Morogoro	0.546	▲0.021
14	Steady	Mbeya	0.543	▲0.021
15	Steady	Mara	0.541	▲0.021
16	Steady	Pwani	0.525	▲0.021
17	Steady	Geita & Mwanza	0.523	▲0.020
18	Steady	Kagera	0.521	▲0.021
19	Steady	Kigoma	0.520	▲0.022
20	Steady	Lindi	0.509	▲0.024
21	Steady	Shinyanga & Simiyu	0.508	▲0.020
22	Steady	Mtwara	0.507	▲0.020
23	Steady	Dodoma	0.497	▲0.020
24	Steady	Katavi & Rukwa	0.483	▲0.020
25	Steady	Tabora	0.482	▲0.019

== See also ==
- List of East African Community sub regions by Human Development Index
