= Nakitumbe Island =

Island in Mtwara District of Mtwara Region

- Location within Tanzania

Geography
- Location: Sea of Zanj
- Coordinates: 10°15′06″S 40°18′38″E
- Length: 0.3 km (0.19 mi)
- Width: 0.1 km (0.06 mi)

Administration
- Tanzania
- Region: Mtwara Region
- District: Mtwara District
- Ward: Msanga Mkuu

Demographics
- Languages: Swahili
- Ethnic groups: Makonde

Nakitumbe Island (Kisiwa cha Nakitumbe, in Swahili) is an island located in Msanga Mkuu ward of Mtwara District in Mtwara Region, Tanzania. The Island is inside Mnazi Bay. Additionally, the island is deserted and is included within the Mnazi Bay-Ruvuma Estuary Marine Park.
