= Mongo Island =

Island in Mtwara District of Mtwara Region

- Location within Tanzania

Geography
- Location: Sea of Zanj
- Coordinates: 10°14′55″S 40°20′10″E
- Length: 4.0 km (2.49 mi)
- Width: 1.8 km (1.12 mi)

Administration
- Tanzania
- Region: Mtwara Region
- District: Mtwara District
- Ward: Msanga Mkuu

Demographics
- Languages: Swahili
- Ethnic groups: Makonde

Mongo Island (Kisiwa cha Mongo, in Swahili) is an island located in Msanga Mkuu ward of Mtwara District in Mtwara Region, Tanzania. Situated within the Mnazi Bay-Ruvuma Estuary Marine Park, the island is likewise uninhabited. It is the largest island in Mtwara territory and is located in Mnazi Bay.
