= List of East African Community sub regions by Human Development Index =

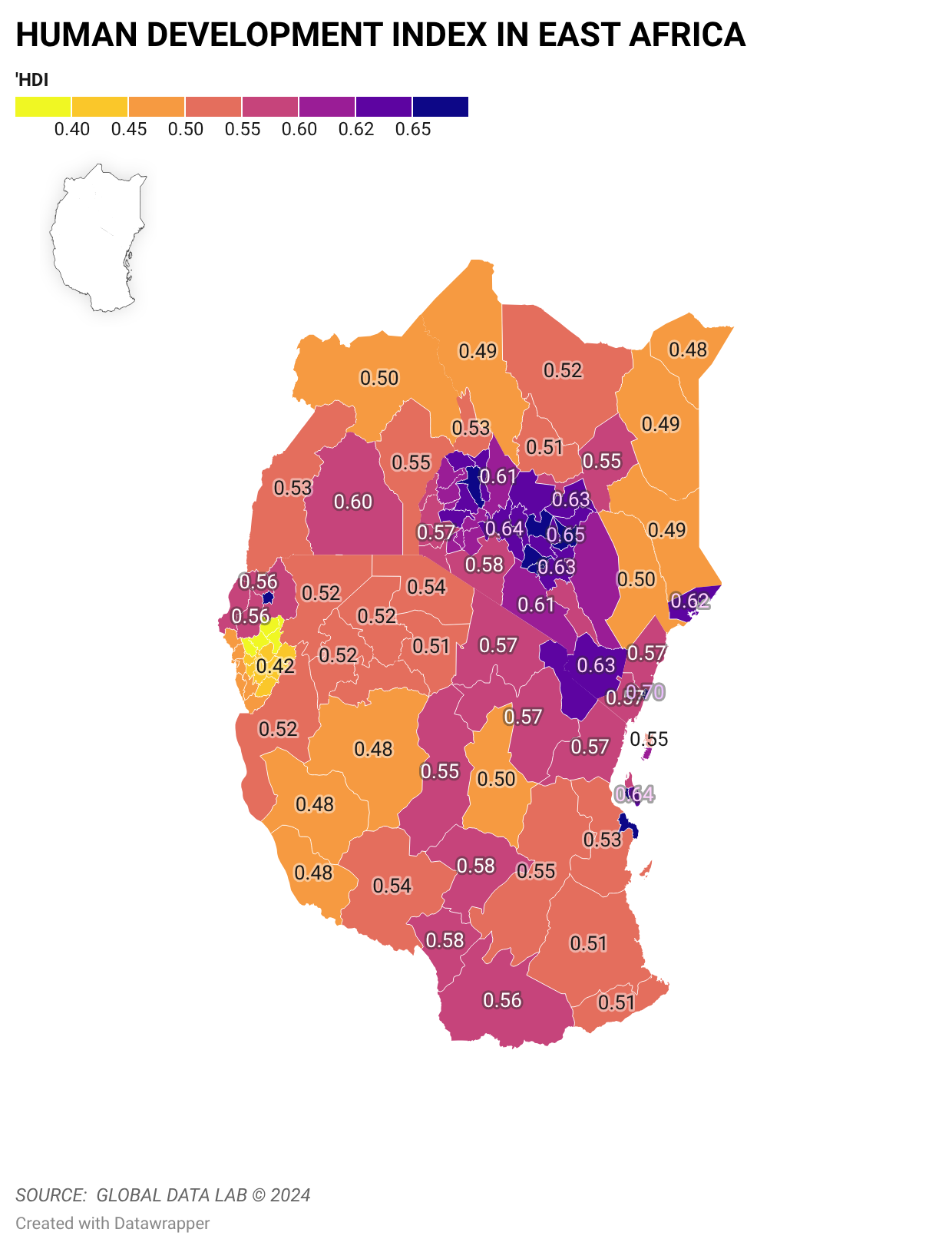
EAC SUB REGIONS BY HDI

Nairobi County has the highest Human Development, with a Human Development Index of 0.771. Mombasa County, Nyeri County, and the city of Zanzibar follow, having Medium human development. Jubaland, Hirshabelle, Southwest Somalia, and East Equatoria have the lowest Human Development. Nairobi County is the only sub region that has High Human Development, 54 sub regions fall under Medium Human Development, while 62 sub regions are categorized under Low Human There is no state with Very High Human Development. The Human Development of East Africa Community is 0.512.

== List ==
Rank	Region	HDI	Country
High Human Development (≥ 0.7)
1	Nairobi	0.771	Kenya
Medium Human Development (≥ 0.55)
2	Mombasa	0.698	Kenya
3	Nyeri	0.678	Kenya
4	Zanzibar City	0.678	Tanzania
5	Kiambu	0.663	Kenya
6	Uasin Gishu	0.654	Kenya
7	Dar es Salaam	0.653	Tanzania
8	Embu	0.650	Kenya
9	Kirinyaga	0.646	Kenya
10	Kigali	0.644	Rwanda
11	Nakuru	0.641	Kenya
12	Kilimanjaro	0.640	Tanzania
13	South Zanzibar	0.639	Tanzania
14	Nyandarua	0.637	Kenya
15	Laikipia	0.635	Kenya
16	Machakos	0.633	Kenya
17	Meru	0.632	Kenya
18	Taita Taveta	0.630	Kenya
19	Nandi	0.627	Kenya
20	Tharaka Nithi	0.626	Kenya
21	Murang’a	0.625	Kenya
22	Kisumu	0.621	Kenya
23	Elgeyo Marakwet	0.620	Kenya
24	Trans Nzoia	0.620	Kenya
25	Lamu	0.620	Kenya
26	Kericho	0.619	Kenya
27	Bungoma	0.618	Kenya
28	Nyamira	0.616	Kenya
29	Bomet	0.613	Kenya
30	Kisii	0.613	Kenya
31	Baringo	0.609	Kenya
32	Kajiado	0.609	Kenya
33	Kakamega	0.606	Kenya
34	South Pemba	0.603	Tanzania
35	Kitui	0.602	Kenya
36	Vihiga	0.602	Kenya
37	Makueni	0.595	Kenya
38	Busia	0.594	Kenya
39	North Zanzibar	0.584	Tanzania
40	Siaya	0.583	Kenya
41	Kinshasa	0.582	Democratic Republic of the Congo
42	Narok	0.578	Kenya
43	Iringa	0.577	Tanzania
44	Njombe	0.577	Tanzania
45	Kilifi	0.574	Kenya
46	Homa Bay	0.573	Kenya
47	Kwale	0.573	Kenya
48	Tanga	0.569	Tanzania
49	Arusha	0.568	Tanzania
50	Manyara	0.568	Tanzania
51	Migori	0.567	Kenya
52	Ruvuma	0.555	Tanzania
53	Isiolo	0.554	Kenya
Low Human Development (< 0.55)
55	North Pemba	0.548	Tanzania
56	Morogoro	0.546	Tanzania
57	Mbeya	0.543	Tanzania
58	Mara	0.541	Tanzania
59	Eastern Province	0.540	Rwanda
60	Western Province	0.535	Rwanda
61	West Pokot	0.534	Kenya
62	Southern Province	0.526	Rwanda
63	Northern Province	0.525	Rwanda
64	Pwani	0.525	Tanzania
65	Geita	0.523	Tanzania
66	Mwanza	0.523	Tanzania
67	Marsabit	0.522	Kenya
68	Kagera	0.521	Tanzania
69	Kigoma	0.520	Tanzania
70	Samburu	0.509	Kenya
71	Lindi	0.509	Tanzania
72	Shinyanga	0.508	Tanzania
73	Simiyu	0.508	Tanzania
74	Mtwara	0.507	Tanzania
75	North Kivu	0.504	Democratic Republic of the Congo
76	Tana River	0.497	Kenya
77	Dodoma	0.497	Tanzania
78	Garissa	0.494	Kenya
79	South Kivu	0.492	Democratic Republic of the Congo
80	Turkana	0.492	Kenya
81	Wajir	0.491	Kenya
82	Mandera	0.484	Kenya
83	Katavi	0.483	Tanzania
84	Rukwa	0.483	Tanzania
85	Tabora	0.482	Tanzania
86	Bas-Congo	0.481	Democratic Republic of the Congo
87	West Region	0.469	Burundi
88	Orientale	0.468	Democratic Republic of the Congo
89	Katanga	0.467	Democratic Republic of the Congo
90	Banadir	0.459	Somalia
91	Central Equatoria	0.459	South Sudan
92	Bandundu	0.458	Democratic Republic of the Congo
93	Equateur	0.456	Democratic Republic of the Congo
94	South Region	0.452	Burundi
95	Kasai Oriental	0.449	Democratic Republic of the Congo
96	Maniema	0.430	Democratic Republic of the Congo
97	Northern Bahr el Ghazal	0.426	South Sudan
98	Middle Region	0.422	Burundi
99	Upper Nile	0.422	South Sudan
100	Somaliland	0.417	Somalia
101	Western Bahr el Ghazal	0.412	South Sudan
102	Puntland	0.404	Somalia
103	East Region	0.403	Burundi
104	Kasai-Occidental	0.403	Democratic Republic of the Congo
105	North Region	0.372	Burundi
106	Eastern Equatoria	0.367	South Sudan
107	Lakes	0.344	South Sudan
108	Unity	0.340	South Sudan
109	Ruweng	0.340	South Sudan
110	Jonglei	0.331	South Sudan
111	Pibor	0.331	South Sudan
112	Galmudug	0.327	Somalia
113	Warrap	0.308	South Sudan
114	Western Equatoria	0.306	South Sudan
115	Southwest	0.304	Somalia
116	Hirshabelle	0.303	Somalia
117	Jubaland	0.287	Somalia
