= Mapopo Island =

Island in Pwani Region of Tanzania

- Location within Tanzania

Geography
- Location: Zanzibar Channel
- Coordinates: 6°28′00″S 38°58′34″E
- Length: 0.6 km (0.37 mi)
- Width: 0.4 km (0.25 mi)

Administration
- Tanzania
- Region: Pwani Region
- District: Bagamoyo District
- Ward: Zinga

Demographics
- Languages: Swahili
- Ethnic groups: Zaramo

Mapopo Island (Kisiwa cha Mapopo, in Swahili) is an uninhabited island located in Zinga ward of Bagamoyo District in northern Pwani Region of Tanzania. Since there are many bats living on the island, the name of the island is derived from the Swahili word for bat.
