= Watiro Island =

Island in Kilwa District of Lindi Region

- Location within Tanzania

Geography
- Location: Sea of Zanj
- Coordinates: 9°00′08″S 39°32′35″E
- Length: 0.8 km (0.5 mi)
- Width: 0.6 km (0.37 mi)

Administration
- Tanzania
- Region: Lindi Region
- District: Kilwa District
- Ward: Kilwa Masoko

Demographics
- Languages: Swahili
- Ethnic groups: Matumbi

Watiro Island (Kisiwa cha Watiro, in Swahili) is an island located in Kilwa Masoko ward of Kilwa District in Lindi Region, Tanzania. The island is just south of Kilwa Kisiwani.
