= Uzi Island =

Island in Unguja South, Zanzibar, Tanzania

- Location within Tanzania

Geography
- Location: Zanzibar Channel
- Coordinates: 06°20′47″S 39°24′13″E
- Archipelago: Zanzibar Archipelago
- Adjacent to: Indian Ocean
- Length: 7.8 km (4.85 mi)
- Width: 3.5 km (2.17 mi)

Administration
- Tanzania
- Region: Unguja South Region
- District: Kaskazini A District

Demographics
- Languages: Swahili
- Ethnic groups: Hadimu

Uzi Island (Kisiwa cha Uzi, in Swahili) is an island located in N'gambwa ward of Kusini District in Unguja South Region, Tanzania.

== Overview ==
The island is connected by causeway through a mangrove forest to the main island of Unguja. It is located immediately to the south of the main island's Unguja Ukuu ruins. The island is undeveloped and contains few occupants who temporarily dwell there for fishing. Uzi Island is six kilometres (3.7 miles) in length, making it the second largest of the smaller islands that surround Unguja (after Tumbatu in the north).

== Environmental Impact ==
58% of the tree stems in the Central Uzi forest have been cut down or burnt in recent years as a result of fires and land conversion for cultivation. A 4% increase in chopped stems compared to four years ago is another indication that Vundwe is experiencing unsustainable logging and rising human disturbance. Similarly, populations of suni antelope, blue duiker, and red colobus monkeys appear to be suffering due to human activity, forest disturbance, and mass loss of habitat.⁣

Different perspectives on conservation tactics and the possible advantages or disadvantages of using tourism to further environmental preservation and economic stability were found in interviews with Uzi locals. Populations of the region's distinctive animal species, such as colobus monkeys, blue duiker, and suni antelope, may be declining as a result of human activities' significant detrimental effects on forest conservation, according to the research.
