= Chokaa Islands =

Island in Pwani Region of Tanzania

- Location within Tanzania

Geography
- Location: Mafia Channel
- Coordinates: 7°24′36″S 39°26′00″E
- Length: 0.1 km (0.06 mi)
- Width: 0.1 km (0.06 mi)

Administration
- Tanzania
- Region: Pwani Region
- District: Mkuranga District
- Ward: Kisiju

Demographics
- Languages: Swahili
- Ethnic groups: Ndengereko & Rufiji

Chokaa Islands (Visiwa vya Chokaa, in Swahili) is an island and a set of islets located in Kisiju ward of Mkuranga District in southern Pwani Region of Tanzania.
