= Mnazi Bay-Ruvuma Estuary Marine Park =

Marine park in Tanzania

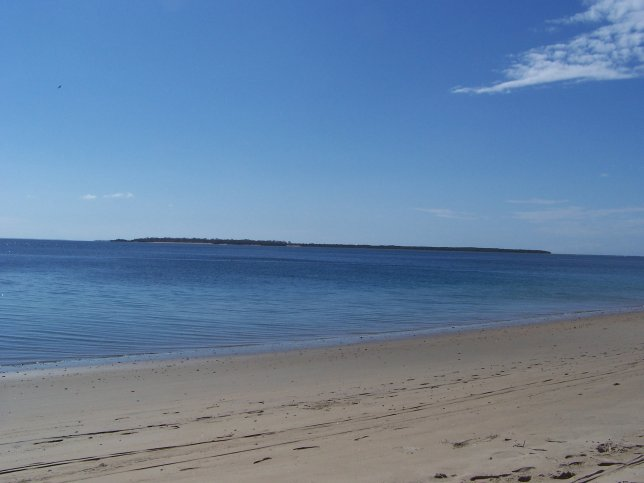
- View across Mnazi Bay

- Location within Tanzania
- Nearest city: Mtwara
- Coordinates: 10°S 40°E
- Area: 650 km^{2} (250 sq mi)
- Established: 2000
- Governing body: Marine Parks & Reserves Authority Unit
- Website: www.marineparks.go.tz/parks_info.php?id=1

The Mnazi Bay-Ruvuma Estuary Marine Park (MBREMP) is a marine park of Tanzania and was established on 1 July 2000 under Act No. 29 of 1994 of Marine Parks and Reserves of Tanzania.

The park is in the Mtwara district of Southeast Tanzania and extends to the border with Mozambique. The area is considered to have globally significant marine biodiversity values and covers 650 square kilometres, of which 33% is on land. The park extends from the northern portion of the Ruvuma Estuary to Mnazi Bay, including the headland of Ras Msangamkuu.

The environment within the park includes mangroves, rocky and sandy shoreline, mudflats, salt pans, fringing coral reefs, lagoonal patch reef, seagrass beds, three islands (Namponda, Mongo and Kisiwa Kidogo) and numerous small rocky islets.

The Park is home to nesting grounds for Green and Hawksbill turtles, and a number of marine mammals have been seen in the area including migrating Humpback whales and the Indo-Pacific Humpback dolphin. A large population of crab-plovers led to the area being designated as an Important Bird Area (IBA) in 2001.

The area was also once home to dugongs but the last confirmed sighting was in 1992, although there have been unconfirmed sightings since.

Close to 30,000 people live within the park, depending mainly on marine resources for their livelihoods; the park includes in its boundaries 11 villages and 8 sub-villages. There are few opportunities for development hence poverty is rife. This has created an over dependence on marine resources and the persistent use of destructive fishing methods.

Gas was discovered in Mnazi Bay in 1982, and wells were brought into operation in 2006. Gas from the wells is now piped to Mtwara where a gas to power plant provides electricity for the Mtwara and Lindi areas. However, the quantity of gas available is far greater and the wells have now become the focus of plans to supply power to the national grid in an attempt to relieve national power supply problems. In 2026, the Tanzanian government announced the discovery of a natural gas field with potential reserves of 223,000,000,000 ft^{3} (6.3×10^{9} m^{3}) in Mnazi Bay.
