= Mkoani District =

District of Pemba South Region, Tanzania

Mkoani
- District
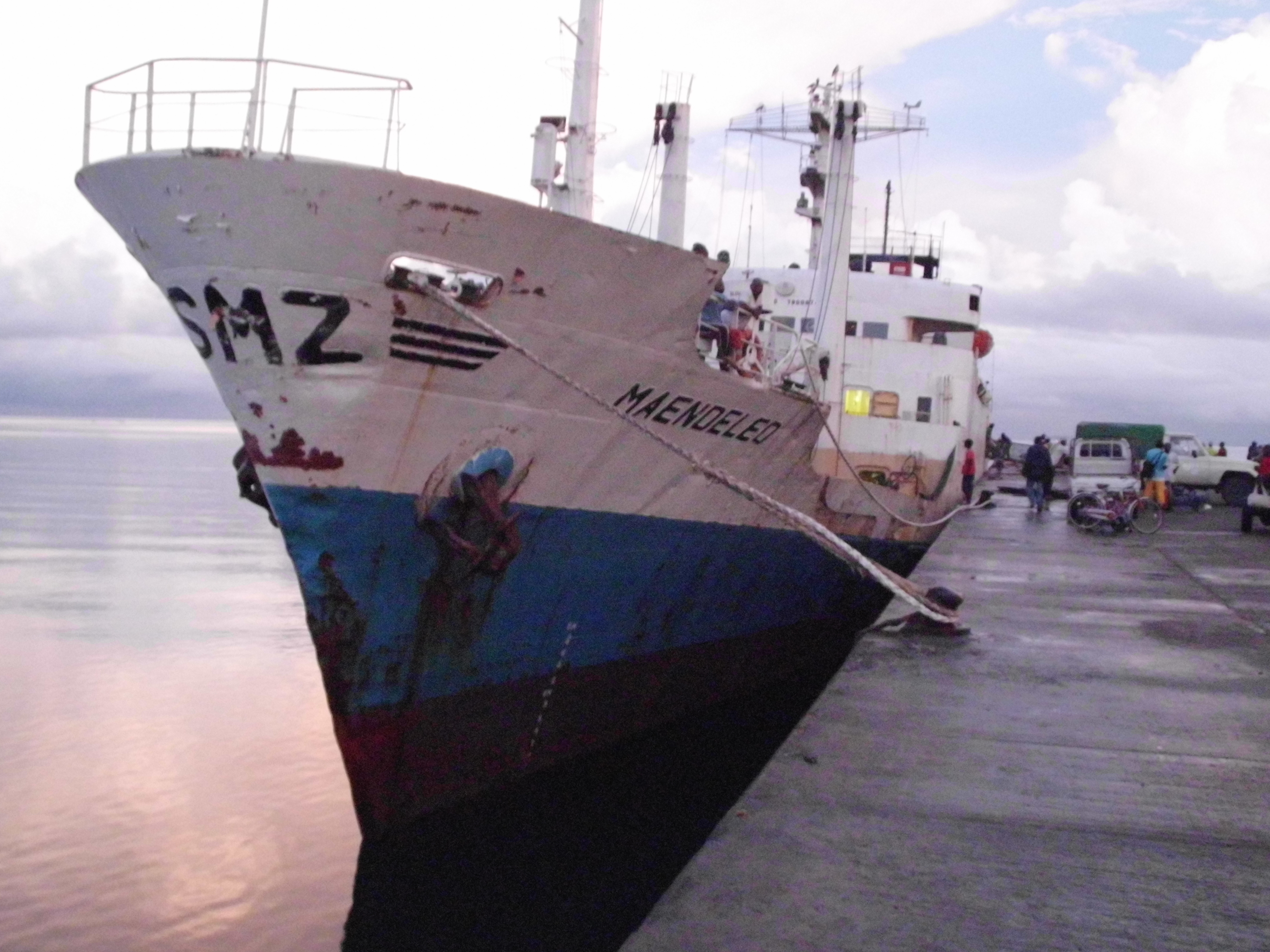
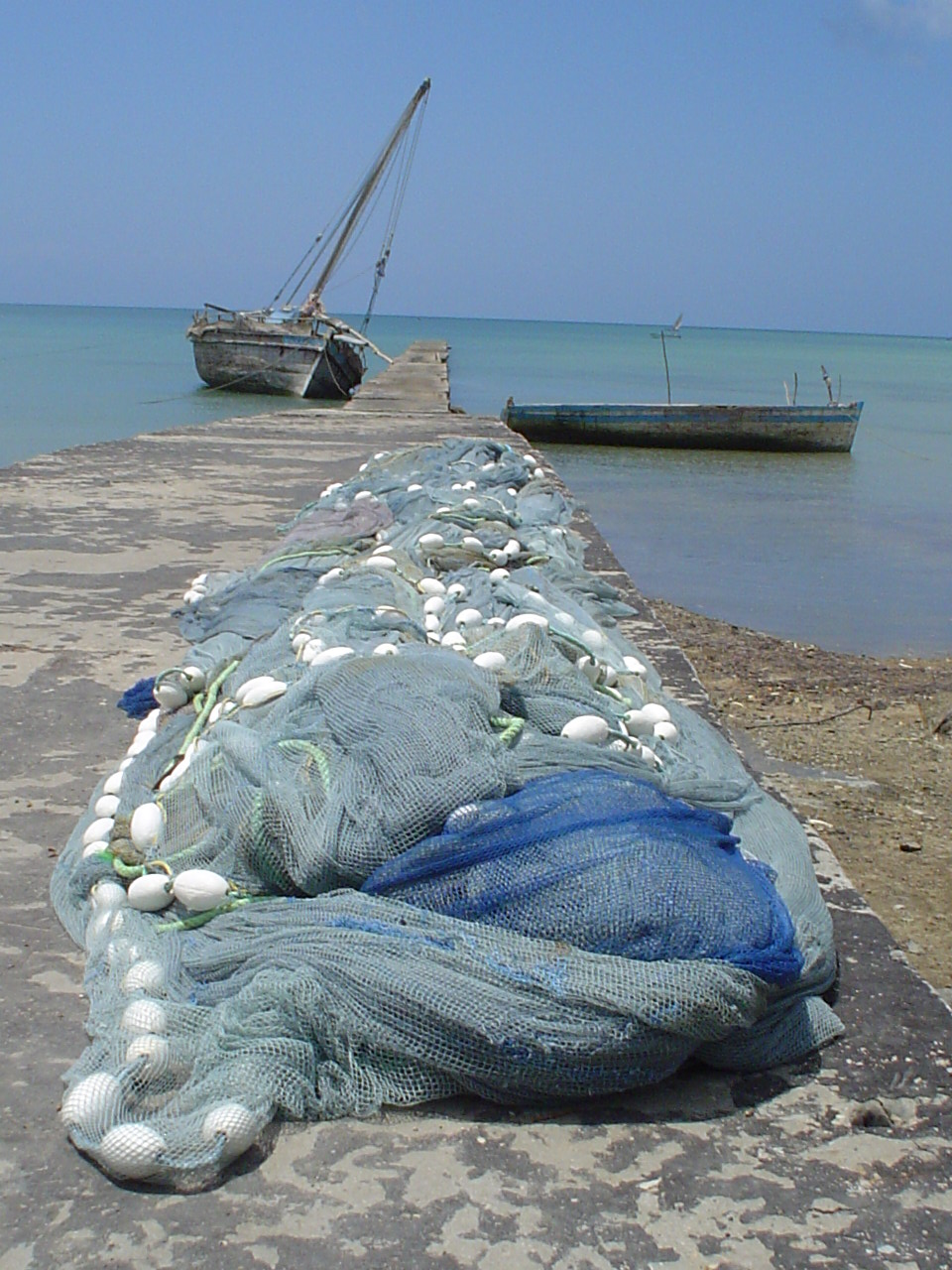
- From top to bottom: Ship at Mkoani Port & Mkoani Port wharf

- Location in Pemba South
- Coordinates: 5°23′3.48″S 39°42′49.32″E
- Country: Tanzania
- Region: Pemba South Region
- Named for: Town of Mkoani
- Capital: Mkoani

Area
  - Total: 256.2 km^{2} (98.9 sq mi)
  - Rank: 1st in Pemba South

Population (2022)
  - Total: 135,052
  - Rank: 1st in Pemba South
  - Density: 527.1/km^{2} (1,365/sq mi)
- Demonym: Pemba Mkoanian

Ethnic groups
  - Settler: Swahili
  - Native: Hadimu

Mkoani District (Wilaya ya Mkoani in Swahili) is one of two administrative districts of Pemba South Region in Tanzania. The district covers an area of 256.2 km^{2} (98.9 sq mi). The district is comparable in size to the land area of Niue. The district has a water border to the east, south and west by the Indian Ocean. The district is bordered to the north by Chake Chake District. The district seat (capital) is the town of Mkoani. According to the 2022 census, the district has a total population of 135,052.

== Administrative subdivisions ==
As of 2012, Mkoani District was administratively divided into 32 wards.

=== Wards ===
1. Chambani
2. Changaweni
3. Chokocho
4. Chumbageni
5. Jombwe
6. Kendwa
7. Kengeja
8. Kisiwa Panza
9. Kiwani
10. Kuukuu

1. Makombeni
2. Makoongwe
3. Mbuguani
4. Mbuyuni
5. Mgagadu
6. Michenzani
7. Minazini
8. Mizingani
9. Mjimbini
10. Mkanyageni

1. Mkungu
2. Mtambile
3. Mtangani
4. Muambe
5. Ng'ombeni
6. Ngwachani
7. Shamiani
8. Shidi
9. Stahabu
10. Ukutini
11. Uweleni
12. Wambaa
