= Zanzibar Archipelago =

Archipelago in Tanzania

Coordinates: 6°33′S 39°34′E

The Zanzibar Archipelago

Unguja Island and Pemba Island

The Zanzibar Archipelago (Funguvisiwa la Zanzibar, in Swahili, Arabic: أرخبيل زنجبار) is a group of islands off the coast of mainland Tanzania in the Sea of Zanj. The archipelago is also known as the Spice Islands.

There are three main islands with permanent human settlements, Unguja Island (a.k.a. Zanzibar Island), Pemba Island, and Mafia Island. There is also a fourth coral island, Latham Island, that serves as an essential breeding ground for seabirds. There are also a number of smaller islets that surround these islands.

Most of the archipelago belongs to Zanzibar, a semi-autonomous region of Tanzania, while the neighboring Mafia Archipelago and its associated islets are parts of the Pwani Region in Mainland Tanzania.

== List of islands ==
=== Main islands ===
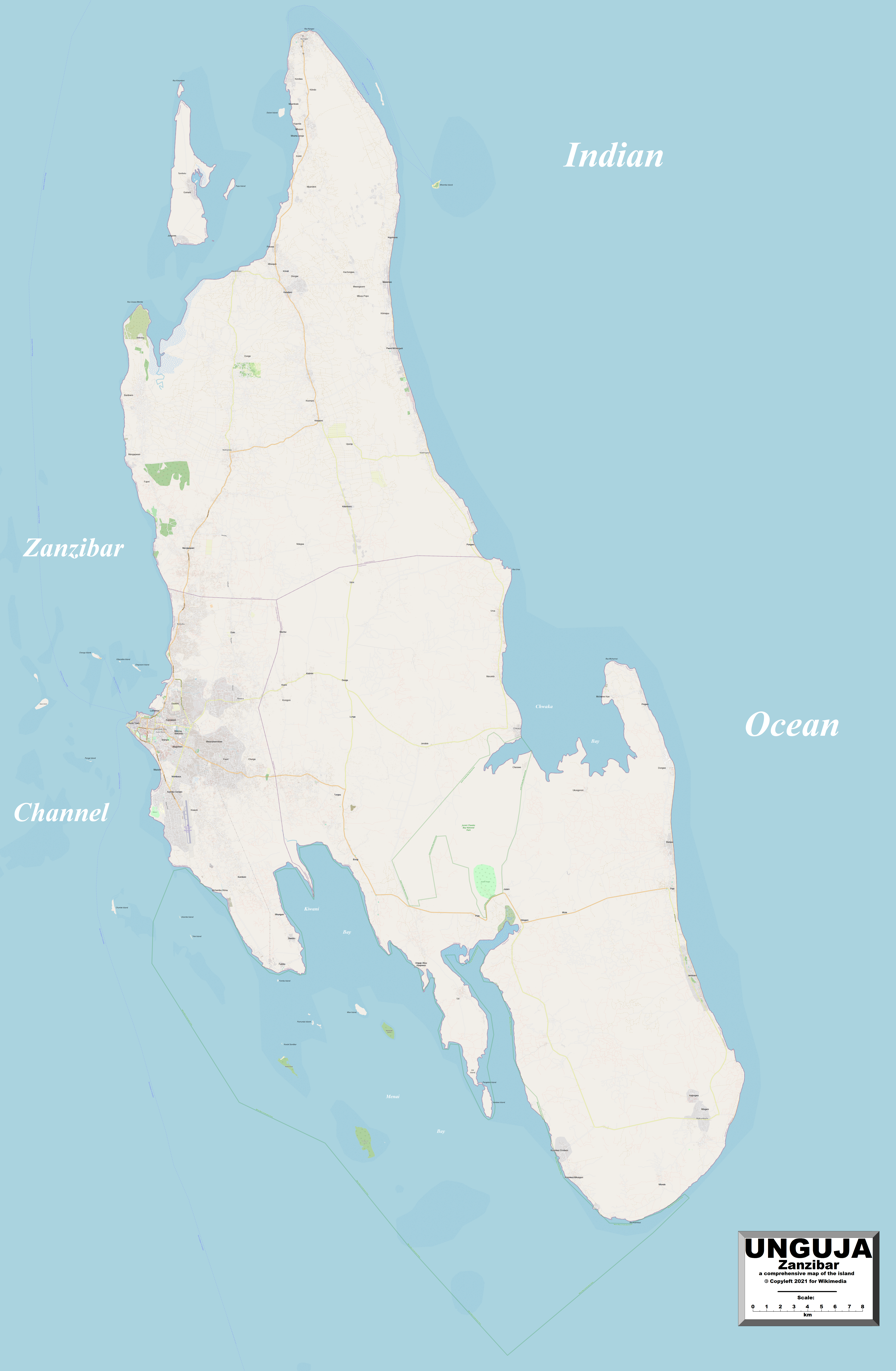
An enlargeable, detailed map of Unguja

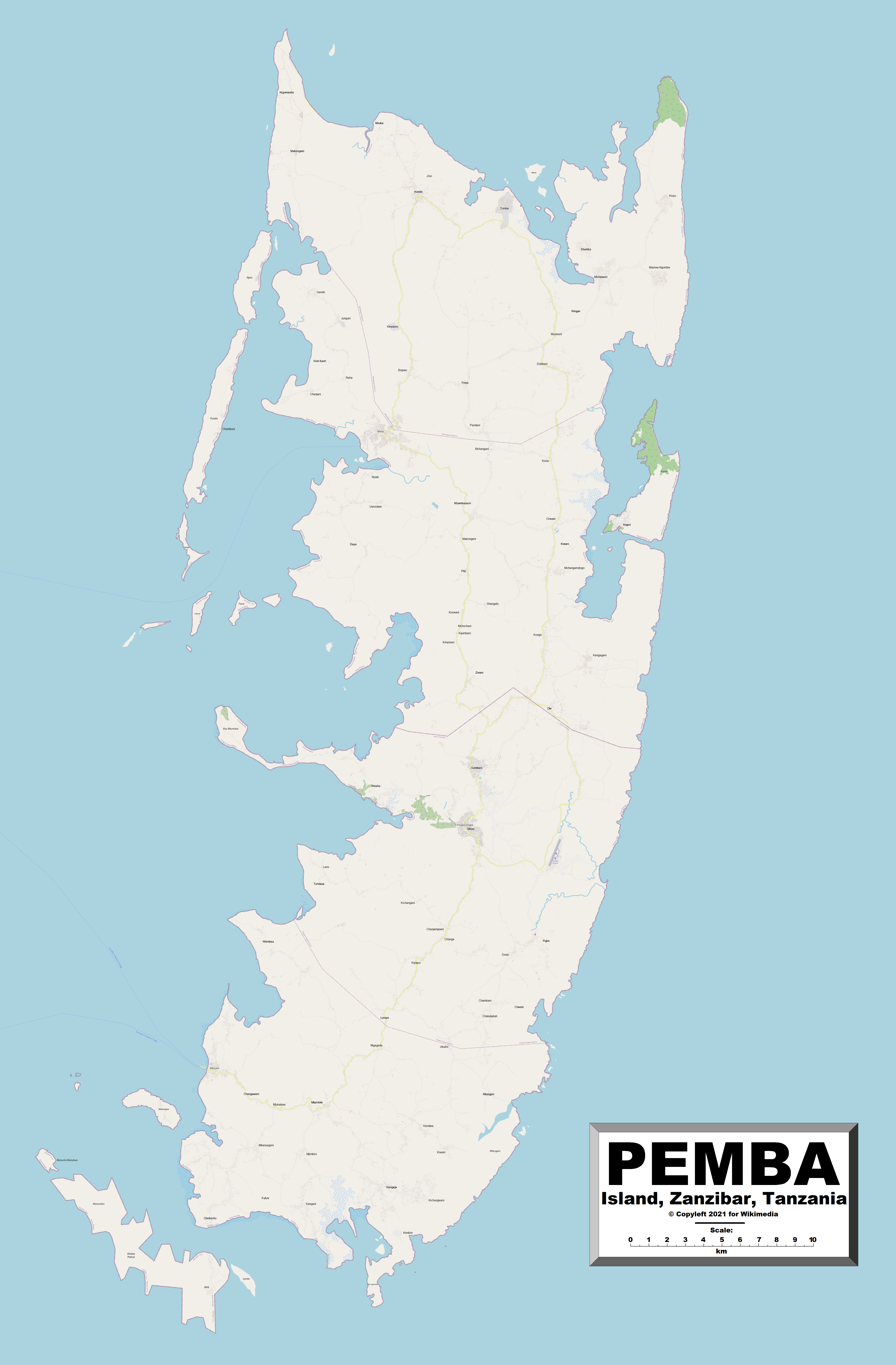
An enlargeable, detailed map of Pemba

- Unguja Island – the largest island, colloquially referred to as Zanzibar Island, has 896,721 inhabitants
- Pemba Island – the second-largest island with 406,808 inhabitants
- Mafia Island – the third-largest island with 66,180 inhabitants

=== Surrounding Unguja Island ===
- Bawe Island
- Changuu Island
- Chapwani Island
- Chumbe Island
- Daloni Island
- Kwale Island, Zanzibar
- Miwi Island
- Mnemba Island – settled
- Murogo Sand Banks
- Nyange Island
- Pange Island
- Popo Island
- Pungume Island
- Sume Island
- Tele Island
- Tumbatu Island – settled
- Ukombe Island
- Uzi Island – settled
- Vundwe Island

=== Surrounding Pemba Island ===
- Fundo Island – settled
- Funzi Island
- Jombe Island
- Kashani Island
- Kisiwa Hamisi
- Kisiwa Kamata
- Kisiwa Mbali
- Kisiwa N´gombe
- Kojani Island – settled
- Kokota Island – settled
- Kuji Island
- Kwata Islet
- Makoongwe Island – settled
- Matumbi Makubwa Island
- Matumbini Island
- Misali Island
- Njao Island
- Panani Island
- Panza Island – settled
- Shamiani Island – settled
- Sumtama Island
- Uvinje Island – settled
- Vikunguni Island

== See also ==
- Mainland Tanzania
