= Wete District =

District of Pemba North Region, Tanzania

Wete
- District
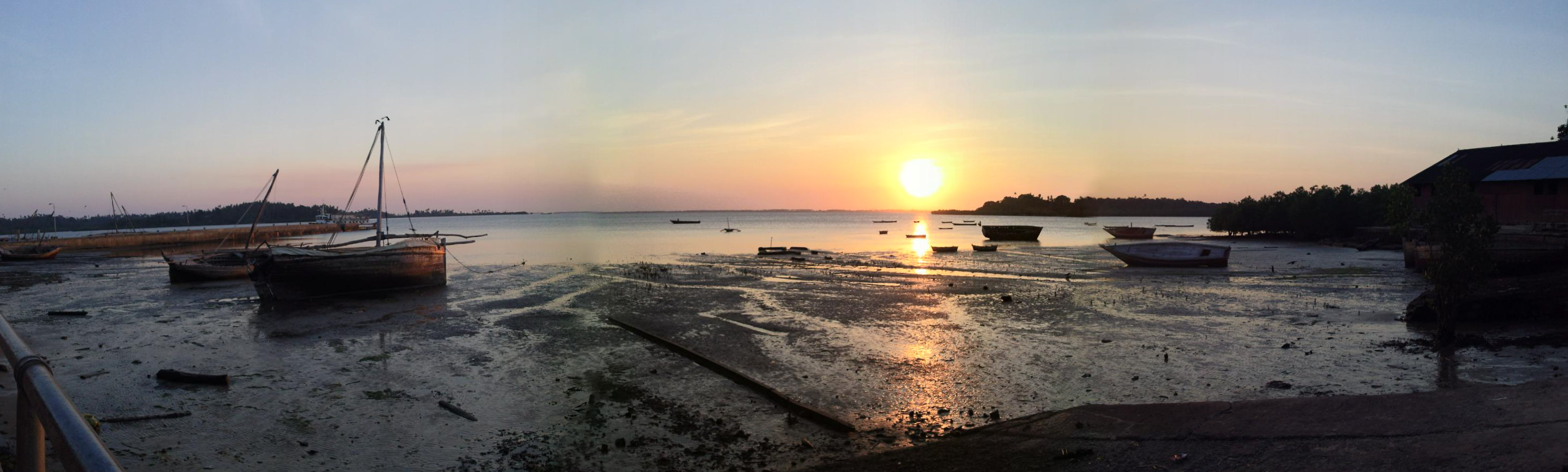
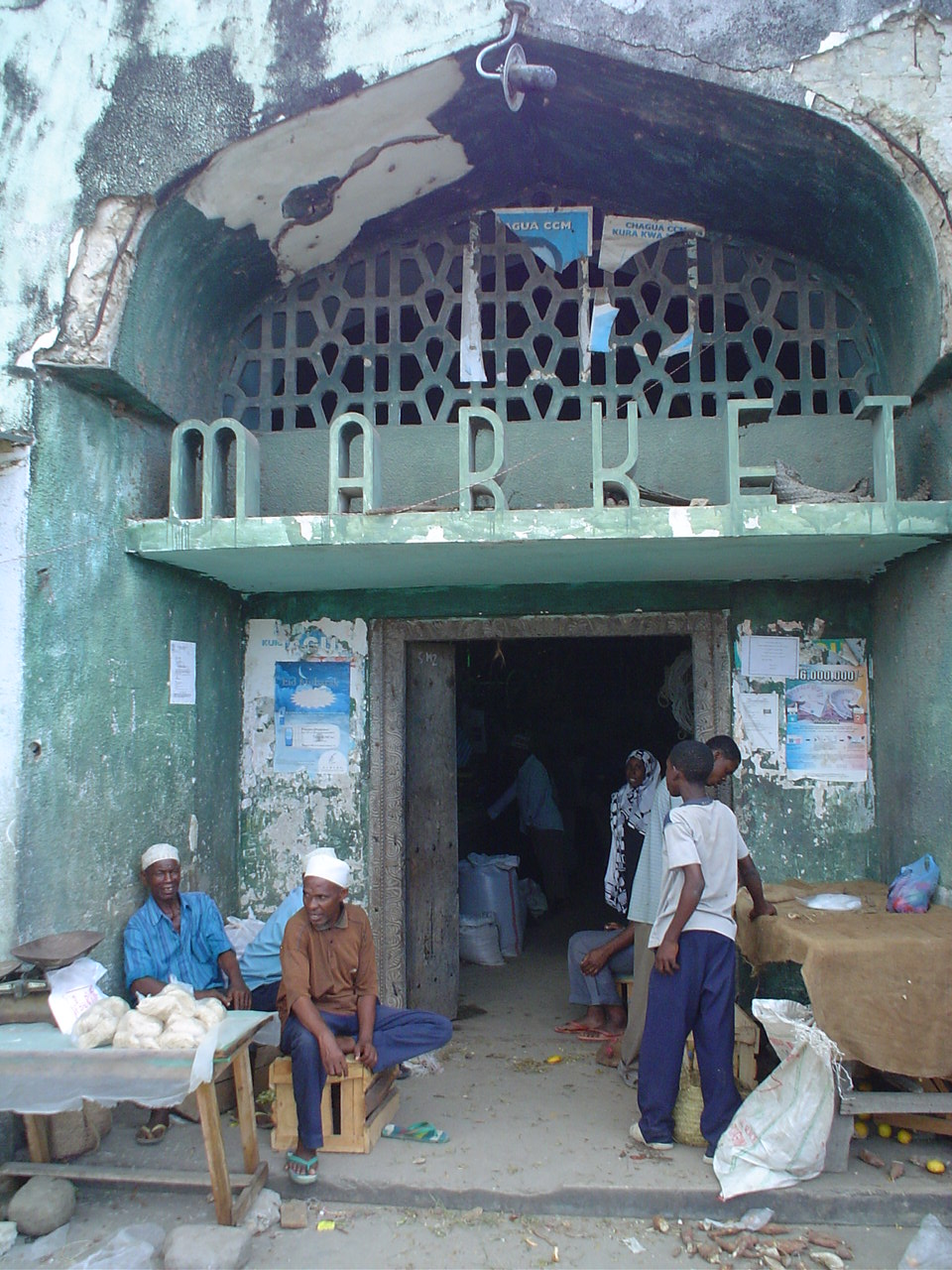
- From top to bottom: Wete harbor & Wete market in Wete District
- Nickname: the clove region
- Location in Pemba North
- Coordinates: 5°6′57.6″S 39°45′18″E
- Country: Tanzania
- Region: Pemba South Region
- Named for: Town of Wete
- Capital: Wete

Area
  - Total: 295 km^{2} (114 sq mi)
  - Rank: 1st in Pemba North

Population (2022)
  - Total: 148,712
  - Rank: 1st in Pemba North
  - Density: 504/km^{2} (1,310/sq mi)
- Demonym: Wetean

Ethnic groups
  - Settler: Swahili
  - Native: Hadimu

Wete District (Wilaya ya Wete in Swahili) is one of two administrative districts of Pemba North Region in Tanzania. The district covers an area of 295 km^{2} (114 sq mi). The district is comparable in size to the land area of Maldives. The district has a water border to the east and west by the Indian Ocean. The district is bordered to the north by Micheweni District. The district seat (capital) is the town of Wete. According to the 2022 census, the district has a total population of 148,712.

== Geography ==
Wete District is on Pemba Island and nearby islands in the Indian Ocean off the Pemba channel. The islands themselves are composed of sedimentary rocks deposited during the Neogene and Quaternary consisting of mostly limestones and sandstones with marls and some shale, as well as unconsolidated sands and clays. The sediments are nearly flat laying producing a gently undulating and rolling plain.

== Demographics ==
According to the 2012 population census, the Wete district has a total population of 107,916, which is equal to 8.3% of Zanzibar's total population.

== Economy ==
The main economic activity of Wete District is agriculture. A short rainy season called vuli, with planting taking place around October/December and harvesting occurring in late January/February, is experienced by the Wete district. A long rainy season called masika, with planting taking place in late February/March and harvesting occurring in July/August, immediately follows the vuli season. A variety of crops, including cloves, maize, sweet potatoes, cassava, rice, bananas, yams, and various vegetables, can be produced under these climatic conditions. Aquaculture is also a big in the region, between 2013 and 2015, 2,641,806 kg of seaweed were produced.

== Administrative subdivisions ==
The district commissioner's office and the LGA are both part of the Wete district. The district director is in charge of the latter, while the district commissioner (DC) and district administrative secretary (DAS) are in charge of the former. The office of the DC is a branch of the national government. Agriculture, health, education, planning, forestry, sports and culture, livestock, fishing, social welfare, water, construction, and nutrition are among the 12 departments that make up the DC's office.

=== Constituencies ===
For parliamentary elections, Tanzania is divided into constituencies. As of the 2010 elections Wete District had five constituencies:

- Gando Constituency
- Kojani Constituency
- Mtambwe Constituency
- Ole Constituency
- Wete Constituency

=== Wards ===
Wete District is administratively divided into seventeen wards:

1. Bopwe
2. Fundo
3. Gando
4. Jadida
5. Kangagani
6. Kipangani
7. Kisiwani
8. Kizimbani
9. Kojani

1. Limbani
2. Mchanga Mdogo
3. Mtambwe
4. Ole
5. Pandani
6. Selemu
7. Shengejuu
8. Utaani

== Education ==
In the 2002 census literacy in Micheweni District stood at 40 percent for those aged 5 years and above. Literacy in Swahili was 30 percent, while 19 percent were literate in English, with 9 percent overlap. As of 2018, there were a total of 26 high schools, 34 primary schools, and 22 pre-primary schools in the district. There Were 19 separate public health facility units in the Wete district (PHCUs). 14 of them are within the category of first-tier public health facilities. Second-line services are provided by the remaining four PHCUs. Additionally, the district has two PHCC in the Vitongoji neighborhood and one district hospital at Micheweni Hospital. Two of these healthcare institutions are run by the private sector, and the rest are owned by the government and parastatals.
