= Pemba North Region =

Region of Tanzania

Pemba North Region Mkoa wa Pemba Kaskazini (Swahili)
- Region
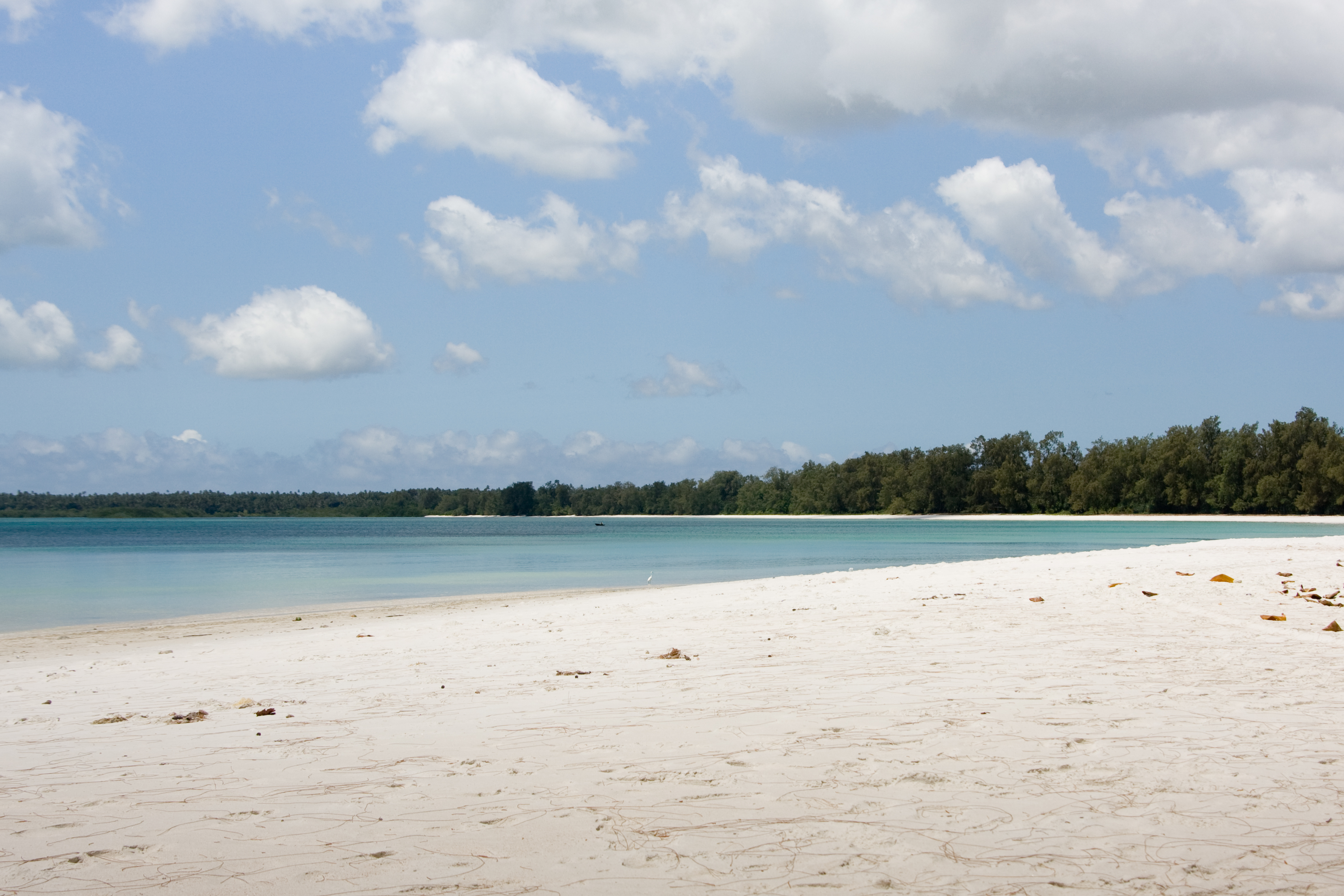
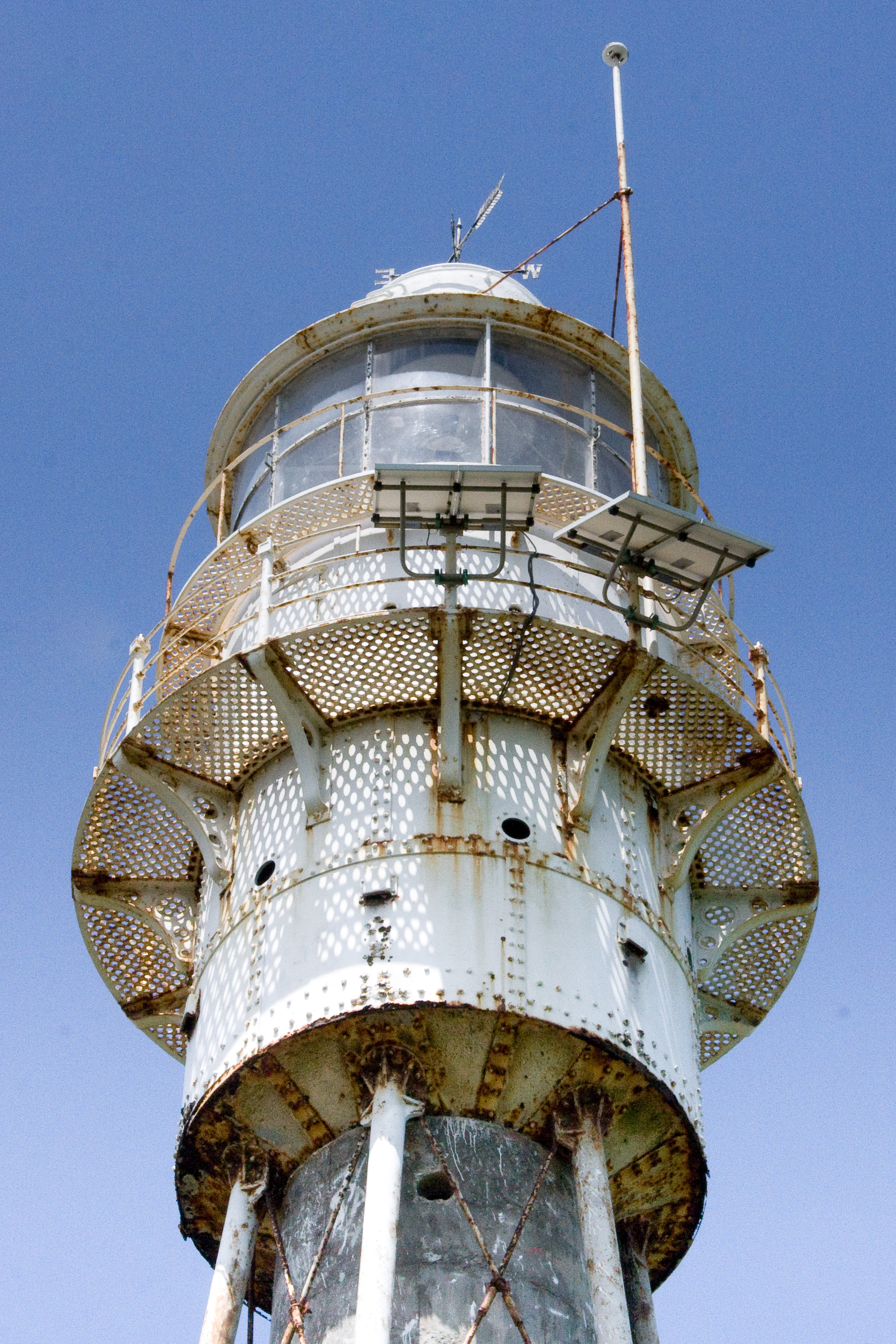
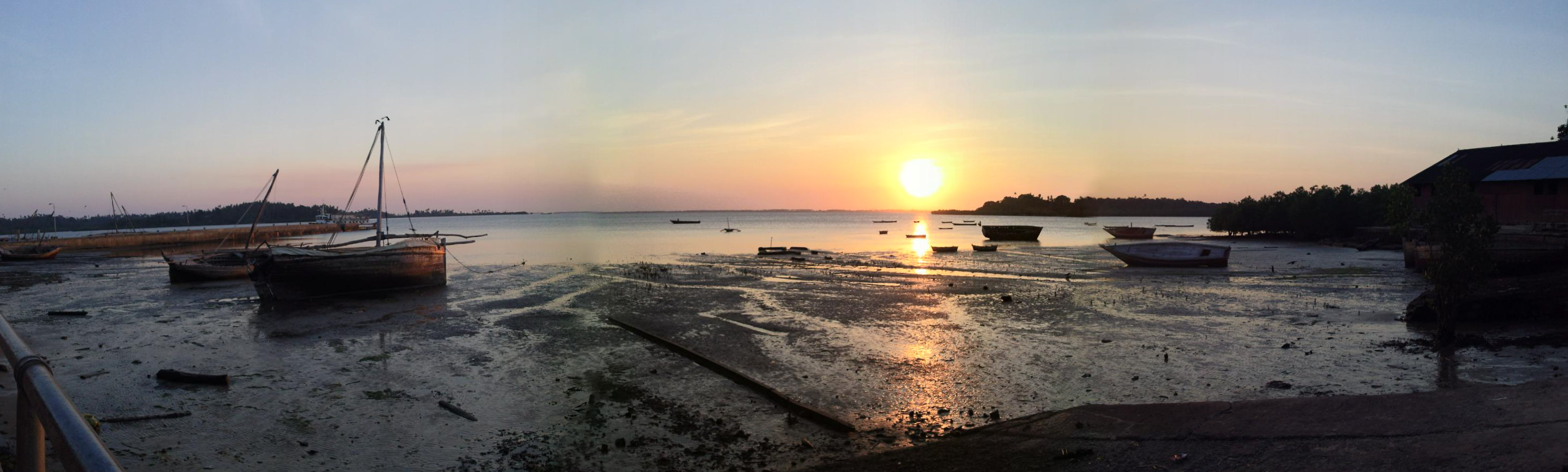
- From top to bottom: Vumawimbi Beach, Lighthouse in North Pemba and Wete Harbor
- Nickname: Emerald of Tanzania
- Location in Tanzania
- Coordinates: 5°1′54.84″S 39°46′32.16″E
- Country: Tanzania
- Named for: Pemba Island
- Capital: Wete
- Districts: List: Micheweni District; Wete District

Area
  - Total: 574 km^{2} (222 sq mi)
  - Rank: 28th of 31
- Highest elevation (Kidichi): 96 m (315 ft)

Population (2012)
  - Total: 211,732
  - Rank: 28th of 31
  - Density: 369/km^{2} (955/sq mi)
- Demonym: North Pemban

Ethnic groups
  - Settler: Swahili
  - Native: Hadimu
- Time zone: UTC+3 (EAT)
- Postcode: 75xxx
- Area code: 024
- ISO 3166 code: TZ-06
- HDI (2021): 0.548 low · 10th
- Website: Official website
- Symbols of Tanzania
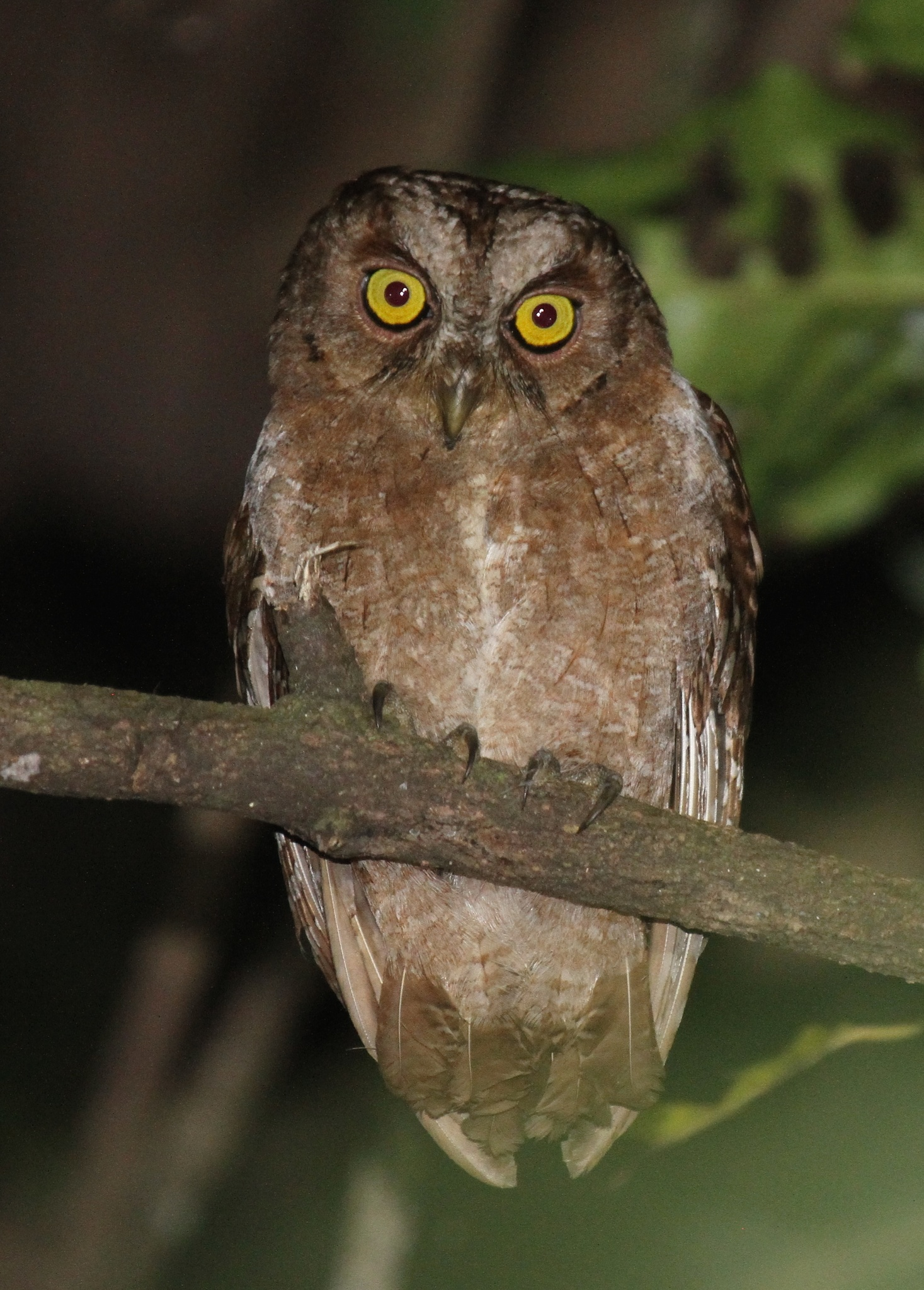
- Bird: Pemba scops owl

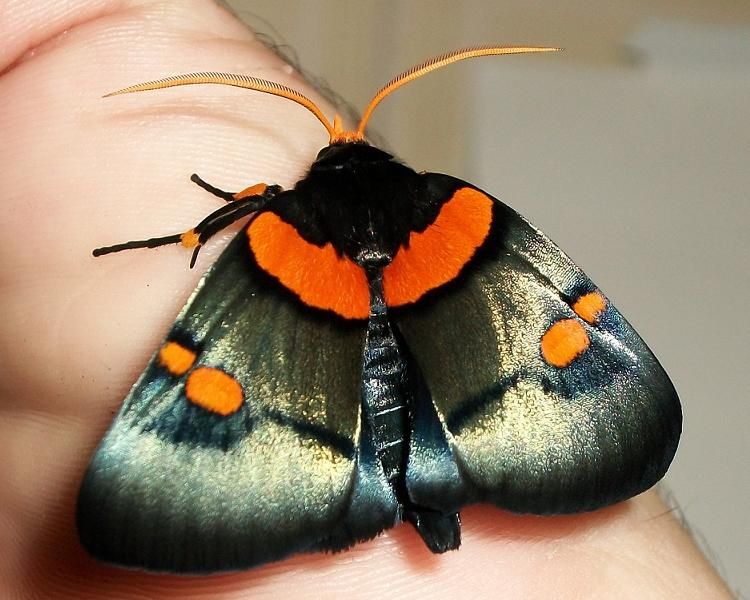
- Butterfly: African peach moth

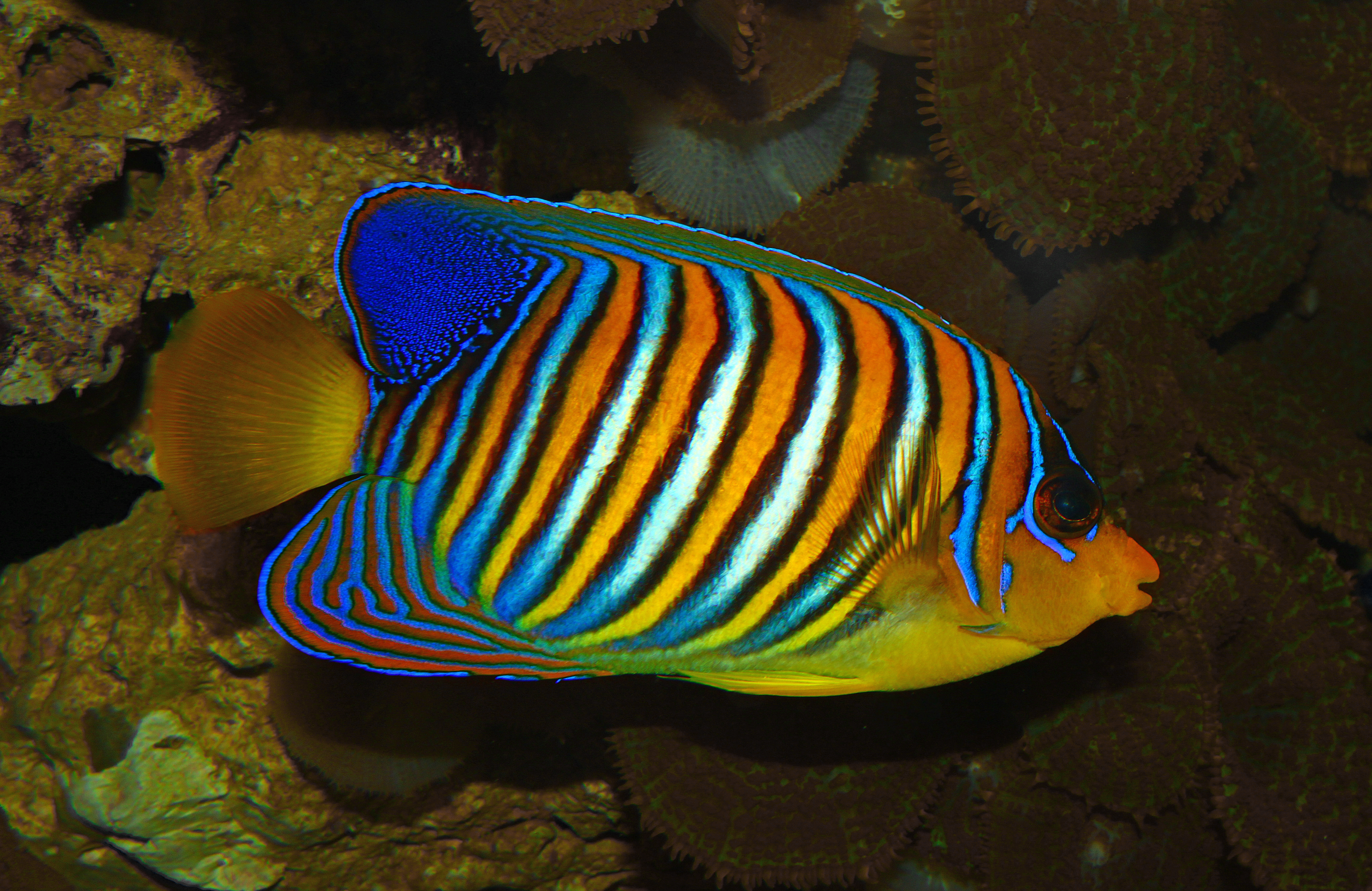
- Fish: Regal angelfish
- Mammal: Bakari's bat
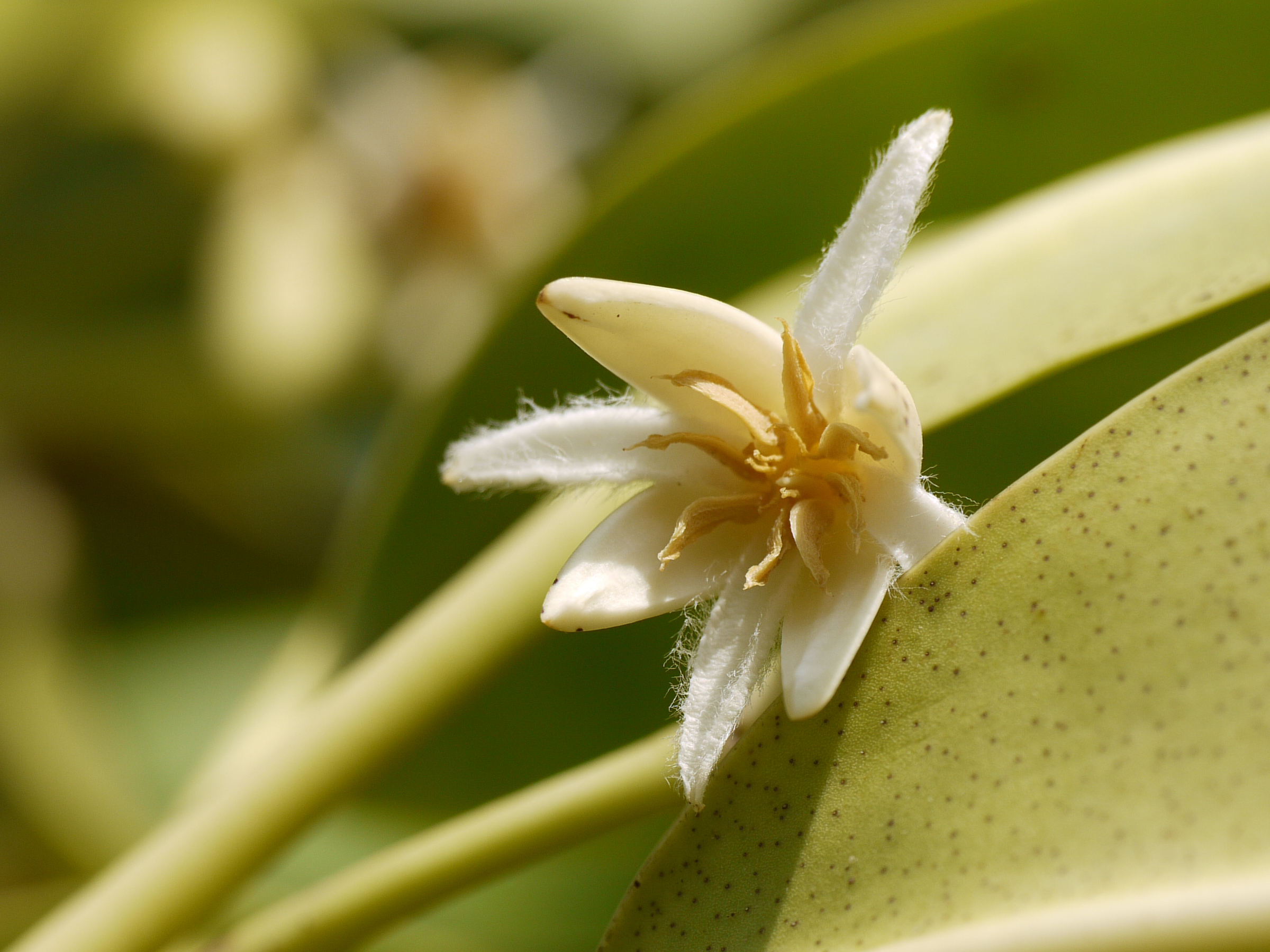
- Tree: Red mangrove

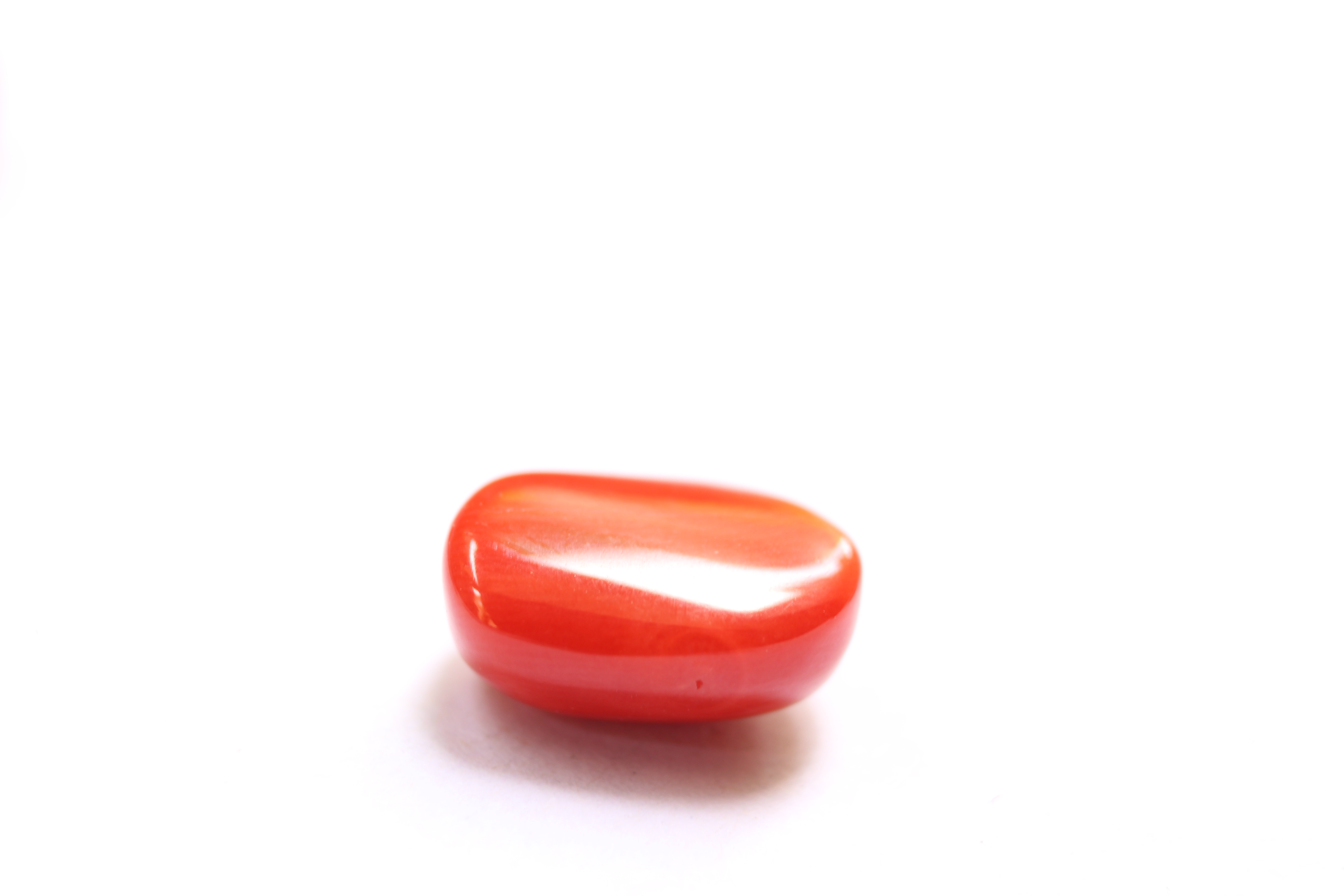
- Mineral: Coral

Pemba North Region or North Pemba Region (Swahili: Mkoa wa Pemba Kaskazini) is one of the 31 regions of Tanzania. The region covers an area of 574 km^{2} (222 sq mi). The administrative region is located entirely on the island of Pemba. Pemba North Region is bordered to the north by the Indian Ocean, south by the Pemba South Region and the west by the Pemba Channel. The regional capital is Wete. According to the 2012 census, the region has a total population of 211,732.

== Administrative divisions ==
=== Districts ===
Pemba North Region is divided into two districts, each administered by a council:

Districts of Pemba North Region
Map	District	Population (2012)
	Micheweni	103,816
	Wete	107,916
	Total	211,732
