= Pemba South Region =

Region of Tanzania

Pemba South Region Mkoa wa Pemba Kusini (Swahili)
- Region
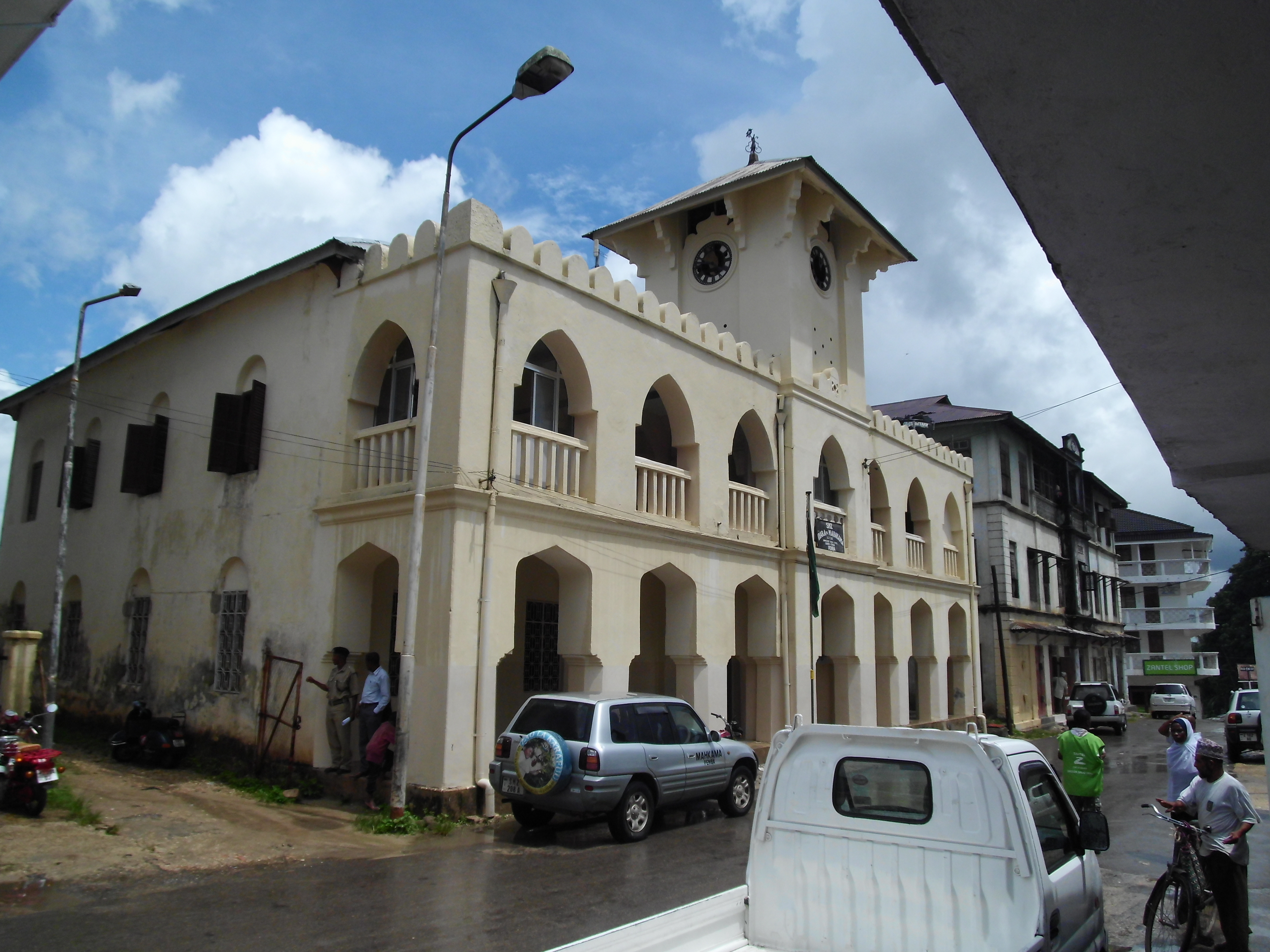
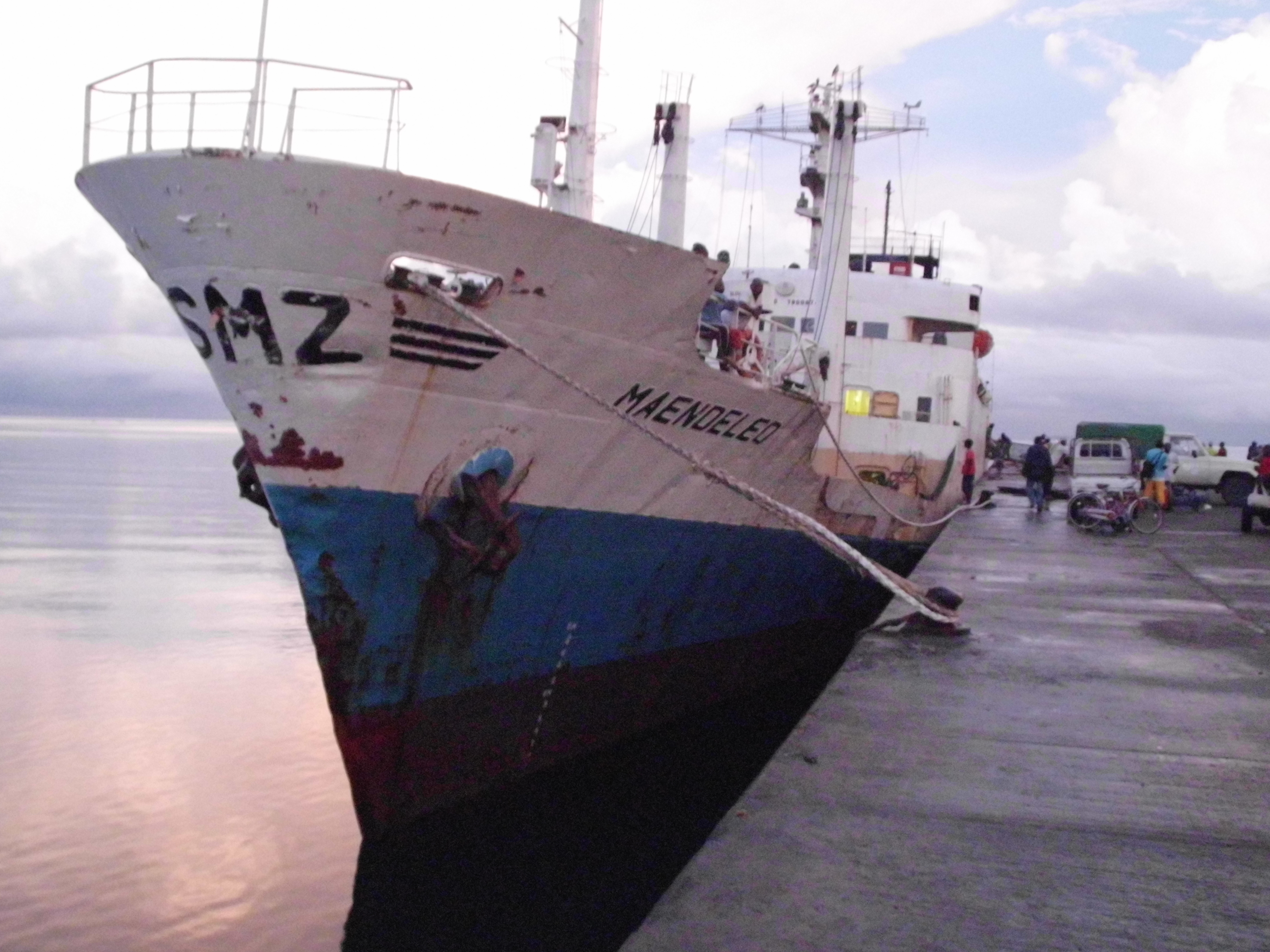
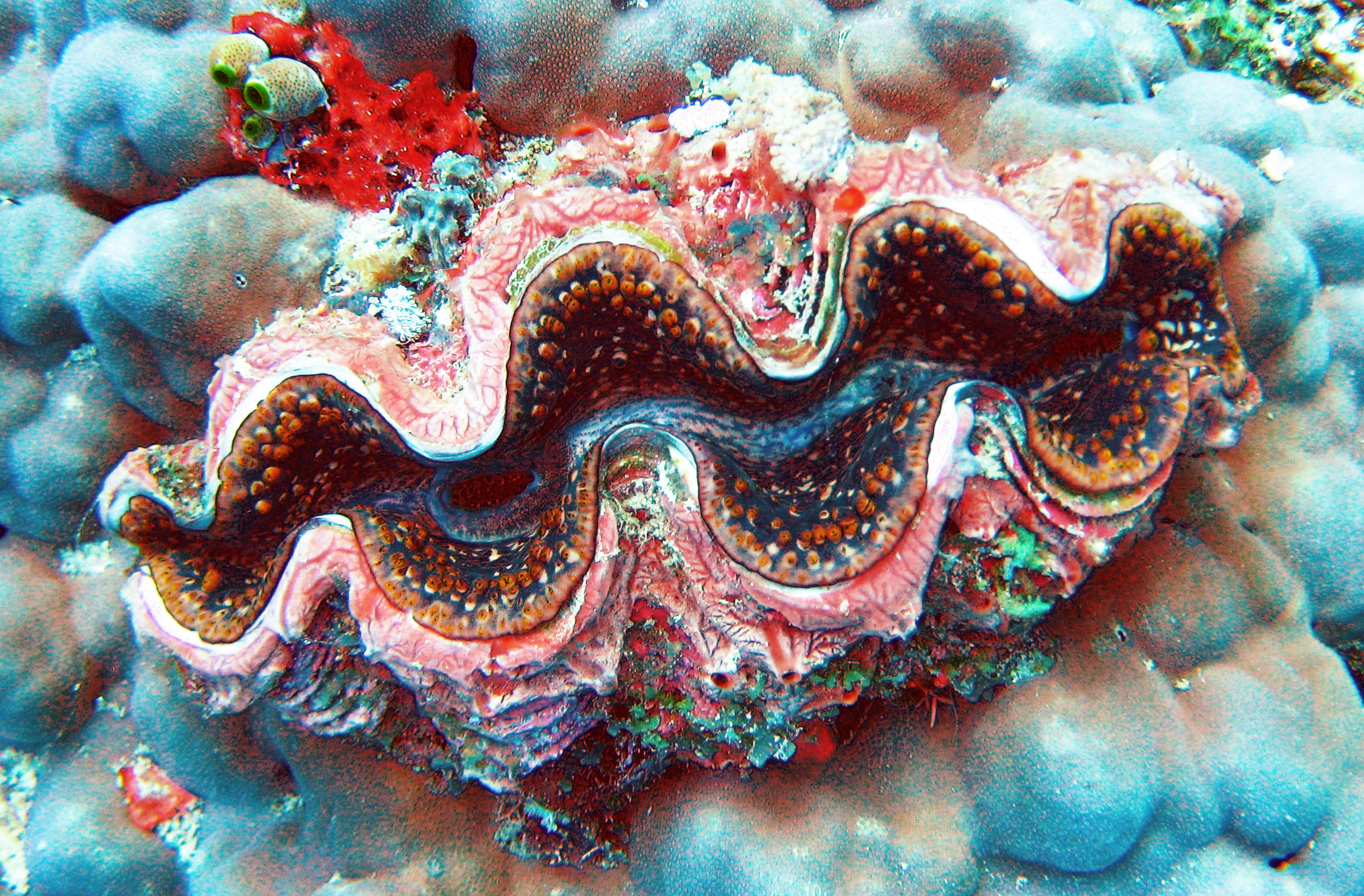
- From top to bottom: Chake Chake Court House, Zanzibari ship docked at Mkoani harbor, South Pemba & Giant clam in South Pemba waters
- Nickname: Tanzania's Coral Region
- Location in Tanzania
- Coordinates: 5°18′52.92″S 39°46′32.16″E
- Country: Tanzania
- Named for: Pemba Island
- Capital: Mkoani
- Districts: List: Mkoani District; Chake Chake District

Area
  - Total: 332 km^{2} (128 sq mi)
  - Rank: 29th of 31
- Highest elevation (Chamgindo): 78 m (256 ft)

Population (2022)
  - Total: 271,350
  - Rank: 28th of 31
  - Density: 817/km^{2} (2,120/sq mi)
- Demonym: South Pemban

Ethnic groups
  - Settler: Swahili
  - Native: Hadimu
- Time zone: UTC+3 (EAT)
- Postcode: 74xxx
- Area code: 024
- ISO 3166 code: TZ-10
- HDI (2021): 0.603 medium · 5th of 25
- Website: Official website
- Symbols of Tanzania
- Bird: Pemba green pigeon
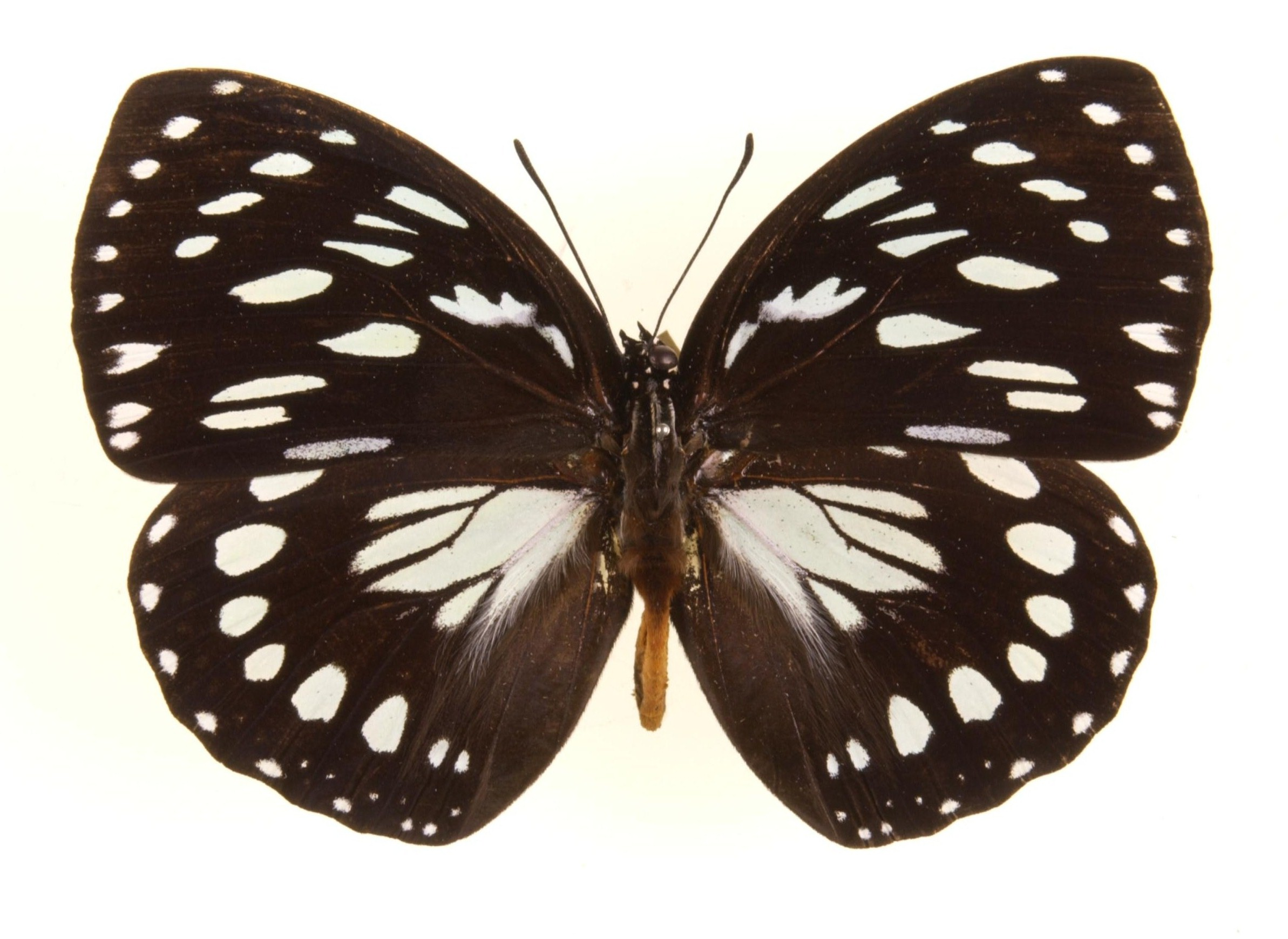
- Butterfly: Forest queen

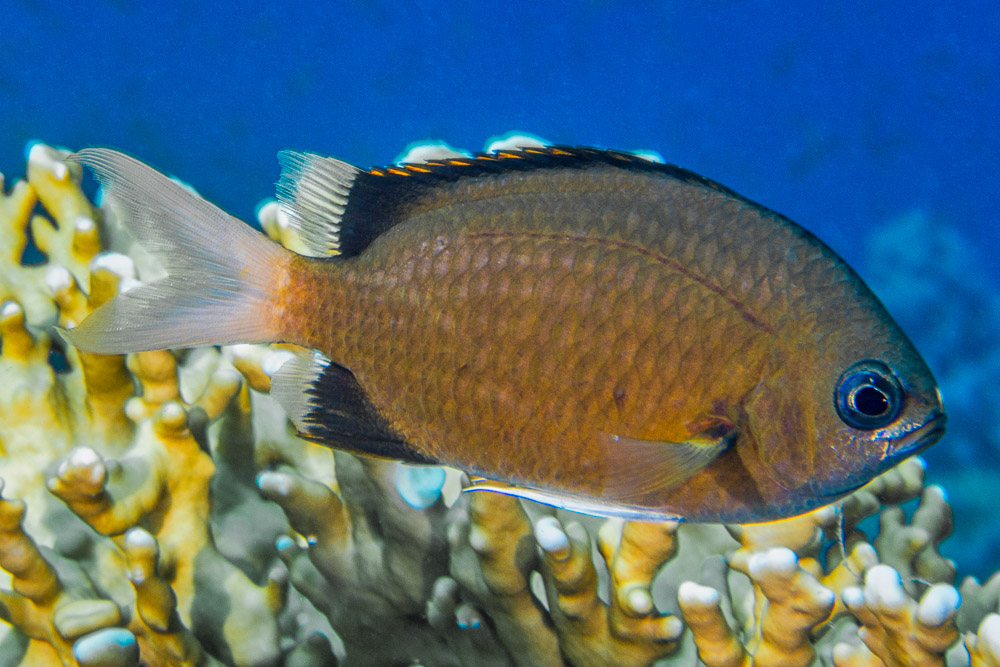
- Fish: Pemba Chromis

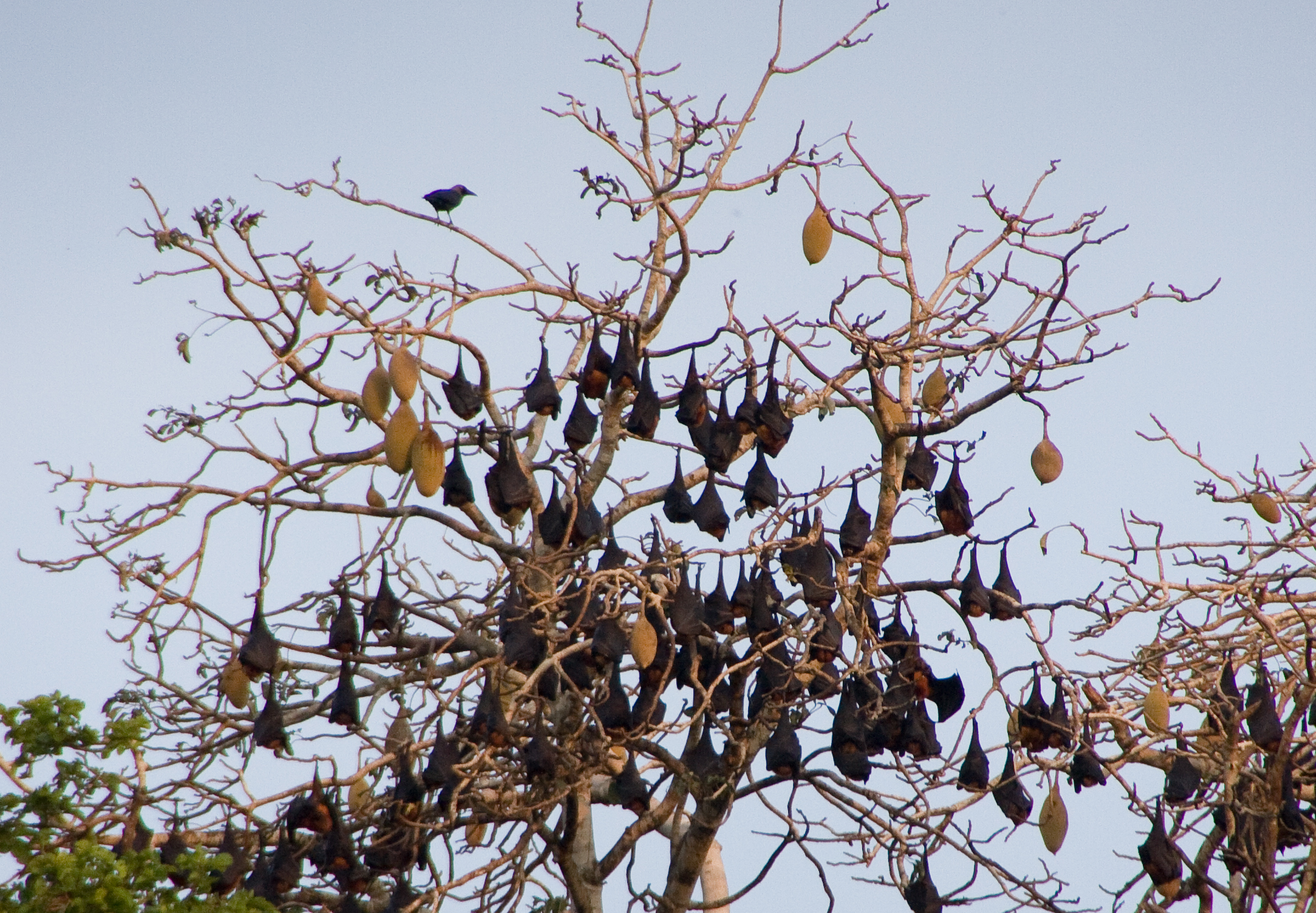
- Mammal: Pemba flying fox

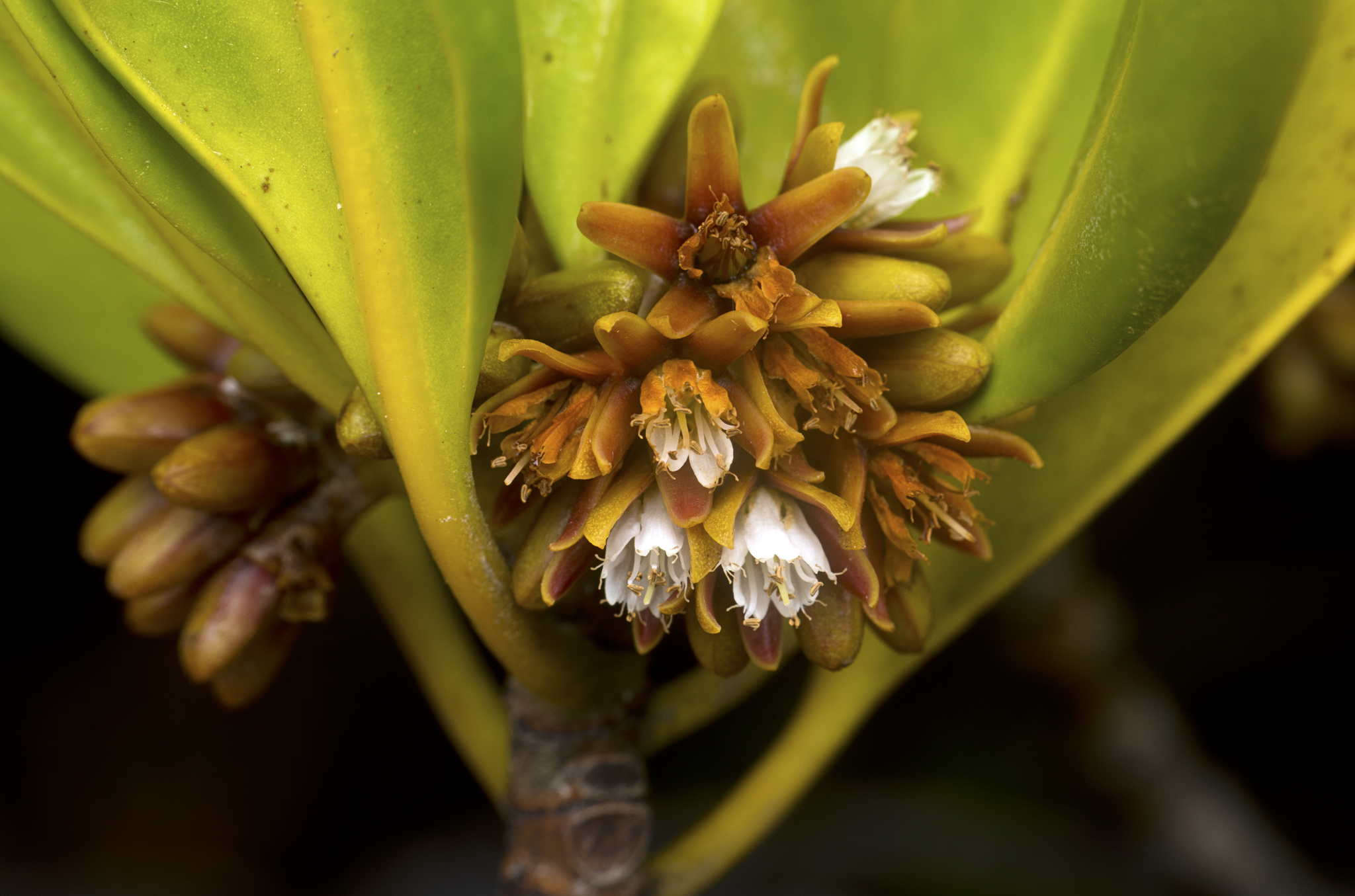
- Tree: Yellow mangrove

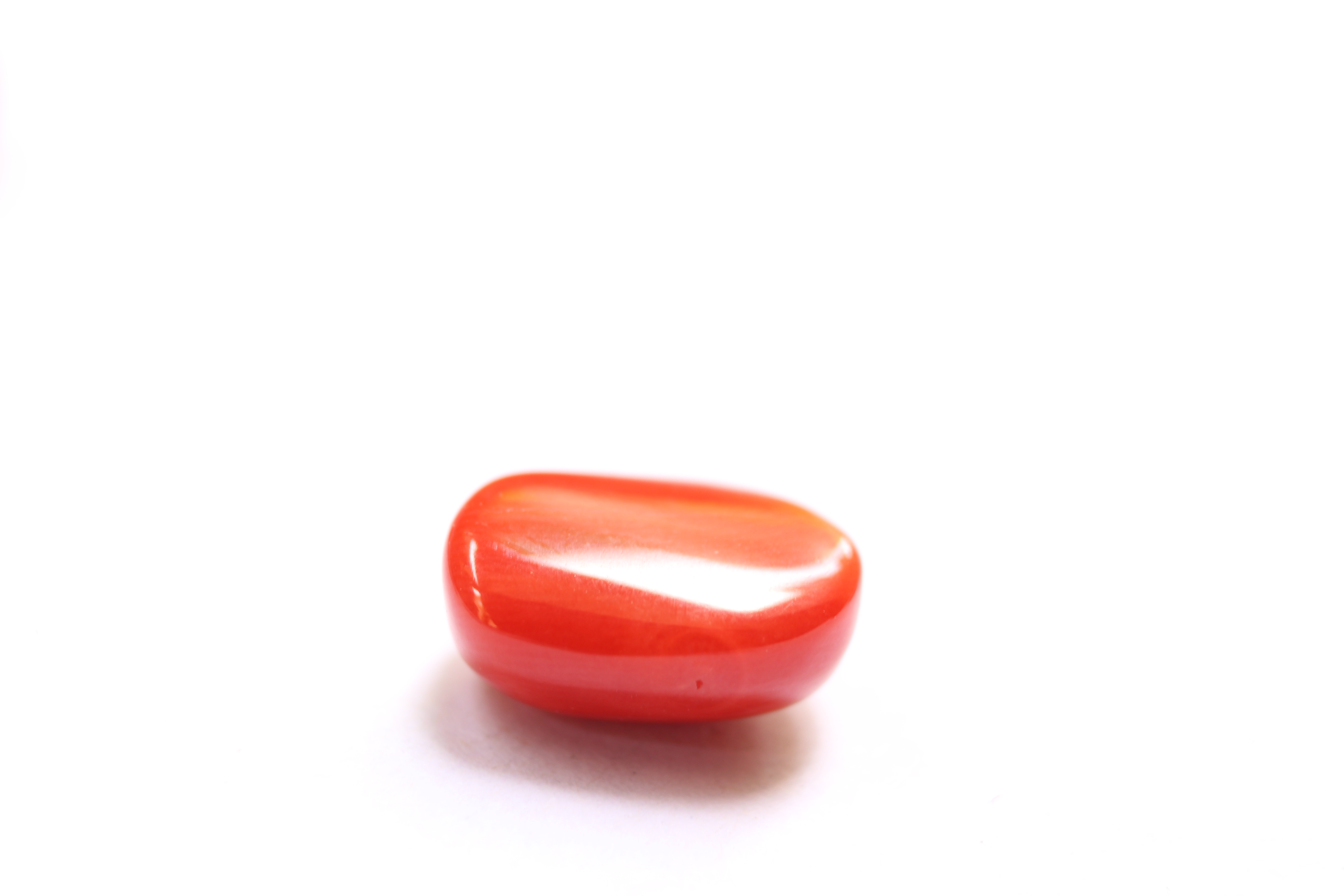
- Mineral: Coral

Pemba South Region or South Pemba Region (Swahili: Mkoa wa Pemba Kusini) is one of the 31 regions of Tanzania, covering an area of 332 km^{2} (128 sq mi). The region is comparable in size to the combined land area of the nation-state of Grenada. The administrative region is located entirely on Pemba island. Pemba South Region is bordered to the south by Indian Ocean, north by Pemba North Region and the west by the Pemba Channel. The regional capital is Chake-Chake. The region has the fifth-highest HDI in the country, making one of the most developed regions in the country. The region has the highest standard of living on Pemba Island. According to the 2022 census, the region has a total population of 271,350.

== Administrative divisions ==
=== Districts ===
Pemba South Region is divided into two districts, each administered by a council:

Districts of Pemba South Region
Map	District	Population (2022)
	Chake Chake	136,298
	Mkoani	135,052
	Total	271,350
