= Hadimu =

Ethnic group native to the Zanzibar archipelago

Wahadimu

Regions with significant populations
- Tanzania Pemba North Region, Pemba South Region, Unguja North Region, Mjini Magharibi Region, Unguja South Region (Wete District), (Micheweni District), (Kati District), (Kusini District), (Kaskazini A District), (Mjini District) & (Kaskazini B District)

Languages
- Kihadimu & Swahili

Religion
- Islam; African Traditional Religion

Related ethnic groups
- Bondei people, Zaramo people, Zigula people & other Bantu peoples

- Person: Muhadimu
- People: Wahadimu
- Language: Kihadimu

The Hadimu (Wahadimu, in Swahili) are a Bantu ethnic and linguistic group native to the islands of Zanzibar and Pemba Island of Tanzania.

== History ==
Their name's usage is a Swahili translation of the Arabic word "Khadim," which means "a servant," with the Bantu prefixes Mhadimu for the singular and Wahadimu for the plural. Their real name is unknown. They are fishermen and farmers who live in the island's inner settlements who, until recently (early 20th century), spoke their own unique language called Kihadimu. In addition to their tribal heritage, there are numerous other signs suggesting they originated on the mainland; nonetheless, their chiefs, whose line died out around 1870, appear to have been of Persian descent, similar to those of Kilwa, Vumba, Shake (near Kipini), and maybe other Medieval Swahili communities. These chiefs, whose names were Mwinyi Mkuu, resided in the now abandoned Dunga palace.

=== Origins ===
A Hadimu man by the name of Mwenyiuzi claimed that the Wahadimu originally hailed from the seashore close to the town of Windi (between Saadani and Bagamoyo) both in present-day Pwani Region. Since, they were fishermen by trade. A major storm one day drove them to Zanzibar Island's west shore. After finding it to be a beautiful land, they made Shangani their home along this stretch of coast. The word "Shangani" (which still refers to a specific area in Zanzibar Town) means "the place of sand." After that, they returned to the mainland to find spouses.

Ali, one of these first Hadimu settlers, had fifteen children, among them Ibrahimu, Mtakata, Shangwana, Mtekwa, Mduvi, Mdonge, Seramala, and Kitama Ali, as well as the females Kasija, Mwatuna, and Mwana wa Mwana. Seramali Ali is the ancestor of Mwenyiuzi. According to another source, the Wahadimu summoned Sayidi Hariri an Omani officer for assistance after the Portuguese seized Hadimu women against their will and forced them to become concubines. When Sayidi Hariri requested the Wahadimu for pay, they said, "Rule over us - sisi ni Wahadimu wako (we are thy servants)," driving away the Wareno (Portuguese) from both Zanzibar and Muscat.

== Language ==
As of the early 1900s, the majority of Wahadimu spoke Swahili, albeit with an odd accent that is most pronounced in the "curious sing-song" intonation of their greetings. The U.M.C.A. teacher from Dunga who was initially given the task "did his best, but could only get the words supplied to him as Kihadimu because of how poorly he could speak Swahili". A doctor stationed at the same location tried speaking in Swahili with three Wahadimu patients who were admitted to the hospital from far-off shambas(farms), but the same thing happened: "they were completely ignorant of their tribal history and only knew a few stray words of their language".

== Spirituality ==
A now extinct spirit possession cult existed among 19th-century Hadimu women revering a spirit called kitimiri. This cult was described in an 1869 account by a French missionary. The cult faded by the 1920s and was virtually unknown by the 1960s.
