= Zanzibar Channel =

Strait in Tanzania

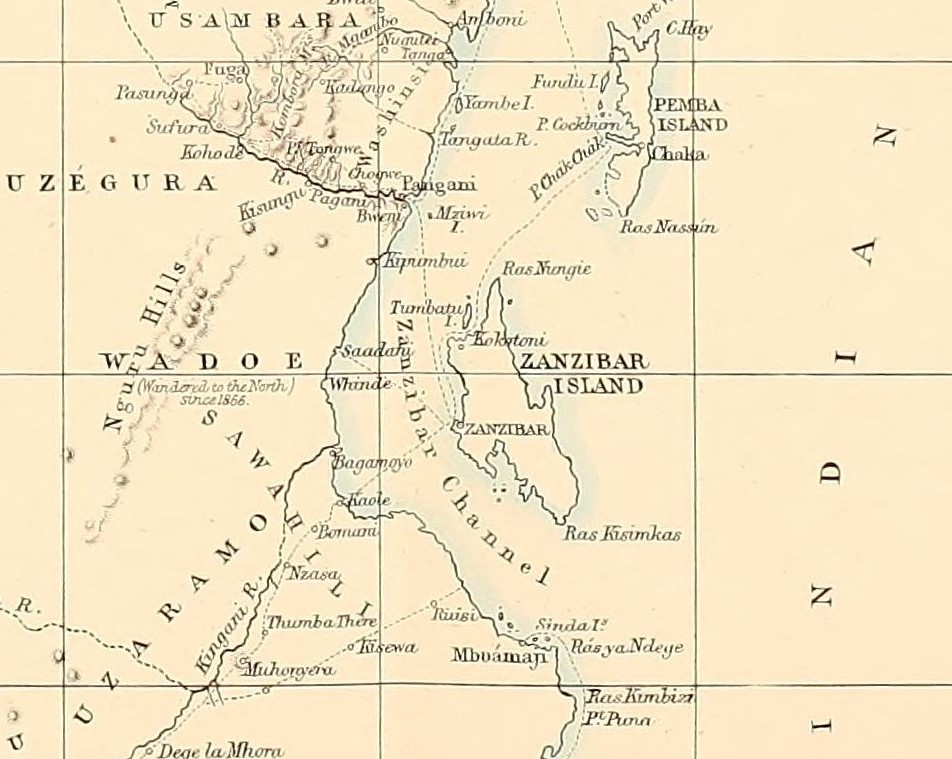
- The Zanzibar Channel in an 1872 map

- Location within Tanzania Location within Africa
- Coordinates: 06°00′S 39°00′E
- Ocean/sea sources: Indian Ocean
- Basin countries: Tanzania
- Max. length: 110 km (68 mi)
- Max. width: 37 km (23 mi)
- Islands: Unguja (Zanzibar)

The Zanzibar Channel is a strait in south-eastern Africa, separating the island of Unguja (also known as Zanzibar) from mainland Tanzania. The channel is 120 km long and 29–37 km wide, with depth varying from a few dozen metres (in the centre) to a few hundred metres to the north and to the south. The channel is entirely located in Tanzanian territorial waters. In ancient times the overall depth of the channel has been considerably smaller (about 120 m less during the last ice age).

The southern entrance to the Channel is indicated by a lighthouse located on the mainland coast on the Ras Kanzi promontory, 22 km south of Dar es Salaam.

== Swimming ==
In 2015, the 29 km solo swim across the Zanzibar Channel starting at the Pungume Sandbank was completed in 9 hrs 1 minute by Jean Craven (SA), Robert Dunford (Kenya), Megan Harrington Johnson (SA), Samantha Whelpton (SA) and Emil Berning (SA)
