= Matumbi Highlands =

Mountain range in Lindi and Pwani Regions of Tanzania

- Milima ya Wamatumbi (Swahili)

Highest point
- Elevation: 442 m (1,450 ft)
- Coordinates: 8°20′S 38°55′E

Geography
- Country: Tanzania
- Regions: Lindi Region and Pwani Region

The Matumbi Highlands or Matumbi Hills is a major highland of southern Tanzania, extending from southern Pwani Region to northern Kilwa District of Lindi Region. The Matumbi highlands are named after the peoples that were the original inhabitants of the area, the Matumbi people. The average elevation of the highlands is 442m. The highlands are located in Kibata, Kipatimu, Chumo, Kinjumbi and Mingumbi wards of Kilwa District. In Pwani Region the highlands are found in Mbwara and Chumbi wards. The highlands are the location of Nan'goma Cave system.

== Climate ==
The Matumbi Highlands in southern Tanzania feature a tropical highland climate. The area experiences warm temperatures year-round, with average daily highs ranging from 27 to 32 °C and lows between 13 and 19 °C, depending on the season.

The region has two main rainy seasons: a long rainy season from March to May and a short rainy season from October to December, while the dry season generally lasts from June to September. Annual rainfall averages around 800–1000 mm, varying locally with elevation and location.

The climate influences agricultural activities in the highlands, as local communities rely on rain-fed farming and livestock. Weather conditions during rainy and dry periods affect the timing of planting and harvesting.
