= Njenje River =

River in Lindi Region

Coordinates: 9°05′S 37°26′E

- Native name: Mto Njenje (Swahili)

Location
- Country: Tanzania

Physical characteristics
- Source
  - location: Nanjirinji, Kilwa District
- Mouth
  - location: Indian Ocean

Njenje River is a tributary of the Rufiji River that starts in Liwale District of Lindi Region, Tanzania. It begins in Lilombe ward and Joins the Rufiji on the border with Morogoro Region at Barikiwa ward. The river is located entirely in the Selous Game Reserve.
