= Battle of Rumbo =

- Part of the East African Campaign
Date	18 April 1917
Location	Rumbo (Kiranjeranje), German East Africa 9°32′09″S 39°20′06″E
Result	German victory

Belligerents
German Empire	British Empire: India

Commanders and leaders
(German Empire) Captain von Liebermann	(British Empire) Major William Thornton Gregg

Strength
Unknown	~420

Casualties and losses
Unknown	Unknown
- Location within Tanzania Battle of Rumbo (Africa)

The Battle of Rumbo was fought during the East African Campaign of World War I.

== The battle ==
After the successful Tabora offensive in autumn 1916, British and Belgian troops controlled a large part of German East Africa. However, after this battle, the remaining German troops under command of Paul von Lettow-Vorbeck switched to guerrilla warfare tactics, by which they achieved a number of victories in 1917 and 1918. The Battle of Rumbo was such a victory.

In April 1917, the British became aware of a German army detachment southwest of Kilwa. They sent the 40th Pathans Regiment and some units of the King's African Rifles and Gold Coast Regiments in two columns across the Ngaura River to defeat the Germans.
They found the Germans in a well-defended position and their attack was repulsed with significant losses. The Germans then launched a counterattack that forced both columns back across the river. Meanwhile, the river had swollen considerably from rainfall upstream, leading to further British losses in men and material.
