= Njinjo =

Ward in Kilwa District, Lindi Region

Njinjo Kata ya Njinjo (Swahili)
- Ward
- Kata ya Njinjo, Wilaya ya Kilwa
- Location within Tanzania
- Country: Tanzania
- Region: Lindi Region
- District: Kilwa District
- Seat: Njinjo Village

Area
  - Total: 414 km^{2} (160 sq mi)
- Elevation: 224 m (735 ft)

Population (2012)
  - Total: 8,094
  - Density: 19.6/km^{2} (50.6/sq mi)

Ethnic groups
  - Settler: Swahili
  - Native: Matumbi
- Tanzanian Postal Code: 65415

Njinjo is an administrative ward in Kilwa District of Lindi Region in Tanzania. The ward covers an area of 414 km^{2} (160 sq mi), and has an average elevation of 149 m (489 ft). According to the 2012 census, the ward has a total population of 8,094. The ward seat is Njinjo village.
