= Miguruwe =

Ward in Kilwa District, Lindi Region

Miguruwe Kata ya Miguruwe (Swahili)
- Ward
- Kata ya Miguruwe, Wilaya ya Kilwa
- Location within Tanzania
- Country: Tanzania
- Region: Lindi Region
- District: Kilwa District
- Seat: Zinga Miguruwe Village

Area
  - Total: 1,839 km^{2} (710 sq mi)
- Elevation: 291 m (955 ft)

Population (2012)
  - Total: 3,381
  - Density: 1.838/km^{2} (4.762/sq mi)

Ethnic groups
  - Settler: Swahili
  - Native: Matumbi
- Tanzanian Postal Code: 65416

Miguruwe is an administrative ward in Kilwa District of Lindi Region in Tanzania. The ward covers an area of 1,839 km^{2} (710 sq mi), and has an average elevation of 156 m (512 ft). According to the 2012 census, the ward has a total population of 3,381. The ward seat is Zinga Miguruwe village.
