= Kikole =

Ward in Kilwa District, Lindi Region

Kikole Kata ya Kikole (Swahili)
- Ward
- Kata ya Kikole, Wilaya ya Kilwa
- Location within Tanzania
- Country: Tanzania
- Region: Lindi Region
- District: Kilwa District
- Seat: Kikole Village

Area
  - Total: 807.3 km^{2} (311.7 sq mi)
- Elevation: 85 m (279 ft)

Population (2012)
  - Total: 4,294
  - Density: 5.319/km^{2} (13.78/sq mi)

Ethnic groups
  - Settler: Swahili
  - Native: Matumbi
- Tanzanian Postal Code: 65407

Kikole is an administrative ward in Kilwa District of Lindi Region in Tanzania. The ward covers an area of 807.3 km^{2} (311.7 sq mi), and has an average elevation of 85 m (279 ft). According to the 2012 census, the ward has a total population of 4,294. The ward seat is Kikole village.
