= Kandawale, Kilwa =

Ward in Kilwa District, Lindi Region

Kandawale Kata ya Kandawale (Swahili)
- Ward
- Kata ya Kandawale, Wilaya ya Kilwa
- Location within Tanzania
- Country: Tanzania
- Region: Lindi Region
- District: Kilwa District
- Seat: Kandawale Village

Area
  - Total: 777.5 km^{2} (300.2 sq mi)
- Elevation: 218 m (715 ft)

Population (2012)
  - Total: 5,040
  - Density: 6.48/km^{2} (16.8/sq mi)

Ethnic groups
  - Settler: Swahili
  - Native: Matumbi
- Tanzanian Postal Code: 65417

Kandawale is an administrative ward in Kilwa District of Lindi Region in Tanzania. The ward covers an area of 777.5 km^{2} (300.2 sq mi), and has an average elevation of 218 m (715 ft). According to the 2012 census, the ward has a total population of 5,040. The ward seat is Kandawale village.
