= Lihimalyao =

Ward in Kilwa District, Lindi Region

Lihimalyao Kata ya Lihimalyao (Swahili)
- Ward
- Kata ya Lihimalyao, Wilaya ya Kilwa
- Location within Tanzania
- Country: Tanzania
- Region: Lindi Region
- District: Kilwa District
- Seat: Lihilmalyao Village

Area
  - Total: 360.4 km^{2} (139.2 sq mi)
- Elevation: 39 m (128 ft)

Population (2022)
  - Total: 13,767
  - Density: 38.20/km^{2} (98.94/sq mi)

Ethnic groups
  - Settler: Swahili
  - Native: Machinga
- Tanzanian Postal Code: 65410

Lihimalyao is an administrative ward in Kilwa District of Lindi Region in Tanzania. The ward covers an area of 360.4 km^{2} (139.2 sq mi), and has an average elevation of 39 m (128 ft). According to the 2022 census, the ward has a total population of 13,767. The ward seat is Lihimalyao village. Lihilmalyao ward is also the mouth of Lindi's largest and longest river, the Mbwemkuru River.
