= Miteja =

Ward in Kilwa District, Lindi Region

Miteja Kata ya Miteja (Swahili)
- Ward
- Kata ya Miteja, Wilaya ya Kilwa
- Location within Tanzania
- Country: Tanzania
- Region: Lindi Region
- District: Kilwa District
- Seat: Miteja Village

Area
  - Total: 240 km^{2} (93 sq mi)
- Elevation: 18 m (59 ft)

Population (2012)
  - Total: 6,157
  - Density: 26/km^{2} (66/sq mi)

Ethnic groups
  - Settler: Swahili
  - Native: Matumbi
- Tanzanian Postal Code: 65403

Miteja is an administrative ward in Kilwa District of Lindi Region in Tanzania. The ward covers an area of 240 km^{2} (93 sq mi), and has an average elevation of 18 m (59 ft). According to the 2012 census, the ward has a total population of 6,157. The ward seat is Miteja village.
