= Matandu River =

River in Lindi Region

- Native name: Mto Matandu (Swahili)

Location
- Country: Tanzania

Physical characteristics
- Source
  - location: Mkutano, Liwale District
- Mouth
  - location: Indian Ocean
  - coordinates: 8°42′35″S 39°22′59″E

Matandu River is located in northern Lindi Region, Tanzania. It begins in Mkutano ward in Liwale District and drains into the Indian Ocean on the shore of Kilwa Kivinje ward in Kilwa District.The river is the second largest and longest river in Lindi region .
