= Mitole, Kilwa =

Ward in Kilwa District, Lindi Region

Mitole Kata ya Mitole (Swahili)
- Ward
- Kata ya Miteja, Wilaya ya Kilwa
- Location within Tanzania
- Country: Tanzania
- Region: Lindi Region
- District: Kilwa District
- Seat: Mitole Village

Area
  - Total: 432 km^{2} (167 sq mi)
- Elevation: 138 m (453 ft)

Population (2012)
  - Total: 3,352
  - Density: 7.76/km^{2} (20.1/sq mi)

Ethnic groups
  - Settler: Swahili
  - Native: Matumbi
- Tanzanian Postal Code: 65414

Mitole is an administrative ward in Kilwa District of Lindi Region in Tanzania. The ward covers an area of 432 km^{2} (167 sq mi), and has an average elevation of 138 m (453 ft). According to the 2012 census, the ward has a total population of 3,352. The ward seat is Mitole village.
