= Matumbi =

Matumbi may refer to:

- the Matumbi people
- the Matumbi language
- Matumbi (band)
- Matumbi (Madaba), ward in district Madaba Ruvuma region, Tanzania
