= Mandawa, Kilwa =

Ward in Kilwa District, Lindi Region

Mandawa Kata ya Mandawa (Swahili)
- Ward
- Kata ya Mandawa, Wilaya ya Kilwa
- Location within Tanzania
- Country: Tanzania
- Region: Lindi Region
- District: Kilwa District
- Seat: Mandawa Village

Area
  - Total: 1,599 km^{2} (617 sq mi)
- Elevation: 291 m (955 ft)

Population (2012)
  - Total: 13,192
  - Density: 8.250/km^{2} (21.37/sq mi)

Ethnic groups
  - Settler: Swahili
  - Native: Mwera
- Tanzanian Postal Code: 65408

Mandawa is an administrative ward in Kilwa District of Lindi Region in Tanzania. The ward covers an area of 1,599 km^{2} (617 sq mi), and has an average elevation of 291 m (955 ft). According to the 2012 census, the ward has a total population of 13,192. The ward seat is Mandawa village. The ward is also the mouth of the Mavuji River.
