= Likawage =

Ward in Kilwa District, Lindi Region

Likawage Kata ya Likawage (Swahili)
- Ward
- Kata ya Likawage, Wilaya ya Kilwa
- Location within Tanzania
- Country: Tanzania
- Region: Lindi Region
- District: Kilwa District
- Seat: Likawage Village

Area
  - Total: 1,679 km^{2} (648 sq mi)
- Elevation: 165 m (541 ft)

Population (2012)
  - Total: 3,569
  - Density: 2.126/km^{2} (5.505/sq mi)

Ethnic groups
  - Settler: Swahili
  - Native: Mwera
- Tanzanian Postal Code: 65413

Likawage is an administrative ward in Kilwa District of Lindi Region in Tanzania. The ward covers an area of 1,679 km^{2} (648 sq mi), and has an average elevation of 165 m (541 ft). According to the 2012 census, the ward has a total population of 10,434. The ward seat is Likawage village.
