= Kilwa Masoko, Lindi =

Ward in Kilwa District, Lindi Region, Tanzania

Masoko Kata ya Masoko (Swahili)
- Ward
- Kata ya Masoko, Wilaya ya Kilwa
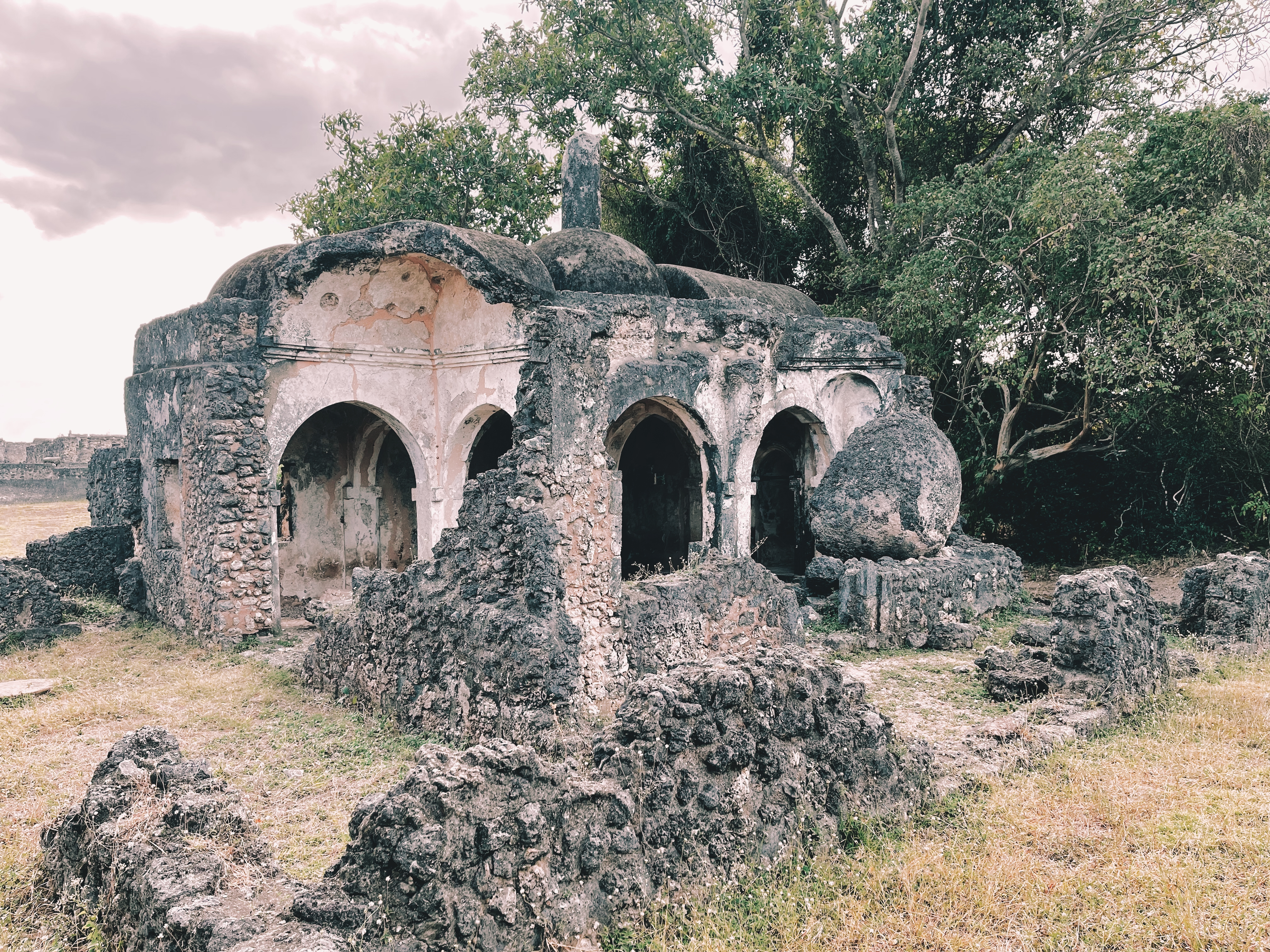
- Husini Ndogo in Kilwa Masoko Ward

- Location within Tanzania
- Country: Tanzania
- Region: Lindi Region
- District: Kilwa District

Area
  - Total: 200 km^{2} (77 sq mi)
- Elevation: 11 m (36 ft)

Population (2012)
  - Total: 13,601
  - Density: 68/km^{2} (180/sq mi)

Ethnic groups
  - Settler: Swahili
  - Native: Matumbi
- Tanzanian Postal Code: 65401

Kilwa Masoko or Masoko is an administrative ward in Kilwa District of Lindi Region in Tanzania. The ward covers an area of 200 km^{2} (77 sq mi), and has an average elevation of 11 m (36 ft). The ward is also the capital of Kilwa District. According to the 2012 census, the ward has a total population of 13,601.

== History ==
For over a millennium the Kilwa Masoko area was originally inhabited by the Mwera people. However, in the 10th to 16th century the area was part of the Swahili city states that spanned along the East African coast based at the prosperous Swahili city of Kilwa Kisiwani across the Kilwa sound. The name Masoko means "markets" in the Swahili language. The town of Kilwa Masoko as we know today was established as the seat for Kilwa district after the British in 1918 and they built a deep water port at the site for their vessels. When Tanganyika became independent in 1961, the government chose to keep Kilwa Masoko as the district seat. In 2008, the town got its own government from a ward to a township authority.

== Geography ==
The town of Kilwa Masoko is located at the tip of the Kilwa Peninsula 300 km south of Dar es Salaam. Across east from the Kilwa sound is the Island of Kilwa Kisiwani. To the south of the peninsula is the Mavuji River.

== Demographics ==
According to the 2012 Tanzania National Census, the population of the Kilwa Masoko was 13,601 of which 6,462 were male and 7,139 were female. Most residents of Kilwa district practice Sunni Islam. Kilwa Masoko has one of the smallest household sizes in Kilwa district with 3.9 people per household.

== Economy ==
The economy of Kilwa Masoko is primarily based on government administration and Cultural tourism. On nearby Kilwa Kisiwani island there are ancient Swahili ruins which were declared a UNESCO World Heritage Site in 1981, and is only accessible by boat through from the port of Kilwa Masoko. Other economic activities include fishing and small scale urban agriculture within the town. The town hosts a few number of hotels for guests and tourists.

== Arts & Culture ==
The culture of Kilwa Masoko is mostly Swahili culture with a mix of traditional Mwera customs and values.

=== Historic Buildings ===
See: Kilwa Kisiwani

Historic building located within Kilwa Masoko Township include Great Mosque of Kilwa, a rapidly deteriorating mosque built using Swahili architecture in the Middle Ages in the height of Swahili civilization. Husuni Kubwa is a palace in ruins that once hosted the sultan of Kilwa. Kilwa Fort, a fort built by the portuguese after the sacking of Kilwa. Husuni Ndogo is a small fort with the exact use for it remain unknown. More buildings are at Songo Mnara Island, that are yet to be uncovered.

== Government & Infrastructure ==
Kilwa Masoko is a town that is governed by town authority structure with a Township Executive Officer (TEO). The Kilwa Masoko township authority is divided administratively into 9 hamlets:

1. Mpara
2. Lupedile
3. Mkwanyule
4. Kisangi
5. Muchomalo
6. Mnazi Mmoja
7. Miembe-miwili
8. Masoko
9. Kisiwani

=== Transportation ===
Kilwa Masoko is served by a deep water port located at the southern tip of the town. The town is served by air through the Kilwa Masoko Airport (KIY) and is connected to the National Highway B2 through Kilwa road. Also Kilwa is served by major regional buses to and from Dar es Salaam and Mtwara.

== Education & Health ==
Schools located in Kilwa Masoko Township Authority:

1. Mnazi Mmoja Primary School
2. Kilwa Secondary School
3. Kilwa Primary School
4. Masoko Primary school
5. Kilwa Islamic Secondary School
6. Iyahi Koranic Middle School (Kilwa Kisiwani)
7. Kilwa Masoko Adult Education Training Center
8. Ukombozi Primary school

Healthcare centers located in Kiswal masoko Township Authority:

1. Masoko Urban Health Center
2. The Kilwa Masoko BAKWATA Dispensary.
