= Tingi, Lindi =

Ward in Kilwa District, Lindi Region

Tingi Kata ya Tingi (Swahili)
- Ward
- Kata ya Tingi, Wilaya ya Kilwa
- Location within Tanzania
- Country: Tanzania
- Region: Lindi Region
- District: Kilwa District
- Seat: Njianne Village

Area
  - Total: 104 km^{2} (40 sq mi)
- Elevation: 35 m (115 ft)

Population (2012)
  - Total: 6,782
  - Density: 65.2/km^{2} (169/sq mi)

Ethnic groups
  - Settler: Swahili
  - Native: Matumbi
- Tanzanian Postal Code: 65404

Tingi is an administrative ward in Kilwa District of Lindi Region in Tanzania. The ward covers an area of 104 km^{2} (40 sq mi), and has an average elevation of 35 m (115 ft). According to the 2012 census, the ward has a total population of 6,782. The ward seat is Njianne village.
