= Mbwemkuru River =

River in Lindi Region

- Native name: Mto Mbwemkuru (Swahili)

Location
- Country: Tanzania

Physical characteristics
- Source
  - location: Lilombe, Liwale District
- Mouth
  - location: Indian Ocean
  - coordinates: 9°28′51″S 39°39′16″E

Mbwemkuru River is located in the southern part of Lindi Region, Tanzania. It begins in Lilombe ward in Liwale District and drains on the border of Kilolambwani and Lihimalyao wards on the Indian Ocean, with the former in Lindi District and the Latter in Kilwa District. The river is the largest and longest river in Lindi region.
