= Lindi District =

District of Lindi Region, Tanzania

Lindi Wilaya ya Lindi (Swahili)
- District
- Wilaya ya Lindi, Mkoa wa Lindi
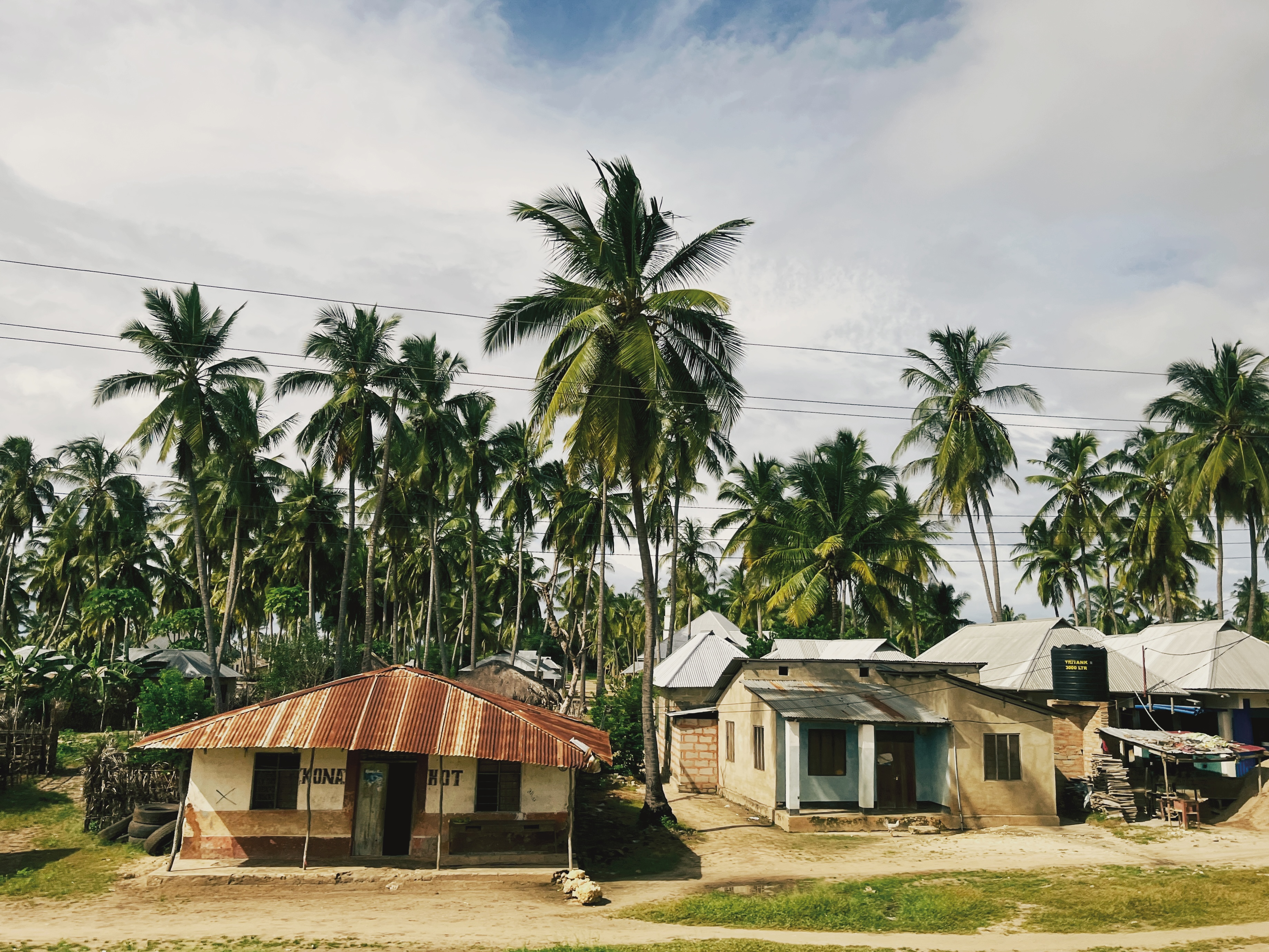
- Mchinga Ward, Lindi-Mtama District
- Nickname: Jurassic Tanzania
- Lindi District location map
- Coordinates: 10°9′54.36″S 39°26′29.76″E
- Country: Tanzania
- Region: Lindi Region
- Named for: Lindi
- Capital: Mtama

Area
  - Total: 5,975 km^{2} (2,307 sq mi)

Population (2012)
  - Total: 194,143
  - Density: 32.49/km^{2} (84.16/sq mi)
- Demonym: District Lindian

Ethnic groups
  - Settler: Swahili
  - Native: Matumbi, Mwera & Machinga
- Website: http://www.lindidc.go.tz

Lindi District also known as Mtama District is one of six administrative districts of Lindi Region in Tanzania. The District covers an area of 5,975 km^{2} (2,307 sq mi). Kilwa district is bordered to the north by Kilwa District, to the east by the Indian Ocean and Lindi Municipal District, to the south by the Mtwara Region, and to the west by the Nachingwea District. The district seat (capital) is the town and ward of Mtama. The district is known for the Tendaguru Formation, the richest Late Jurassic strata of fossils in Africa. According to the 2012 census, the district has a total population of 191,143.

== History ==
What is currently Lindi District, was first settled by Machinga people in the north, the Mwera in the west and the Makonde in the south of the district. The Lindi District Council is among the oldest local governments in Lindi Region. It was created in 1953 and at that point, it was known as Lindi Native Authority (LNA). It is one among the six districts in Lindi Region. Lindi district is well known in the Paleontology community for the Tendaguru Formation. Lindi as a district is the ancestral home to Bantu people groups, namely the Machinga people and the Makonde people together with the Mwera people, the latter being the majority.

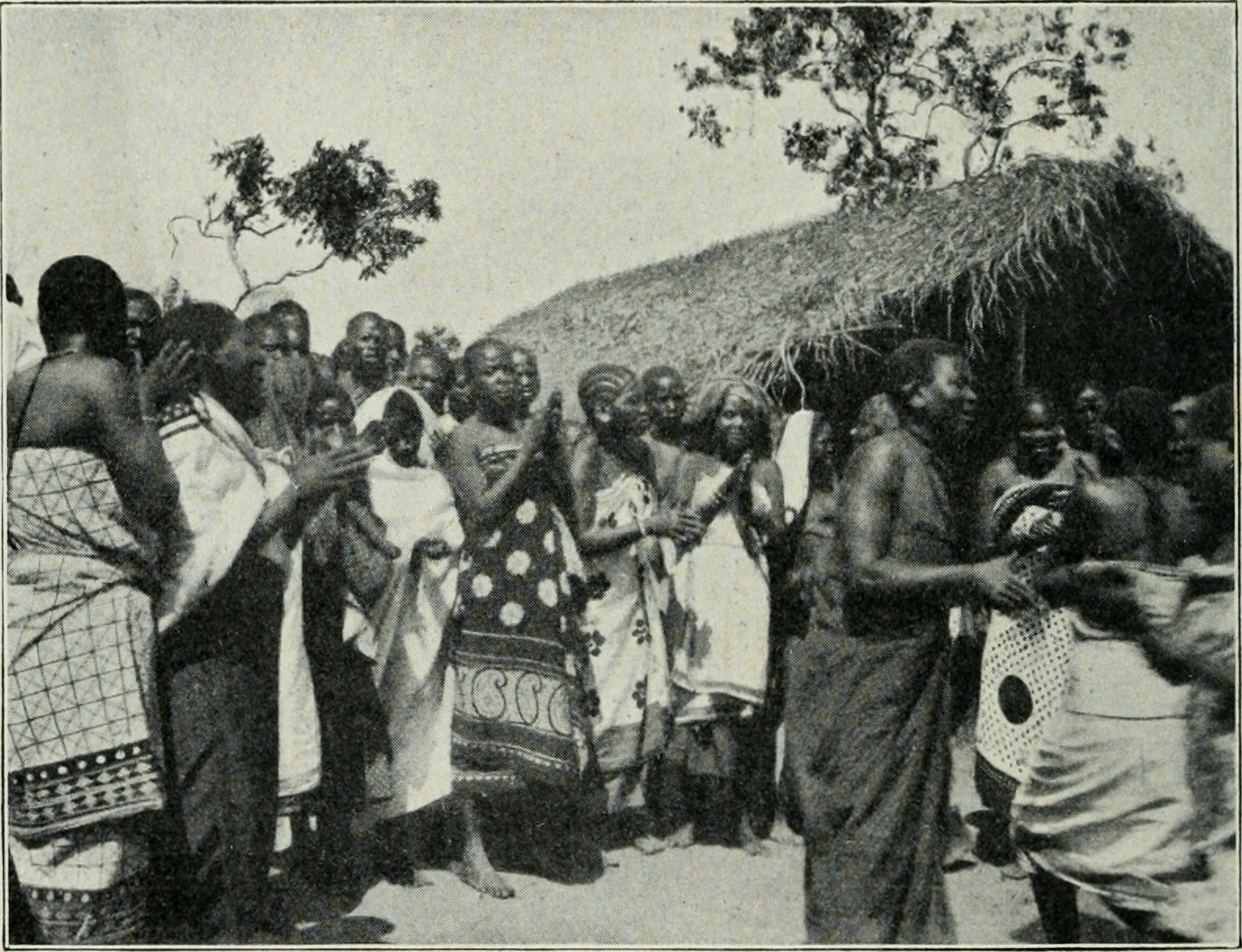
Lindi District,(1912)

== Geography ==
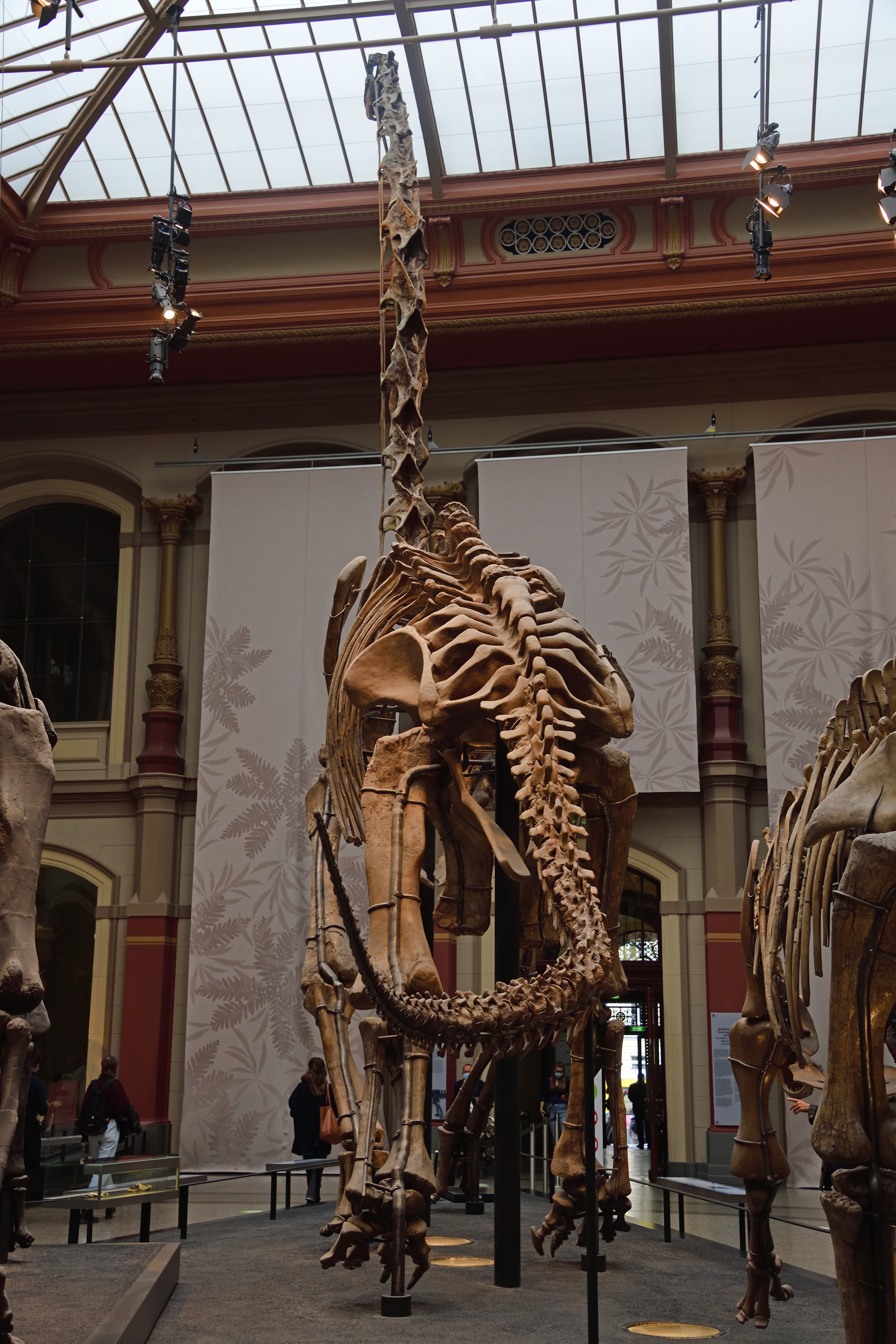
Giraffatitan skeleton in Museum in Berlin

Lindi-Mtama district is the 4th largest district in Lindi region. It has a total area of 5,975 square kilometers. The soil quality in the district varies with the richest soils located in center of the district while the poorer soils are found in the north west. Lindi district is likewise home to the Tendaguru Formation, a Late Jurassic fossil record, where a total skeleton of the biggest land creatures to at any point exists; Giraffatitan was found by German colonizers in 1906 during their control of the domain in the mid-twentieth century. Different fossils that were observed there are the Kentrosaurus, Janenschia, Tornieria, Tendaguria, Dysalotosaurus, Australodocus, Elaphrosaurus, Veterupristisaurus, and Dicraeosaurus types of dinosaurs. Over 225 tons of fossils have been excavated at the Tendaguru Formation.

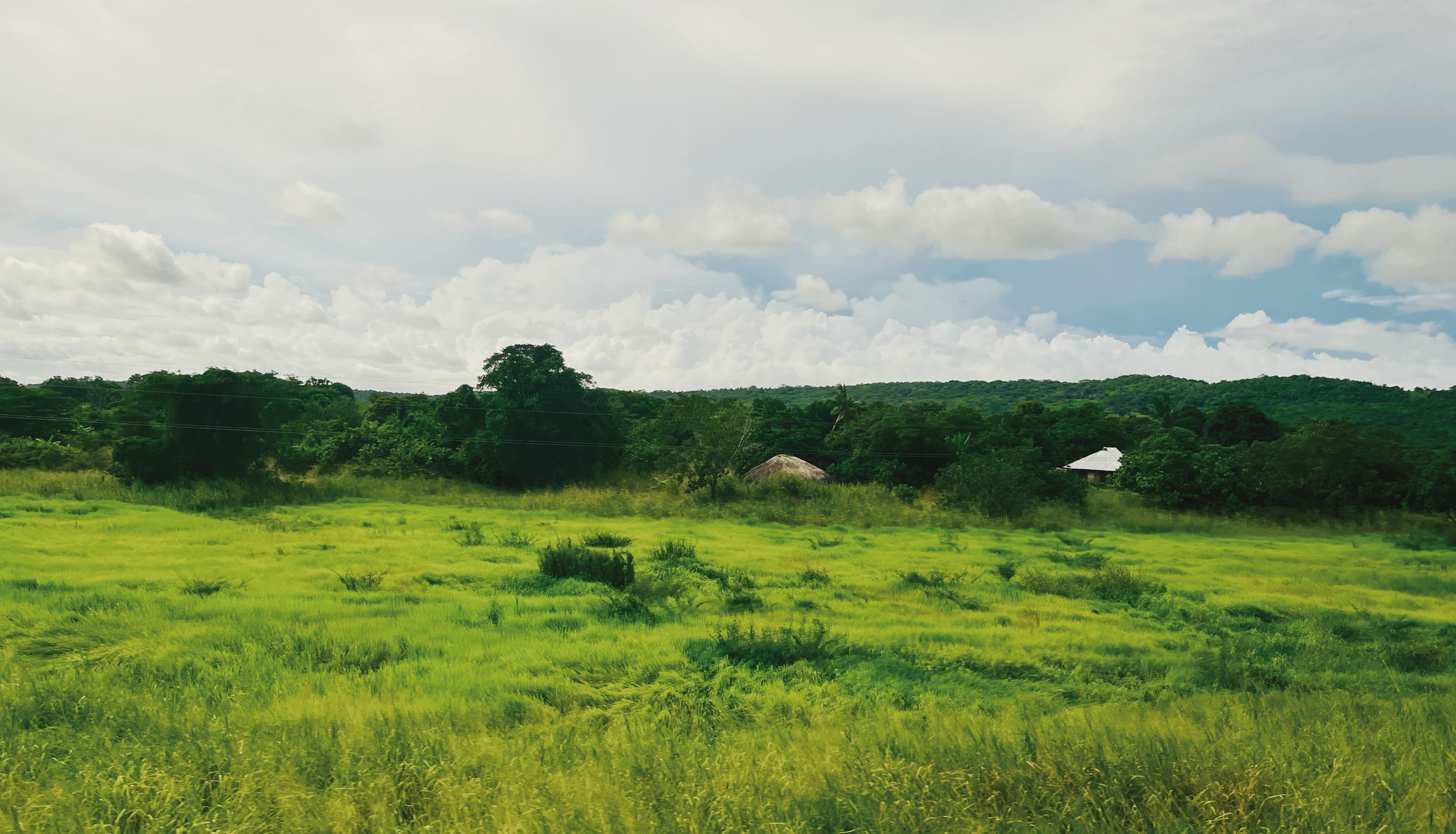
Mchinga Landscape in Lindi District

== Demographics ==
According to the 2012 Tanzania National Census, the population of the Lindi District was 194,143. Most residents of Kilwa district practice Sunni Islam.As mentioned in the history section of this article Kilwa district is the ancestral home of the Mwera, Makonde people and Machinga people. As of recent, most of the Lindi population has been Swahilized and speak Swahili as their first language and practice Swahili culture.

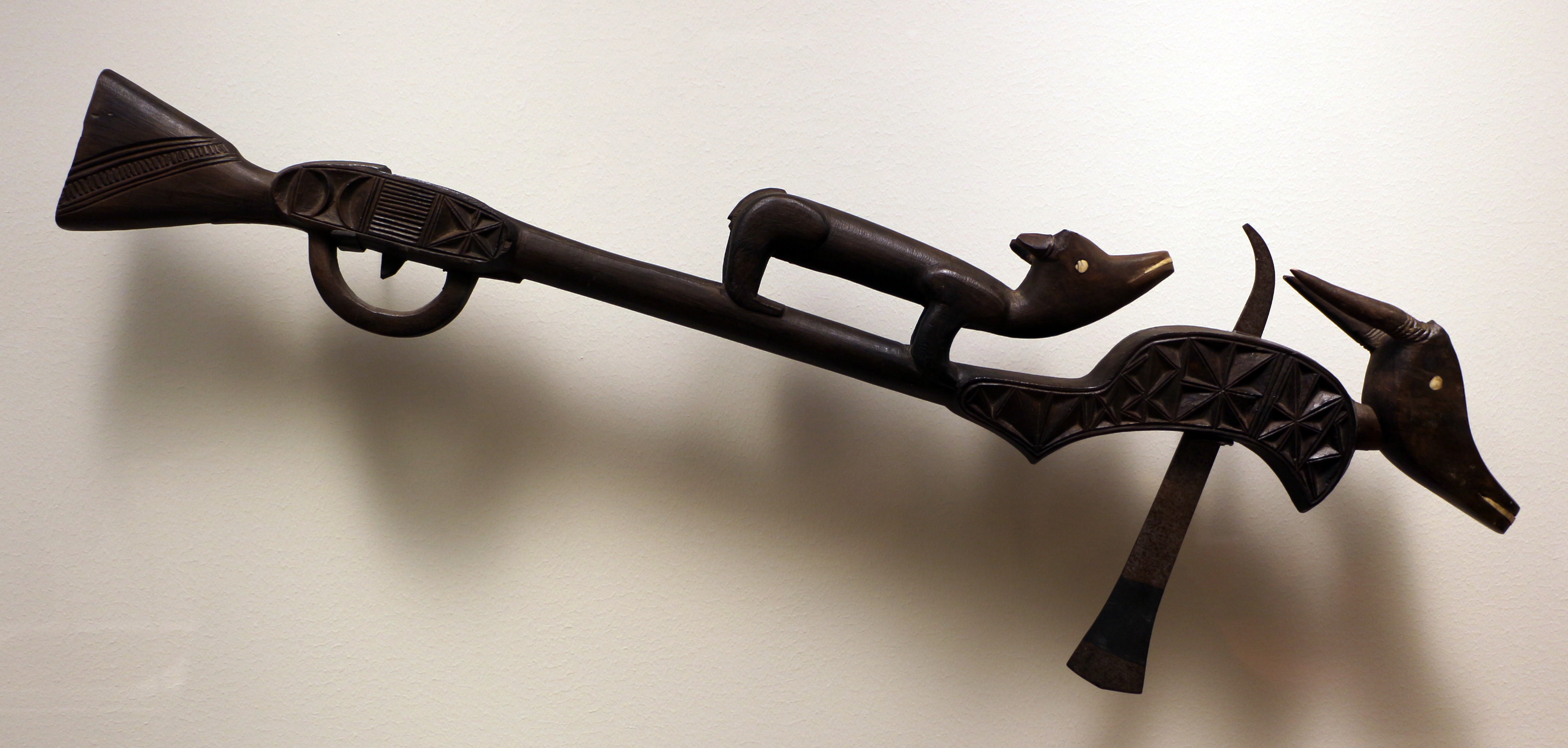
Mwera Artifact,1900-15ca

== Economy ==
The main economic activity in Lindi around 63% is subsistence agriculture and fishing. However, commercial food crops grown in the district are Cashews and Sesame seeds. The main crops grown for local consumption includes coconuts, cassava, maize, sorghum and African rice.

== Administrative Divisions ==
The Lindi District is administratively divided into thirty wards.

=== Wards ===
- Chiponda
- Kilangala
- Kilolambwani
- Kitomanga
- Kiwalala
- Kiwawa
- Longa
- Majengo
- Mandwanga
- Matimba
- Mchinga
- Milola
- Mipingo
- Mnara
- Mnolela
- Mtama
- Mtua
- Mtumbya
- Nachunyu
- Nahukahuka
- Namangwale
- Namupa
- Nangaru
- Navanga
- Nyangamara
- Nyangao
- Nyengedi
- Pangatena
- Rutamba
- Sudi

== Education & Health ==
As of 2022, there were 144 Schools in Lindi-Mtama district, 117 of are primary schools and 27 are secondary schools. In Terms of Healthcare facilities, as of 2022 Lindi district is home to 49 healthcare facilities namely; 1 hospital, 42 clinics and 6 heath centers.
