= Nanjirinji =

Ward in Kilwa District, Lindi Region

Nanjirinji Kata ya Nanjirinji (Swahili)
- Ward
- Kata ya Miteja, Wilaya ya Kilwa
- Location within Tanzania
- Country: Tanzania
- Region: Lindi Region
- District: Kilwa District
- Seat: Najirinji Village

Area
  - Total: 3,733 km^{2} (1,441 sq mi)
- Elevation: 224 m (735 ft)

Population (2012)
  - Total: 7,491
  - Density: 2.007/km^{2} (5.197/sq mi)

Ethnic groups
  - Settler: Swahili
  - Native: Mwera
- Tanzanian Postal Code: 65412

Nanjirinji is an administrative ward in Kilwa District of Lindi Region in Tanzania. The ward covers an area of 3,733 km^{2} (1,441 sq mi), and has an average elevation of 224 m (735 ft). According to the 2012 census, the ward has a total population of 7,491. The ward seat is Nanjirinji village. Nanjirinji ward is also the source of the Mavuji River.
