= Kiranjeranje =

Ward in Kilwa District, Lindi Region

Kiranjeranje Kata ya Kiranjeranje (Swahili)
- Ward
- Kata ya Kiranjeranje, Wilaya ya Kilwa
- Location within Tanzania
- Country: Tanzania
- Region: Lindi Region
- District: Kilwa District
- Seat: Kiranjeranje Village

Area
  - Total: 684 km^{2} (264 sq mi)
- Elevation: 116 m (381 ft)

Population (2012)
  - Total: 9,752
  - Density: 14.3/km^{2} (36.9/sq mi)

Ethnic groups
  - Settler: Swahili
  - Native: Machinga
- Tanzanian Postal Code: 65411

Kiranjeranje is an administrative ward in Kilwa District of Lindi Region in Tanzania. The ward covers an area of 684 km^{2} (264 sq mi), and has an average elevation of 116 m (381 ft). According to the 2012 census, the ward has a total population of 9,752. The ward seat is Kiranjeranje village.
