= Lukuliro River =

River in Lindi Region

- Native name: Mto Lukuliro (Swahili)

Location
- Country: Tanzania

Physical characteristics
- Source
  - location: Mkutano, Liwale, Liwale District
- Mouth
  - location: Indian Ocean

Lukuliro River is a tributary of the Rufiji River that starts in Liwale District of Lindi Region, Tanzania. It begins in Mkutano, Liwale ward and Joins the Rufiji in Pwani Region's Utete ward. The river begins in the Selous Game Reserve.
