= Mingumbi =

Ward in Kilwa District, Lindi Region

Mingumbi Kata ya Mingumbi (Swahili)
- Ward
- Kata ya Mingumbi, Wilaya ya Kilwa
- Location within Tanzania
- Country: Tanzania
- Region: Lindi Region
- District: Kilwa District
- Seat: Mingumbi Village

Area
  - Total: 258.5 km^{2} (99.8 sq mi)
- Elevation: 114 m (374 ft)

Population (2012)
  - Total: 9,948
  - Density: 38.48/km^{2} (99.67/sq mi)

Ethnic groups
  - Settler: Swahili
  - Native: Matumbi
- Tanzanian Postal Code: 65405

Mingumbi is an administrative ward in Kilwa District of Lindi Region in Tanzania. The ward covers an area of 258.5 km^{2} (99.8 sq mi), and has an average elevation of 114 m (374 ft). According to the 2012 census, the ward has a total population of 9,948. The ward seat is Mingumbi village.
