= Nan'goma Cave =

Cave in Tanzania

Nan'goma Caves
- Mapango ya Nan'goma (Swahili)
- Location within Tanzania
- Location: Kipatimu, Kilwa District, Lindi Region, Tanzania
- Coordinates: 8°30′41.2″S 38°53′0.7″E
- Length: 7510m
- Geology: Limestone

Nan'goma Cave (or Nandembo) is a cave system located in Kipatimu and Kibata ward of Kilwa District in Lindi Region of Tanzania.

With 7510m of surveyed underground passages, it is the longest cave in Tanzania.
