= Kongowele =

Mountain in Lindi Region of Tanzania

- Milima Kongolewe (Swahili)

Highest point
- Elevation: 830 m (2,720 ft)
- Coordinates: 10°39′55.0764″S 38°3′11.5416″W

Geography
- Country: Tanzania
- Regions: Lindi Region

The Kongowele is the highest point in Lindi Region. The peak is located in Matekwe ward in Nachingwea District. The elevation of the peak is 830m.
