= Kilwa Kivinje =

Ward in Kilwa District, Lindi Region

Kilwa Kivinje Kata ya Kivinjesingino (Swahili)
- Ward
- Kata ya Kivinjesingino, Wilaya ya Kilwa
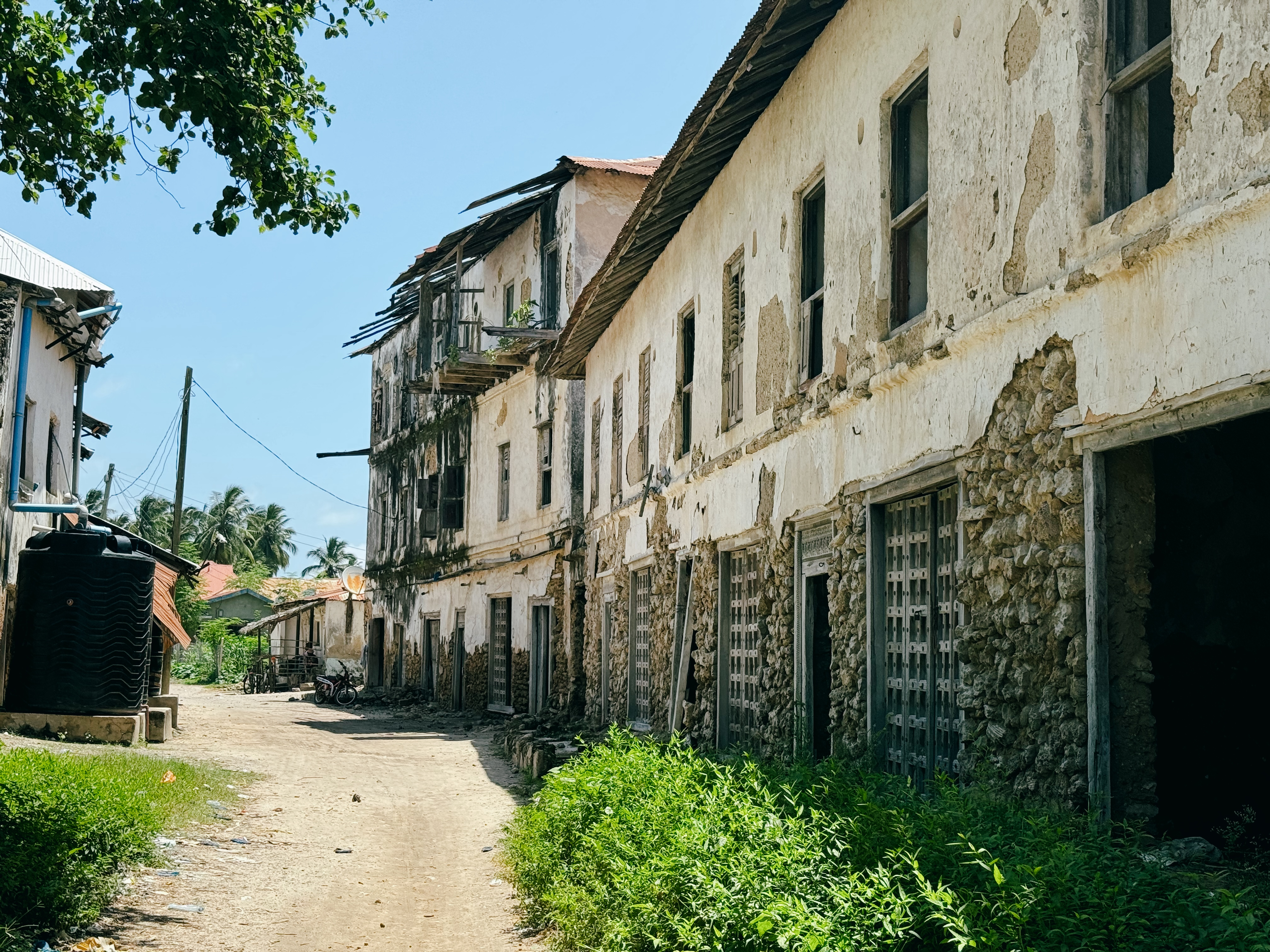
- Historic Kilwa Kivinje, Kilwa DC, Lindi Region

- Location within Tanzania
- Country: Tanzania
- Region: Lindi Region
- District: Kilwa District

Area
  - Total: 403.8 km^{2} (155.9 sq mi)
- Elevation: 31 m (102 ft)

Population (2012)
  - Total: 19,376
  - Density: 47.98/km^{2} (124.3/sq mi)

Ethnic groups
  - Settler: Swahili
  - Native: Matumbi
- Tanzanian Postal Code: 65402

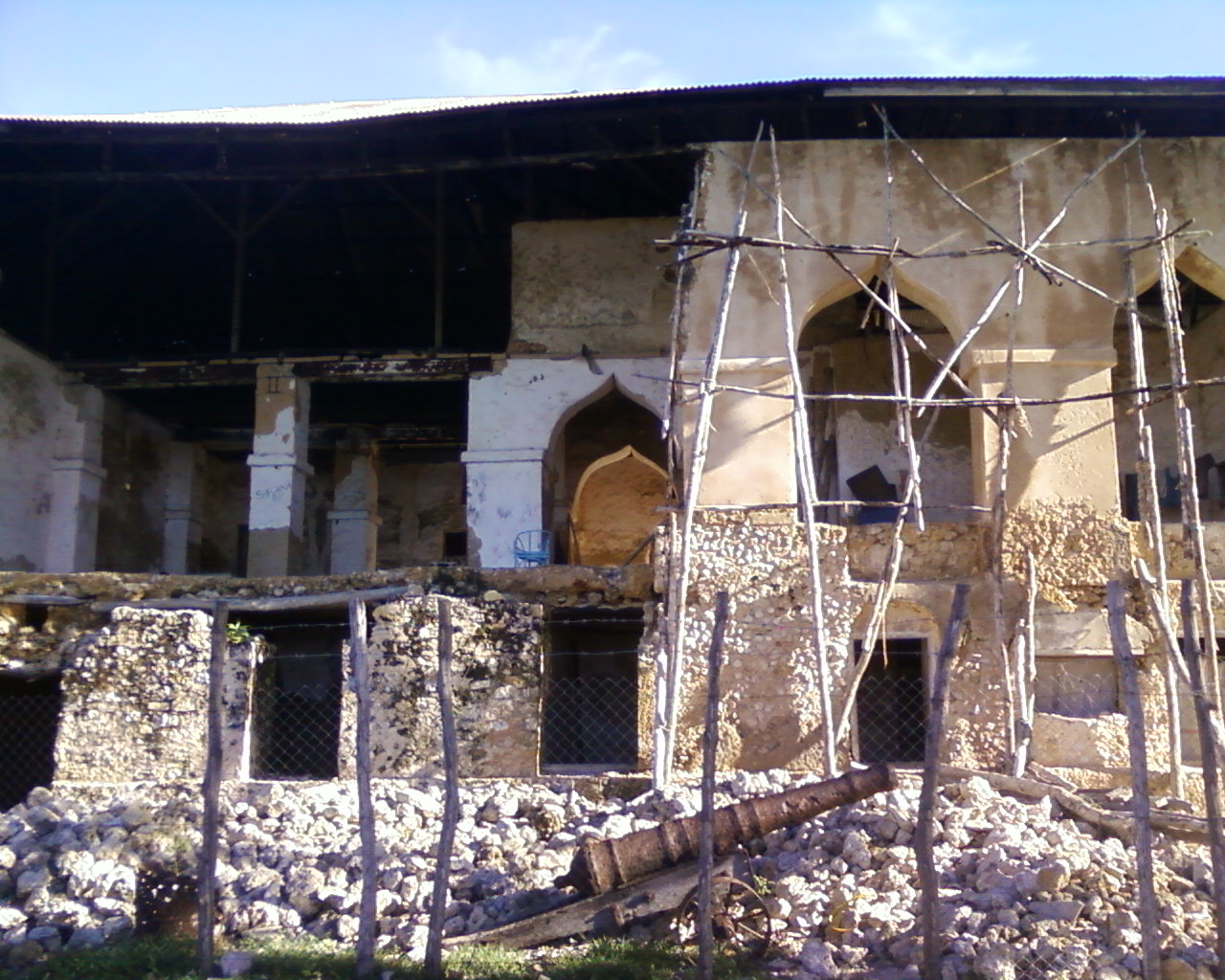
Ruins of colonial German Building in Kilwa Kivinje

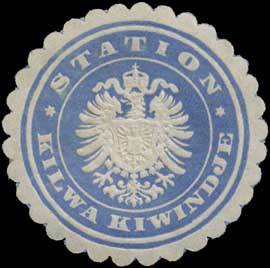
German colonial Station seal for Kilwa Kivinje early 20th century

Kilwa Kivinje also known as Kivinjesingino is an administrative ward in Kilwa District of Lindi Region in Tanzania. The ward covers an area of 403.8 km^{2} (155.9 sq mi), and has an average elevation of 31 m (102 ft). According to the 2012 census, the ward has a total population of 19,376.
