= Kinjumbi =

Ward in Kilwa District, Lindi Region

Kinjumbi Kata ya Kinjumbi (Swahili)
- Ward
- Kata ya Kinjumbi, Wilaya ya Kilwa
- Location within Tanzania
- Country: Tanzania
- Region: Lindi Region
- District: Kilwa District

Area
  - Total: 475.4 km^{2} (183.6 sq mi)
- Elevation: 69 m (226 ft)

Population (2012)
  - Total: 14,426
  - Density: 30.34/km^{2} (78.59/sq mi)

Ethnic groups
  - Settler: Swahili
  - Native: Matumbi
- Tanzanian Postal Code: 65419

Kinjumbi is an administrative ward in Kilwa District of Lindi Region in Tanzania. The ward covers an area of 475.4 km^{2} (183.6 sq mi), and has an average elevation of 69 m (226 ft). According to the 2012 census, the ward has a total population of 14,426.
