= Marambo =

- Rural Settlement
- Location within Tanzania
- Coordinates: 10°13′0″S 38°45′0″E
- Country: Tanzania
- Region: Lindi

Population (1998)
  - Total: 3,800

Marambo is a rural settlement in the Nachingwea District of the Lindi Region in Tanzania.

Marambo consists of 600 dwellings spread over five villages.
