= Chumo, Lindi =

Ward in Kilwa District, Lindi Region

Chumo Kata ya Chumo (Swahili)
- Ward
- Kata ya Chumo, Wilaya ya Kilwa
- Location within Tanzania
- Country: Tanzania
- Region: Lindi Region
- District: Kilwa District
- Seat: Chumo Village

Area
  - Total: 271 km^{2} (105 sq mi)
- Elevation: 277 m (909 ft)

Population (2012)
  - Total: 13,897
  - Density: 51.3/km^{2} (133/sq mi)

Ethnic groups
  - Settler: Swahili
  - Native: Matumbi
- Tanzanian Postal Code: 65406

Chumo is an administrative ward in Kilwa District of Lindi Region in Tanzania. The ward covers an area of 271 km^{2} (105 sq mi), and has an average elevation of 277 m (909 ft). According to the 2012 census, the ward has a total population of 13,897. The ward seat is Chumo.
