= Kipatimu =

Ward in Kilwa District, Lindi Region

Kipatimu Kata ya Kipatimu (Swahili)
- Ward
- Kata ya Kipatimu, Wilaya ya Kilwa
- Location within Tanzania
- Country: Tanzania
- Region: Lindi Region
- District: Kilwa District
- Seat: Kipatimu Village

Area
  - Total: 370.5 km^{2} (143.1 sq mi)
- Elevation: 468 m (1,535 ft)

Population (2012)
  - Total: 14,606
  - Density: 39.42/km^{2} (102.1/sq mi)
- Tanzanian Postal Code: 65418

Kipatimu is an administrative ward in Kilwa District of Lindi Region in Tanzania. The ward covers an area of 370.5 km^{2} (143.1 sq mi), and has an average elevation of 468 m (1,535 ft). According to the 2012 census, the ward has a total population of 14,606. The ward seat is Kipatimu village. The ward is also home to the Nan'goma Cave system.
