= Kilwa District =

District of Lindi Region, Tanzania

Kilwa
- District
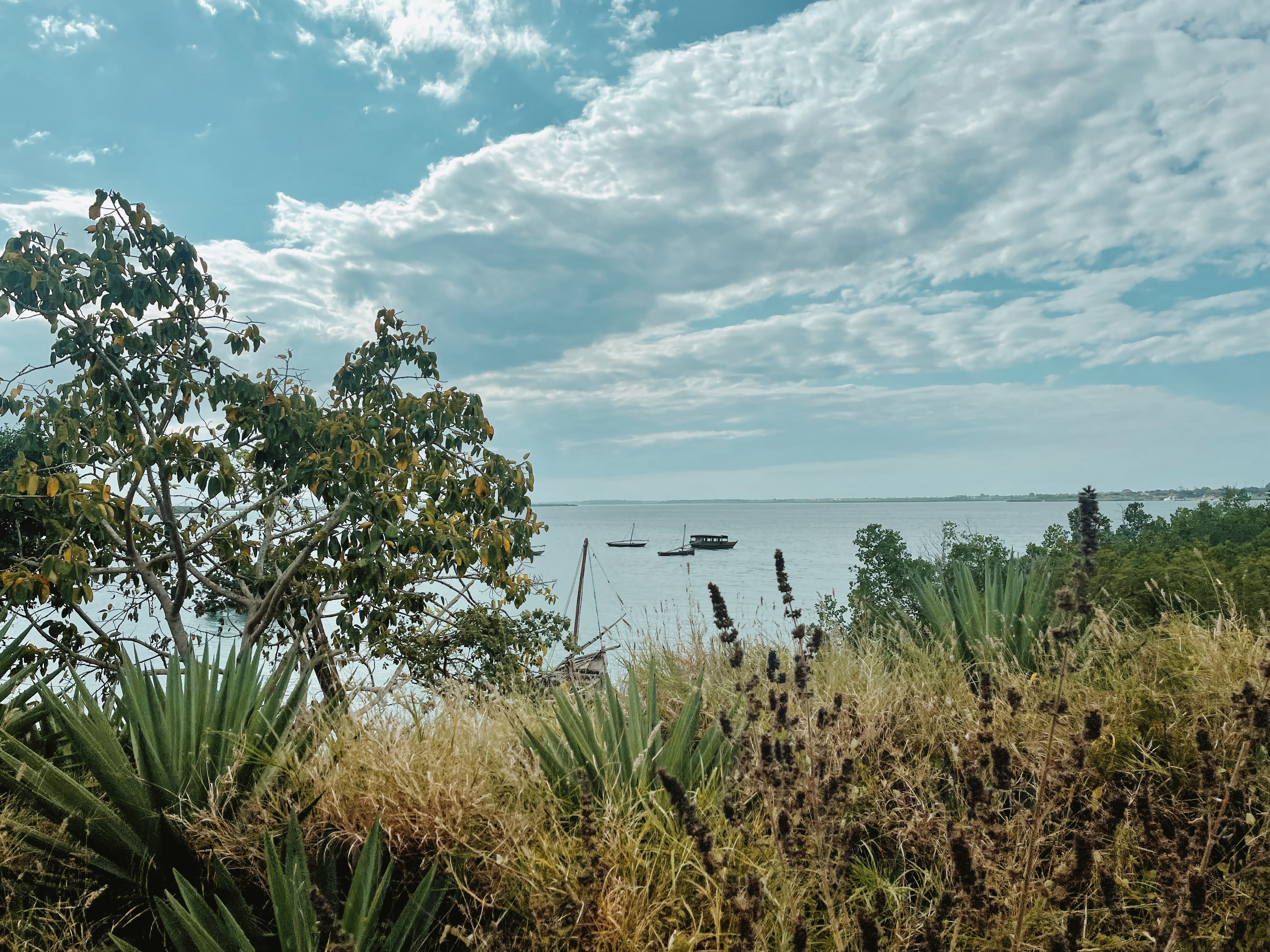
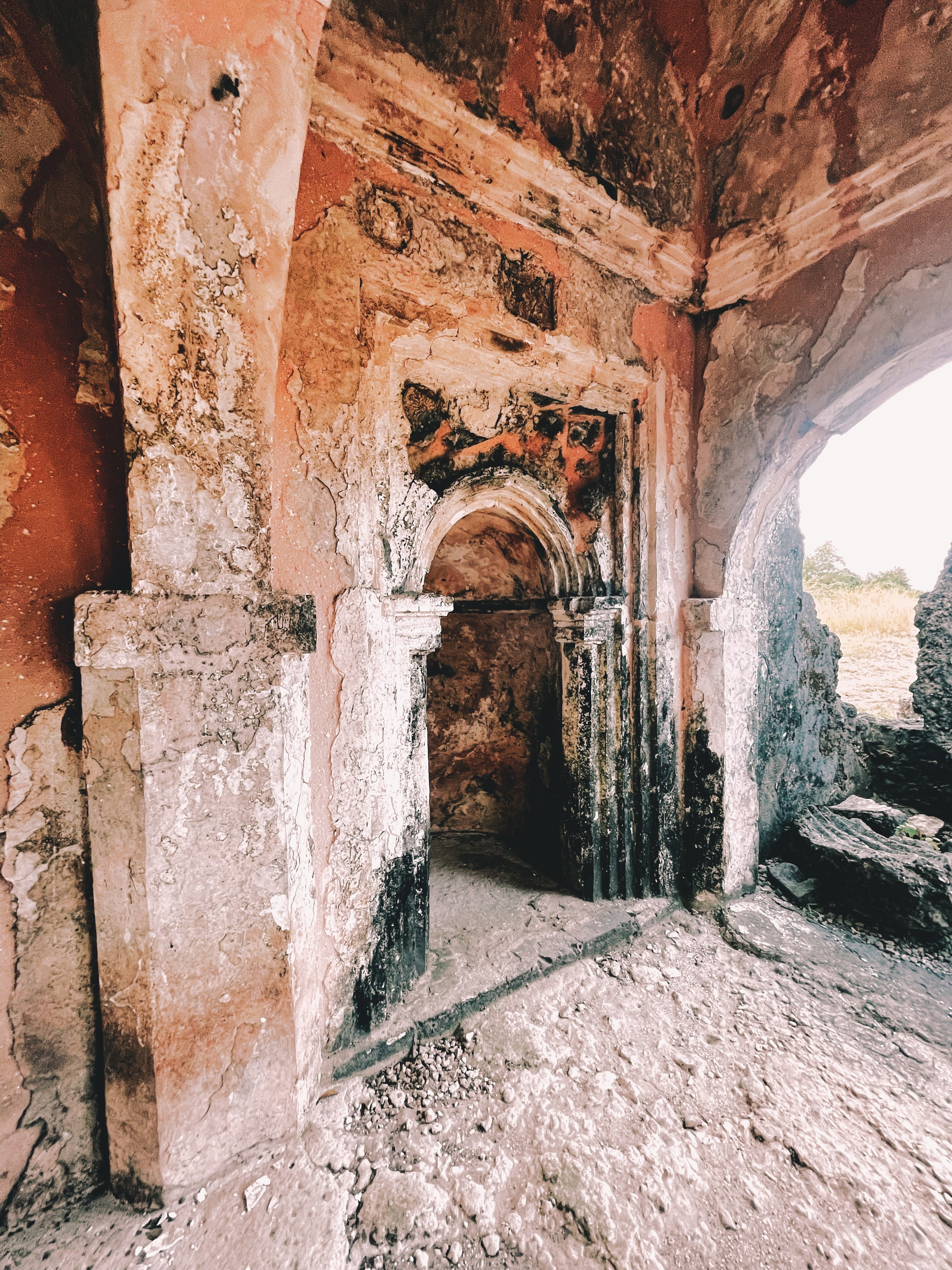
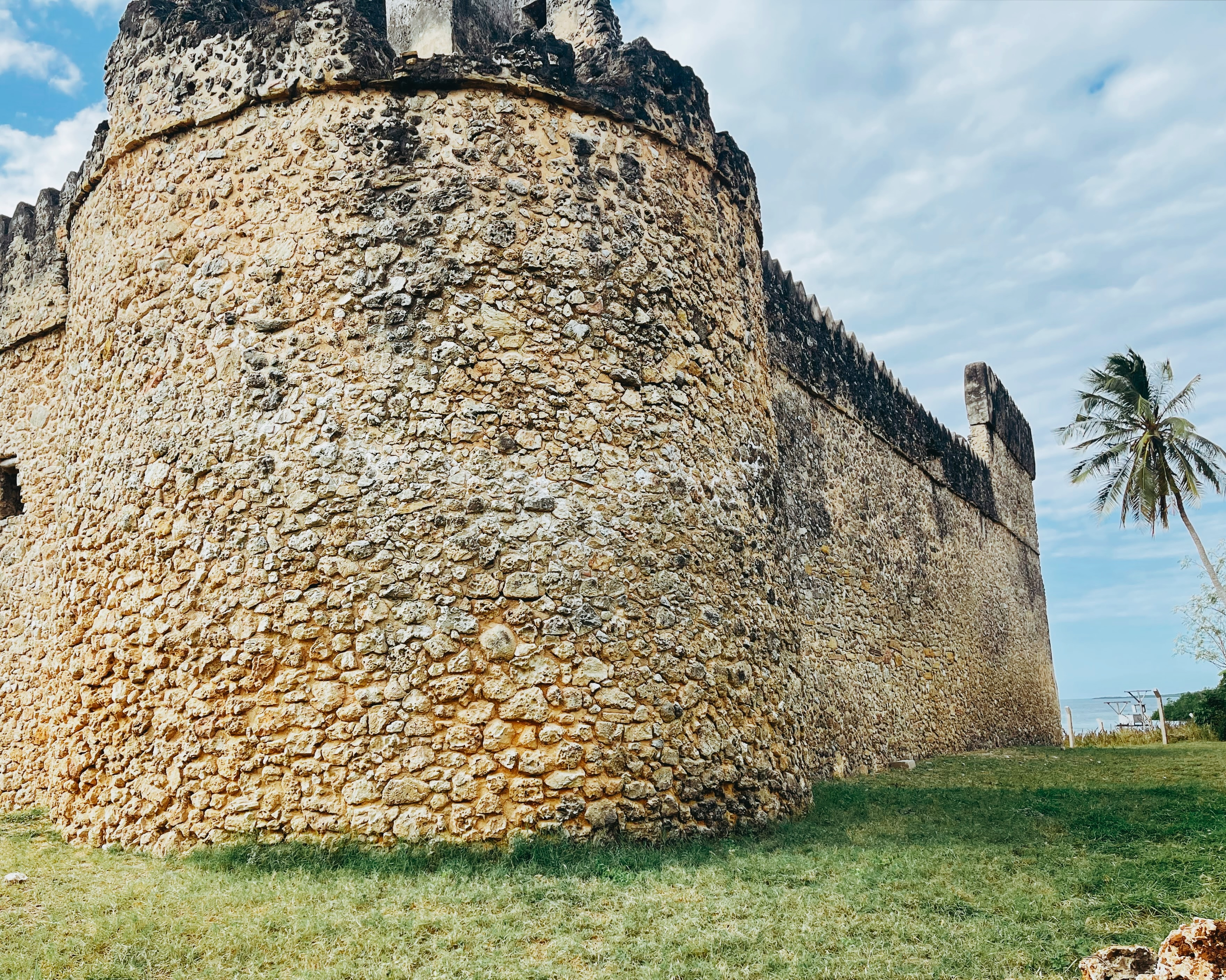
- From top to bottom: Kilwa Masoko ward Landscape, the Medieval Swahili ruins of Kilwa Kisiwani & the Fort at kilwa
- Nickname: Historic Kilwa
- Kilwa District in Lindi
- Coordinates: 9°8′58.92″S 38°59′15.72″E
- Country: Tanzania
- Region: Lindi Region
- Named for: Kilwa Kisiwani
- Capital: Kilwa Masoko

Area
  - Total: 15,000 km^{2} (5,800 sq mi)
  - Rank: 2nd in Lindi

Population (2022)
  - Total: 297,676
  - Rank: 1st in Lindi
  - Density: 20/km^{2} (51/sq mi)
- Demonym: District Kilwan

Ethnic groups
  - Settler: Swahili
  - Native: Matumbi, Mwera Shiraz & Machinga
- Website: http://www.kilwadc.go.tz

Kilwa District (Wilaya ya Kilwa in Swahili) is one of six administrative districts of Lindi Region in Tanzania. The District covers an area of 15,000 km^{2} (5,800 sq mi). The district is comparable in size to the land area of the nation state of East Timor. Kilwa district is bordered to the north by Rufiji District in Pwani Region, to the east by the Indian Ocean, to the south by the Lindi District, Nachingwea District together with Ruangwa District, and to the west by the Liwale District. The district borders every other district in Lindi Region except Lindi Municipal District. The district seat (capital) is the town of Kilwa Masoko. The district is named after the medieval Swahili city state of Kilwa Kisiwani. In 1905, the Maji Maji Revolt began in Kilwa District of Lindi when the Matumbi first attacked the Akida seat in the Kibata ward, killing a German colonizer. According to the 2012 census, the district has a total population of 190,744. By 2022, the population had increased to 297,676.

== History ==
The area that is now Kilwa district has been inhabited by humans for thousands of years. The area is the ancestral home to four Bantu people groups, namely the Mwera people and the Matumbi people together with the Machinga people later Shiraz. The Matumbi being historically the majority native group inhabiting the most land in the district. They are the natives of the entire central and northern Kilwa district and Kilwa's islands. The Machinga people are native to the south eastern section of the district to the border with Lindi District. The Mwera inhabit the south west part of the district.The Shiraz people inhabit central coast mainly Kilwa kisiwani, Songo mnara and Pande Division.

The four tribes became swahilized in the 9th century with the arrival of Islam in the region. The sultanate of Kilwa is reputed to have been founded about 975 by Ali ibn Ḥasan, a Persian prince from Shiraz. The new state, at first confined to the town of Kilwa, extended its influence along the coast from Zanzibar to Sofala, and the city came to be regarded as the capital of the Zanj region. An Arab chronicle gives a list of over forty sovereigns who reigned at Kilwa in a period of five hundred years, and the region was transformed into one of the wealthiest Swahili city states on the continent by the 14th century. Kilwa district is known globally for its Middle Ages Swahili historical sites from Middle Ages on the islands Kilwa Kisiwani and Songo Mnara which are part of the seven Tanzanian World Heritage Site.

The Swahili city-state of Kilwa was once the greatest Swahili port city but met its end on July 1505 when the Portuguese burned and looted the city. However in 1512 the Portuguese, whose ranks had been decimated by fever, temporarily abandoned the place. Subsequently Kilwa became one of the chief centres of the slave trade. Towards the end of the 17th century it fell under the dominion of the imams of Muscat, and on the separation in 1856 of their Arabian and African possessions became subject to the sultan of Zanzibar.

In 1866 the area of what is now Kilwa district was occupied by Germans who established their headquarters at Kilwa Kivinje and used it as a base to quell the Maji Maji rebellion that was based on the Matumbi Hills north of the Kilwa district.

In 1918 when Tanganyika became a British protectorate, Kilwa Masoko was chosen as it is the district seat and they built a deepwater port to assist with their commercial vessels. To this day Kilwa Masoko remains the capital of Kilwa district. During the British occupiation the district was one of six councils established in 1947 in lindi region. Post independence, in 1984 Kilwa was officially designated as a district council.

== Geography ==
Kilwa district is the second largest district in Lindi region. It has a total area of 13.347.50 square kilometers, of which 12,126 square kilometers is land and 1,221.25 square kilometers is water. Kilwa district has 5 Islands, with the largest one being Kilwa Kisiwani. The other islands in the Kilwa archipelago are [Kati Island] and Songo Mnara Island. In addition, the Songosongo Islands archipelago is composed of 21 coral reefs including the 4 coral islands. The four Islands in the archipelago are Fanjove, Nyuni Island, Songo Songo and Okuza Island. Kilwa District is home to Pindiro Forest Reserve where albino hippopotamuses have been observed.

The soil structure of Kilwa district is of low fertility is mostly made of well-drained, low-moisture retaining sedimentary sandstone. The [[Matandu River]] is the largest river running west to east of Kilwa district. The other rivers found in the district are the Mbwemkuru River, Matandu River and the Mavuji River. There is also a cave system in Kipatimu ward, the Nan'goma Cave. The cave system is located in the Matumbi Highlands which are shared between Kilwa District and Rufiji District in Pwani Region.

The climate of Kilwa District is a tropical Savannah climate with an average annual temperature range of 22 degree Celsius to 30 degrees Celsius. The annual precipitation is between 800 and 1400 millimeters per year. The north of the district being far wetter than the south with the former receiving an annual rainfall of 1000 to 1400mm. The latter receives around 800 to 1400 mm per year.

== Demographics ==
According to the 2012 Tanzania National Census, the population of the Kilwa District was 190,744. of which 91,661 were male and 99,083 were female. Most residents of Kilwa district practice Sunni Islam. In Lindi Region, Kilwa district has the average highest household size of 4.4. As mentioned in the history section of this article Kilwa district is the ancestral home of the Mwera, Matumbi and Machinga Shira. Most of the population has been Swahilized and speak Swahili as their first language and practice Swahili culture. However, many elderly and people living in rural areas speak their native languages.

== Economy ==
The main economic activity in Kilwa district is subsistence agriculture and fishing using traditional hand tools in small farmsteads and fishing villages. The main crops grown for local consumptions includes, cassava, maize, sorghum and African rice. High yield rice is grown along the Matandu river valley and upland rice is grown in Chumo and Kipatimu wards in northern Kilwa district. Cash crops grown for export include Sesame from Nanjirinji ward and Oranges and Coconut plantations in the Matumbi hill valleys in Kipatimu ward. Due to Tsetse fly, livestock rearing is restricted on the west part of Kilwa district.

Fishing plays a big role in the economic activities of Kilwa district. 4.5 million tons of fish are harvested annually with over 1700 registered fishermen using 600 vessels in the district. Songas company has begun extracting the natural gas field underlying the Songo Songo Island in Kilwa with the gas being piped to Dar es Salaam to generate electricity, and continuing efforts to locate hydrocarbon reserves (oil and/or gas) along structural trends around the Songo Songo group at least as far north as the island of Nyuni. The western frontier of the district is part of the Nyerere National Park. this park is home to wildlife such as the Big five game.

== Administrative subdivisions ==
As of 2012, Kilwa District was administratively divided into 21 wards.

=== Wards ===
1. Chumo
2. Kandawale
3. Kinjumbi
4. Kikole
5. Kipatimu
6. Kiranjeranje
7. Kilwa Kivinje

1. Lihimalyao
2. Likawage
3. Mandawa
4. Kilwa Masoko
5. Miguruwe
6. Mingumbi
7. Miteja

1. Mitole
2. Nanjirinji
3. Njinjo
4. Pande Mikoma
5. Songosongo
6. Tingi
7. Kibata

== Education & Health ==
As of February 2017, there were 140 Schools in Kilwa district, 113 of are primary schools and 27 are secondary schools. Intotal there were 52,127 registered primary students and 5,906 registered secondary students.

In Terms of Healthcare facilities, as of 2021 Kilwa district is home to 55 health centers namely; 2 hospitals (including Kilwa District hospital in Kivinje), 48 clinics and 14 clinics currently under construction.
