= Matumbi language =

Language

Matumbi
- Kimatuumbi
- Native to: Tanzania
- Region: Kilwa district
- Ethnicity: Matumbi people
- Native speakers: (72,000 cited 1978)
- Language family: Niger–Congo?: Atlantic–Congo; Benue–Congo; Bantoid; Bantu; Rufiji–Ruvuma; Mbinga; Ndengereko language; Matumbi

Language codes
- ISO 639-3: mgw
- Glottolog: matu1259
- Guthrie code: P.13

Matuumbi, also known as Kimatuumbi and Kimatumbi, is a language spoken in Tanzania in the Kipatimu region of the Kilwa District, south of the Rufiji river. It is a Bantu language, P13 in Guthrie's classification. Kimatuumbi is closely related to the Ngindo, Rufiji and Ndengereko languages. It is spoken by about 70,000 people, according to the Ethnologue.

Matuumbi is the augmentative plural of the Kimatuumbi word for 'hills' (singular form: kituumbi, class 7/8). Ki- is a Bantu noun class prefix attached to nouns of the class that includes languages (cf. Kiswahili, Kikongo).
