= Kibata =

Ward in Kilwa District, Lindi Region

Kibata Kata ya Kibata (Swahili)
- Ward
- Kata ya Kibata, Wilaya ya Kilwa
- Location within Tanzania
- Country: Tanzania
- Region: Lindi Region
- District: Kilwa District
- Seat: Kibata Village

Area
  - Total: 139.5 km^{2} (53.9 sq mi)
- Elevation: 415 m (1,362 ft)

Population (2012)
  - Total: 8,730
  - Density: 62.6/km^{2} (162/sq mi)

Ethnic groups
  - Settler: Swahili
  - Native: Matumbi
- Tanzanian Postal Code: 65421

Kibata is an administrative ward in Kilwa District of Lindi Region in Tanzania. The ward covers an area of 139.5 km^{2} (53.9 sq mi), and has an average elevation of 415 m (1,362 ft). According to the 2012 census, the ward has a total population of 8,730. The ward seat is Kibata village. The ward was the first place the Matumbi attacked the akida seat and killed a German settler sparking the Maji Maji Revolt of 1905.
