= Mavuji River =

River in Kilwa District of Lindi Region

- Native name: Mto Mavuji (Swahili)

Location
- Country: Tanzania

Physical characteristics
- Source
  - location: Nanjirinji, Kilwa District
- Mouth
  - location: Indian Ocean
  - coordinates: 8°56′39″S 39°32′21″E

Mavuji River is located in entirely in Kilwa District of Lindi Region, Tanzania. It begins in Nanjirinji ward and drains on the Indian Ocean on the shore of Mandawa ward. The river is the fourth largest and longest in Lindi region .
