= Machinga people =

Ethnic group from Lindi Region, Tanzania

Machinga
Regions with significant populations
- Tanzania: 36,000 (1987)

Languages
- Matumbi language

Religion
- Islam

Related ethnic groups
- Matumbi people, Mwera, other Bantu peoples

The Machinga are a Bantu ethnic and linguistic group native to Kilwa District of Lindi Region on the southern Indian Ocean coast of Tanzania. In 1987 the Machinga population was estimated to be 36,000 people.
