= Ruangwa District =

District of Lindi Region, Tanzania

Ruangwa Wilaya ya Ruangwa (Swahili)
- District
- Ruangwa District of Lindi Region
- Coordinates: 10.0663°S 38.94047°E
- Country: Tanzania
- Region: Lindi Region
- District: Ruangwa District

Government
  - Type: Council
  - Chairman: Andrea Chikongwe
  - Director: Frank Fabian Chonya

Area
  - Total: 2,516 km^{2} (971 sq mi)

Population (2016)
  - Total: 136,065
  - Density: 54.08/km^{2} (140.1/sq mi)
- Time zone: EAT
- Postcode: 65xxx
- Area code: 023
- Website: zzzz District Website

Ruangwa is one of six districts of the Lindi Region of Tanzania. It is bordered to the north by the Kilwa District, to the south by the Mtwara Region and to the west by the Nachingwea District.

In 2016 the Tanzania National Bureau of Statistics report there were 136,065 people in the district, from 131,080 in 2012.

== Development ==
The region boasts an abundance of minerals and a huge agricultural potential. Being in the Ruvuma basin it has large deposits of graphite and uranium, among other commercially demanded minerals. With the discovery of minerals, the area has seen an influx of people working in the sector. This has put a pressure on existing social amenities such as hotels, guest houses and lodges. The road network is still poor as tarmac is less than 5 kilometers. The prime minister being the member of parliament for the area, rapid developments are expected as works on the road linking Ruangwa to Masasi are being constructed to tarmac level.

== Wards ==
The Ruangwa District is administratively divided into 21 wards:

- Chibula
- Chienjere
- Chinongwe
- Chunyu
- Likunja
- Luchelegwa
- Makanjiro
- Malolo
- Mandarawe
- Mandawa
- Matambarale
- Mbekenyera
- Mnacho
- Nachingwea
- Nambilanje
- Namichiga
- Nandagala
- Nanganga
- Narung'ombe
- Mbwemkuru
- Nkowe
- Ruangwa

== Notable persons from Ruangwa District ==
- Kassim Majaliwa, 10th Tanzanian Prime Minister
