= Nachingwea District =

District of Lindi Region, Tanzania

Coordinates: 10.3818°S 38.7611°E

Nachingwea District Wilaya ya Nachingwea
- District
- Nachingwea District of Lindi Region
- Country: Tanzania
- Zone: Coastal
- Region: Lindi

Area
  - Total: 5,974 km^{2} (2,307 sq mi)

Population (2022)
  - Total: 233,655
  - Density: 39.11/km^{2} (101.3/sq mi)
- Time zone: UTC+3 (EAT)
- Postcode: 653xx

Nachingwea is a district in the Lindi Region of Tanzania. The district is bordered to the north by the Ruangwa District, to the east by the Lindi Rural District, to the south-east by the Mtwara Region, and to the south-west by the Ruvuma Region.

According to the 2022 national census, the Nachingwea District had a population of 233,655.

The district has a hospital, a teachers' training college, a secondary school, four primary schools, a nursery school, and a day care centre. Nachingwea Airport and an army barracks also are in the district. The district was one of the centres for the groundnut scheme in the 1950s.

The Nachingwea Medal is named after this place.

== Twinnings ==
The Anglican Parish of St. Andrew is linked with St. Andrew's Church, Stapleford, Cambridgeshire in the United Kingdom.

== Wards ==
The district is divided administratively into the following 26 wards:

1. Chiola
2. Kiegei
3. Kilima Rondo
4. Kilimani Hewa
5. Kipara Mnero
6. Lionja
7. Marambo
8. Matekwe
9. Mbondo
10. Mkoka
11. Mkotokuyana
12. Mnero Miembeni
13. Mnerongongo
14. Mpiruka
15. Mtua
16. Naipanga
17. Naipingo
18. Namapwia
19. Namatula
20. Nambambo
21. Namikango
22. Nangowe
23. Nditi
24. Ndomoni
25. Ruponda
26. Stesheni
