= Liwale District =

District of Lindi Region, Tanzania

Coordinates: 9°46′S 37°56′E

Liwale District Wilaya ya Liwale
- District
- Liwale District of Lindi Region
- Country: Tanzania
- Zone: Coastal

Area
  - Total: 34,311 km^{2} (13,248 sq mi)

Population (2022 census)
  - Total: 136,505
  - Density: 3.9785/km^{2} (10.304/sq mi)

Liwale is one of the six districts of the Lindi Region of Tanzania. It is the largest district in Lindi and one of the largest in districts in Tanzania. It is bordered to the north by the Pwani Region, to the east by the Kilwa District, to the south by the Ruangwa District and to the west by the Morogoro Region. Most of Liwale district is within the Nyerere National Park.

According to the 2022 Tanzania National Census, the population of the Liwale District was 136,505.

== History ==
Liwale is the ancestral home to the Ngindo People. On the onset of Maji Maji Rebellion on August 15, 1905, Ngindo rebels took Liwale, killing six Askaris and two German colonists. In April 2013, there was rioting in Liwale over the levels of payments made for cashew nuts. Police used tear gas and a helicopter to control the riots. Approximately 20 houses were burnt down.

== Wards ==
The Liwale District is administratively divided into 20 wards:

- Barikiwa
- Kiangara
- Kibutuka
- Kimambi
- Liwale 'B'
- Liwale Mjini
- Makata
- Mangirikiti
- Mbaya
- Mihumo
- Mirui
- Mkutano (English meaning: meeting)
- Mlembwe
- Mpigamiti
- Nangano
- Ngongowele
- Likongowele
- Nangando
- Lilombe
- Kichonda
