= Mwera people =

Ethnic group from Lindi Region of Tanzania

Total population
- c. 469,000 (2001)

Regions with significant populations
- Tanzania: 385,000 (2009)
- Mozambique: Unknown

Languages
- Mwera language, Swahili

Religion
- Majority Sunni Islam (small minorities of Christianity and African Traditional Religion)

The Mwera people are a Bantu ethnic and linguistic group. They are native to Ruangwa and Nachingwea districts in Lindi Region. However they have also settled in northern Mtwara Region and eastern Ruvuma Region of Tanzania, as well as along the Ruvuma River between Tanzania and Mozambique.

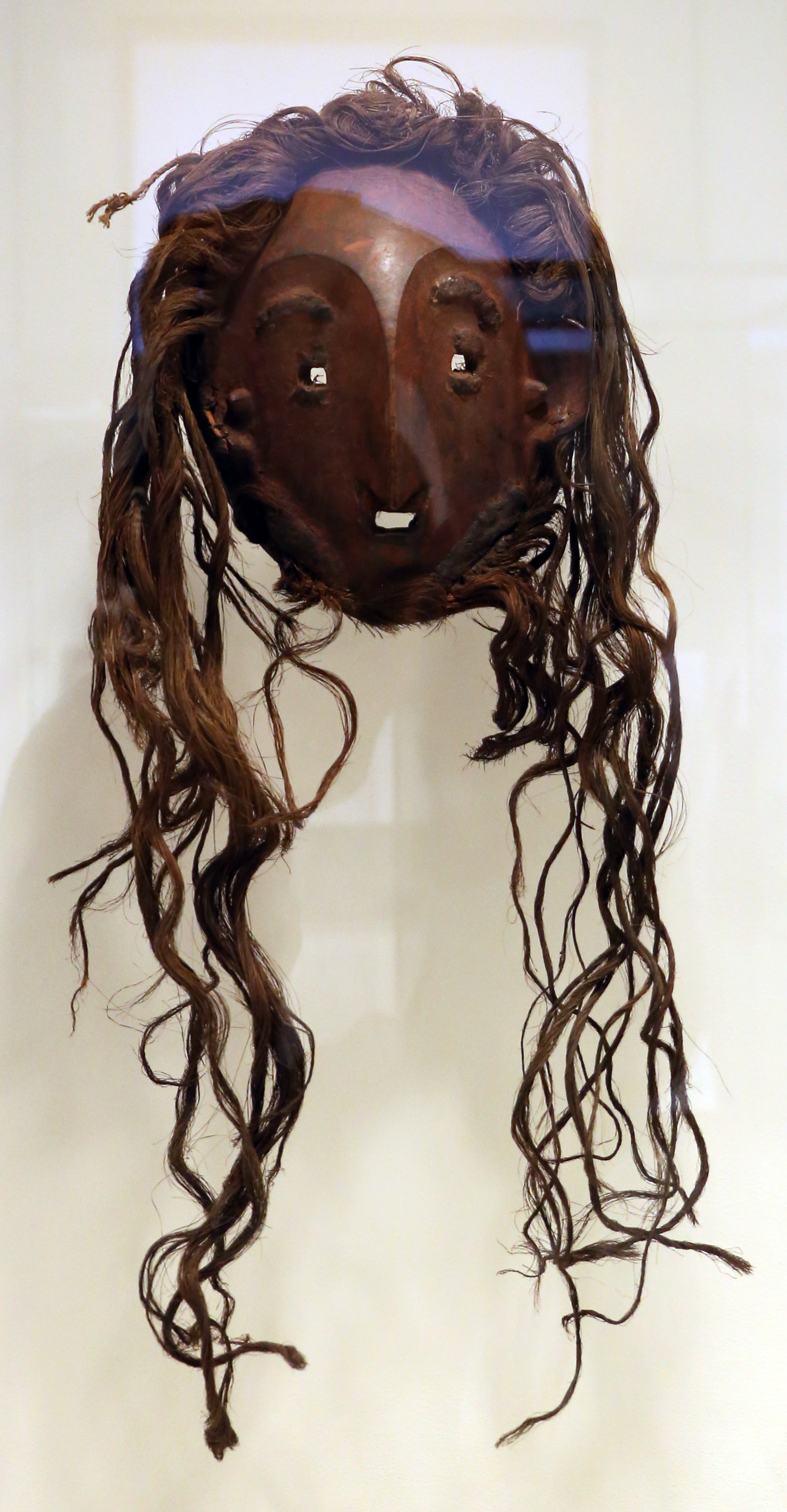
Mwera ceremonial Mask, Kilwa, Tanzania,

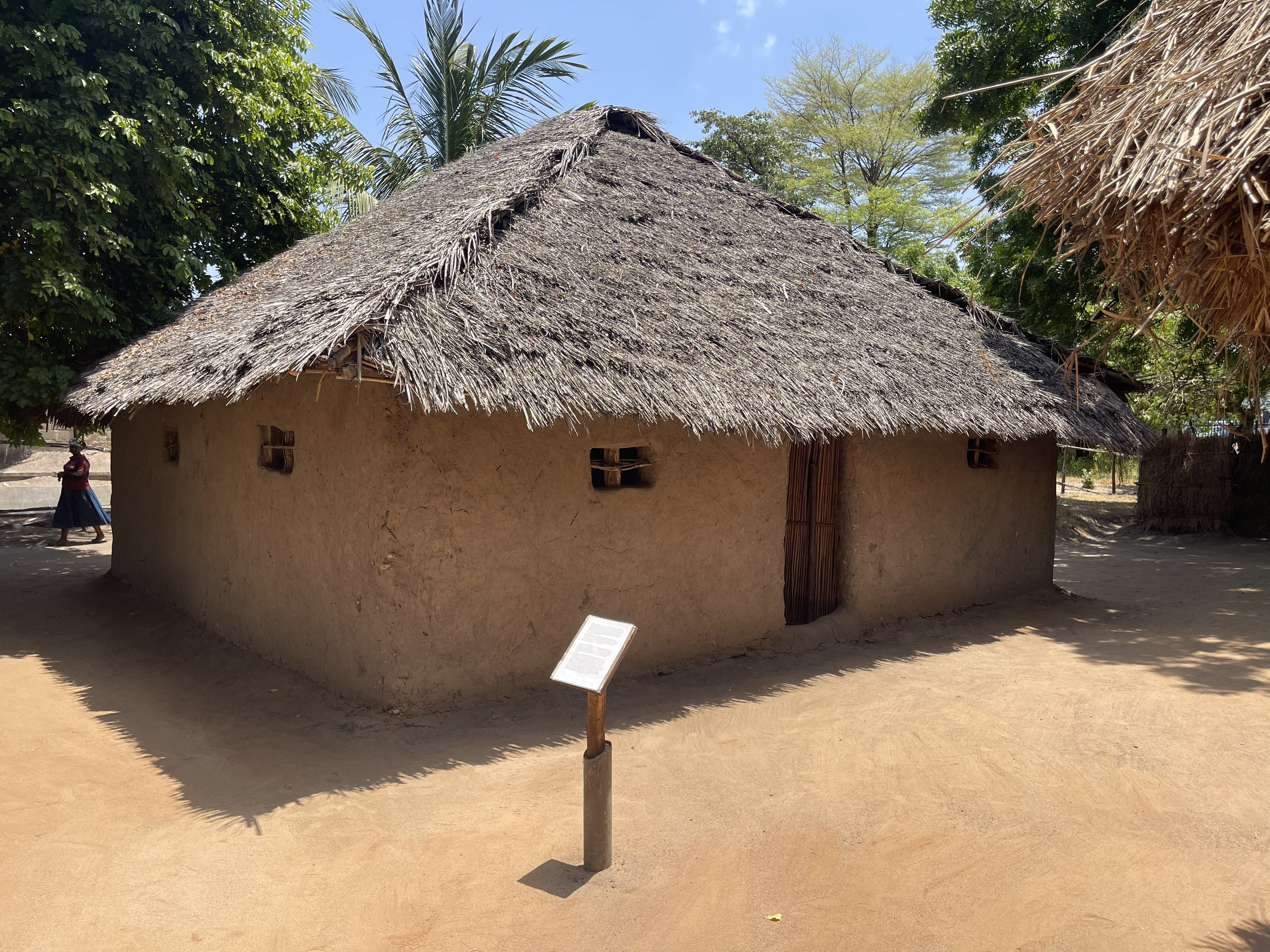
Outside look of a traditional house used by Mwera Tribe in Tanzania

According to their oral traditions, the Mwera people are a Bantu people who originated around Lake Albert in north Uganda. They migrated south in the late medieval era, and reached Lake Malawi (Nyasa). There they settled into two communities: the Mwera near Nyasa, and the coastal Mwera, who settled between the Lake and the Indian Ocean coast. The word "Mwera" literally means "inland dwellers" (far from coast). Those Mwera who live on the coast are called "Wamwera" by other Mwera people. They are known to be peaceful people, whose migration and population distribution has been historically affected by violence and seizure inflicted on them.

In 2001, the Mwera population was estimated to number 469,000. They speak the Mwera language, also called Kimwera, Mwela or Chimwera. This is a Bantu language that is part of the Niger-Congo family of languages. The Mwera language contains a hodiernal tense.

== Religion ==
The Mwera people have had a Traditional Religion that existed through the 19th century. With the arrival of the German colonial rule of Tanzania, the German Christian missionaries introduced Christianity among the Mwera, and gained converts. However, after the World War I, the British colonial rule of Tanzania began, which expelled all German missionaries. The Mwera missions were abandoned, Islamic missionaries filled the gap particularly in the coastal regions, gained Muslim converts and introduced polygyny among the Mwera people. Most contemporary Mwera adhere to Sunni Islam with small minorities practicing Christianity or their traditional religion.

== Society and culture ==
The Mwera do not keep cattle or domestic animals, as their traditional region has been infested with Tsetse flies. They have hunted and fished instead. They live in clusters of oval huts made from wooden poles, grass thatch and local mud. In contemporary society, the Mwera have adopted subsistence farming. A growing number of Mwera have also migrated to cities and work as wage laborers.

Storytelling and riddles are important facets of the Mwera culture. They have rites of passage, such as Likomanga for boys, and Chikwembo for girls, which marks their entry into adulthood followed by a quick marriage shortly after the initiation.

Historically, women of the Mwera culture were known for their use of the lip plate, in which the upper lip was pierced in girlhood and gradually enlarged over time to hold various sizes of solid plugs. In this way they shared similarities with the neighboring Makonde people.

=== Music ===
The Mwera people, like the Makonde people who share the Rovuma valley, have a historic musical tradition. Their seven metal key lamellophone is notable, and is called a Luliimba. This device is notable because its design and construction features are strikingly similar to Saron found in Southeast Asia and South Asia, suggesting a possible historic cultural exchange between the coastal southern Africa and the coastal southeast Asia. It is unclear if the exchange was from Africa to Asia, or vice versa.

== Ways of Life ==
The Mwera area is one of the most sparsely populated regions in Tanzania with only ten people per square kilometer. Rainfall is very light and the rivers flowing through their homeland dry up during the dry season forcing people to depend on waterholes for their normal supply of water.

"Mwera" is a word which means "those living in the mainland" far from the coast. Generally Mwera are known to be very peaceful. They live in small oval-shaped huts with grass thatched roofs. Building a Mwera house is a family project. The men cut poles for framing the house, the women gather grass for thatching the roof and the young boys dig clay used to fill in the mud walls.

Tradition dictates that certain tree species cannot be used for building houses. It seems the reason for this ban is the belief that an evil spirit would haunt such a house. The apparent benefit of the prohibition is protecting those selected trees from extinction.

The Mwera are mainly subsistence farmers with beautiful fields of maize and peanuts. Due to tsetse flies it is impossible to raise cattle. They get most of their meat from hunting and fishing. Cashew nuts are the main cash crop but marketing charcoal is good income too for those living within 20 kilometers of coastal cities.

The Mwera are a matrilineal society in which marriage requires the husband to move to the wife's premises. The children are named after the mother's brother, the maternal uncle who is responsible for important rituals and ceremonies. Both boys and girls go through traditional initiation rites which moulds their cultural identities as men and women.

Leisure time is filled with drinking tea and loitering around the shops in the market at the center of the village. It is a time to visit, play games, tell stories and take care of business.
