= Matumbi people =

Ethnic group from Lindi Region of Tanzania

Matumbi
Regions with significant populations
- Tanzania: 72,000 (1978)

Languages
- Matumbi language

Religion
- Islam

Related ethnic groups
- Machinga, Mwera, other Bantu peoples

The Matumbi are a Bantu ethnolinguistic group native to Kilwa District, Lindi Region in southern Tanzania, who speak the Matumbi language. They are also the native inhabitants of the Songosongo island archipelago. Their homeland is also south of the Rufiji delta in southern Pwani Region in Rufiji District. In 1978 the Matumbi population was estimated to number 72,000. They are the largest ethnic group in Kilwa District. The Matumbi Highlands are named after them.

== Culture ==
The Matumbi are mainly farmers and the ones that settled on the coast and Songosongo Islands are fishermen. Crops grown by Matumbi include rice and coconuts. For livestock they raise goats and poultry.

Like many groups in the world, the Matumbi are a patrilineal society. The Matumbi are adherents of Islam.
