= List of islands in the Indian Ocean =

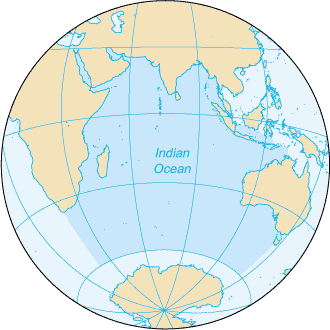

The islands of the Indian Ocean are part of either the eastern, western, or southern areas. Some prominently large islands include Madagascar, Sri Lanka, and the Indonesian islands of Sumatra, Java, and Lesser Sunda Islands.

== Eastern Indian Ocean ==
- Andaman Islands (India)
- Ashmore and Cartier Islands (Australia)
- Buccaneer Archipelago (Australia)
- Bird Island (Australia)
- Carnac Island (Australia)
- Christmas Island (Australia)
- Cocos (Keeling) Islands (Australia)
- Dirk Hartog Island (Australia)
- Enggano Island (Indonesia)
- Garden Island (Australia)
- Houtman Abrolhos (Australia)
- Langkawi Islands (Malaysia)
- Little Island (Australia)
- Mannar Island (Sri Lanka)
- Mentawai Islands (Indonesia)
- Mergui Archipelago (Myanmar)
- Nias Island (Indonesia)
- Nicobar Islands (India)
- Pamban Island (India)
- Penang Island (Malaysia)
- Penguin Island (Australia)
- Phi Phi Islands (Thailand)
- Phuket (Thailand)
- Rosemary Island (Australia)
- Rottnest Island (Australia)
- Sabang (Indonesia)
- Sri Lanka
- Seal Island (Encounter Bay) (Australia)
- Seal Island (Investigator Strait) (Australia)
- Shag Island (Australia)
- Simeulue Island (Indonesia)
- St. Mary's Islands (India)
- Trigg Island (Australia)

== Western Indian Ocean ==
- Bajuni Islands (Somalia)
- Bazaruto Archipelago (Mozambique)
- Chagos Archipelago (including Diego Garcia) (UK transitioning to Mauritius)
- Comoros
- Khuriya Muriya Islands (Oman)
- Lakshadweep Archipelago (India)
- Lamu Archipelago (Kenya)
- Madagascar
- Tanzania

- Bongoyo Island
- Mbudya Island
- Pangavini Island
- Mafia Archipelago (Tanzania)
- Mafia Island
- Juani Island
- Jibondo Island
- Chole Island
- Barakuni Island
- Niororo Island
- Miewi Island
- Zanzibar Archipelago (Tanzania)
- Zanzibar
- Tumbatu Island
- Pemba Island
- Yambe Island
- Maziwe Island
- Kwale Island
- Songosongo Archipelago (Tanzania)
- Songo Songo Island
- Okuza Island
- Nyuni Island

- Maldives
- Mauritius

- Agaléga Islands
- Cargados Carajos (St. Brandon)
- Rodrigues

- Mayotte (France)
- Quirimbas Archipelago (Mozambique)
- Réunion (France)
- Seychelles

- La Digue Island
- Mahé, Seychelles
- Praslin Island
- Silhouette Island

- Saad ad-Din Islands (Somalia)
- Scattered Islands in the Indian Ocean (France)

- Banc du Geyser
- Bassas da India
- Europa Island
- Glorioso Islands
- Juan de Nova Island
- Tromelin Island

- Socotra Island (Yemen)
- Vypin Island (India)
- Vamizi Island (Mozambique)
- Vallarpadam (India)
- Willingdon Island (India)

== Southern Indian Ocean ==
- Heard Island and McDonald Islands (Australia)
- Île Amsterdam, home to the research station Martin-de-Viviès (France)
- Île Saint-Paul (France)
- Kerguelen Islands (France)
- Prince Edward Islands (South Africa)

- Marion Island
- Prince Edward Island

== See also ==
- List of islands of Antarctica and the Southern Ocean — on the south.
- List of islands in the Atlantic Ocean — on the southwest.
- List of islands in the Pacific Ocean — on the east.
- Lists of islands
