= Kendwa Island =

Protected island of Kigamboni District in the Dar es Salaam Region of Tanzania

- IUCN category II (national park)
- Location within Tanzania
- Location: Tanzania, Dar es Salaam Region, Kigamboni District
- Nearest city: Dar es Salaam
- Coordinates: 6°47′56″S 39°19′51″E
- Area: 5.30 km^{2} (2.05 sq mi)
- Established: March 2007
- Governing body: Marine Parks & Reserves Authority (Tanzania)
- Website: DMRS

Kendwa Island (Kisiwa cha Kendwa, in Swahili) is a protected, uninhabited island in the Sea of Zanj under the Dar es Salaam Marine Reserve (DMRS) with the IUCN category II located within Kigamboni District of Dar es Salaam Region in Tanzania. The islands reserve measures around 5.30km2. The Sinda Island is to the east of the island, the Makatumbi Islands are to the north, and the Kigamboni ward of Kigamboni is to the west. The island is home to endangered coconunt crabs.

== See also ==
- Tanzania Marine Parks and Reserves Unit
- List of protected areas of Tanzania
