= Fanjove Island =

Island in the Songosongo Islands of Kilwa District, Lindi Region

- Location on the Mafia Archipelago

Geography
- Location: Sea of Zanj
- Coordinates: 8°34′0.12″S 39°34′0.12″E
- Archipelago: The Songosongo Archipelago
- Area: 1 km^{2} (0.39 sq mi)
- Length: 1.0 km (0.62 mi)
- Width: 0.4 km (0.25 mi)

Administration
- Tanzania
- Region: Lindi Region
- District: Kilwa District
- Ward: Songosongo

Demographics
- Languages: Swahili
- Ethnic groups: Matumbi

Fanjove Island (Kisiwa cha Fanjove, in Swahili) is a coral island in the Songosongo Archipelago. The island is governed by the Songosongo ward in Kilwa District of Lindi Region in Tanzania's Indian ocean coast. The island is a geographically part of the Songosongo Islands archipelago which is composed of 22 reefs and 4 islands. The other three islands in the archipelago are Songo Songo, Nyuni Island and Okuza Island. The is land is originally been uninhabited, thus it has been leased to a luxury hotelier by the Tanzanian government. On January 12, 2000, 11 Indo-Pacific bottlenose dolphin that had become live-stranded on Fanjove Island were reported as having been refloated and released.

== Conservation ==
Sea Sense, a conservation group, visited Fanjove Island in Kilwa District after learning that multiple green turtle nests had been established there in 2010. There were numerous security guards on the island who had reported the nests; the island is currently being developed by a tour operator. However, a number of the nests they documented in 2010 had failed as a result of tide flooding. Sea Sense offered hands-on training courses to improve knowledge of nest identification, translocation procedures, post-hatching excavations, and hatching Codes of Conduct in order to increase the survival rates of future nests. Theoretical instruction in the biology and life history of sea turtles served as a support for this training.
