= Karange Island =

Protected island and marine reserve in Tanga Region of Tanzania

- IUCN category II (national park)
- Location within Tanzania
- Location: Tanzania, Tanga Region, Tanga District; Tongoni
- Nearest city: Tanga
- Coordinates: 5°12′18″S 39°08′18″E
- Length: 11.0 km (6.8 mi)
- Width: 2.4 km (1.5 mi)
- Area: 16 km^{2} (6.2 sq mi)
- Established: 2010
- Governing body: Marine Parks & Reserves Authority (Tanzania)
- Website: Tanga Coelacanth Marine Park

Karange Island (Kisiwa cha Karange, in Swahili) is a small uninhabited and protected island in Mtangata Bay of Tongoni in Tanga District of Tanga Region, Tanzania. The island is located entirely with the Tanga Coelacanth Marine Park (TCMP). The island is administered by Tanzania Marine Parks and Reserves.
