= H.M. Rawat =

- Industry: Trade and Commerce
- Founder: Hassam Moussa Hossen Rawat
- Headquarters: Port-Louis, Mauritius
- Area served: Mauritius; Madagascar; Réunion; Seychelles; Middle East; Europe
- Key people: President; Mohamad Ameen H. Rawat Group CEO Mohamad Ali H. Rawat
- Products: Mobile phones luxury cars sports apparel home design furniture
- Services: Mobile Telecommunications
- Website: http://www.hmrawat.com

H.M. Rawat Corporate, was established in 1959 and trades in the IOI (Indian Ocean Islands region; Reunion Island, Mauritius, Madagascar, Seychelles) with sub offices overseas. Based in Port-Louis, the company engages in the import of luxury and general goods, machinery, fast food, catering, hotel, agriculture and brand mobile phones.

The Rawat family have been established in Mauritius and other countries for over 120 years. With the arrival of Ismael Hossen Rawat, patriarch of the Rawat family proclaimed to have ancestral origins from Surat province of Gujarat in western India, and is credited for developing Mauritian cinema into a flourishing industry with the acquisition of the Port Louis Theatre and Variety Show Co from Antoine Guerin, in 1922. The group today is led by the two sons of Hassam Moussa Rawat: Group Chairman & CEO, Mr Mohamad Ameen H. Rawat, and Group CEO, brother Mr. Mohamad Ali H. Rawat, who both joined the family enterprise in 1982 and launched their Mobile Telecommunications sector in 2000.

The group now have the only Nokia Concept Store in all of Sub-Saharan Africa, and are in the process of breaking into a new market venture with “Renewable Energy” business unit, in line with Mauritius government policy of “Maurice Ile Durable”, which will design, supply, build and maintain on-grid and off-grid solar photovoltaic power plants to domestic, corporate, institutional and public sectors.

== History ==
=== Golden Age of Cinema ===
HM Rawat started by opening network of movie theaters and film distribution in 1930. Movie - going was the most popular form of entertainment in that era when there were no TV, computers, video players or DVDs, satellite channels etc. Later, in 1965, Hassam Moussa Rawat, Moussa I. Rawat's son, founded his own company which was named Hassam Moussa Rawat, Importers & Merchants.

=== Modernising Bakeries ===
In the 1960s Hassam Moussa Rawat toured Europe and the Middle East to prospect for new products and look for new opportunities. It is thus that Hassam Moussa Rawat, Importers & Merchants, ordered and had the first electromechanical equipment in the Mauritian Bakeries. The company also offered equipment for pastry-making, tea rooms, ice creams parlors and snack bar.

In the 1970s the 1980s, Hassam Moussa Importers & Merchants introduced a purchase system for the supply of equipment for its clients.

=== Technology boom ===
In the late 1990s, HM Rawat Group ventured into developing the technology sector of the island. Acquiring the distributorship of world-renowned mobile phone brands for the region. HM Rawat is also a contributing factor to developing the ICT sector of the country, by working closely with the Information and Communication Technologies Authority of Mauritius.
