= Tanga Island Front Range Lighthouse =

Tanga Island Front Range Light
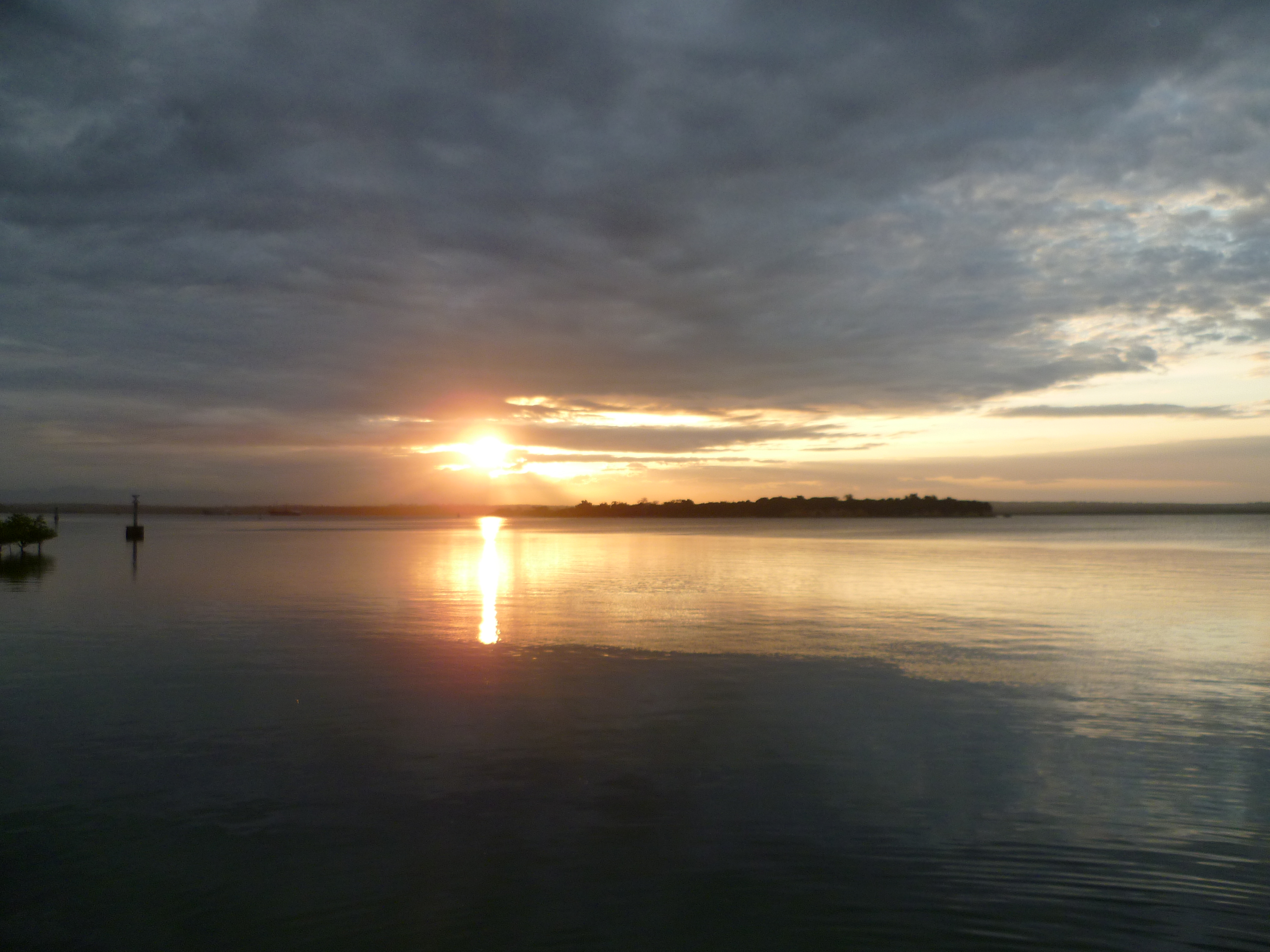
- The lighthouse lies within the Tanga Bay
- Location: Tanga; Tanzania
- Coordinates: 5°3′42.7″S 39°6′47.5″E

Tower
- Construction: concrete tower
- Height: 12 metres (39 ft)
- Shape: cylindrical tower
- Operator: Tanzania Ports Authority

Light
- Focal height: 12 metres (39 ft)
- Range: 7 nautical miles (13 km; 8.1 mi)
- Characteristic: Fl W 2s.

The Tanga Island Front Range Lighthouse is located in the northeastern city of Tanga in Tanga City Council of Tanga Region in Tanzania. The lighthouse is located on Tanga Island as its name sugguests.

== See also ==
- List of lighthouses in Tanzania
