= Kimbubu Island =

Protected island of Kigamboni District in the Dar es Salaam Region of Tanzania

- IUCN category II (national park)
- Location within Tanzania
- Location: Tanzania, Dar es Salaam Region, Kigamboni District
- Nearest city: Dar es Salaam
- Coordinates: 6°49′16″S 39°21′19″E
- Area: 4.7 km^{2} (1.8 sq mi)
- Established: March 2007
- Governing body: Marine Parks & Reserves Authority (Tanzania)
- Website: DMRS

Kimbubu Island (Kisiwa cha Kimbubu, in Swahili) is a protected, uninhabited island in the Sea of Zanj under the Dar es Salaam Marine Reserve (DMRS) with the IUCN category II located within Kigamboni District of Dar es Salaam Region in Tanzania. The islands reserve measures around 4.7km2. East of the island is Sinda Island, north is the Makatumbi Islands and west is the Mjimwema ward of Kigamboni.

== See also ==
- Tanzania Marine Parks and Reserves Unit
- List of protected areas of Tanzania
