= Tanga Island =

Protected island and marine reserve in Tanga Region of Tanzania

- IUCN category II (national park)
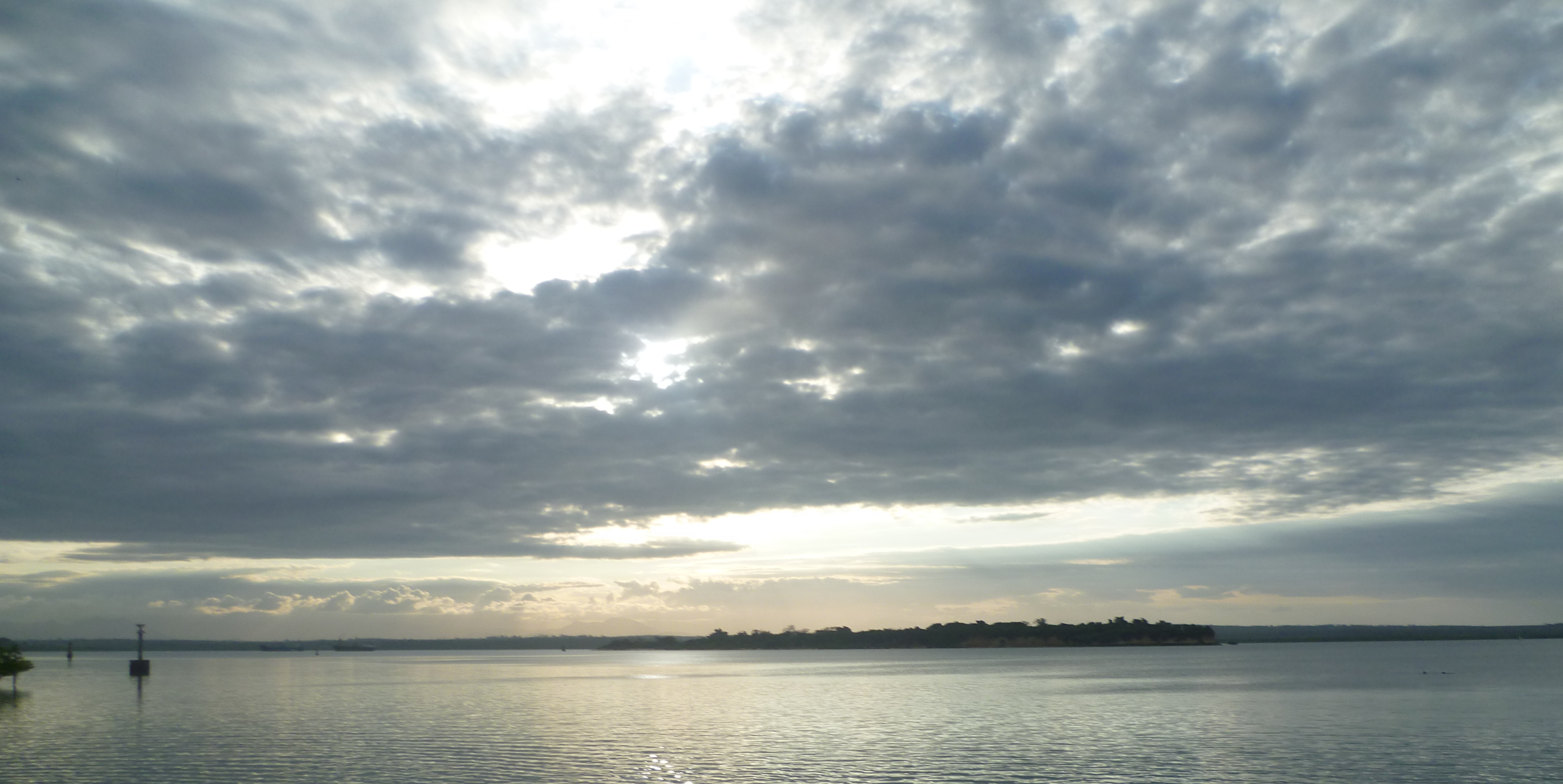
- Island within Tanga bay

- Location within Tanzania
- Location: Tanzania, Tanga Region, Tanga District
- Nearest city: Tanga
- Coordinates: 5°3′20.29″S 39°6′27.11″E
- Length: 1.0 km (0.62 mi)
- Width: 0.2 km (0.12 mi)
- Established: 2010
- Governing body: Marine Parks & Reserves Authority (Tanzania)
- Website: Tanga Coelacanth Marine Park

Tanga Island known during German East Africa as Toten Island in old colonial maps (Swahili Toten, adapted from German Toteninsel, meaning "Island of the Dead") is a small uninhabited and protected island situated north of the city of Tanga's harbour on Tanga Bay in Tanga Region, Tanzania. It is within the Tanga Bay. The island is located entirely with the Tanga Coelacanth Marine Park (TCMP). The island is administered by Tanzania Marine Parks and Reserves.

== Historical Site ==
The island is a historical site that contains ruins of two Medieval Swahili mosques and tombs. The current name comes from the German word for "dead bodies" alluding to the numerous graves on the island. Until 1854 Toten Island was still inhabited by people. In 1884 the remaining people moved to what is present day Tanga city.

== See also ==
- Historic Swahili Settlements
- National Historic Sites in Tanzania
- Swahili architecture
