= Fungu Yasini Island =

Protected island of Kinondoni District in the Dar es Salaam Region of Tanzania

- IUCN category II (national park)
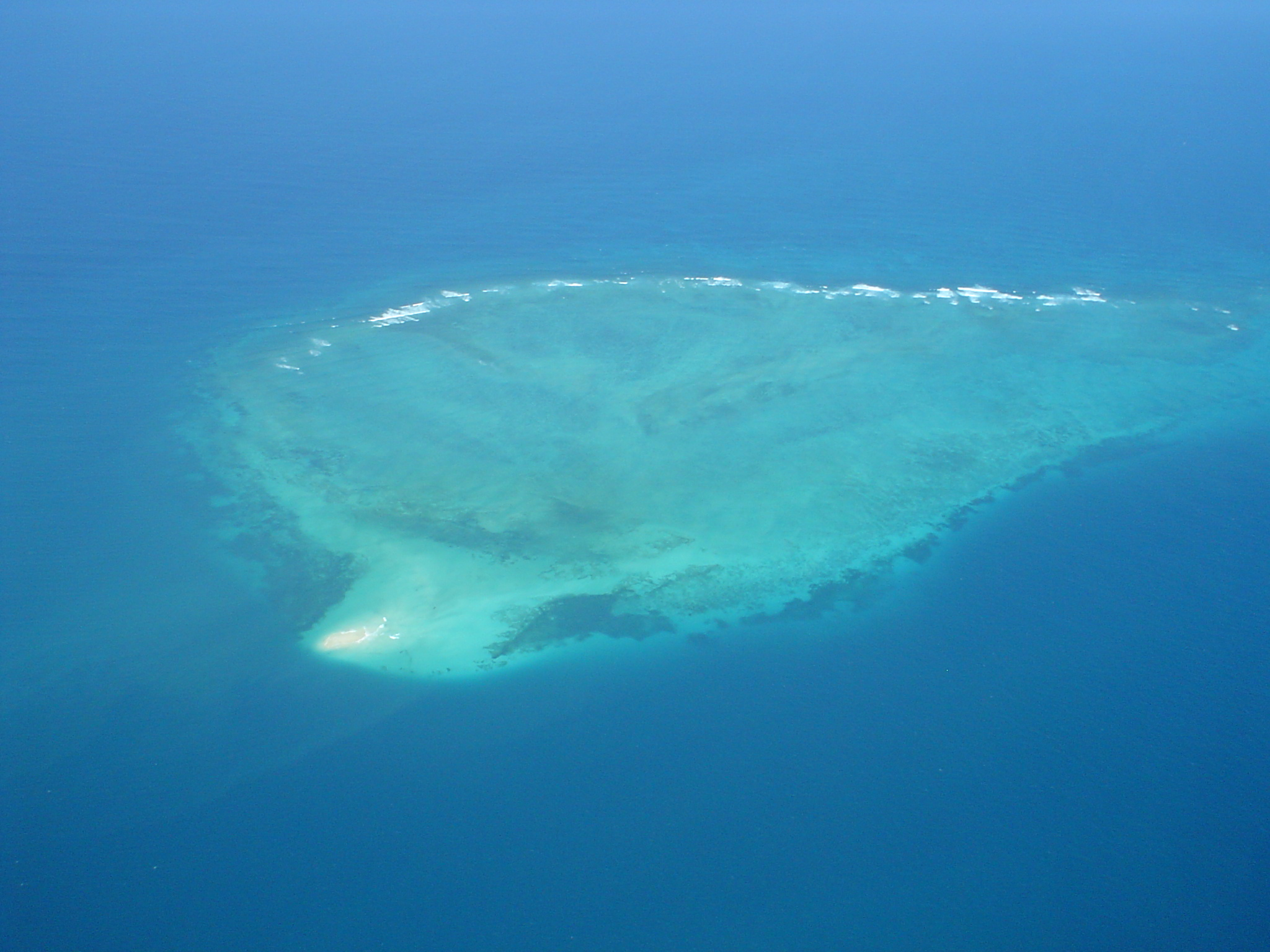
- Fungu Yasini reef

- Location within Tanzania
- Location: Tanzania, Dar es Salaam Region, Kinondoni District
- Nearest city: Dar es Salaam
- Coordinates: 6°35′39″S 39°13′26″E
- Area: 22.90 km^{2} (8.84 sq mi)
- Established: 1975
- Governing body: Marine Parks & Reserves Authority (Tanzania)
- Website: DMRS

Fungu Yasini Island (Kisiwa cha Fungu Yasini, in Swahili) is a protected, uninhabited island under the Dar es Salaam Marine Reserve (DMRS) with the IUCN category II located within Kinondoni District of Dar es Salaam Region in Tanzania. The island reserve measures around 22.90km2 with most it underwater as a reef. South of the island is Mbudya Island.

== Overview ==
This marine reserve is distinct because it is an island-like sand bank that can only be viewed at low tide and has no vegetation. On the west and north sides of the lower intertidal zone, there is a lot of sea grass mixed in with patches of coral. Lower intertidal regions in the southeast are rocky.

This marine reserve stands out because it is an island-like sand bank with no vegetation that can only be seen at low tide. It is located in the northern part of Dar es Salaam, immediately following Mbudya Island Marine Reserve. Sea grass and coral patchy areas coexist on the west and north edges of the lower intertidal zone. Southeasterly lower intertidal areas are rocky.

More than 35% of the island's coral cover is found in two sites, one on the southwest waters of less than 10 m (108,320 m2) and the other on the deeper waters (462,765 m2), where coral reefs can be found. Similar to other DMRS islands, Thalassia hemprichii and Thallasodentron ciliatum are the two most common species of sea grass. Sea cucumbers, octopuses, sea urchins, giant clams, rock crabs, tigger cowries, starfish, cushion stars, and nudibranchs are some of the creatures that can be found in the intertidal flats.

== See also ==
- Tanzania Marine Parks and Reserves Unit
- List of protected areas of Tanzania
