= Yambe Island =

Medieval Swahili settlement and island in Tanga Region

- Kisiwa Kale cha Yambe
- Location within Tanzania
- 5°6′50.04″S 39°9′34.56″E
- Type: Settlement
- Cultures: Swahili
- Location: Tanga District, Tanga Region, Tanzania
- Part of: Swahili Culture

History
- Built: 10th century AD
- Abandoned: unknown

Site notes
- Material: Coral rag
- Excavation dates: none
- Condition: Endangered
- Owner: Tanzanian Government
- Management: Antiquities Division, Ministry of Natural Resources and Tourism
- Public access: Yes

National Historic Sites of Tanzania
- Official name: Yambe Historic Settlement
- Type: Cultural

Yambe Island (Swahili: Kisiwa cha Yambe) is protected, uninhabited historic island located directly east of the city of Tanga in Tanga District of Tanga Region in Tanzania. It is the largest island in Tanga region. It is located entirely with the Tanga Coelacanth Marine Park (TCMP). The island is administered by Tanzania Marine Parks and Reserves. The island is also home to medieval Swahili ruins that have yet to be excavated.

== See also ==
- Historic Swahili Settlements
- National Historic Sites in Tanzania
- Swahili architecture
