= Tanzanair =

- Founded: 1969
- AOC #: 002
- Hubs: Julius Nyerere International Airport
- Fleet size: 11
- Headquarters: Dar es Salaam, Tanzania
- Key people: John Dinos Samaras (Managing Director)
- Website: Company website

Tanzanian Air Services Ltd, operating as Tanzanair, is an air charter company in Tanzania. Founded in 1969 by Dinos John Samaras, it was the first private air operator in the country. It has an engineering facility near Terminal I of the Julius Nyerere International Airport for aircraft maintenance. It is also an authorised Cessna service centre.

== Fleet ==
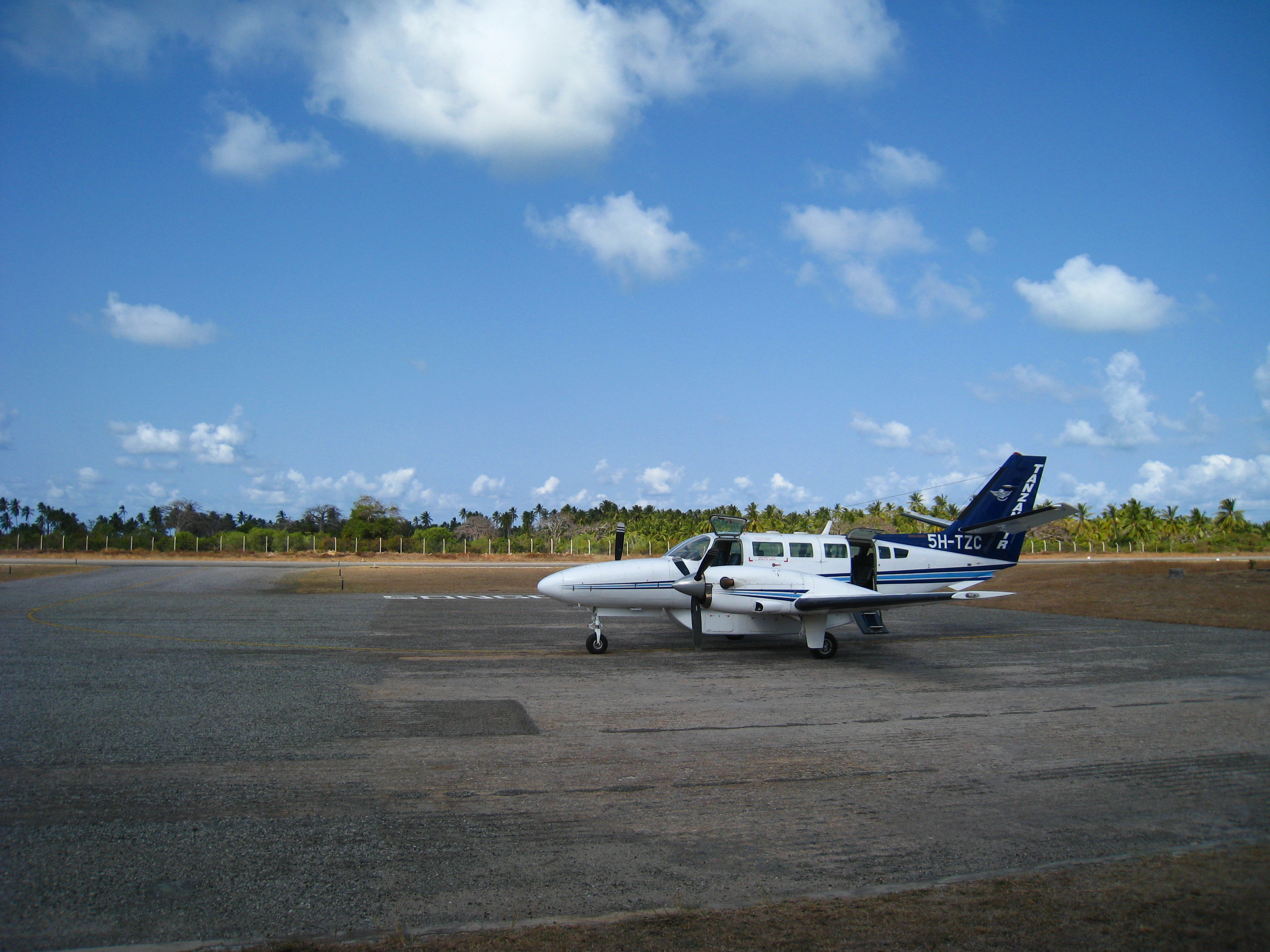
A Tanzanair aircraft at Songo Songo Airstrip

The Tanzanair fleet consists of the following aircraft (as of October 2012):

Tanzanair fleet
Aircraft	In service	Passengers	Notes
Agusta A109S	1	6	
Beechcraft 1900D	2	18	
Beechcraft King Air 200	2	8/11	
Beechcraft King Air 350	1		
Cessna 206	1	5	
Cessna 208 Caravan	2	9/13	
Reims F406 Caravan II	2	12	
Total	11		

== Accidents and incidents ==
- 22 August 2013: A Beechcraft B200C Super King Air (registration 5H-TZW) on a charter flight from Bukoba to Zanzibar, force-landed in Lake Manyara following a loss of engine power. The pilot announced he had lost one engine at 21,000 feet while en route and he decided to divert to Arusha. During the descent, at 16,000 feet, the remaining engine also seized. He then ditched the plane in Lake Manyara. All aboard (6 passengers and the pilot) were rescued by fishermen.
