= Dar es Salaam Marine Reserve =

Group of marine wildlife reserves in Tanzania

Dar es Salaam Marine Reserve System
- (DMRS)
- IUCN category II (national park)
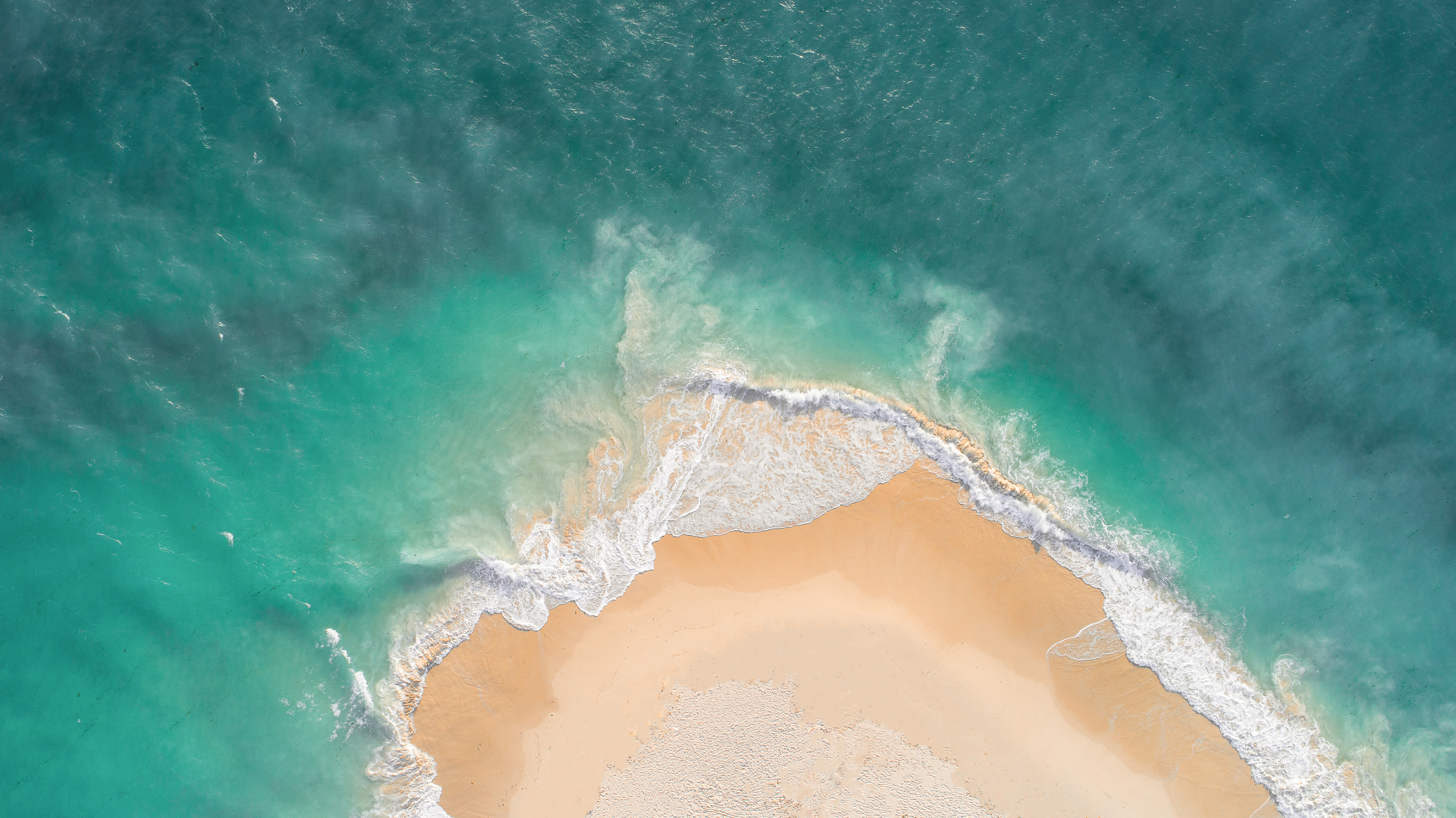
- Mbuya Island beach of the DMRS

- Location within Tanzania
- Location: Tanzania, Dar es Salaam Region, Kinondoni District
- Nearest city: Dar es Salaam
- Coordinates: 06°50′S 39°25′E
- Area: 15 km^{2} (5.8 sq mi)
- Established: 1975
- Governing body: Marine Parks & Reserves Authority (Tanzania)
- Website: DMRS

The Dar es Salaam Marine Reserve System or DMRS (Hifahdi Akiba Bahari ya Dar es Salaam, in Swahili) is a group of marine parks of Tanzania, with the IUCN category II located within Dar es Salaam Region of Tanzania. The reserve system consists of nine uninhabited islands, four located north of Dar es Salaam's Kinondoni District; (Bongoyo, Mbudya, Pangavini and Fungu Yasini) and four south of the city Makatumbi Islands, Kimbubu Island, Sinda Island and Kendwa Island in Kigamboni District. It provides protection for several important tropical ecosystems; coral reefs, mangroves and seagrass beds.

== Legal status ==
Management of the reserve is governed by the Tanzanian Board of Trustees of Marine Parks and Reserves which is the custodian and overseer of the establishment and management of the Marine Protected Reserves in Tanzania.

The Dar es Salaam Marine Reserves were first established under the Fisheries Act of 1970 and in 1998 were transferred to the Marine Parks and Reserves (MPRs), Act No. 29 of 1994. .

== Threats ==
Visits to the reserve area (especially Bongoyo and Mbudya) are a popular daytrip for both tourists and Tanzanian residents alike, the islands serving as a location for a variety of leisure activities, including snorkelling, sunbathing and hiking. However, over recent years unregulated tourist activities has led to degradation within the reserves.

The nearby fishing communities of Kunduchi, Ununio, and Msasani all appear to be heavily dependent on the resources in the reserves and resource over-exploitation is an increasing concern with local fishermen attributing a decline in fish catches over recent years to the use of small mesh nets and dynamite fishing. A decrease in the abundance of fish and coral health, and an increased amount of bleached and broken coral has been noted by divers.

== Coconut Crabs ==
On Tanzania's mainland, it appears that there are hardly any populations left, while it's likely that a few remain to the north of Dar es Salaam. In contrast, the Dar es Salaam Marine Reserve system is made up of nine tiny, uninhabited islands, six of which are known to have colonies of coconut crabs (Mbudya, Bongoyo, Pangavini, Kendwa, Sinda Island). Bongoyo Island had the largest specimens of the crabs in the country.
