= Nyuni Island =

Island in the Songosongo Islands of Kilwa District, Lindi Region

- Location on the Songosongo Archipelago

Geography
- Location: Sea of Zanj
- Coordinates: 8°22′0.12″S 39°34′0.12″E
- Archipelago: The Songosongo Archipelago
- Length: 0.6 km (0.37 mi)
- Width: 0.3 km (0.19 mi)

Administration
- Tanzania
- Region: Lindi Region
- District: Kilwa District
- Ward: Songosongo

Demographics
- Languages: Swahili
- Ethnic groups: Matumbi

Nyuni Island (Kisiwa cha Nyuni, in Swahili) is a coral island in the Songosongo Archipelago. The island is governed by the Songosongo ward in Kilwa District of Lindi Region in Tanzania's Indian ocean coast. Geographically, the island is part of the Songosongo Islands archipelago which is composed of 22 reefs and 4 islands. The other three islands are Songo Songo, Fanjove Island and Okuza Island. Nyuni island has an elevation of 14m and is under the national natural gas exploration and extraction initiative.
