= Songosongo =

Ward in Kilwa District, Lindi Region

Songosongo Kata ya Songosongo (Swahili)
- Ward
- Kata ya Songosongo, Wilaya ya Kilwa
- Location within Tanzania
- Country: Tanzania
- Region: Lindi Region
- District: Kilwa District
- Seat: Songosongo Village

Area
  - Total: 8.5 km^{2} (3.3 sq mi)
- Elevation: 15 m (49 ft)

Population (2012)
  - Total: 3,056
  - Density: 360/km^{2} (930/sq mi)

Ethnic groups
  - Settler: Swahili
  - Native: Matumbi
- Tanzanian Postal Code: 65420

Songosongo is an administrative ward in Kilwa District of Lindi Region in Tanzania. The ward covers an area of 8.5 km^{2} (3.3 sq mi), and has an average elevation of 11 m (36 ft). According to the 2012 census, the ward has a total population of 3,056. The ward administers the whole archipelago of the Songosongo Islands, which are composed of 22 coral reefs and 4 coral islands; Songo Songo Island, Fanjove Island, Nyuni Island and Okuza Island. The islands ward's native inhabitants are the Matumbi people. The archipelago is composed of 21 coral reefs including the 4 islands. The ward seat is Songosongo village. In addition there are four hamlets on the islands; Pembeni, Makondeni, Msitumani and Funguni .
