= Tanga Coelacanth Marine Park =

Group of marine wildlife reserves in Tanzania

- (TCMP)
- IUCN category II (national park)
- Location within Tanzania
- Location: Tanzania, Tanga Region, Mkinga District; Tanga District; Pangani District
- Nearest city: Tanga
- Coordinates: 5°01′54″S 39°11′40″E
- Area: 552 km^{2} (213 sq mi)
- Established: 2010
- Governing body: Marine Parks & Reserves Authority (Tanzania)
- Website: Tanga Coelacanth Marine Park

The Tanga Coelacanth Marine Park (TCMP; Swahili: Hifahdi ya taifa Bahari ya Sikilikanti wa Tanga) is a marine park of Tanzania, with the IUCN category II located within Tanga Region of Tanzania. The Tanga Coelacanth Marine Park (TACMP), which covers the entirety of Tanga City and all Coastal Areas from Tanga Bay and South of the Fishing Village of Kigombe, was Gazetted in 2009 by the Government of Tanzania (GoT) in recognition of the value of the Coelacanths and for their protection (see Map 1). Coelacanths have been spotted on Tanga Island, Mwambani Bay, Yambe Island, and Karange Island, all of which are part of the Park.

== Overview ==
The park is famous for its conservation of the coelacanth. Island under the marine park include Yambe Island, Karange Island and Toten Island. Shoals in the marine park include Fungu Niule and Fungu Tongone. Offshore from Tanga Bay to Kigombe.

== Geography ==
The marine park is around 552 square kilometers, of which 85 square kilometers is terrestrial, covering small coastal parts of Pangani District, Muheza District and Tanga District. The park extends along the coast from 100 km starting from the estuary of the Pangani River to the bay of Tanga City. The Marine parks covers the Islands of Toten, Yambe and Karange Islands. The marine park is home to the famous Coelacanth. The park is also a sanctuary for the African Dugong and Green sea turtle.

== Ecology ==
Coelacanth fish are found in waters that are deeper than 150 metres. Coelacanths are among the oldest fish on earth, existing more than 300 million years before dinosaurs and listed as a "Cites I Species" that is highly endangered. They have great scientific value because we can learn a lot from them about how living things have changed over time, especially when marine organisms first began to migrate to new habitats on land. When Tanga fishermen began unintentionally catching coelacanths in Tanga while using deep-sea shark nets, the species was only found in 2003.

== Management ==
A general management plan, with specific zones for protection and multiple uses, was created for the Tanga Coelacanth Marine Park with assistance from the IUCN. The TACMP's declared goals include protecting biodiversity, managing natural resources, stopping dynamite fishing, and encouraging tourism that is friendly to marine conservation. New national regulations on user fees for marine parks and reserves were released in 2009 at the same time the Coelacanth Marine Park was gazetted. In accordance with the Marine Parks and Reserves authorities, "Marine Parks" are larger marine areas that are multipurpose and have zoning for management, while "Marine Reserves" are smaller marine regions (islands, reefs, and sandbanks) that are only for enjoyment and have no-take or extraction restrictions.
