= Mbudya Island =

Protected island of Kinondoni District in the Dar es Salaam Region of Tanzania

- IUCN category II (national park)
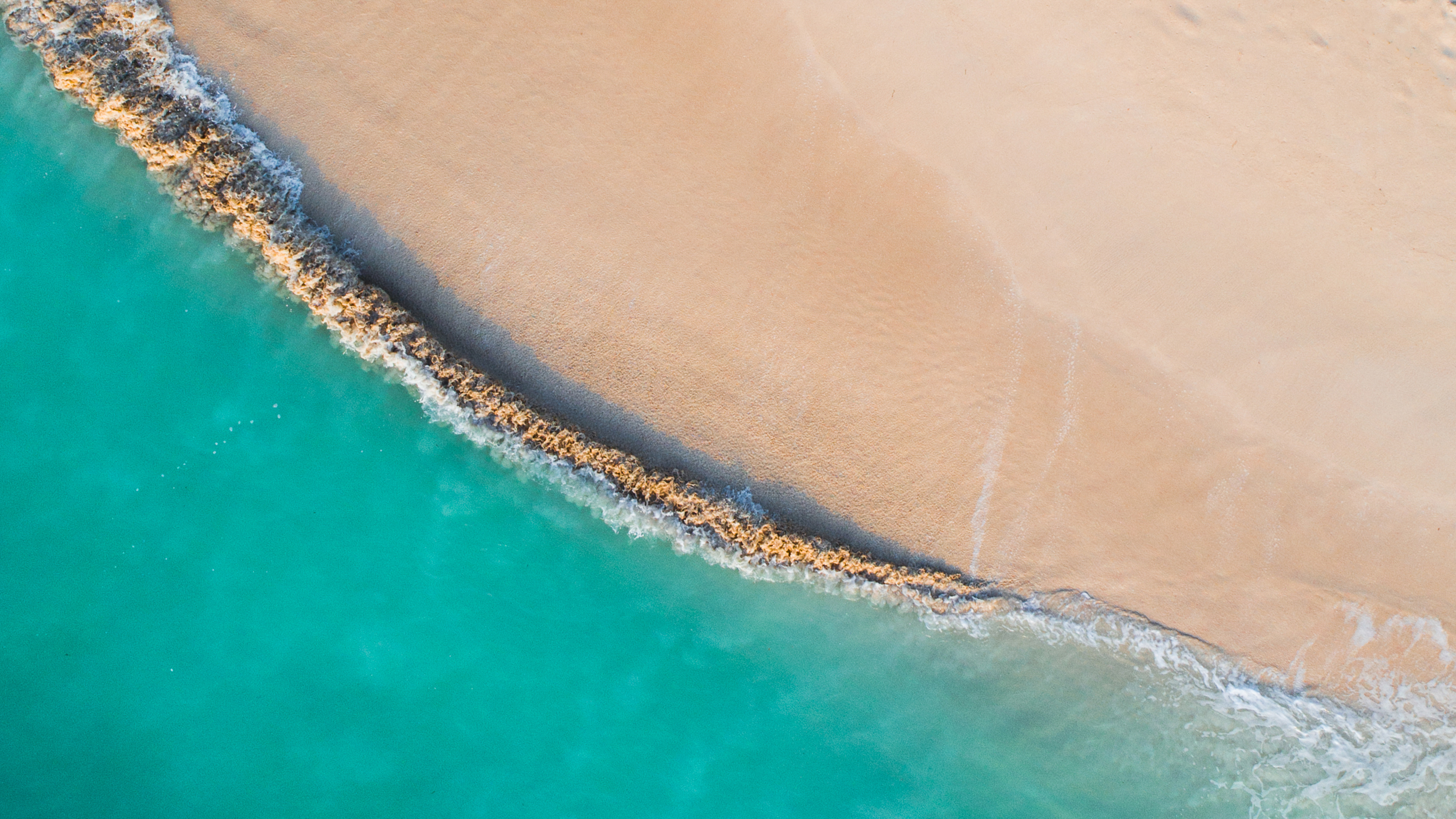
- Mbudya Island beach

- Location within Tanzania
- Location: Tanzania, Dar es Salaam Region, Kinondoni District
- Nearest city: Dar es Salaam
- Coordinates: 6°39′23″S 39°15′0″E
- Area: 14.2 km^{2} (5.5 sq mi)
- Established: 1975
- Governing body: Marine Parks & Reserves Authority (Tanzania)
- Website: DMRS

Mbudya Island (Kisiwa cha Mbudya, in Swahili) is a protected, uninhabited island under the Dar es Salaam Marine Reserve with the IUCN category II located within Kinondoni District of Dar es Salaam Region in Tanzania. The island reserve measures around 14.2 km^{2}. Fungu Yasin is to the north of the island, Bongoyo Island is to the south, and the island of Pangavini is to the west. The island is home to endangered coconut crabs.

== Endemism ==
The island is home to the Metacirolana mbudya, an endemic species of cirolanidae that has only been found to live in the waters surrounding Mbudya island. It was first discovered in 1981.

== Access and recreation ==
The island is accessible via a 20-minute speedboat journey from the mainland, which is near the beach resort and fishing village of Kunduchi. As a result, it is a notable day trip for both visitors and Tanzanian citizens, offering a variety of activities, such as snorkelling, trekking, and sunbathing.

== See also ==
- Tanzania Marine Parks and Reserves Unit
- List of protected areas of Tanzania
