= Makatumbi Islands =

Protected archipelago in the Sea of Zanj off the coast of Tanzania

- IUCN category II (national park)
- Location within Tanzania
- Location: Tanzania, Dar es Salaam Region, Kigamboni District
- Nearest city: Dar es Salaam
- Coordinates: 6°48′0″S 39°20′04″E
- Area: 7.8 km^{2} (3.0 sq mi)
- Established: March 2007
- Governing body: Marine Parks & Reserves Authority (Tanzania)
- Website: DMRS

Makatumbi Islands or Makatumbe Islands (Visiwa Vya Makatumbi in Swahili) is an archipelago of two protected, uninhabited islands in the Sea of Zanj off the coast of Tanzania. The archipelago consists of the inner and outer Makatumbi Islands and is protected by the IUCN category II designation Dar es Salaam Marine Reserve (DMRS).

The islands, located in the Kigamboni District of the Dar es Salaam Region, have a combined area of 7.8 square kilometres (3.0 sq mi). To the south is Kimbubu Island, and to the north is the mouth of Dar es Salaam harbor. The island is under threat from marine pollution; elevated cadmium readings were found east of Makatumbe Island near the entrance to the Dar es Salaam harbour.

== See also ==
- Tanzania Marine Parks and Reserves Unit
- List of protected areas of Tanzania
