= Songosongo Archipelago =

Island archipelago of Lindi Region, Tanzania

The Songosongo Islands
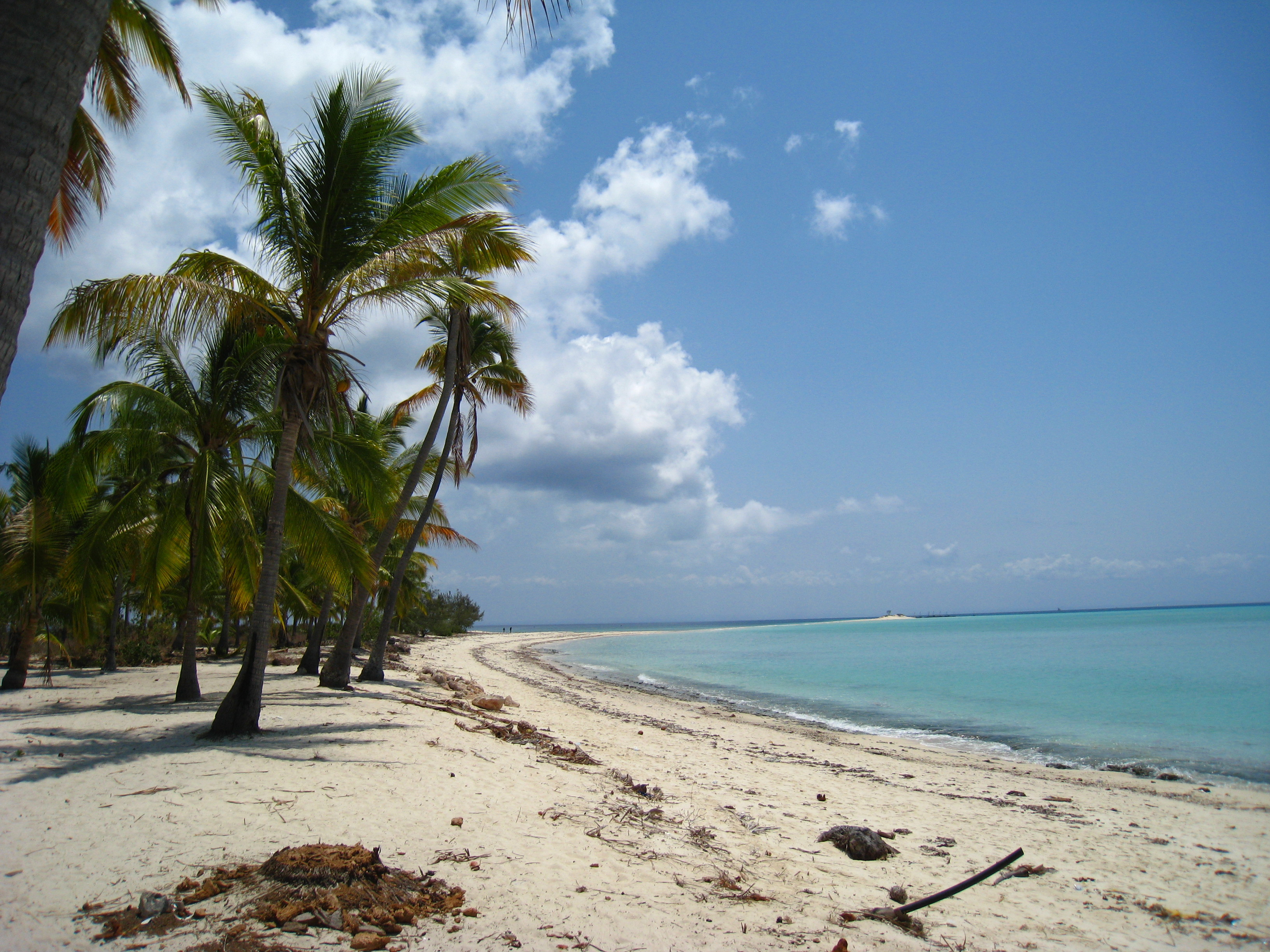
- Songo Songo Island in the Songosongo archipelago

- Location within Tanzania

Geography
- Location: Sea of Zanj in western Indian Ocean
- Coordinates: 8°31′31.8″S 39°30′16.56″E
- Total islands: 4
- Major islands: Songosongo Island
- Area: 8.5 km^{2} (3.3 sq mi)
- Highest elevation: 15 m (49 ft)

Administration
- Tanzania
- Region: Lindi Region
- District: Kilwa District
- Ward: Songosongo

Demographics
- Population: 3,056 (2012)
- Languages: Swahili
- Ethnic groups: Matumbi

The Songosongo Archipelago or The Songosongo Islands (Visiwa vya Songosongo, in Swahili) is a group of islands in Kilwa District of Lindi Region's coast on the Sea of Zanj in Tanzania's Indian Ocean coast. The archipelago is composed of 21 coral reefs including the 4 coral islands. In total, the archipelago covers a land area of 8.5 km^{2} (3.3 sq mi), and has an average elevation of 11 m (36 ft). The four Islands in the archipelago are Fanjove, Nyuni Island, Songo Songo and Okuza Island. Tanzania's geological history is very similar to that of Western Australia's northwest shelf. It has rifting from the late Jurassic, then sags in the Cretaceous and Tertiary continental shelves. The largest natural gas deposits in Tanzania are located in the Songosongo archipelago. The Islands have been found to contain 20 million tonnes worth of natural gas within the archipelago.
