= Pangavini Island =

Protected island of Kinondoni District in the Dar es Salaam Region of Tanzania

- IUCN category II (national park)
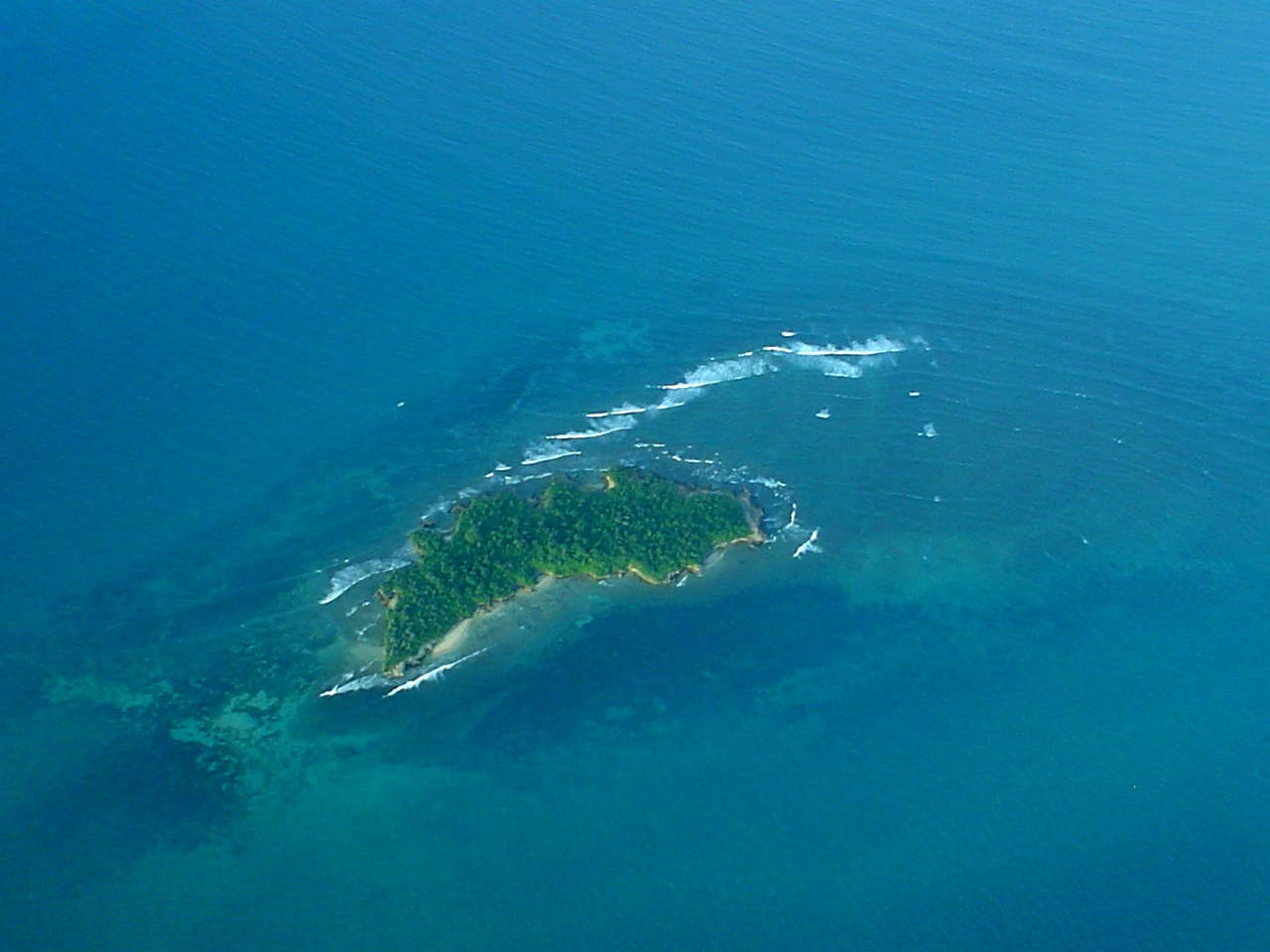
- Pangavini Island

- Location within Tanzania
- Location: Tanzania, Dar es Salaam Region, Kinondoni District
- Nearest city: Dar es Salaam
- Coordinates: 6.6747°S 39.239°E
- Area: 2.13 km^{2} (0.82 sq mi)
- Established: 1975
- Governing body: Marine Parks & Reserves Authority (Tanzania)
- Website: DMRS

Pangavini Island (Kisiwa cha Pangavini, in Swahili) is a protected, uninhabited island under the Dar es Salaam Marine Reserve with the IUCN category II located within Kinondoni District of Dar es Salaam Region in Tanzania. The island reserve measures around 2.13 km^{2}. Pangavini is the smallest island in the group, only about 250 m long; it has a rocky coastline without beaches. To the west of the island is Kunduchi ward and to the north is Mbudya Island. To the south of the island is Bongoyo Island.

== Overview ==
The island protects a variety of vital tropical habitats and biological diversity, including seagrass beds, coral reefs, and several fish species. The beauty of Pangavini Island is that it is both the nightly and nesting habitat for the majority of the birds that huddle above Dar es Salaam metropolis during the day. Additionally, migratory birds can use the reserve as a rest stop on their way south during the winter. A variety of rats, birds, and reptiles use Pangavini Island as a breeding, resting, and feeding ground. Due to the excellent diving and snorkelling conditions and the abundance of sea grass beds within the reserve area, the region is special. The island is home to endangered coconut crabs.

== See also ==
- Tanzania Marine Parks and Reserves Unit
- List of protected areas of Tanzania
