= Bongoyo Island =

Protected island of Kinondoni District in the Dar es Salaam Region of Tanzania

- IUCN category II (national park)
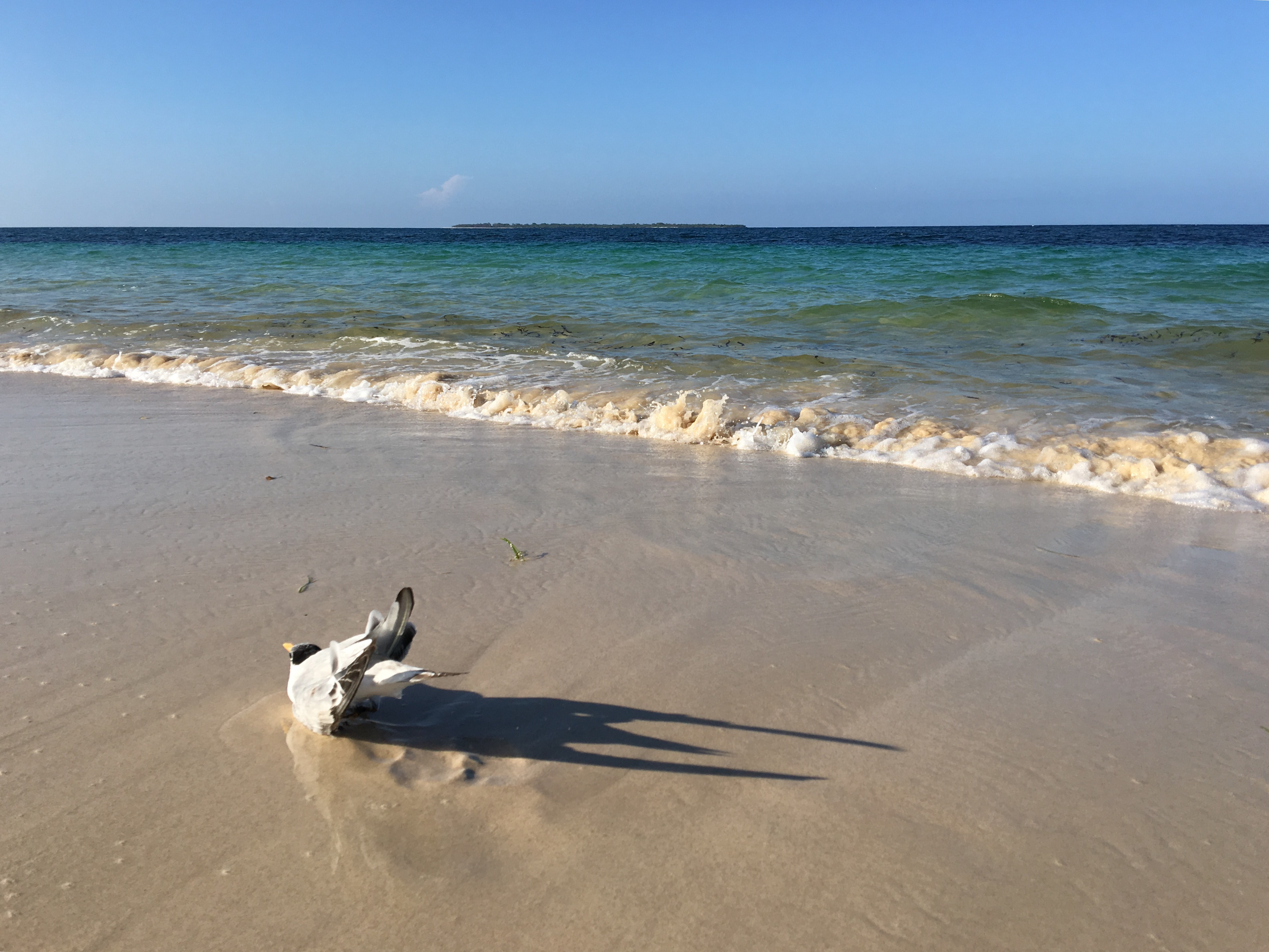
- Bongoyo Island beach

- Location within Tanzania
- Location: Tanzania, Dar es Salaam Region, Kinondoni District
- Nearest city: Dar es Salaam
- Coordinates: 6.69°S 39.26°E
- Area: 19.1 km^{2} (7.4 sq mi)
- Established: 1975
- Governing body: Marine Parks & Reserves Authority (Tanzania)
- Website: DMRS

Bongoyo Island (Kisiwa cha Bongoyo, in Swahili) is a protected, uninhabited island under the Dar es Salaam Marine Reserve with the IUCN category II located within Kinondoni District of Dar es Salaam Region in Tanzania. The island situated 2.5 km north of the country's largest city, Dar es Salaam in the indian Ocean. It is the most frequently visited of the four islands of the Dar es Salaam Marine Reserve System (DMRS) and a popular daytrip for both tourists and Tanzanian residents alike for snorkelling and sunbathing. North of the island is Mbudya Island and to the west is Pangavini Island. The island is home to some of Tanzania's largest specimens of endangered coconut crabs.

== Geography ==
The island has a very rocky shore and only two beaches. All visitors visit the beach at the northwestern tip of the island, where the boats moor and where there are some huts, drinks and food. The much longer but narrower beach along the northeastern side has no facilities and is mostly deserted. The entire island (apart from the beaches) is covered in dense forest and has a few walking trails, so only a few people venture there. The terrain is somewhat treacherous with sharp rocks. In the middle of the island one finds the remains of a German colonial building at 6°42′8.48″S 39°16′11.49″E, clearly visible on Google Maps. The Indian Ocean has penetrated the northern shore of the island, creating a tidal lagoon along whose shores there are some mangroves.

== Access ==
The island lies close to the Msasani Peninsula (in the Kinondoni district of the city) and is reachable by means of a 30-minute boat ride from the mainland. The point of departure for most visitors to the island is 'The Slipways' hotel complex on the western side of the Msasani Peninsula.

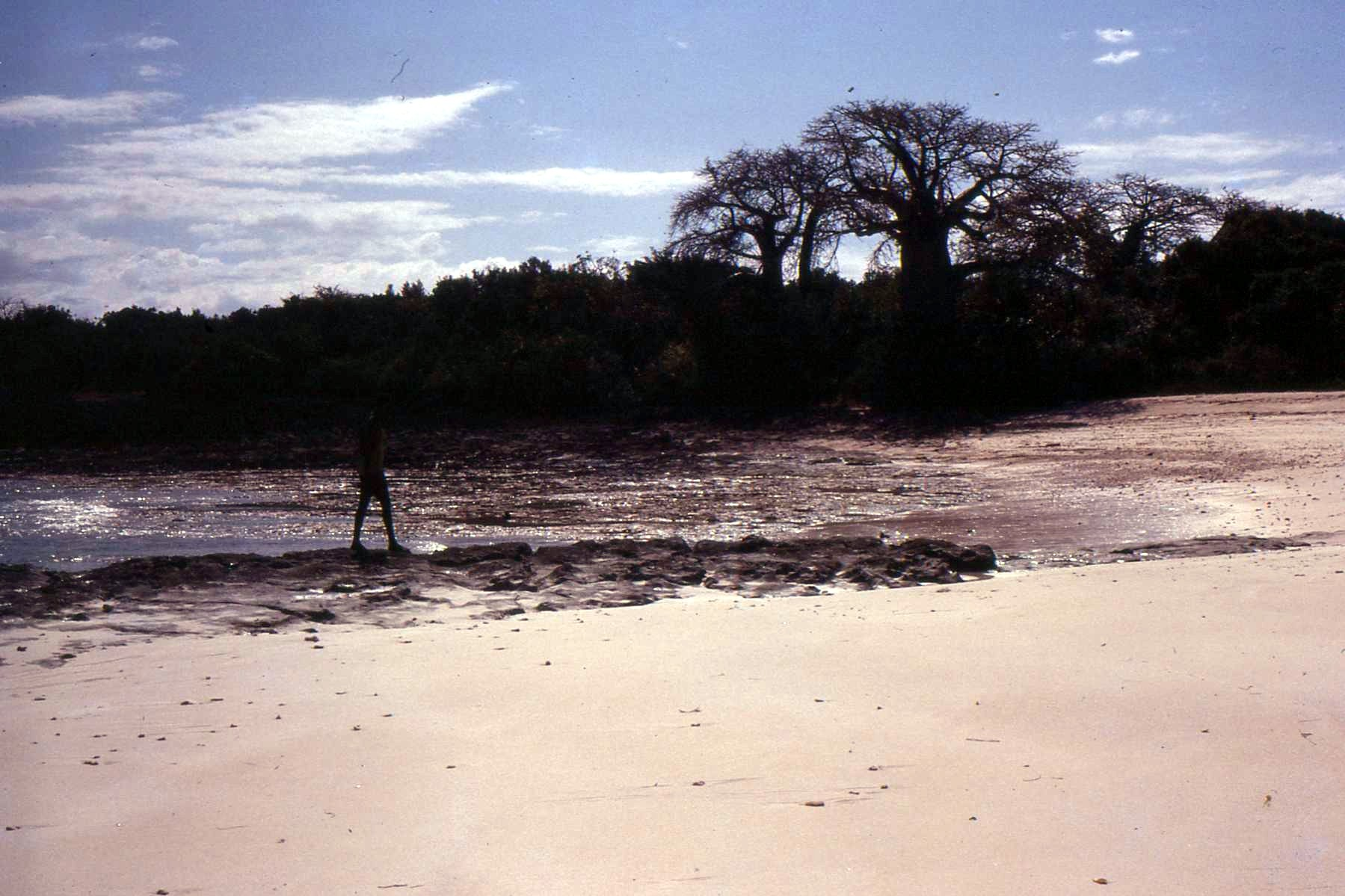
Bongoyo Island, 1979

== See also ==
- Tanzania Marine Parks and Reserves Unit
- List of protected areas of Tanzania
