= Sinda Island =

Protected island of Kigamboni District in the Dar es Salaam Region of Tanzania

- IUCN category II (national park)
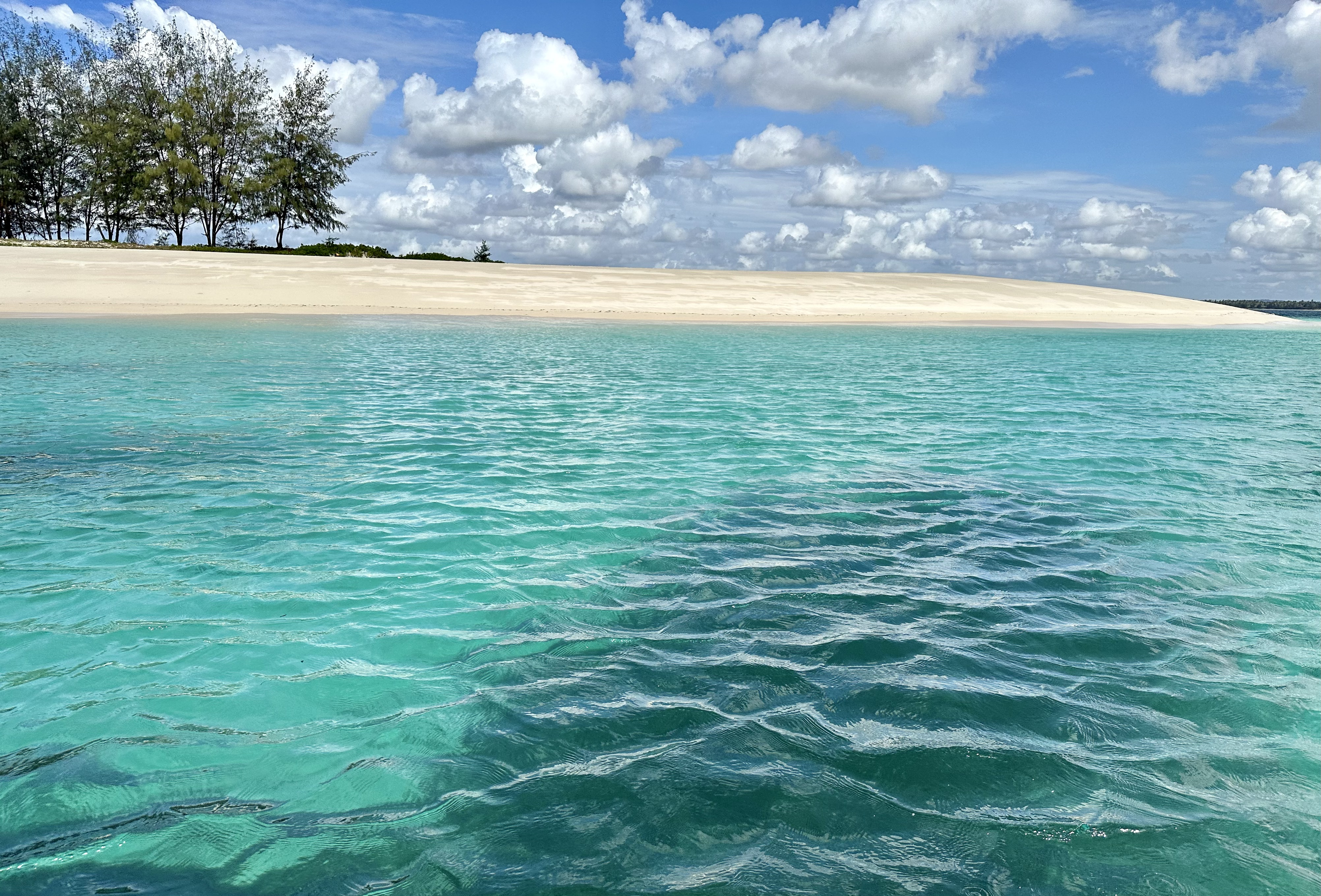
- Shore of Sinda Island

- Location within Tanzania
- Location: Tanzania, Dar es Salaam Region, Kigamboni District
- Nearest city: Dar es Salaam
- Coordinates: 6°49′13″S 39°23′52″E
- Area: 4.6 km^{2} (1.8 sq mi)
- Established: March 2007
- Governing body: Marine Parks & Reserves Authority (Tanzania)
- Website: DMRS

Sinda Island (Kisiwa cha Sinda, in Swahili) is a protected, uninhabited island in the indian Ocean under the Dar es Salaam Marine Reserve (DMRS) with the IUCN category II located within Kigamboni District of Dar es Salaam Region in Tanzania. The islands reserve measures around 4.6 km^{2} consisting of inner and outer Sinder Island. South of the island is Kikwero reef and west is the Somangila ward of Kigamboni. The island is home to endangered coconunt crabs. The Islands are home to ruins that date back to the 19th century, but Arab sailor Ibn Majid first noted the islands in 1470.

Sinda Island Gallery
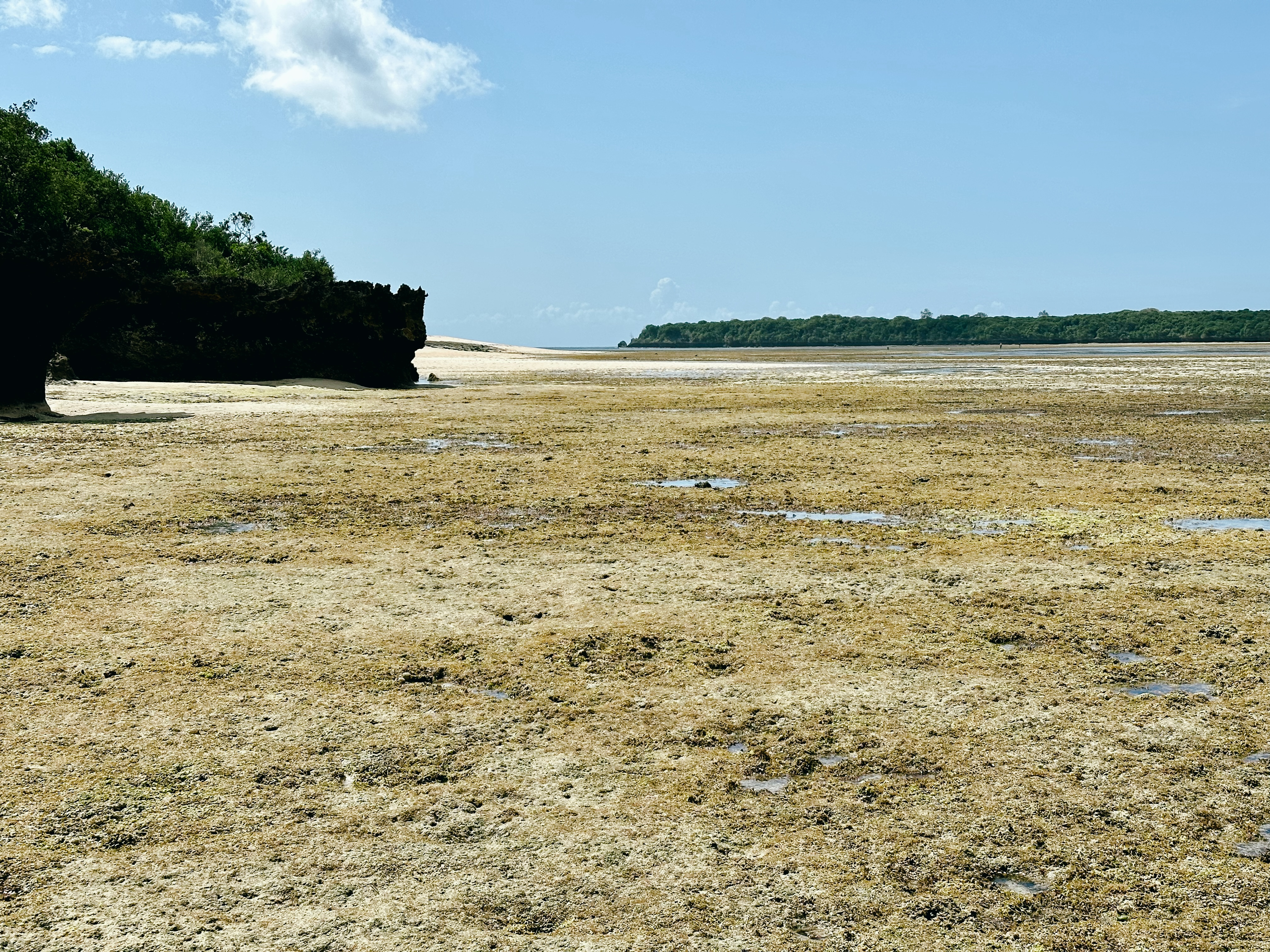
Outer Sinda Island during low tide.

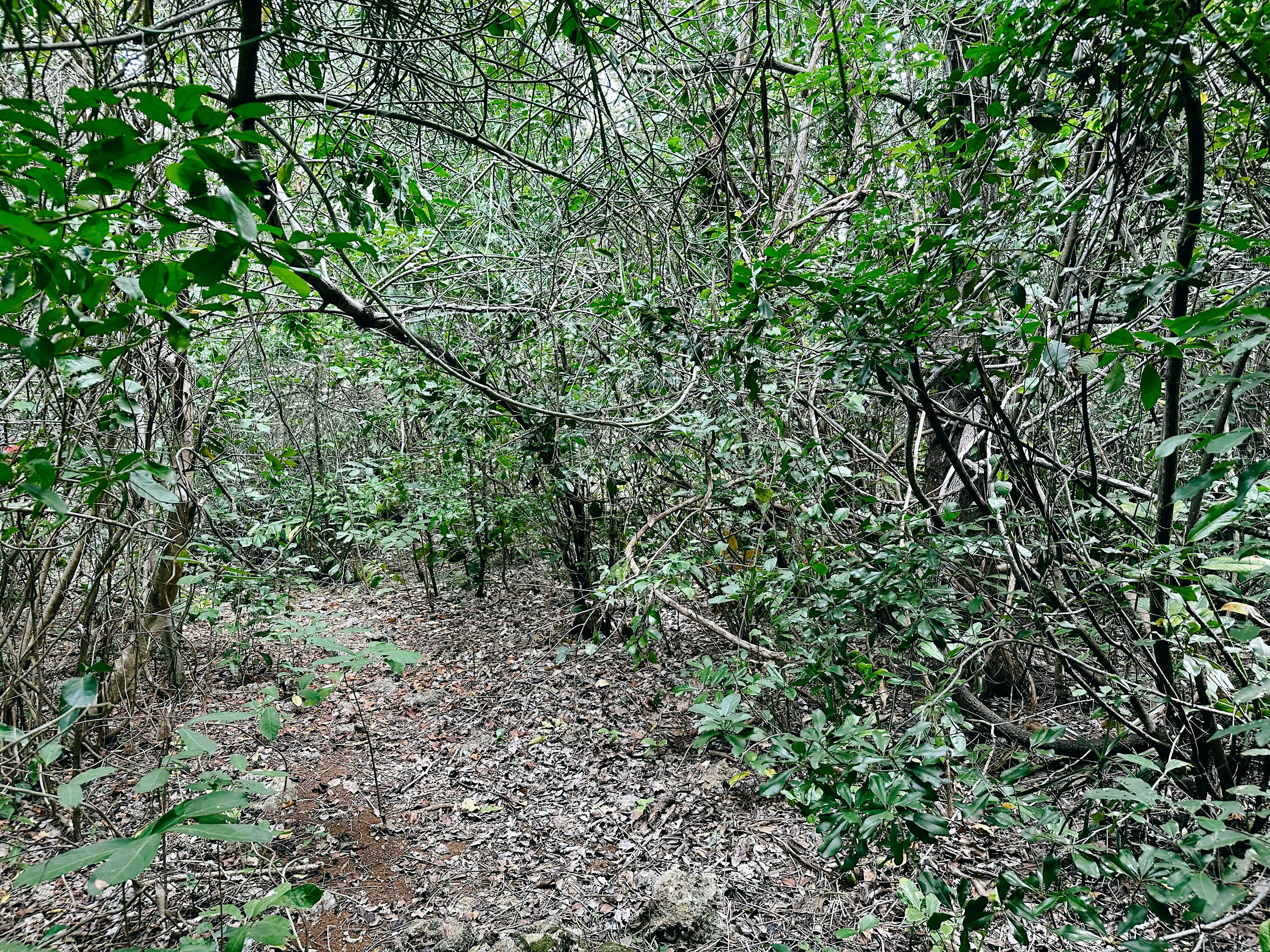
Virgin coastal Forest of Sinda Island.

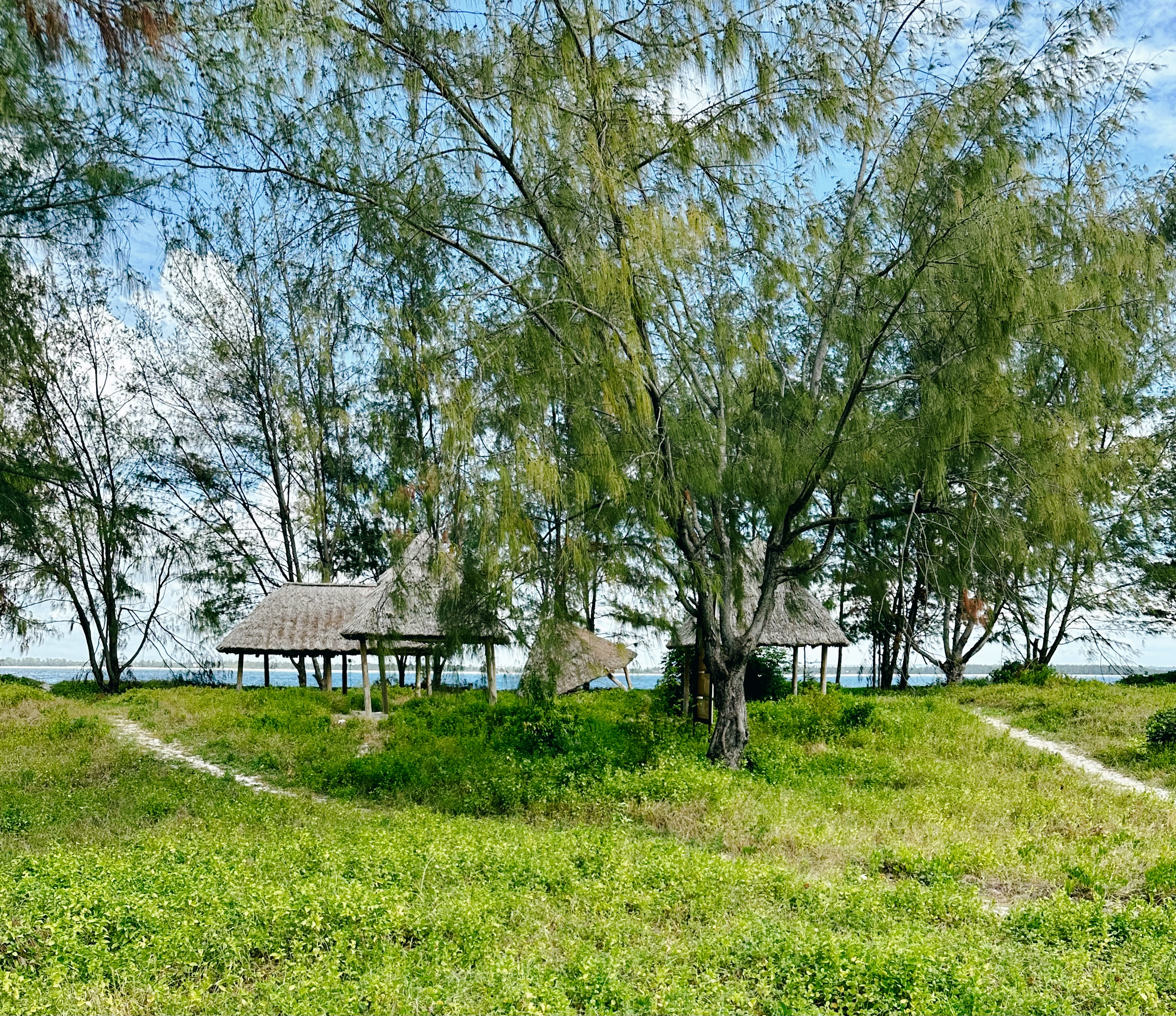
Neglected recreation area on Sinda Iasland.

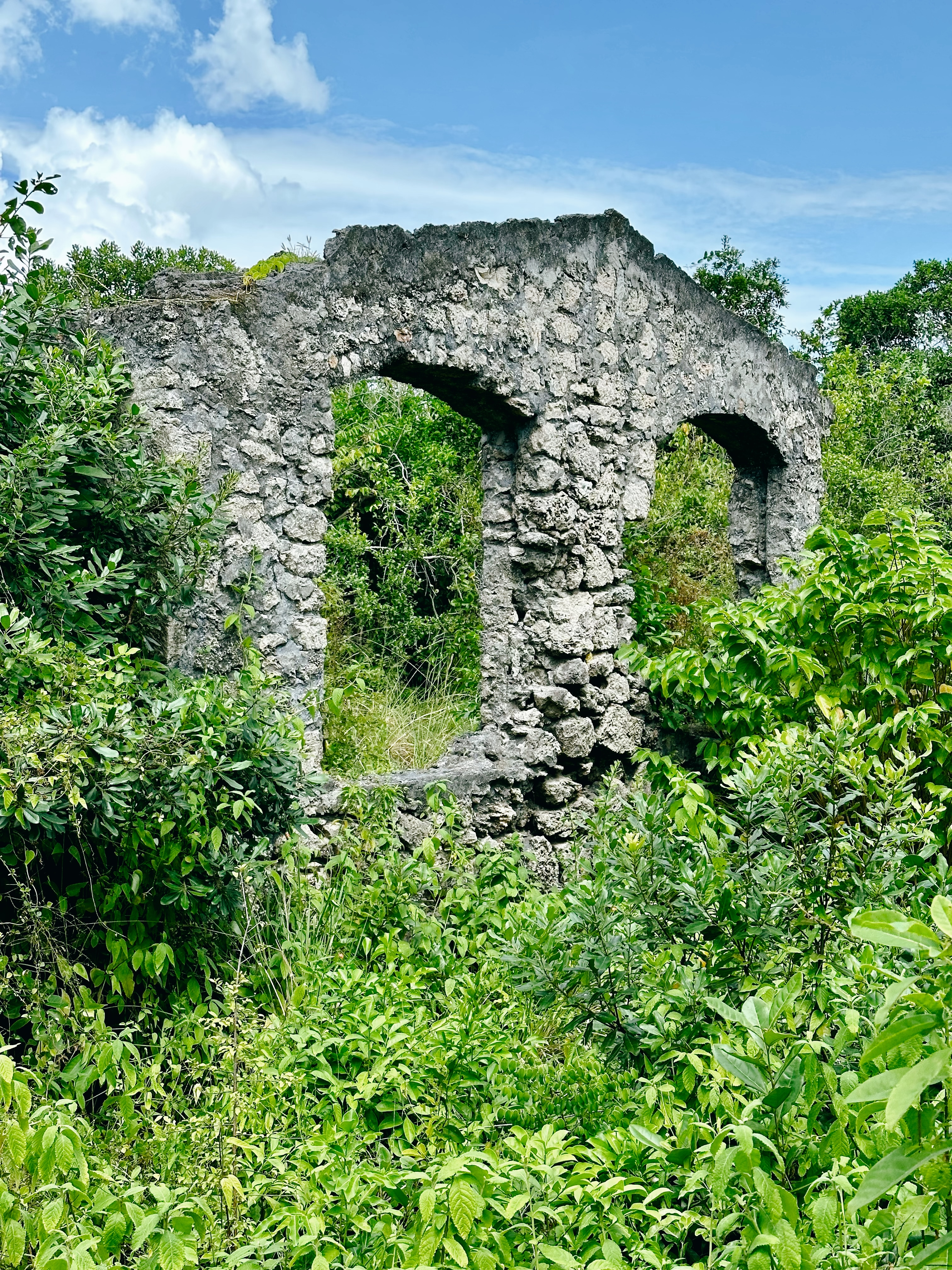
19-20th Century ruins on the island.

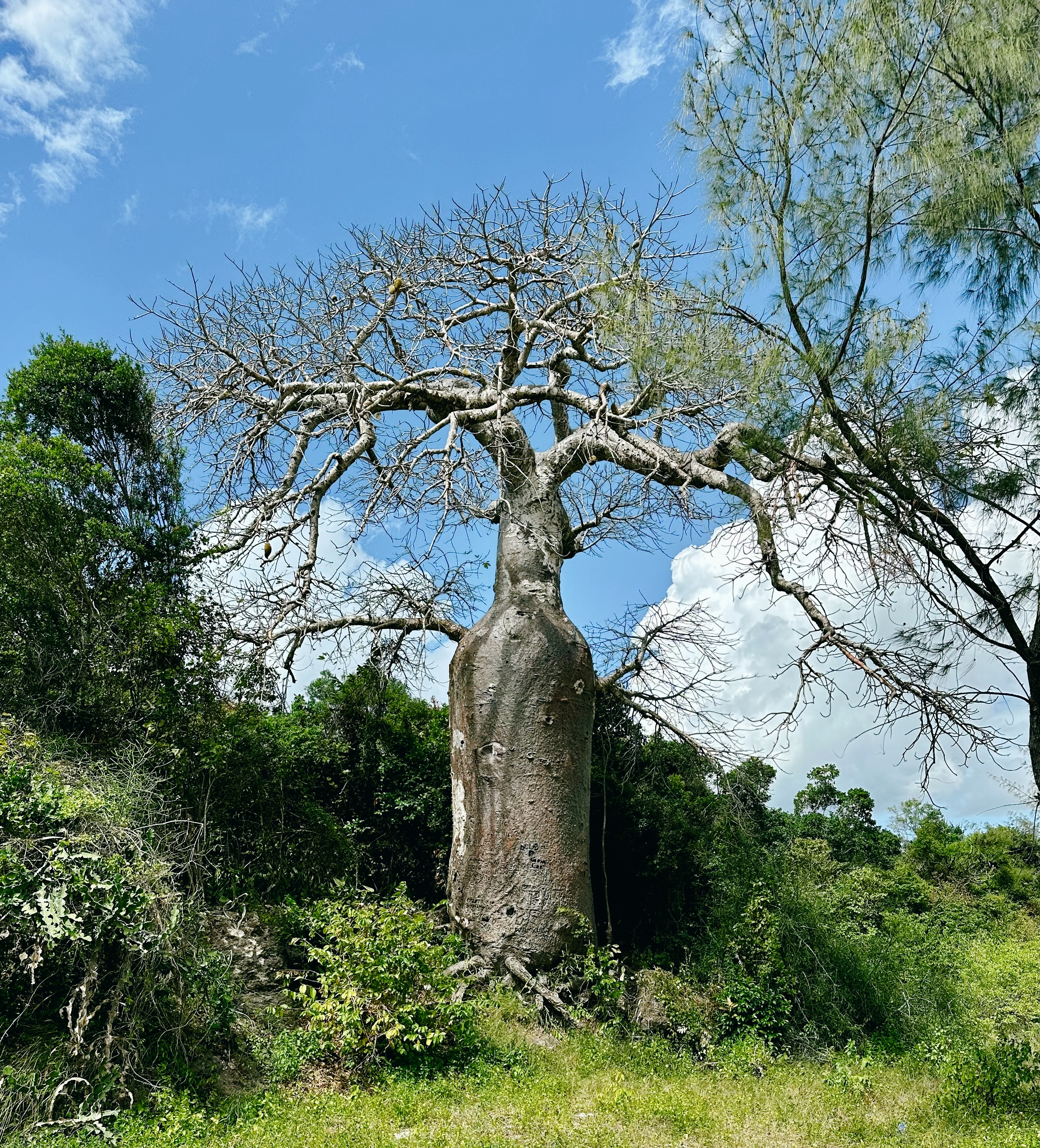
The great bottle Baobab of Sinda.

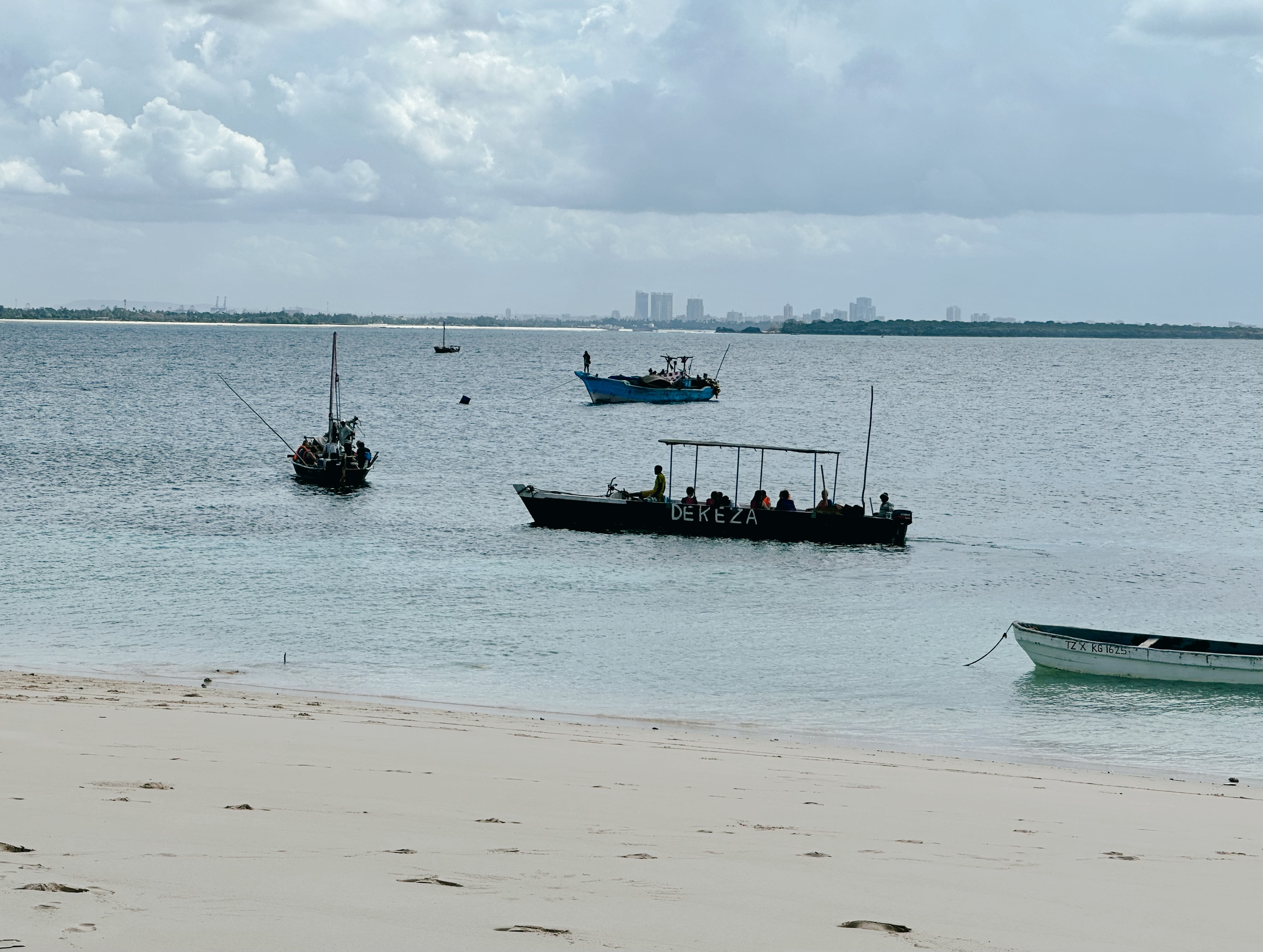
View of Ilala MC from Sinda Island

== See also ==
- Tanzania Marine Parks and Reserves Unit
- List of protected areas of Tanzania
