= Tanzania Marine Parks and Reserves Unit =

Conservation organization based in Tanzania

Marine Parks and Reserves Unit

Government agency overview
- Formed: 1994
- Jurisdiction: Mainland Tanzania
- Headquarters: Upanga West, Ilala District, Dar es Salaam Region
- Motto: Let us share the gift of nature together
- Minister responsible: Mwigulu Nchemba, Minister of Agriculture, Livestock and Fisheries
- Government agency executive: Dr. Milali Machumu, CEO
- Key document: Marine Parks and Reserve Act No 29, of 1994
- Website: www.marineparks.go.tz

The Marine Park and Reserves Unit (Hifahi akiba za Bahari ya Tanzania, in Swahili) of Tanzania was formed in 1994 under the Marine Parks and Reserve Act No 29, of 1994. The headquarters are located in Upanga West ward of Ilala District in Dar es Salaam Region. Previously all marine life and biodiversity was under the Ministry of Livestock and Fisheries. The population along the 1400 km Tanzanian coastline has reached to over 10 million and the increase in number of people whose livelihood depends on the marine resource has also increased. The increase in population has caused various threats to the marine life due to over fishing, coral mining and unplanned increase in settlements. To protect the marine biodiversity the Government of Tanzania established the Marine Park and Reserves unit in 1994 with Mafia Island Marine Park as the first marine park.

== History ==
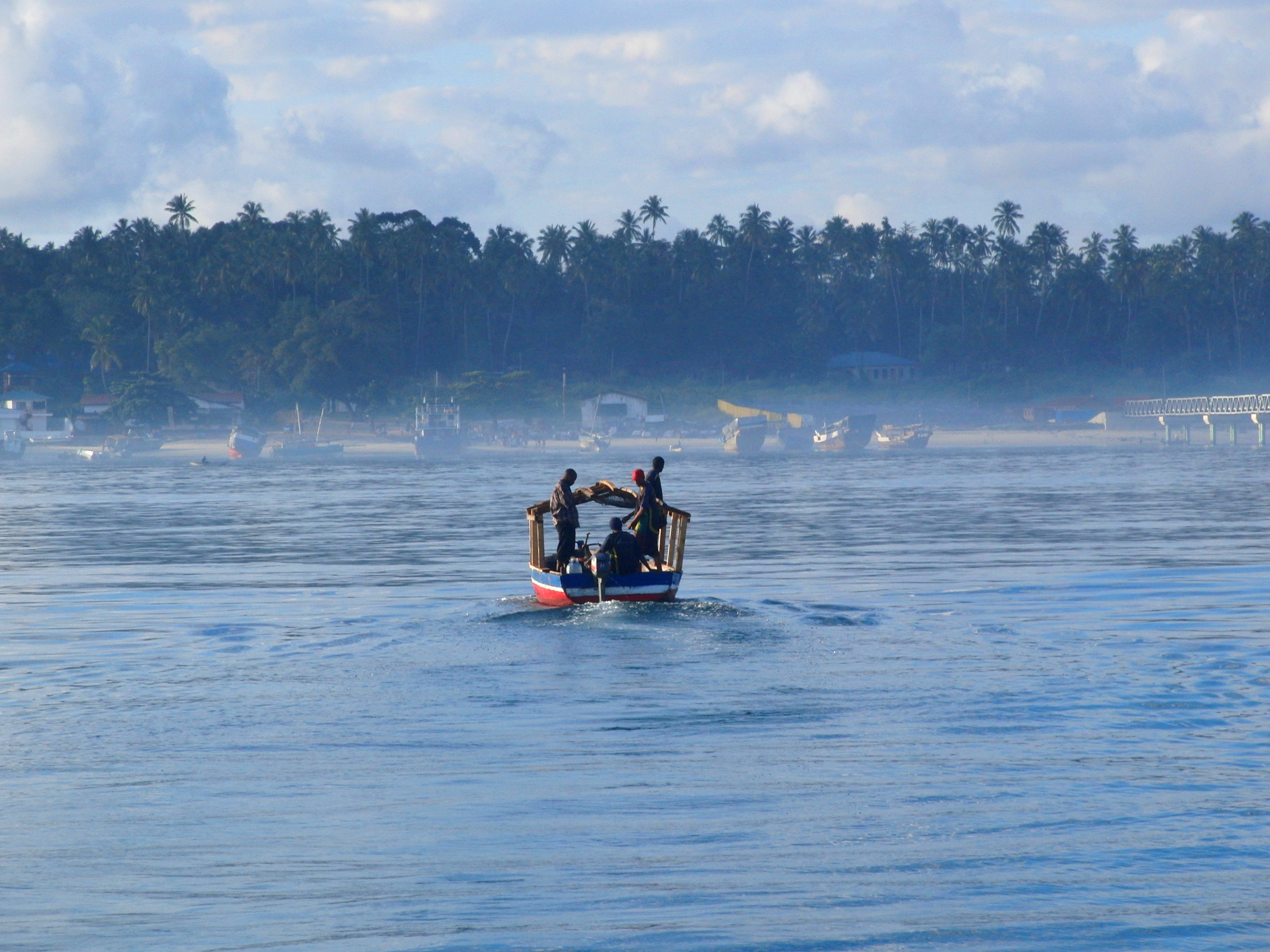
Harbour at Mafia Island

Marine Reserves had been first surveyed and have existed in Tanzania since the 1960s. However, the reserves and its biodiversity was not under any specific management or institution, but rather under the jurisdiction of the Department of Fisheries. There was no real interest or debate regarding the marine reserves until 1980. In 1980 the villagers of the Mafia district desired to establish a protected area around their island and this rejuvenated talks and national interest to establish Marine protected areas in the country. In the late 1980s and the beginning of 1990 the government began to draft legislature for the establishment of the Marine Parks and Reserves Unit. In 1994 the parliament passed the Marine Parks and Reserves Act which established the organization. The organization falls under the Ministry of livestock and fisheries and is responsible for electing a board. The Act for the first time in Tanzania, provided legal framework for the conservation and management for marine environments. The organization is responsible for regulating local fishing in the reserves and supervise commercial and tourist operations. With this framework Mafia Island Marine Park was declared the first Marine park in Mainland Tanzania in 1995.

== Marine Parks and Reserves ==
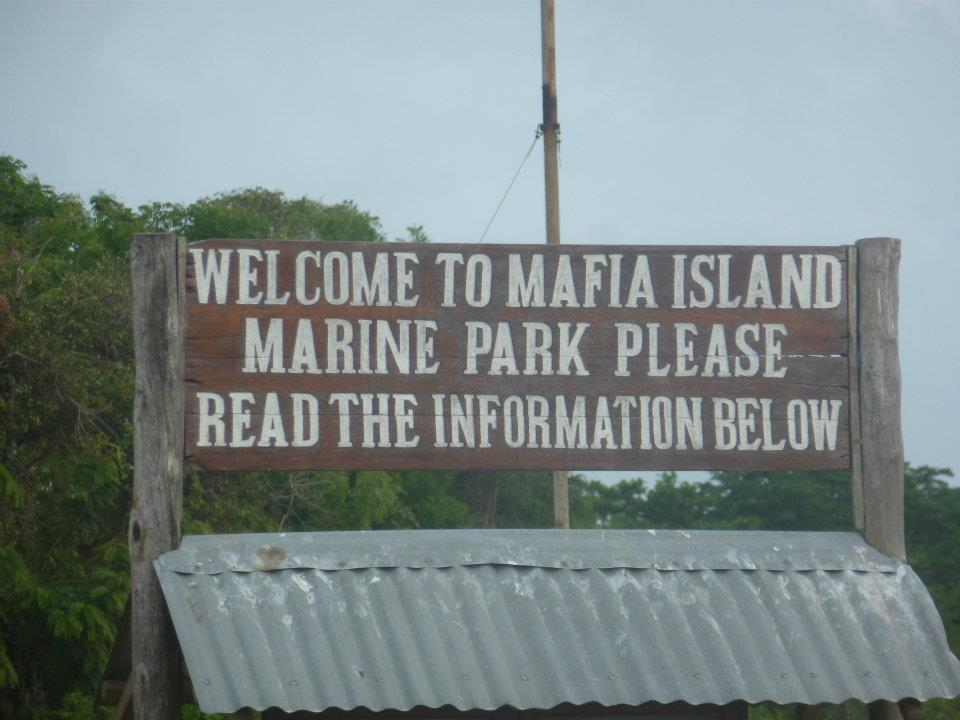
Sign at entrance of Mafia Island Marine park

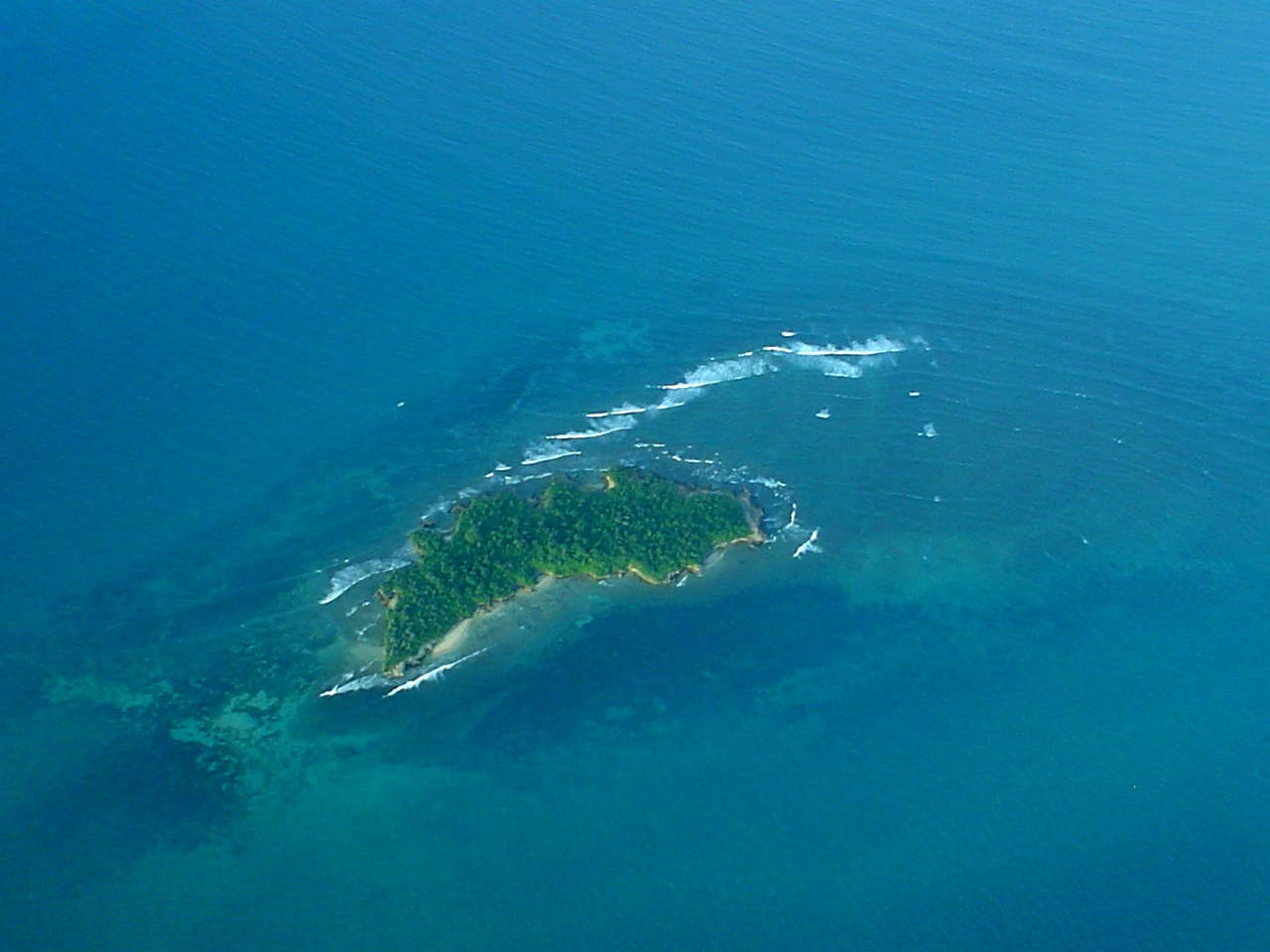
Aerial view of Pangavini Island

As of December 2015 the Marine Parks and Reserves Unit has a mandate of 3 Marine parks and 15 Marine reserves on the mainland. A marine reserve is an area allocated to help towards the preservation of the coastal and marine biodiversity. Fishing and in habitation in a marine reserve is prohibited and only limited entry such as for tourism and research is permitted. While a marine park is a special version of the reserve where various community users and habitation is encouraged. However, it is highly regulated and continuous education of the community is provided to ensure longevity of the fauna.

Marine Reserves

- Dar es Salaam Marine Reserves System
  - Bongoyo Marine Reserve
  - Mbudya Island Marine Reserve
  - Pangavini Island Marine Reserve
  - Fungu Yasini Island Marine Reserve
  - Latham Island Marine Reserve
  - Kimbubu Island Marine Reserve
  - Kendwa Island Marine Reserve
  - Makatumbi Islands Marine Reserve
  - Sinda Island Marine Reserve
- Tanga Marine Reserves
  - Maziwe Island Marine Reserve
  - Kwale Island Marine Reserve
  - Kirui Island Marine Reserve
  - Ulenge Island Marine Reserve
  - Mwewe Island Marine Reserve
- Mafia Islands Marine Reserves
  - Mbarakuni Island Marine Reserve
  - Nyororo Island Marine Reserve
  - Shungi Mbili Island Marine Reserve

Marine Parks

- Mafia Island Marine Park
- Mnazi Bay-Ruvuma Estuary Marine Park
- Tanga Coelacanth Marine Park

== Tariffs ==
The Marine Parks and Reserve Unit makes most of its revenue from licensing and park fees charged to tourists. 70% of this revenue gets put back into the authority and the remaining 20% goes towards the local communities and 10% goes towards the District authorities. Below as of December 2015 are the park fees charged per person, per day to remain in the park:

		Tanzanian	Non-Tanzanian
1	For each person above the age of 15 years	TSh 2,000/=	US$20
2	Between the age of 5 years and 15 years	TSh 1,000/=	US$10
3	Children below the age of 5 years	Free	Free

for more tariffs such as licensing: marineparks.go.tz/tariffs

== See also ==
- List of protected areas in Tanzania
- Tanzania National Parks Authority
