= Songo Songo Island =

Island in the Songosongo Archipelago, Tanzania

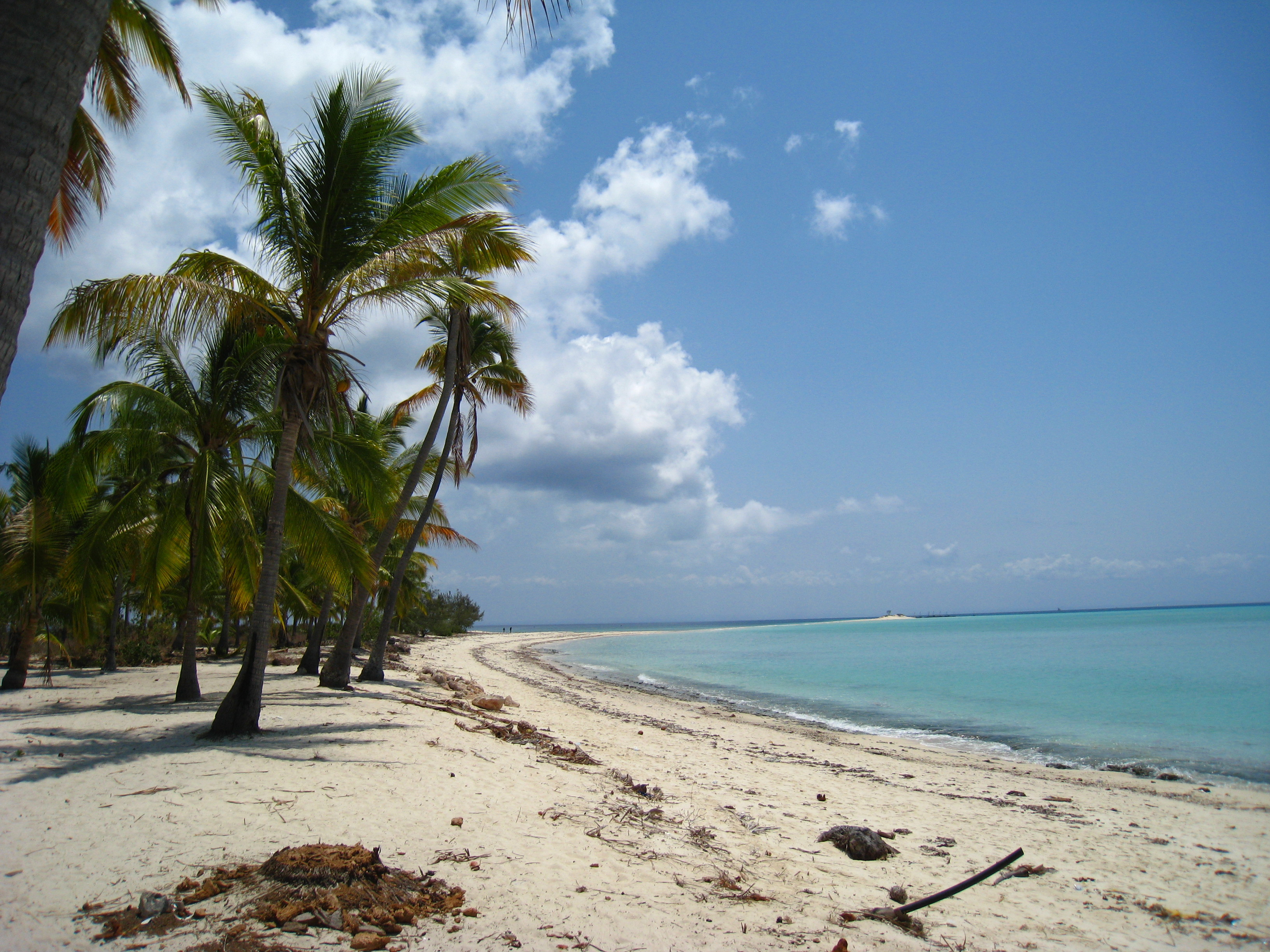
- Beach on Songo songo Island

- Location on the Songosongo Archipelago

Geography
- Location: Sea of Zanj
- Coordinates: 8°31′22.7″S 39°30′04.1″E
- Archipelago: The Songosongo Archipelago
- Length: 4.7 km (2.92 mi)
- Width: 1.7 km (1.06 mi)

Administration
- Tanzania
- Region: Lindi Region
- District: Kilwa District
- Ward: Songosongo

Demographics
- Languages: Swahili
- Ethnic groups: Matumbi

Songo Songo Island, or sometimes spelled Songosongo Island (Swahili: Kisiwa cha Songosongo), is a coral island in the Songosongo Archipelago. The island is governed by the Songosongo ward in Kilwa District of Lindi Region in Tanzania's Indian ocean coast. It is served by the Songo Songo Airstrip. The island's native inhabitants are the Matumbi people.

== Gas exploration and extraction ==
There is a long and complicated history of the Songo Songo integrated gas-to-electricity project that began in 1974 with the discovery of an offshore natural gas deposit by the Italian oil company AGIP, not far from Songo Songo island.Despite the present challenges, Songas has been highly helpful to Tanzania, not only because of the increased capacity for electricity production but also because it has reduced Tanzania's reliance on imported fuel oil for power generation. According to TPDC, the project prevented the import of $5 billion worth of oil in 2015.

== Climate change impacts ==
Similar to many other nations where eucheumatoid seaweeds are cultivated, Kappaphycus alvarezii is dying off in Tanzania. Many cultivation locations in shallow intertidal environments, where it used to grow successfully, are experiencing farming failure. Seaweed is now rarely produced in some regions due to the sharp decline in production.

Between February and May 2009, a study was conducted on Songo Songo Island in southern Tanzania, one of the worst-affected regions. The water's average temperature was 35.7 2.4 °C, which was higher than what was seen in seaweed farms in other parts of Tanzania. The salinity was 34.7 ppt, which is typical for seawater. Ice-ice, epiphytic Neosiphonia, and "dark spots" on the seaweed were detected in the abandoned farming sites. Additionally, fouling was seen. Production of seaweed dropped from 423.9 t in 2003, valued at $82,000, to 26 t in 2008, only about $4,500, and 28 t in 2012, valued at $4,300. When production peaked in 2003, there were the most farmers (809), which fell to 320 by 2008.

When there were more farmers and more seaweed produced, the number of fishing vessels decreased, and it rose when there were less farmers and more seaweed produced. Thus, the production of seaweed in Songo Songo has dramatically decreased as a result of high surface water temperatures combined with fouling, epiphytism, and ice-ice illness symptoms. The formerly profitable seaweed farming industry in Songo Songo Island, has almost completely ceased.

== Airstrip ==
Songo Songo Airstrip is a private aerodrome on the island. As of November 2020, it was served, along with nearby Mafia Island, by Coastal Aviation. The airstrip has a single paved runway measuring about 1,050 metres (3,440 ft), and it is managed by the Tanzania Petroleum Development Corporation (TPDC).

== Gallery ==
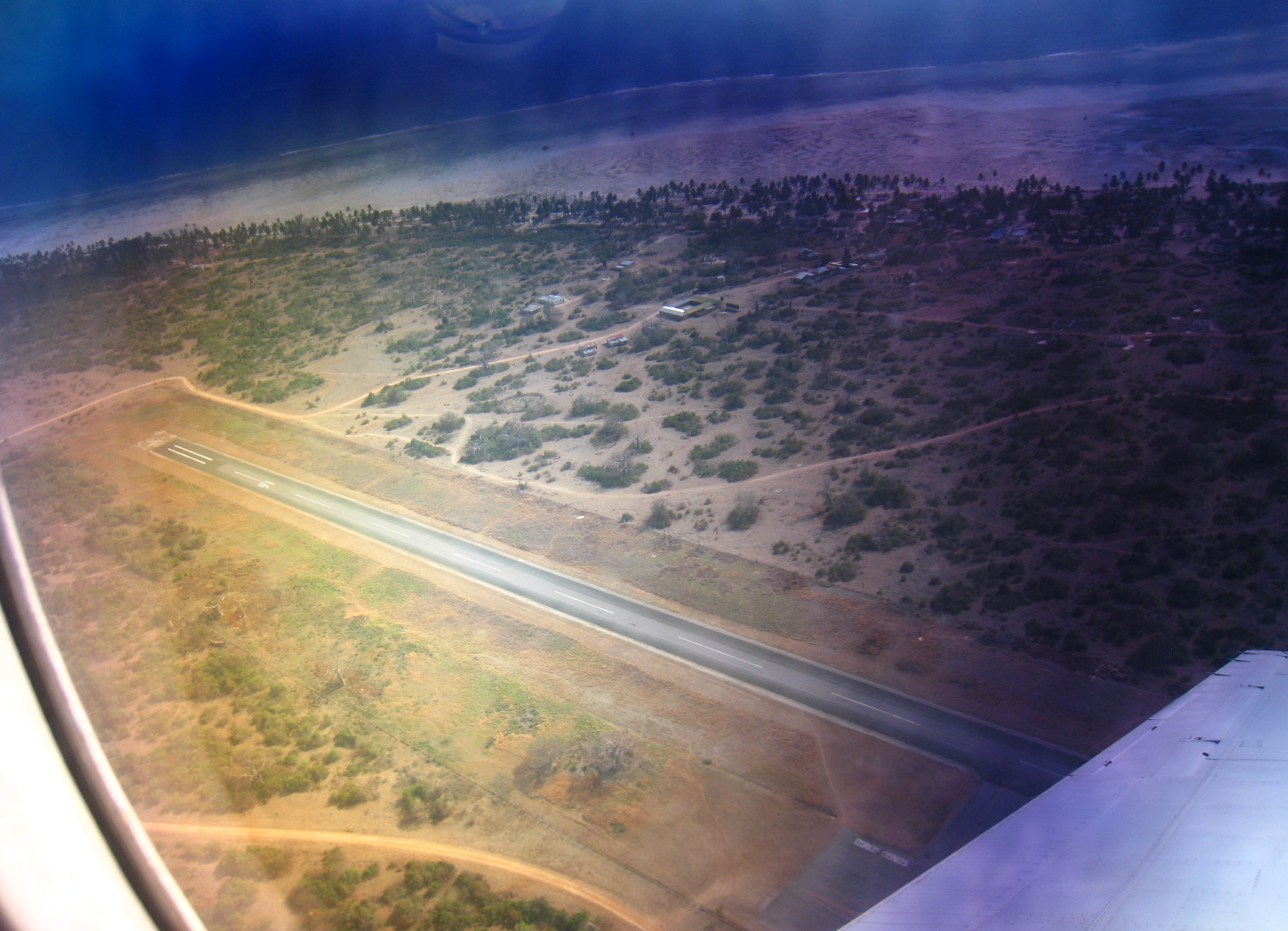
Airstrip

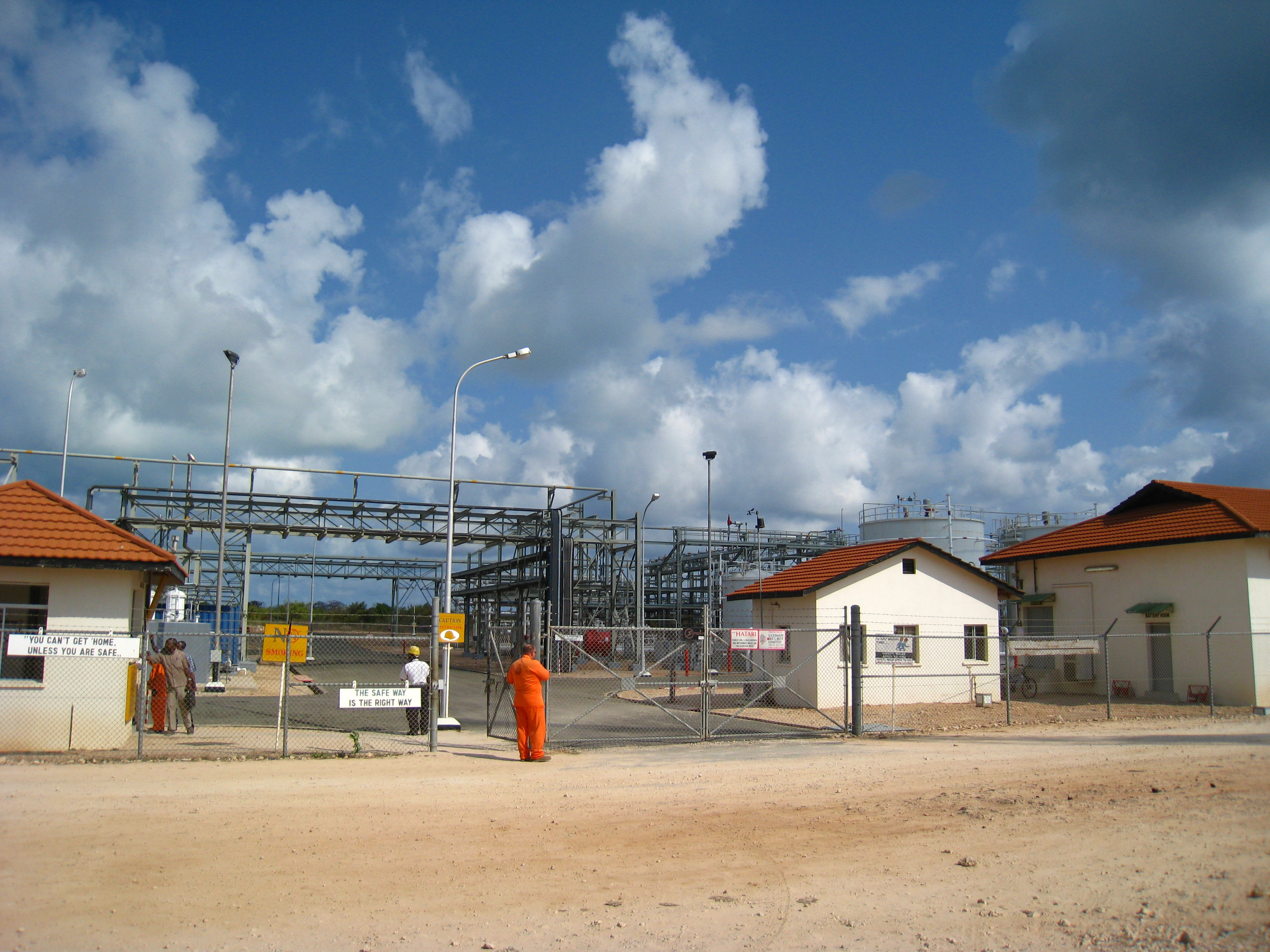
Gas Plant

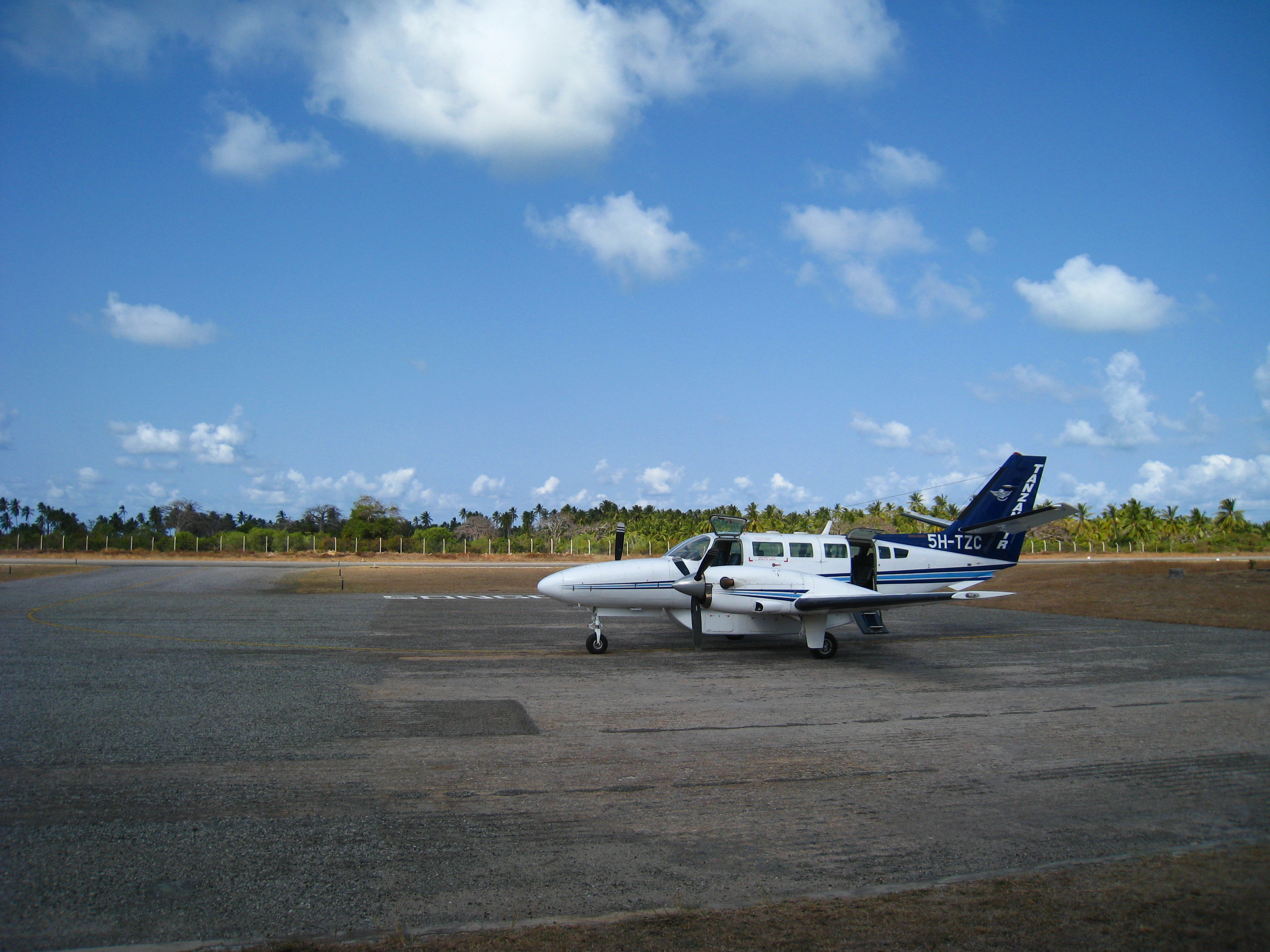
Tanzanair flight at Songo Songo Airstrip
