= Msambweni, Tanga City Council =

Ward in Tanga City Council, Tanga Region

Msambweni Kata ya Msambweni (Swahili)
- Ward of Tanga City Council
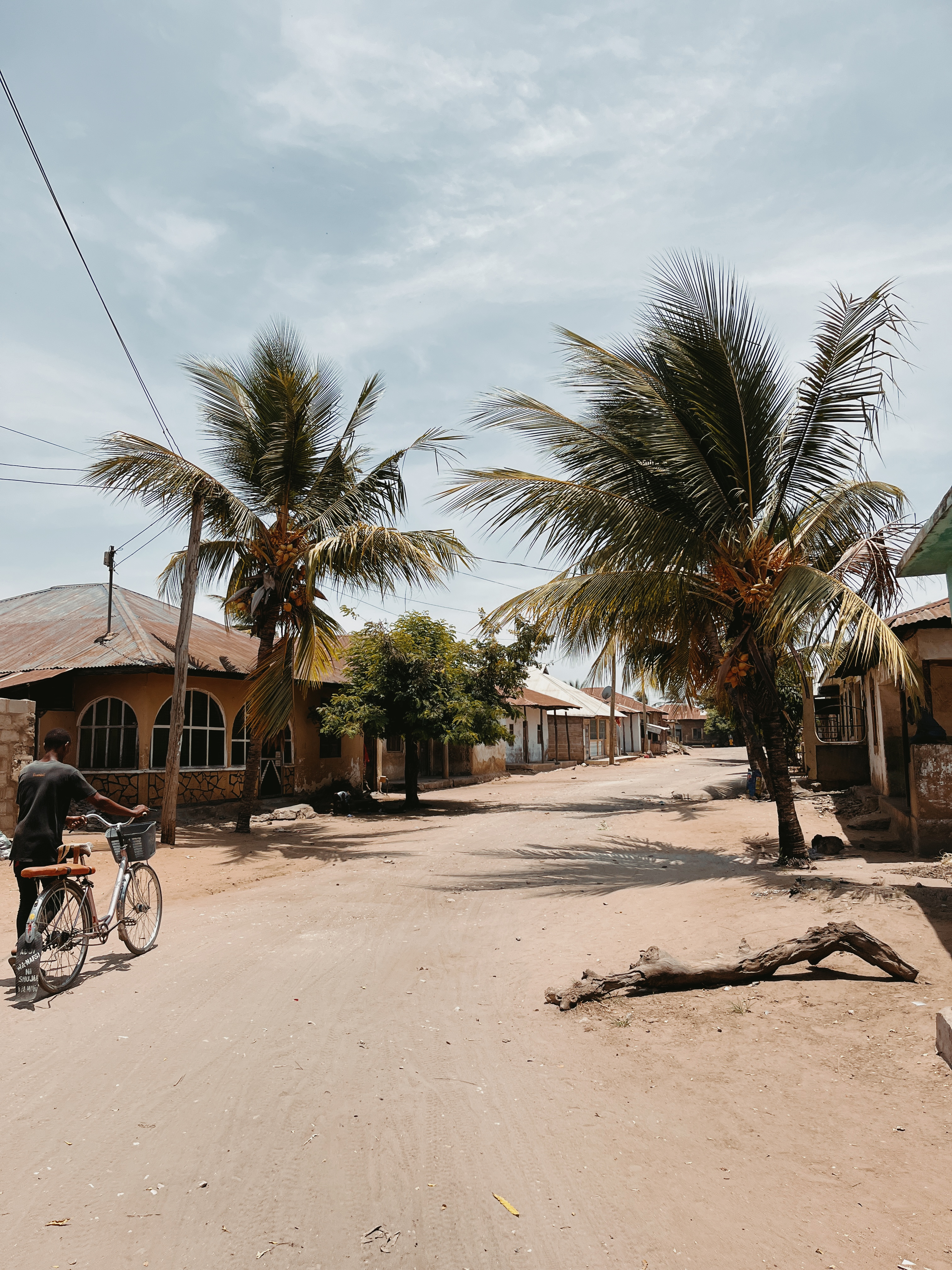
- From top to bottom: Street scene in Msambweni
- Interactive map of Msambweni
- Coordinates: 5°5′23.28″S 39°6′5.4″E
- Country: Tanzania
- Region: Tanga Region
- District: Tanga City Council

Area
  - Total: 0.9 km^{2} (0.35 sq mi)

Population (2012)
  - Total: 9,610

Ethnic groups
  - Settler: Swahili
  - Ancestral: Digo & Segeju
- Tanzanian Postal Code: 21111

Msambweni (Kata ya Msambweni , in Swahili) is an administrative ward in Tanga City Council of Tanga Region in Tanzania. Ngamiani Kusini forms the northern boundary of the ward. Makorora is the ward that is bordered to the east. The Mabawa and Duga ward is to the south. The Mwanzange is to the west. The ward covers an area of 0.7 km^{2} (0.27 sq mi), and has an average elevation of 18 m (59 ft). According to the 2012 census, the ward has a total population of 9,610.

== Administration ==
The postal code for Msambweni Ward is 21111. The ward is divided into the following neighborhoods (Mitaa):

- Mabawa
- Madina
- Msambweni "A"

- Msambweni "B"
- Msambweni "C"
- TAMTA

=== Government ===
The ward, like every other ward in the country, has local government offices based on the population served.The Msambweni Ward administration building houses a court as per the Ward Tribunal Act of 1988, including other vital departments for the administration the ward. The ward has the following administration offices:

- Msambweni Police Station
- Msambweni Government Office (Afisa Mtendaji)
- Msambweni Tribunal (Baraza La Kata) is a Department inside Ward Government Office

In the local government system of Tanzania, the ward is the smallest democratic unit. Each ward is composed of a committee of eight elected council members which include a chairperson, one salaried officer (with no voting rights), and an executive officer. One-third of seats are reserved for women councillors.

== Demographics ==
Like much of the district, the ward is the ancestral home of the Digo people and Segeju.

== Education and health ==
=== Education ===
The ward is home to these educational institutions:

- Msambweni Primary School
- Msambweni Secondary School

=== Healthcare ===
The ward is home to the following health institutions:

- Msambweni Health Center
