= Makorora =

Ward in Tanga City Council, Tanga Region

Makorora Kata ya Makorora (Swahili)
- Ward of Tanga City Council
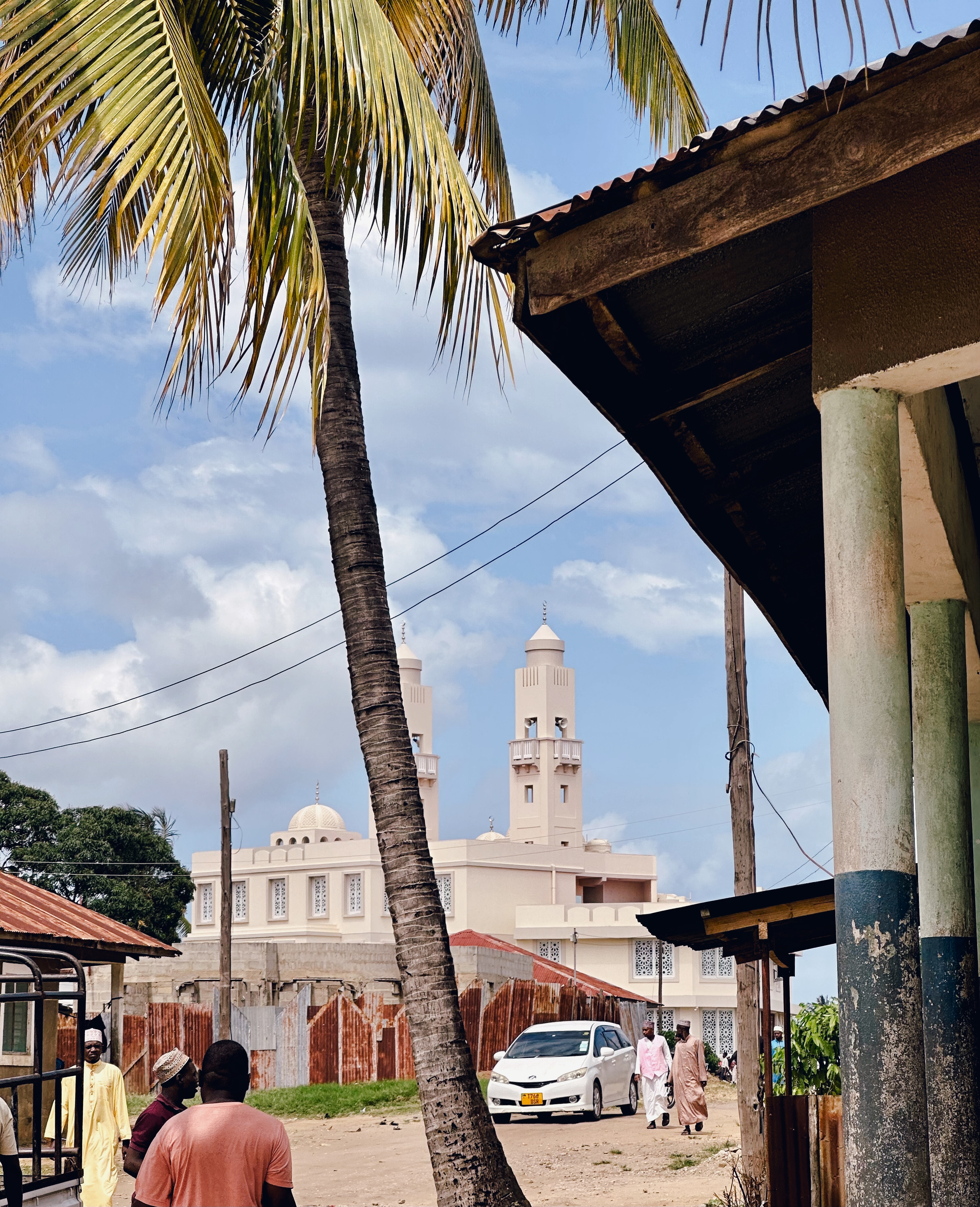
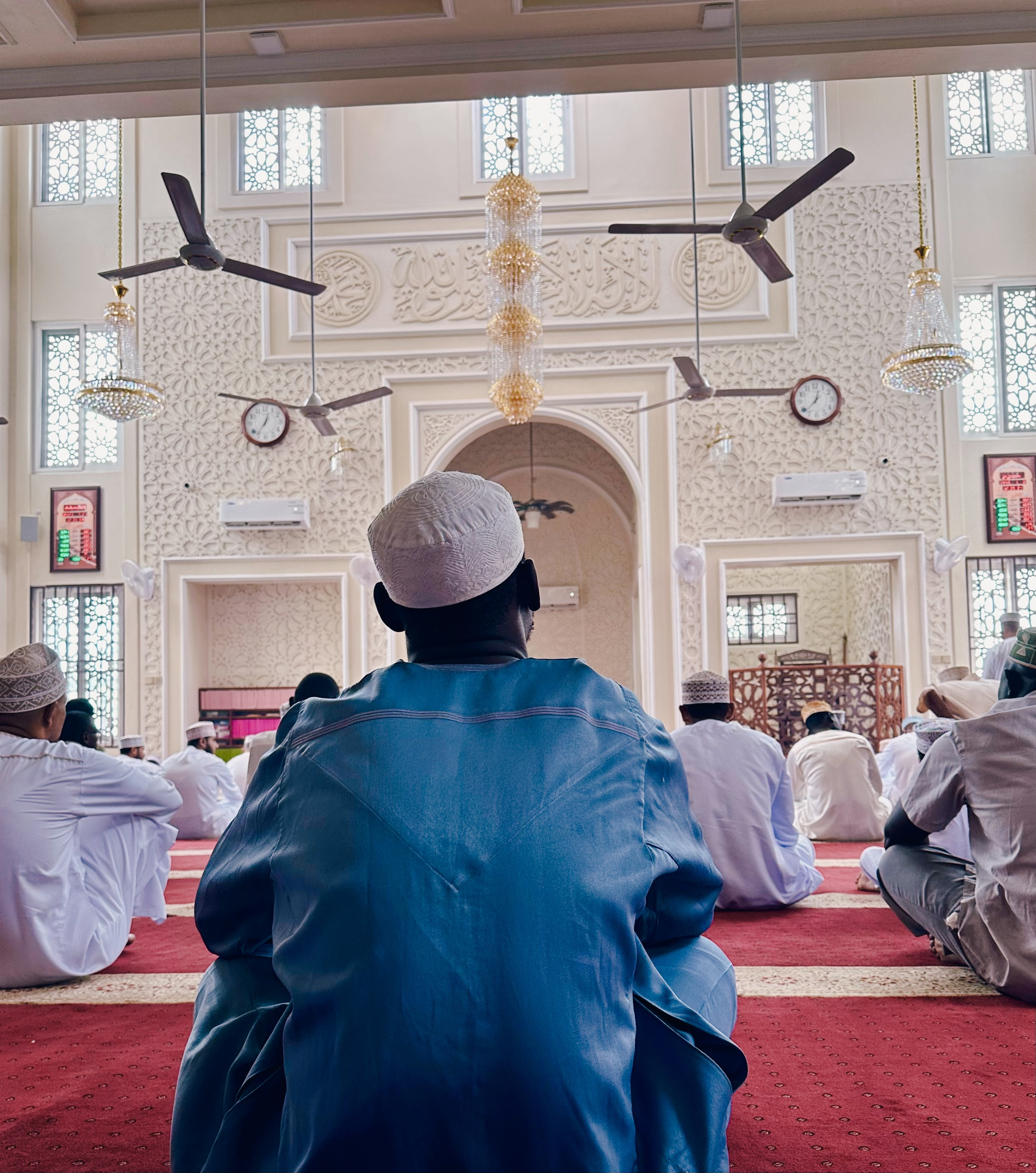
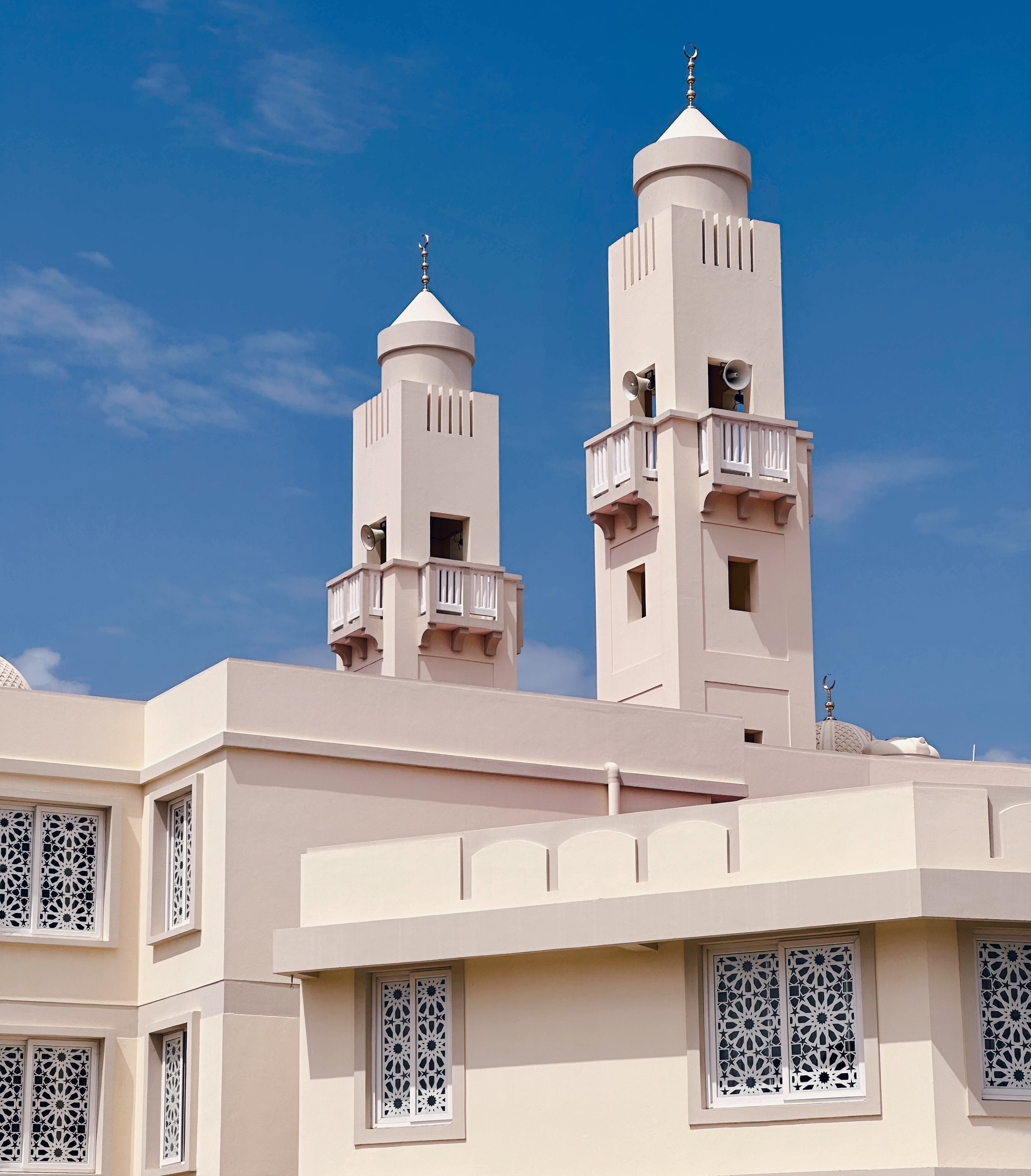
- From top to bottom: Street scape in Makorora, the interior of Masjid As Salaam of Makorora, The facade of Masjid As Salaam in Makorora
- Interactive map of Makorora
- Coordinates: 5°5′11.76″S 39°6′36″E
- Country: Tanzania
- Region: Tanga Region
- District: Tanga City Council

Area
  - Total: 1.1 km^{2} (0.42 sq mi)

Population (2012)
  - Total: 16,664

Ethnic groups
  - Settler: Swahili
  - Ancestral: Digo & Segeju
- Tanzanian Postal Code: 21109

Makorora (Kata ya Makorora , in Swahili) is an administrative ward in Tanga City Council of Tanga Region in Tanzania. Usagara and Ngamiani Kusini form the northern border of the ward. East of here is Mzingani. Mabawa ward is to the south. Msambweni is to the west. The ward covers an area of 1.1 km^{2} (0.42 sq mi), and has an average elevation of 18 m (59 ft). According to the 2012 census, the ward has a total population of 16,664.

== Administration ==
The postal code for Makorora Ward is 21109. The ward is divided into the following neighborhoods (Mitaa):

- Community "A"
- Community "B"
- Kombezi "A"

- Kombezi "B"
- Makorora Kati
- Mtakuja

=== Government ===
The ward, like every other ward in the country, has local government offices based on the population served.The Makorora Ward administration building houses a court as per the Ward Tribunal Act of 1988, including other vital departments for the administration the ward. The ward has the following administration offices:

- Makorora Police Station
- Makorora Government Office (Afisa Mtendaji)
- Makorora Tribunal (Baraza La Kata) is a Department inside Ward Government Office

In the local government system of Tanzania, the ward is the smallest democratic unit. Each ward is composed of a committee of eight elected council members which include a chairperson, one salaried officer (with no voting rights), and an executive officer. One-third of seats are reserved for women councillors.

== Demographics ==
Like much of the district, the ward is the ancestral home of the Digo people and Segeju.

== Education and health ==
=== Education ===
The ward is home to these educational institutions:

- Makorora Primary School
- Kombezi Primary School
- Azimio Primary School

=== Healthcare ===
The ward is home to the following health institutions:

- Makorora Health Center
