= Majengo, Tanga City Council =

Ward in Tanga City Council, Tanga Region

Majengo Kata ya Majengo (Swahili)
- Ward of Tanga City Council
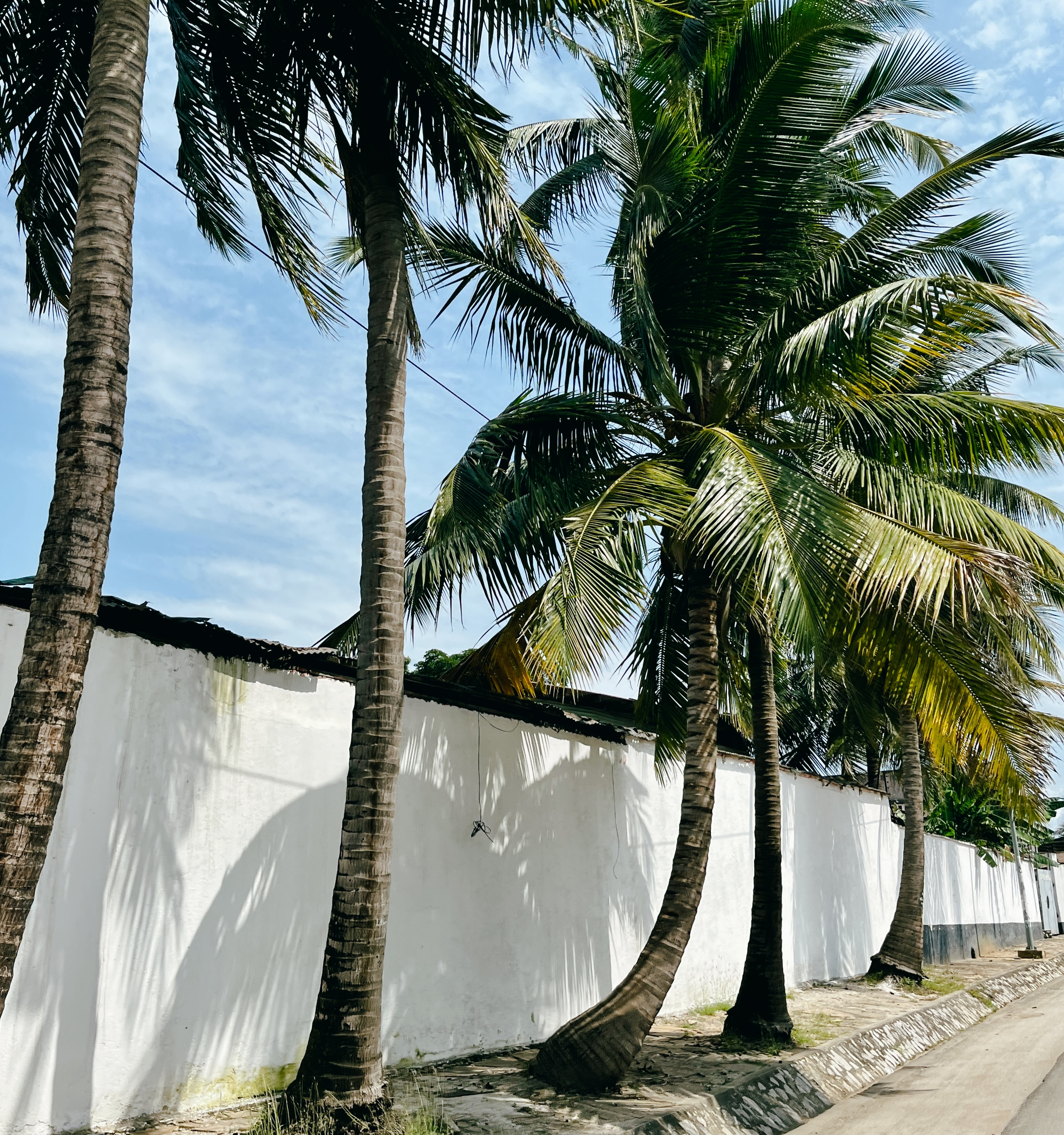
- From top to bottom: Coconut palms in a street in Majengo
- Interactive map of Majengo
- Coordinates: 5°4′51.96″S 39°5′36.6″E
- Country: Tanzania
- Region: Tanga Region
- District: Tanga City Council

Area
  - Total: 0.9 km^{2} (0.35 sq mi)

Population (2012)
  - Total: 7,482

Ethnic groups
  - Settler: Swahili
  - Ancestral: Digo & Segeju
- Tanzanian Postal Code: 21107

Majengo (Kata ya Majengo, in Swahili) is an administrative ward in Tanga City Council of Tanga Region in Tanzania. Central encircles the ward on its northern side. Ngamiani Kaskazini, Ngamiani Kati, and Ngamiani Kusini are to the east. The ward of Mwanzange is to the south. Chumbageni and Nguvumali are to the west. The ward covers an area of 0.9 km^{2} (0.35 sq mi), and has an average elevation of 17 m (56 ft). According to the 2012 census, the ward has a total population of 7,482.

== Administration ==
The postal code for Majengo Ward is 21107. The ward is divided into the following neighborhoods (Mitaa):

- Chuda Quarters
- Chuda Reli
- Chuda Youth
- Fadhili
- Kanisani

- Masiwani
- Tangulia
- Tawakali
- Anisa
- Tembo Bar
- Umba

=== Government ===
The ward, like every other ward in the country, has local government offices based on the population served.The Majengo Ward administration building houses a court as per the Ward Tribunal Act of 1988, including other vital departments for the administration the ward. The ward has the following administration offices:

- Majengo Government Office (Afisa Mtendaji)
- Majengo Tribunal (Baraza La Kata) is a Department inside Ward Government Office

In the local government system of Tanzania, the ward is the smallest democratic unit. Each ward is composed of a committee of eight elected council members which include a chairperson, one salaried officer (with no voting rights), and an executive officer. One-third of seats are reserved for women councillors.

== Demographics ==
Like much of the district, the ward is the ancestral home of the Digo people and Segeju.

== Education and health ==
=== Education ===
The ward is home to these educational institutions:

- Chuda Primary School
- Masiwani Primary School
- kana primary school
- chuma primary school

In majengo ward has one secondary school

- chuma secondary school

=== Healthcare ===
The ward is home to the following health institutions:

- Ngamiani Health Center
- Aga Khan Health Center
