= Usagara =

Ward in Tanga City Council, Tanga Region

Usagara Kata ya Usagara (Swahili)
- Ward of Tanga City Council
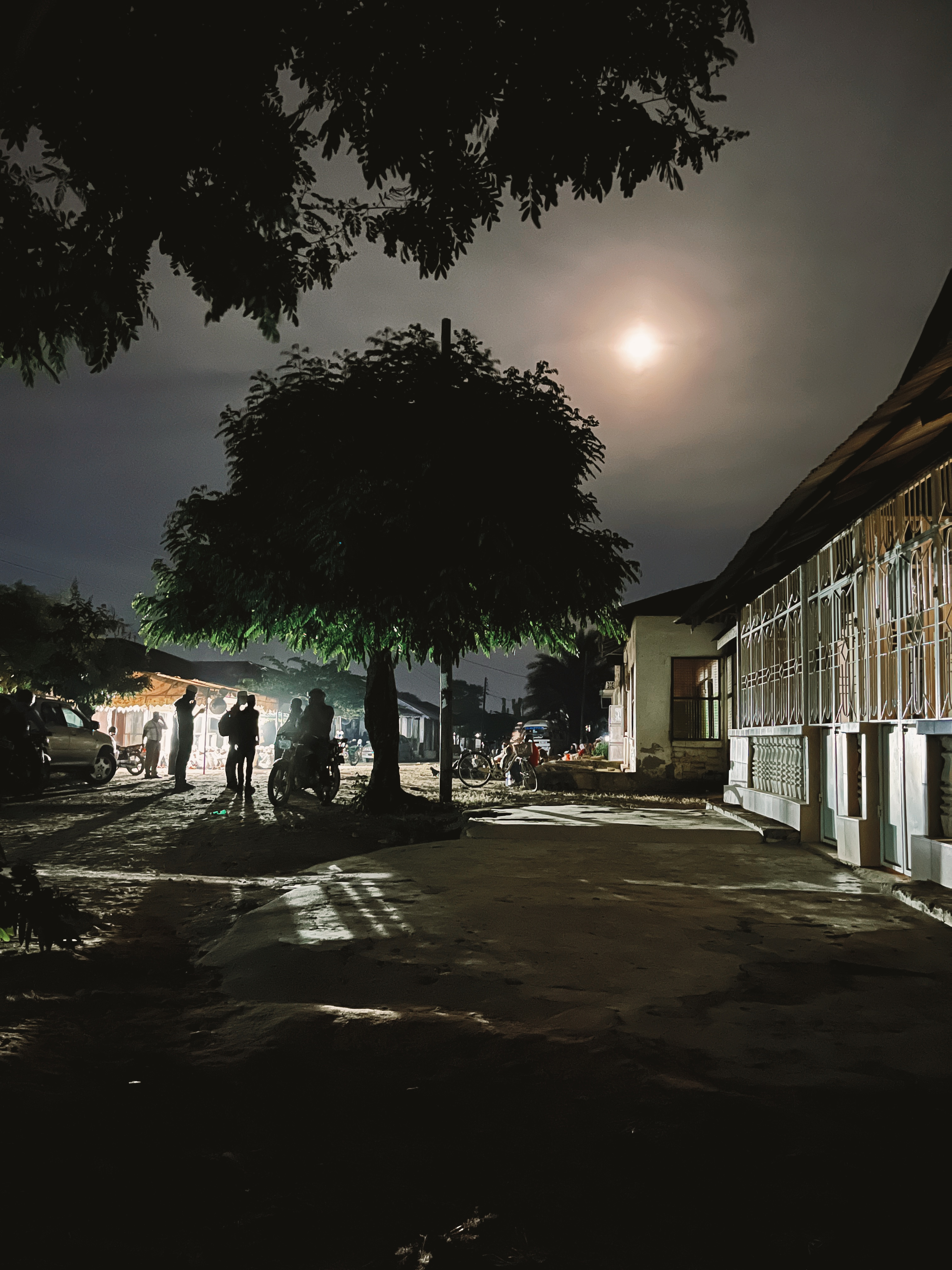
- From top to bottom: Wedding on a street in Usagara ward
- Interactive map of Usagara
- Coordinates: 5°4′34.32″S 39°6′36.72″E
- Country: Tanzania
- Region: Tanga Region
- District: Tanga City Council

Area
  - Total: 1.0 km^{2} (0.39 sq mi)

Population (2012)
  - Total: 10,330

Ethnic groups
  - Settler: Swahili
  - Ancestral: Digo & Segeju
- Tanzanian Postal Code: 21103

Usagara (Kata ya Usagara, in Swahili) is an administrative ward in Tanga City Council of Tanga Region in Tanzania. Central encircles the ward on its northern side. Mzingani is to the east, and Makorora is to the south. Ngamiani Kusini, Ngamiani Kati, and Ngamiani Kaskazini encircle the ward on its western side. The ward covers an area of 1 km^{2} (0.39 sq mi), and has an average elevation of 18 m (59 ft). According to the 2012 census, the ward has a total population of 10,330.

== Administration ==
The postal code for Usagara Ward is 21103. The ward is divided into the following neighborhoods (Mitaa):

- Usagara "A"
- Usagara "B"
- Usagara "C"

- Usagara Kati
- Usagara Kijiji

=== Government ===
The ward, like every other ward in the country, has local government offices based on the population served.The Usagara Ward administration building houses a court as per the Ward Tribunal Act of 1988, including other vital departments for the administration the ward. The ward has the following administration offices:

- Usagara Police Station
- Usagara Government Office (Afisa Mtendaji)
- Usagara Tribunal (Baraza La Kata) is a Department inside Ward Government Office

In the local government system of Tanzania, the ward is the smallest democratic unit. Each ward is composed of a committee of eight elected council members which include a chairperson, one salaried officer (with no voting rights), and an executive officer. One-third of seats are reserved for women councillors.

== Demographics ==
Like much of the district, the ward is the ancestral home of the Digo people and Segeju.

== Education and health ==
=== Education ===
The ward is home to these educational institutions:

- Usagara Primary School
- Usagara Secondary School

=== Healthcare ===
The ward is home to the following health institutions:

- Makorora Health Center
