= Marungu =

Ward in Tanga City Council, Tanga Region

Marungu Kata ya Marungu (Swahili)
- Ward of Tanga City Council
- From top to bottom
- Interactive map of Marungu
- Coordinates: 5°12′47.88″S 39°1′20.64″E
- Country: Tanzania
- Region: Tanga Region
- District: Tanga City Council

Area
  - Total: 42.1 km^{2} (16.3 sq mi)

Population (2012)
  - Total: 3,025

Ethnic groups
  - Settler: Swahili
  - Ancestral: Digo & Segeju
- Tanzanian Postal Code: 21209

Marungu (Kata ya Marungu , in Swahili) is an administrative ward in Tanga City Council of Tanga Region in Tanzania. Pongwe forms the ward's northern boundary. Tongoni is to the east. Kirare ward is in the south. Ngomeni of Muheza is located to the west. The ward covers an area of 42.1 km^{2} (16.3 sq mi), and has an average elevation of 17 m (56 ft). According to the 2012 census, the ward has a total population of 3,025.

== Administration ==
The postal code for Marungu Ward is 21209. The ward is divided into the following neighborhoods (Mitaa):

- Geza

- Marungu

=== Government ===
The ward, like every other ward in the country, has local government offices based on the population served.The Marungu Ward administration building houses a court as per the Ward Tribunal Act of 1988, including other vital departments for the administration the ward. The ward has the following administration offices:

- Marungu Police Station
- Marungu Government Office (Afisa Mtendaji)
- Marungu Tribunal (Baraza La Kata) is a Department inside Ward Government Office

In the local government system of Tanzania, the ward is the smallest democratic unit. Each ward is composed of a committee of eight elected council members which include a chairperson, one salaried officer (with no voting rights), and an executive officer. One-third of seats are reserved for women councillors.

== Demographics ==
Like much of the district, the ward is the ancestral home of the Digo people and Segeju.

== Education and health ==
=== Education ===
The ward is home to these educational institutions:

- Marungu Primary School
- Kwamkembe Primary School

=== Healthcare ===
The ward is home to the following health institutions:

- Marungu Health Center
