= Mabawa =

Ward in Tanga City Council, Tanga Region

Mabawa Kata ya Mabawa (Swahili)
- Ward of Tanga City Council
- From top to bottom
- Interactive map of Mabawa
- Coordinates: 5°5′59.64″S 39°6′7.92″E
- Country: Tanzania
- Region: Tanga Region
- District: Tanga City Council

Area
  - Total: 5.1 km^{2} (2.0 sq mi)

Population (2012)
  - Total: 35,125

Ethnic groups
  - Settler: Swahili
  - Ancestral: Digo & Segeju
- Tanzanian Postal Code: 21110

Mabawa (Kata ya Mabawa , in Swahili) is an administrative ward in Tanga City Council of Tanga Region in Tanzania. The ward is bounded to the north by the wards of Makorora and Msambweni. East of here is Mzingani. The Tangasisi ward is to the south. Duga ward is to the west. The ward covers an area of 5.1 km^{2} (2.0 sq mi), and has an average elevation of 19 m (62 ft). According to the 2012 census, the ward has a total population of 35,125.

== Administration ==
The postal code for Mabawa Ward is 21210. The ward is divided into the following neighborhoods (Mitaa):

- Donge
- Kwakaeza "A"
- Kwakaeza "B"
- Mabawa "A"

- Mabawa "B"
- Mikanjuni "A"
- Mikanjuni "B"
- TAPA

=== Government ===
The ward, like every other ward in the country, has local government offices based on the population served.The Mabawa Ward administration building houses a court as per the Ward Tribunal Act of 1988, including other vital departments for the administration the ward. The ward has the following administration offices:

- Mabawa Police Station
- Mabawa Government Office (Afisa Mtendaji)
- Mabawa Tribunal (Baraza La Kata) is a Department inside Ward Government Office

In the local government system of Tanzania, the ward is the smallest democratic unit. Each ward is composed of a committee of eight elected council members which include a chairperson, one salaried officer (with no voting rights), and an executive officer. One-third of seats are reserved for women councillors.

== Demographics ==
Like much of the district, the ward is the ancestral home of the Digo people and Segeju.

== Education and health ==
=== Education ===
The ward is home to these educational institutions:

- Mabawa Primary School
- Mikanjuni Primary
- Mwakizaro Primary School
- Ukombozi Primary School
- Donge Primary School
- Mwenge Primary School, Mabawa
- Mikanjuni Secondary School
- Magaoni Secondary School

=== Healthcare ===
The ward is home to the following health institutions:

- Mikanjuni Health Center
- Mungure Health Center
