= Ngamiani Kaskazini =

Ward in Tanga City Council, Tanga Region

Ngamiani Kaskazini Kata ya Ngamiani Kaskazini (Swahili)
- Ward of Tanga City Council
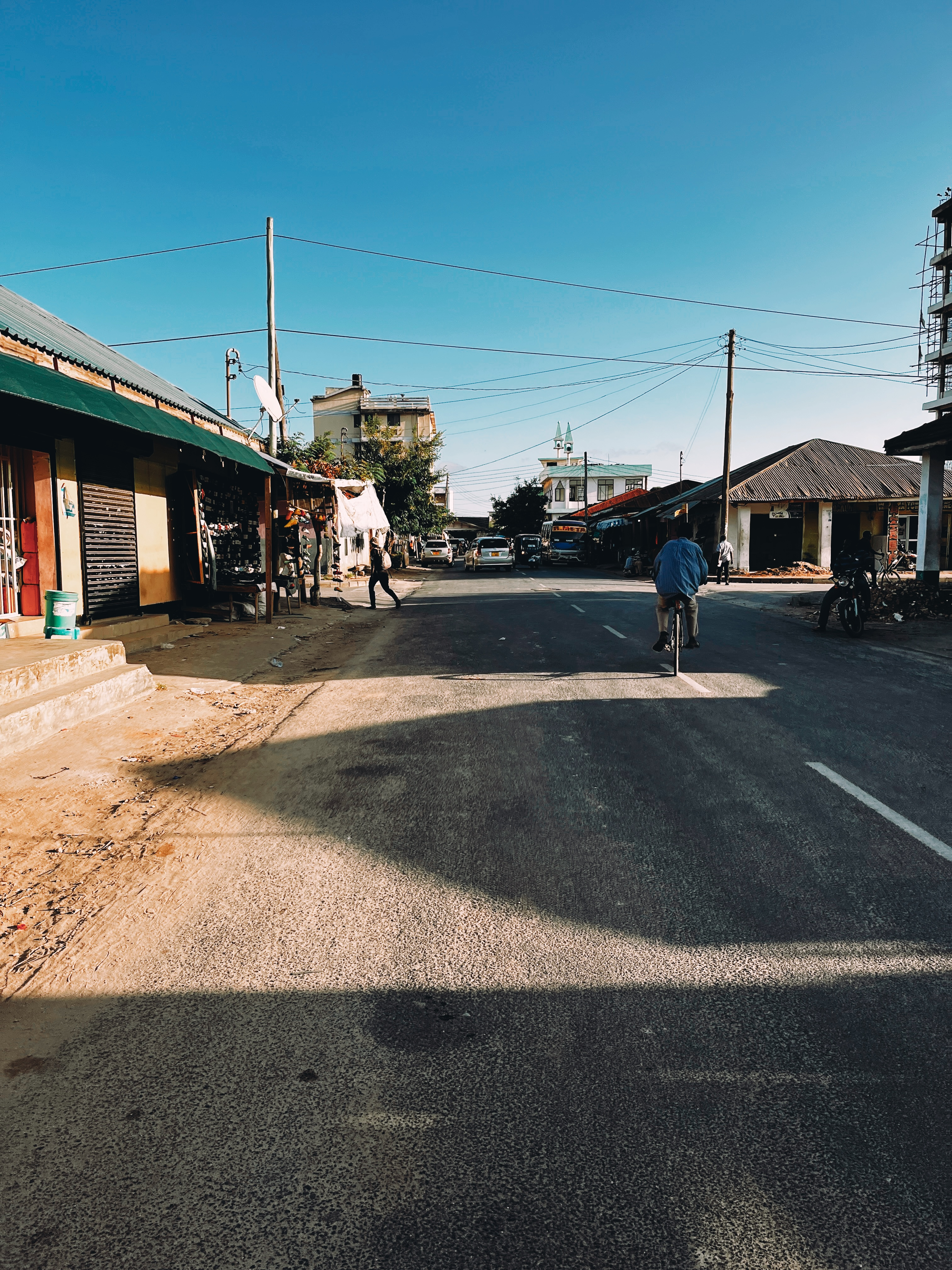
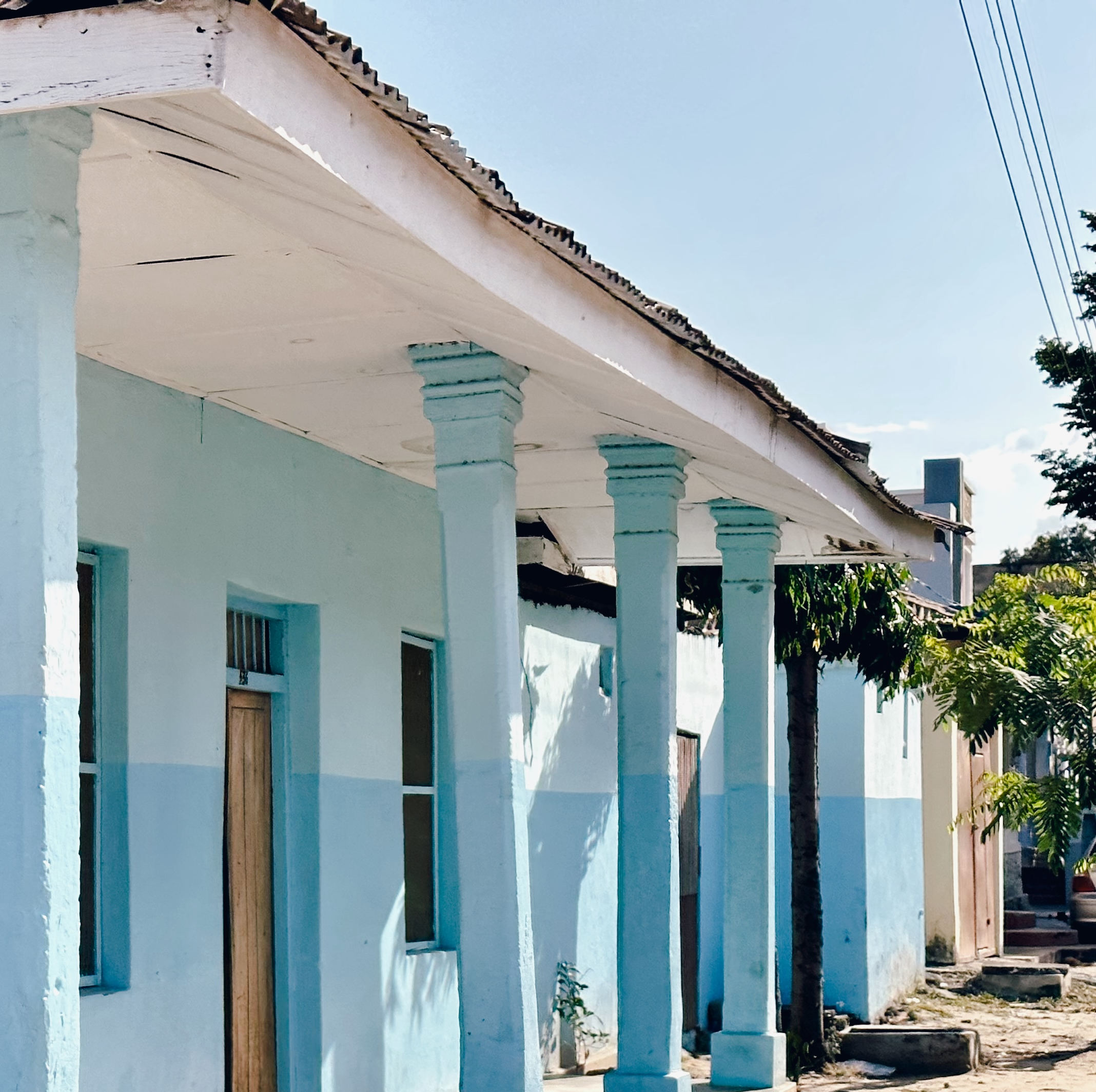
- From top to bottom: Street in Ngamiani Kaskazini & Swahili house in Ngamiani Kaskazini ward
- Interactive map of Ngamiani Kaskazini
- Coordinates: 5°4′0.012″S 39°6′14.04″E
- Country: Tanzania
- Region: Tanga Region
- District: Tanga City Council

Area
  - Total: 0.3 km^{2} (0.12 sq mi)

Population (2012)
  - Total: 3,910

Ethnic groups
  - Settler: Swahili
  - Ancestral: Digo & Segeju
- Tanzanian Postal Code: 21104

Ngamiani Kaskazini (Ngamiani Kaskazini, in Swahili) is an administrative ward in Tanga City Council of Tanga Region in Tanzania. Usagara and Central form the eastern and northern borders of the ward, respectively. Ngamiani Kati is to the south, and Majengo lies to the west. The ward covers an area of 0.3 km^{2} (0.12 sq mi), and has an average elevation of 10 m (33 ft). According to the 2012 census, the ward has a total population of 3,910.

== Administration ==
The postal code for Ngamiani Kaskazini Ward is 21202. The ward is divided into the following neighborhoods (Mitaa):

- Askari
- Karafuu
- Lumumba
- Makoko

- Maua
- Mkwakwani
- Pangani Road
- Swahili

=== Government ===
The ward, like every other ward in the country, has local government offices based on the population served.The Ngamiani Kaskazini Ward administration building houses a court as per the Ward Tribunal Act of 1988, including other vital departments for the administration the ward. The ward has the following administration offices:

- Ngamiani Kaskazini Police Station
- Ngamiani Kaskazini Government Office (Afisa Mtendaji)
- Ngamiani Kaskazini Tribunal (Baraza La Kata) is a Department inside Ward Government Office

In the local government system of Tanzania, the ward is the smallest democratic unit. Each ward is composed of a committee of eight elected council members which include a chairperson, one salaried officer (with no voting rights), and an executive officer. One-third of seats are reserved for women councillors.

== Demographics ==
Like much of the district, the ward is the ancestral home of the Digo people and Segeju.

== Education and health ==
=== Education ===
The ward is home to these educational institutions:

- Jabir Bin Zaid Primary School

=== Healthcare ===
The ward is home to the following health institutions:

- Al-Mohlem Health Center
