= Tongoni, Tanga City Council =

Ward in Tanga City Council, Tanga Region

Tongoni Kata ya Tongoni (Swahili)
- Ward of Tanga City Council
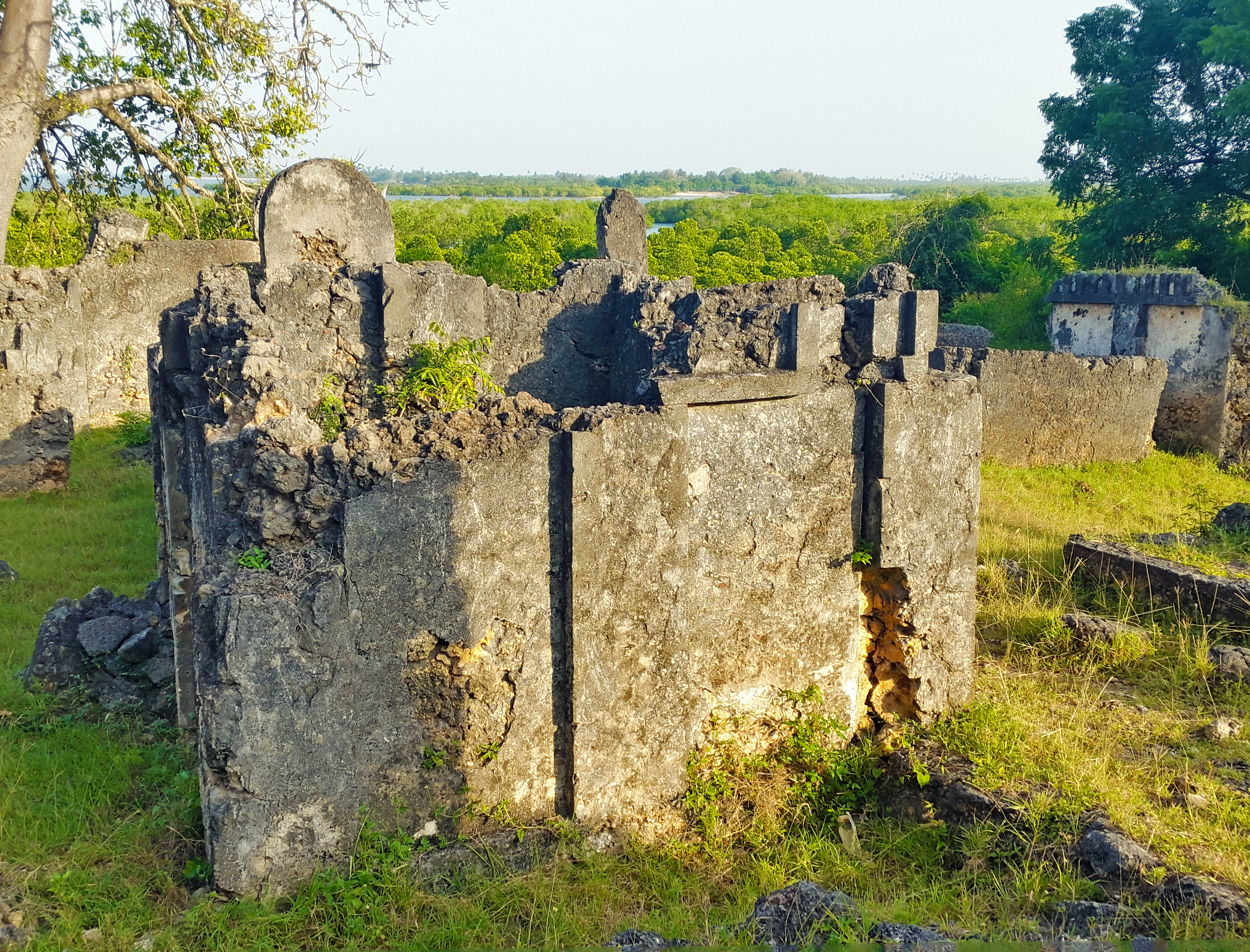
- From top to bottom: Tongoni Ruins in Tongoni ward
- Interactive map of Tongoni
- Coordinates: 5°13′31.8″S 39°4′53.04″E
- Country: Tanzania
- Region: Tanga Region
- District: Tanga City Council

Area
  - Total: 44 km^{2} (17 sq mi)

Population (2012)
  - Total: 4,594

Ethnic groups
  - Settler: Swahili
  - Ancestral: Digo & Segeju
- Tanzanian Postal Code: 21207

Tongoni (Kata ya Tongoni, in Swahili) is an administrative ward in Tanga City Council of Tanga Region in Tanzania. Tangasisi and Maweni wards form the ward's northern and western boundaries. The Pemba Channel forms the eastern boundary. The Kigombe Ward of Muheza is to the south. The wards of Kirare and Marungu are to the west. The ward covers an area of 44 km^{2} (17 sq mi), and has an average elevation of 30 m (98 ft). According to the 2012 census, the ward has a total population of 4,594. Tongoni ward is the home to the Tongoni ruins, a Medieval Swahili town.

== Administration ==
The postal code for Tongoni Ward is 21112. The ward is divided into the following neighborhoods (Mitaa):

- Maere
- Mwarongo

- Tongoni

=== Government ===
The ward, like every other ward in the country, has local government offices based on the population served.The Tongoni Ward administration building houses a court as per the Ward Tribunal Act of 1988, including other vital departments for the administration the ward. The ward has the following administration offices:

- Tongoni Police Station
- Tongoni Government Office (Afisa Mtendaji)
- Tongoni Tribunal (Baraza La Kata) is a Department inside Ward Government Office

In the local government system of Tanzania, the ward is the smallest democratic unit. Each ward is composed of a committee of eight elected council members which include a chairperson, one salaried officer (with no voting rights), and an executive officer. One-third of seats are reserved for women councillors.

== Demographics ==
Like much of the district, the ward is the ancestral home of the Digo people and Segeju.

== Education and health ==
=== Education ===
The ward is home to these educational institutions:

- Tongoni Primary School
- Mwarongo Primary School
- Tongoni Secondary School

=== Healthcare ===
The ward is home to the following health institutions:

- Tongoni Health Center
- Mwarongo Health Center
