= Mzingani =

Ward in Tanga City Council, Tanga Region

Mzingani Kata ya Mzingani (Swahili)
- Ward of Tanga City Council
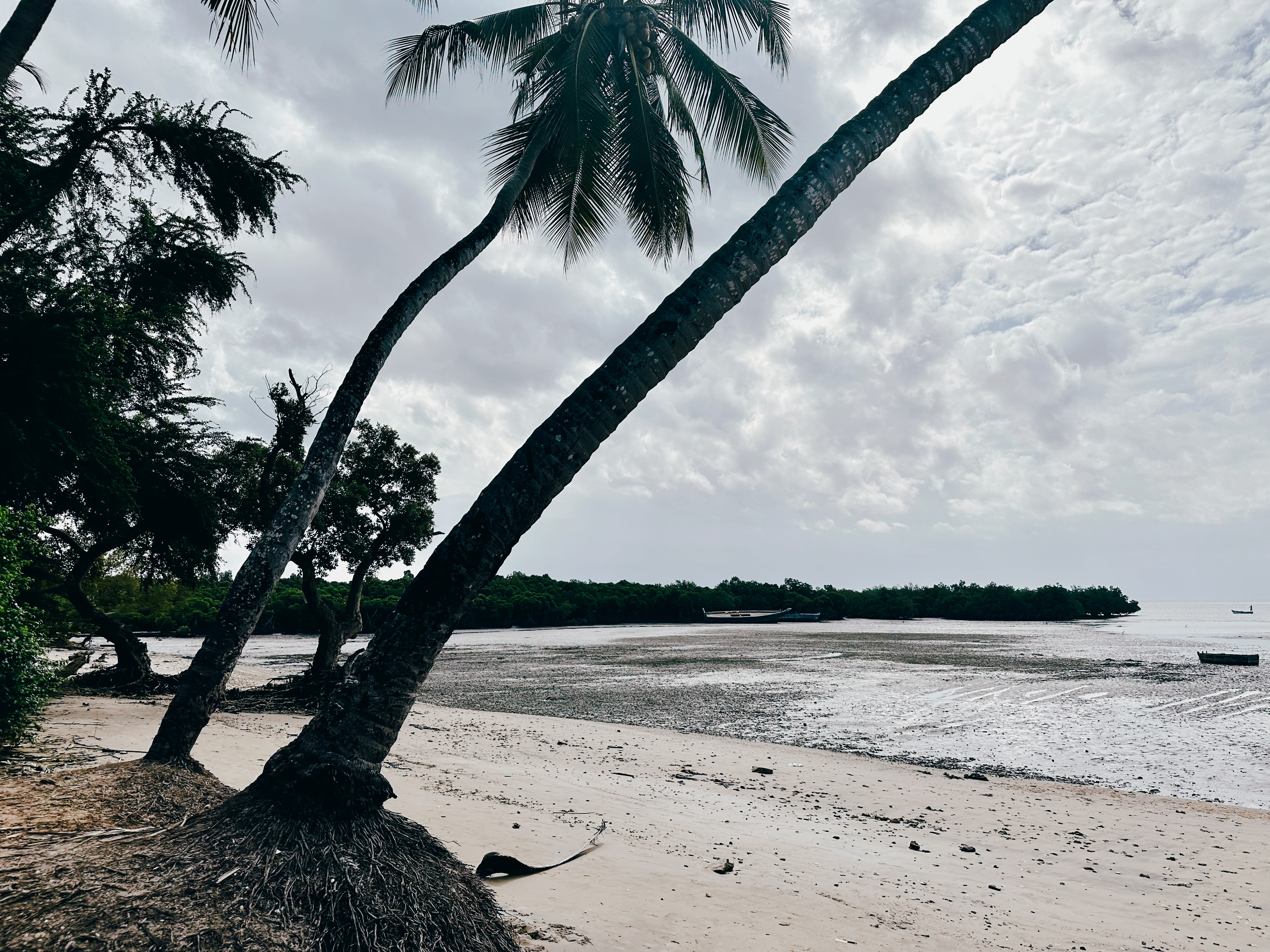
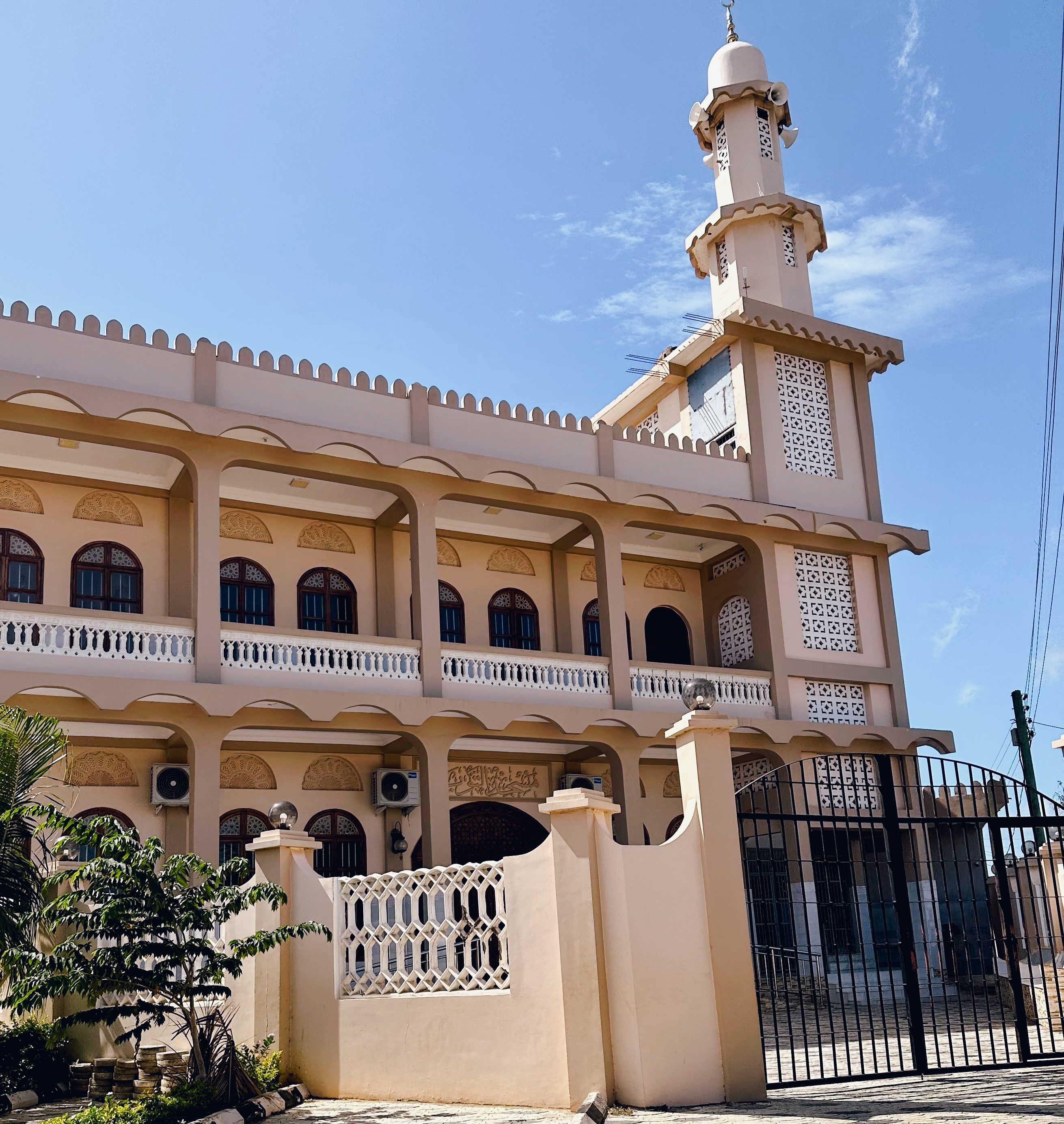
- From top to bottom: Beach in Mzingani ward and Tawbaa Mosque of Mzingani
- Interactive map of Mzingani
- Coordinates: 5°4′51.96″S 39°7′26.04″E
- Country: Tanzania
- Region: Tanga Region
- District: Tanga City Council

Area
  - Total: 8.1 km^{2} (3.1 sq mi)

Population (2012)
  - Total: 29,041

Ethnic groups
  - Settler: Swahili
  - Ancestral: Digo & Segeju
- Tanzanian Postal Code: 21102

Mzingani (Kata ya Mzingani , in Swahili) is an administrative ward in Tanga City Council of Tanga Region in Tanzania. Central ward encircles the ward on its northern side. The Pemba Channel is located to the east. Tangasisi forms the southern boundary of the ward. Mabawa, Makorora, and Usagara wards are to the west. The ward covers an area of 8.1 km^{2} (3.1 sq mi), and has an average elevation of 7 m (23 ft). According to the 2012 census, the ward has a total population of 29,041.

== Administration ==
The postal code for Mzingani Ward is 21102. The ward is divided into the following neighborhoods (Mitaa):

- Bondeni
- Majengo Mpaya
- Mbolea
- Msikitini

- Muheza
- Mzingani
- Sahare
- Suji

=== Government ===
The ward, like every other ward in the country, has local government offices based on the population served.The Mzingani Ward administration building houses a court as per the Ward Tribunal Act of 1988, including other vital departments for the administration the ward. The ward has the following administration offices:

- Mzingani Police Station
- Mzingani Government Office (Afisa Mtendaji)
- Mzingani Tribunal (Baraza La Kata) is a Department inside Ward Government Office

In the local government system of Tanzania, the ward is the smallest democratic unit. Each ward is composed of a committee of eight elected council members which include a chairperson, one salaried officer (with no voting rights), and an executive officer. One-third of seats are reserved for women councillors.

== Demographics ==
Like much of the district, the ward is the ancestral home of the Digo people and Segeju.

== Education and health ==
=== Education ===
The ward is home to these educational institutions:

- Mzingani Primary School
- Mnazi Mmjoa Primary School
- Sahare Secondary School
- Kihere Secondary School

=== Healthcare ===
The ward is home to the following health institutions:

- Afriwag Health Center
- Magomeni Health Center, Mzingani
