= Tanga City Council =

District of Tanga Region, Tanzania

Tanga City Council Halmashauri ya Jiji la Tanga (Swahili)
- District of Tanga
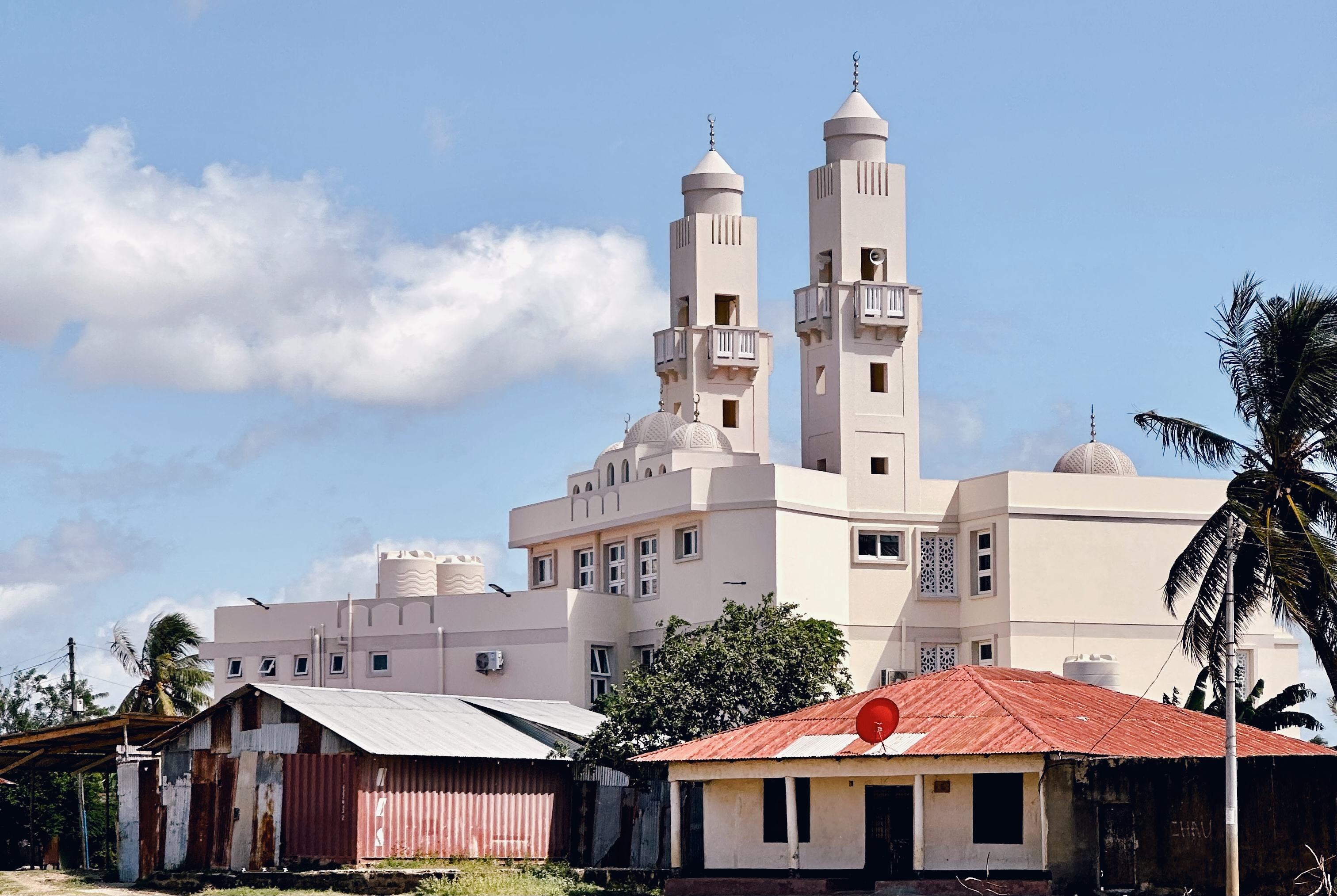
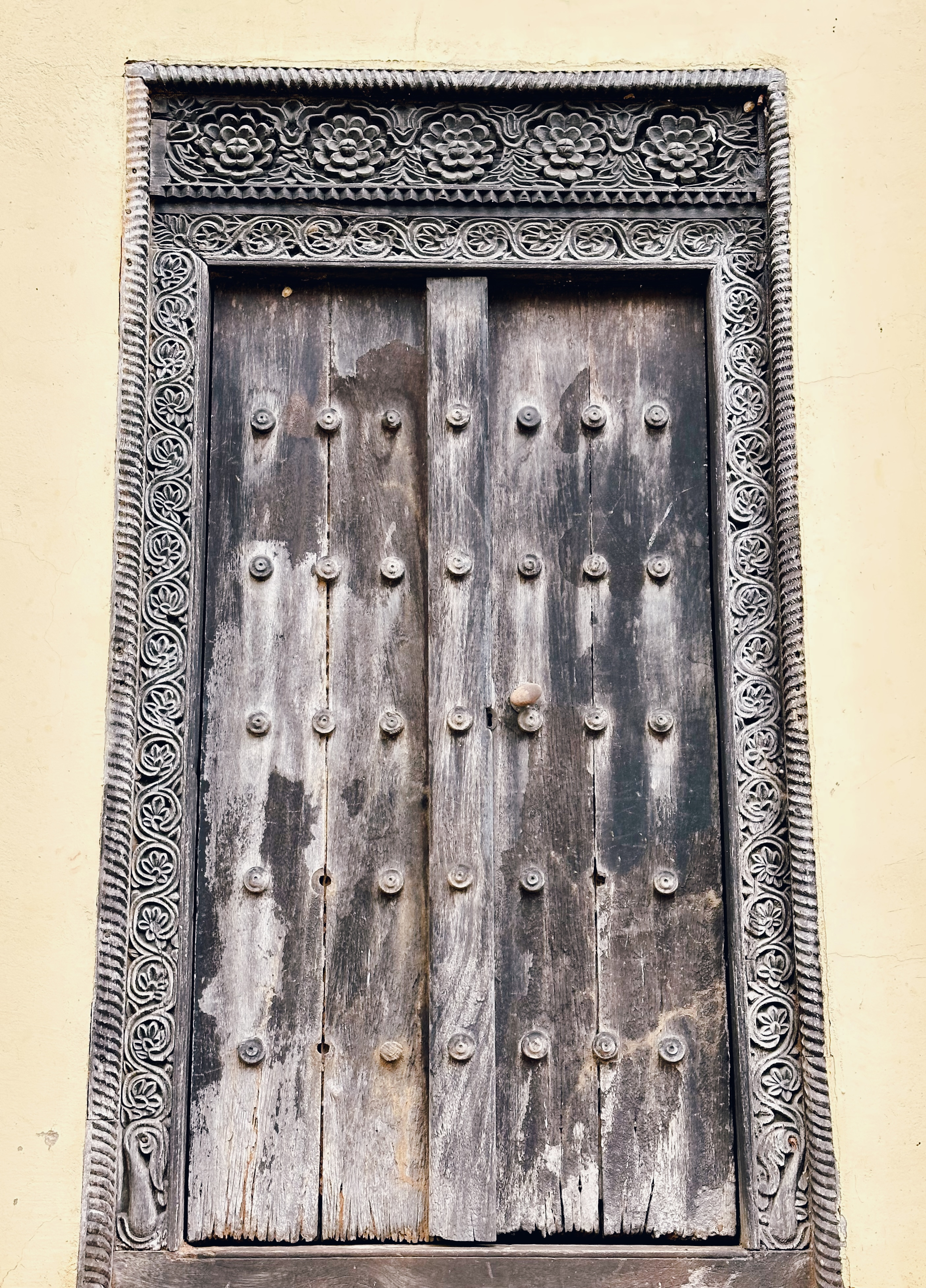
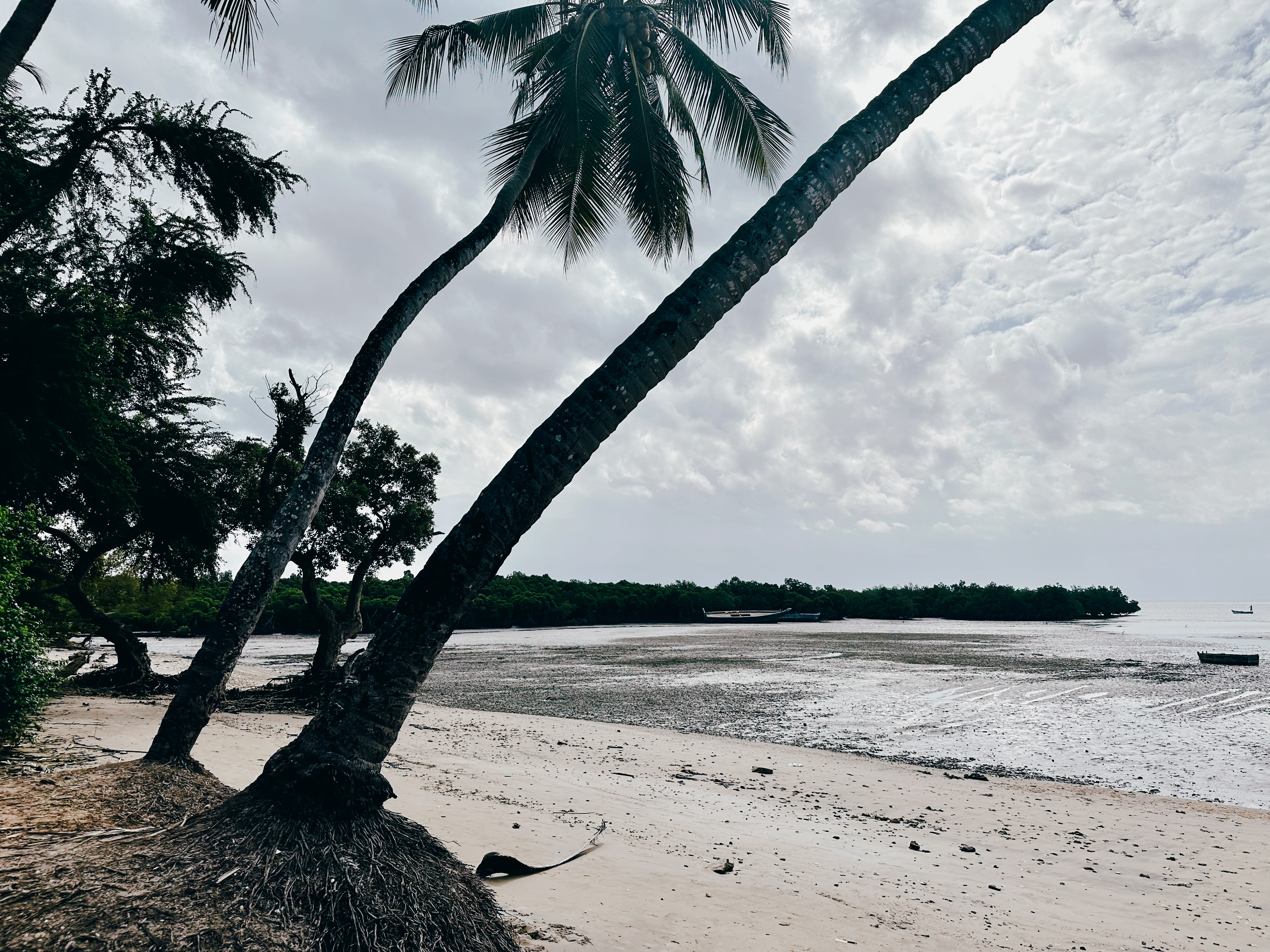
- From top to bottom: Masjid As Salaam in Makorora ward of Tanga City, 19th century Swahili door at Tanga Urithi Museum & Mangrove and beach at Mzingani ward of Tanga City
- Nickname: The economic heart of Tanga
- Tanga City in Tanga
- Coordinates: 5°52′48″S 35°7′35.4″E
- Country: Tanzania
- Region: Tanga Region
- Capital: Central

Area
  - Total: 596.5 km^{2} (230.3 sq mi)
  - Rank: 10th in Tanga

Population (2022 census)
  - Total: 393,429
  - Rank: 3rd in Tanga
  - Density: 659.6/km^{2} (1,708/sq mi)

Ethnic groups
  - Settler: Swahili
  - Native: Digo, Segeju & Bondei
- Time zone: UTC+3 (EAT)
- Tanzanian Postcode: 211
- Website: Official website
- Symbols of Tanzania
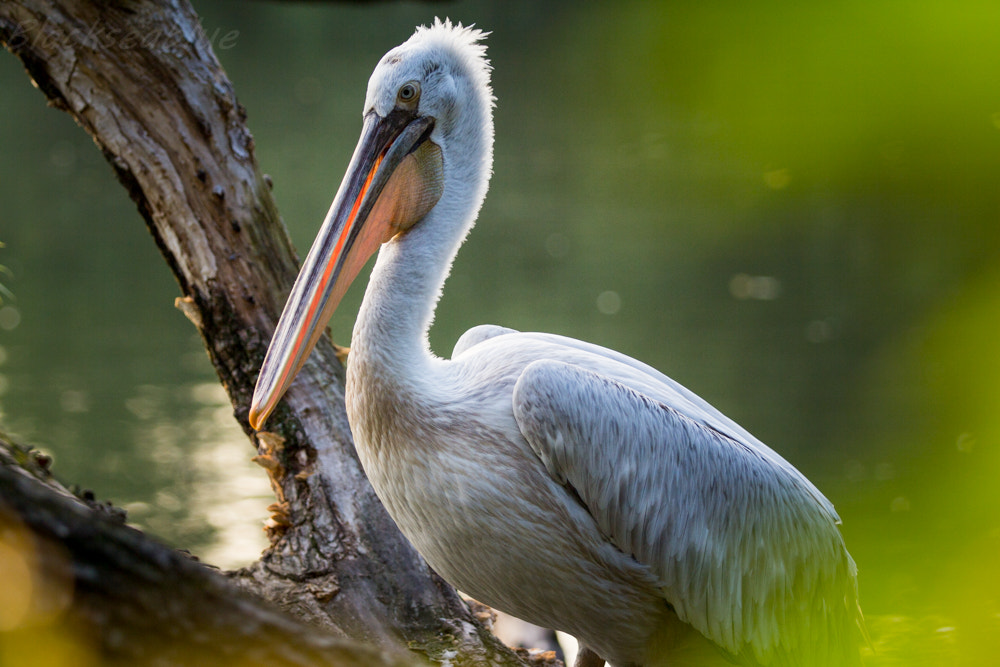
- Bird: Pink-backed pelican

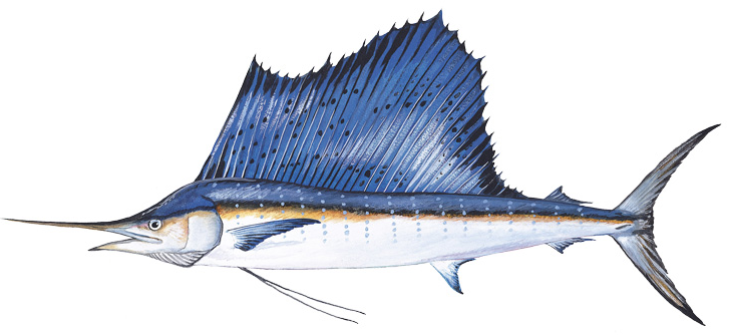
- Fish: Sailfish
- Mammal: African sheath-tailed bat

Tanga City Council (Halimashauri ya Jiji la Tanga, in Swahili) is one of eleven administrative districts of Tanga Region in Tanzania. The District covers an area of 596.5 km^{2} (230.3 sq mi) of which includes the historic city of Tanga and the Port of Tanga. Tanga district is bordered to the north by Mkinga District, to the east by the Indian Ocean, to the south and west by Muheza District. The district is comparable in size to the land area of Guam. The administrative seat is the ward Central . The district is the administrative and economic center of Tanga Region. In Swahili, the word Tanga means "sail". The City was also the theater for the battle of Tanga. According to the 2022 census, the district has a total population of 393,429.

== Administrative subdivisions ==
As of 2012, Tanga District was administratively divided into 24 wards. As of 2022, Tanga City Council is composed of 4 divisions, each of which is further divided into 27 administrative wards. Nine of these, including Chongoleani, Mabokweni, Mzizima, Kiomoni, Kirare, Marungu, Tongoni, Masiwani Maweni, and Pongweu, are peri-urban areas. Of these, 18 are urban. 181 Mitaas make up the next division of the city.

=== Wards as of 2012 ===
1. Central
2. Chongoleani
3. Chumbageni
4. Duga
5. Kiomoni
6. Kirare
7. Mabawa
8. Mabokweni
9. Majengo
10. Makorora
11. Marungu
12. Maweni

1. Msambweni
2. Mwanzange
3. Mzingani
4. Mzizima
5. Ngamiani Kaskazini
6. Ngamiani Kati
7. Ngamiani Kusini
8. Nguvumali
9. Pongwe
10. Tangasisi
11. Tongoni
12. Usagara

Additional wards in 2022:

1. Magaoni
2. Masiwani
3. Myanjani

== History ==
Segeju and Digo people, who have long subsisted off the land and the water, were the first to settle in the area that is now Tanga City. In Tongoni, the Swahili city states first appeared in the ninth century and went into decline by the fifteenth century. Northeastern Tanzania's administrative capital and largest port, Tanga, has a long history. In the fourteenth century, Swahili and Shirazi traders founded the current settlement on Tanga bay's Toten Island.

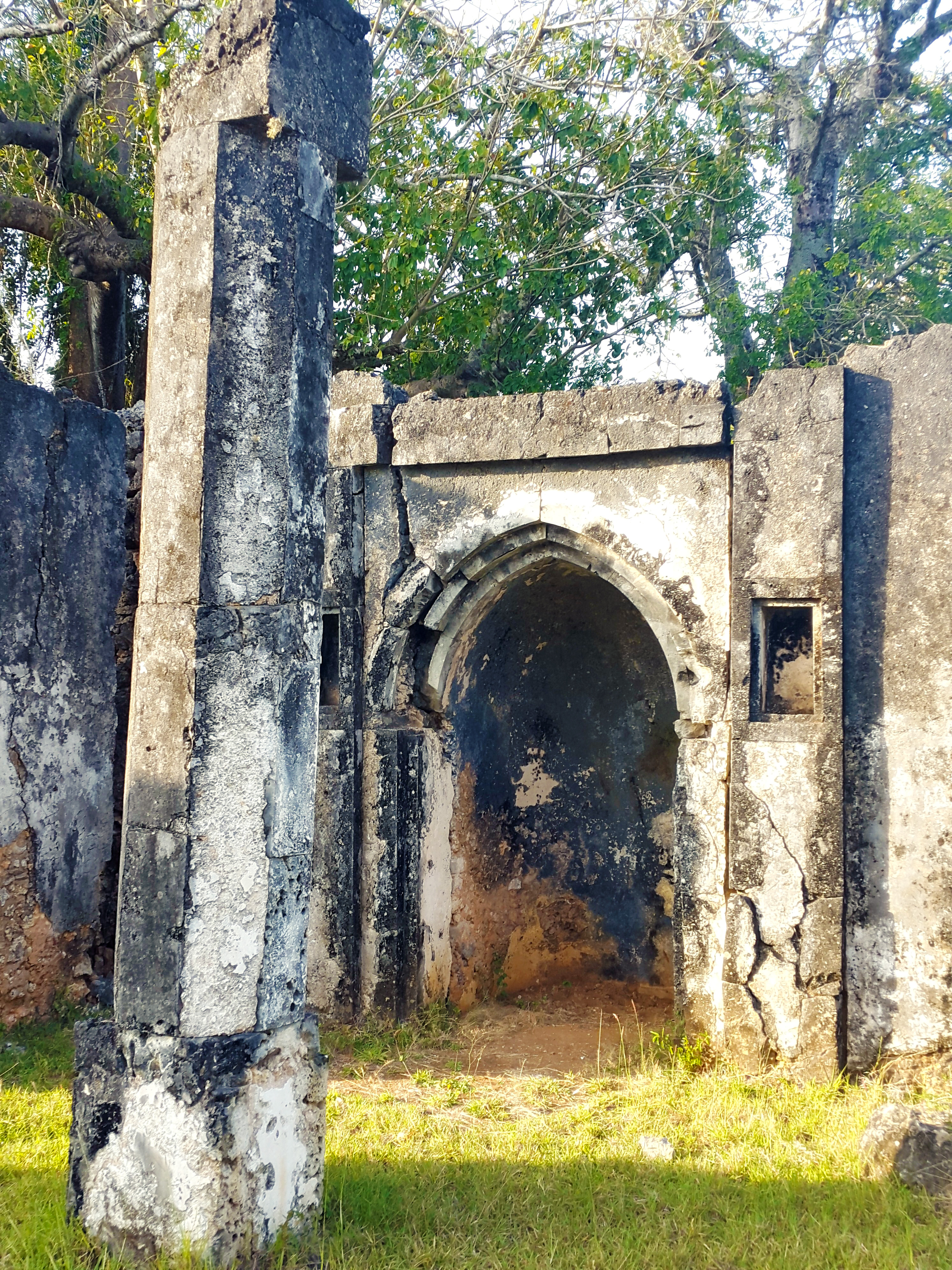
Old Swahili mosque at Tongoni Ruins in Tongoni ward, Tanga City Council.

Tanga's earliest written records date back to the Portuguese. The Portuguese created a trading post as a part of their East African coastal dominion, and between 1500 and 1700, they ruled the area for more than 200 years.

The region was first occupied by Germany in the early 1880s, and later it was settled by Germans. German East Africa picked Tanga as a military outpost in 1889, and in 1891 it was designated as a district office. Since independence of Tanganyika, Tanga City has been essential to the development of the national economy by connecting areas, people, and things and facilitating trade and social contact.

In the 1890s, when Germany was still in control of Tanga, the city underwent significant development as a result of German colonial administration. Tanga's port facilities were modernized, the Tanga to Moshi railway encouraged agricultural development, a tram line was developed within the city to facilitate domestic transport, a port was also built to facilitate exports, and Tanga became the region's main port for the export of sisal and coffee, the latter from the Usambaras. The British took over following the end of World War I, and the railway was completed from Mnyusi to Ruvu on the principal line, providing Tanga with a direct rail link to the capital Dar es Salaam. The Tanganyika Territory African Civil Services Association was established in 1922 and had its headquarters in Tanga, the first recognized modern native governmental entity at the time.

== Geography ==
In the Northern East of Tanzania's Mainland, Tanga City is situated along the Western Indian Ocean between the longitudes of 38°53' and 39°10' East and the latitudes of 5°00' and 5°16' South. It functions as the second-largest port in the nation as well as the administrative and commercial hub for the Tanga Region. Between 0 and 17 meters above sea level, it stretches 20 kilometers inland from the coast. There are streams, valleys, and undulating hills throughout the landscape. It takes up 600 square kilometers of land.

The city has a total area of 662 km2, of which 600 km2 or 90.63% is made up of land, and 62 km2 or 9.37% is made up of water bodies, mostly the Indian Ocean. Approximately 20 kilometers inland from the shore, the geography of the city continues. From 0 to 17 meters are above sea level. The Zigi, Nzimwi, and Utofu rivers and streams, as well as the Mgombani/Kakindu and Gombero rivers, are prominent in the north and the south, respectively, as are small sloping hills that are broken up by valleys with rivers and streams.

The entire land area of Tanga City is 60,000 hectares, of which only 9,620 hectares, or 37.73 percent of arable land, are exploited for crop production. Of this total, 25,494 hectares, or 42.49 percent, are designated as arable land and hence suitable for crop farming. Other economic and social activities are carried out on the remaining 34,506hectares (57.51%).

=== Climate ===
The weather of Tanga is categorized as tropical, with rainier winters than summers, according to the Köppen climate classification. Tanga city's average temperature is 26.3 °C. Each year, precipitation totals around 1290 mm.With an average of 27 mm, February has the least amount of precipitation. With an average rainfall of 294 mm in May and an average annual temperature of 28.4 °C, March is the hottest month of the year. August has the lowest annual average temperature, hovering at 24.2 °C. However, the mangrove vegetation and coastal dampness have an impact on the climate of Tanga City Council.

The annual rainfall ranges from 600 to 1400 mm, depending on the year and the region. The two seasons of rain are "vuli" (October to December) and "masika," or heavy rain (March to May). Despite irregular and unpredictable precipitation, the zone is somewhat productive due to the comparatively high soil fertility.

== Economy ==
After a decline brought on by the collapse of the sisal export market between 1960 and 1970, Tanga's economy is currently seeing a resurgence. As a result of expanded markets, privatization, improved infrastructure, and more government backing for investment, new large and small scale industries and businesses are emerging. This resurgence has also been aided by the expansion of import and export through Tanga's port.

The economy of Tanga City Council is largely dependent on trade, industries, small- and medium-sized businesses, as well as agriculture and livestock keeping, which the latter still employs over 90% of the city's population and accounts for nearly 90% of the city's GDP. The remaining 10% is made up of contributions from other industries, including those that provide services, tourism, transportation, financial services, construction, mining, sports and culture.

=== Infrastructure ===
==== Energy ====
The national power grid provides service to Tanga City, which uses roughly 21 to 22 Megawatts (MW), or about one-third of the 66 Megawatts supplied to the area. The city is powered by 100% hydroelectricity, with stations at Mwakinyumbi on the Pangani River. About 17,500 and 21,000 KW are respectively the combined producing capacities of Pangani Falls Dam Hydro Plant and Hale Hydro Plant. The grid also connects to additional hydroelectric plants, including Mtera on the Great Ruaha River and Nyumba ya Mungu on the Pangani River. Power supply are adequate to meet increasing industrial and other demands. Additionally, there is significant growth in the development of solar and wind-generated electricity at different scales, including in private residences and organizations like hospitals.

==== Water and Sanitation ====
Water is readily available in Tanga City because to the Zigi River. The daily requirement for water is 26,000 m3, whereas the maximum processing capacity is 42,000 m3. The Tanga Urban Water Authority offers services where there is a water network, including in certain village communities and urban regions.

==== Transport ====
All forms of transportation—road, rail, water, and air, all serve Tanga City, with the road and river dominating the flow of people and commodities. The city's road network is reasonably good and accessible all year long, connecting it to other cities, regions, and countries.The 1,024.6 km of the road network are made up of 105 km of tarmac, 184.8 km of gravel, and 744.30 km of earth roads. Regarding air travel, the city's Kange airport handles small planes and offers access to Pemba, Dar es Salaam, and occasionally other adjacent regions and countries. 30,967 passengers and 5,486 aircraft trips are registered on average from the Tanga Airport.

==== Mass Communication ====
Throughout the year, all parts of Tanga City have access to the postal service, telephone services, including mobile phones, courier services, and internet services. The Tanzania Posts Corporation (TPC), which also offers internet labs and other commercial providers, handles postal services such as handling of freight and mail, money transfers, the selling of postage stamps, and Expected Mail Services (EMS).

The City Council is a part of the "National ICT Broadband Backbone" and is covered by several cellular service providers, including Tanzania Telecommunication Company (TTCL), Vodacom, Tigo, Airtel, Zantel, and Halotel. Information and communication technology (ICT) is not widely used or accessible, yet there are numerous internet cafes across the city.There are four radio stations in the city, and television services from TBC, ITV, Star TV, Azam TV, EATV, Clouds, and Tanga TV are widely liked national content providers (broadcasters) as well.

=== Agriculture ===
In Tanga City Council, agriculture makes up roughly 26.7% of the total revenue from own sources (crops 4.4% and livestock 22.2%). The industry has successfully produced surpluses of maize, the main food crop grown in the council, and has ensured food security. Along with raising crops, people also keep cattle as an additional source of food and money. More than 70% of the city's inhabitants are thought to rely on farming and raising livestock for a living. The information displays the estimated total land area.

Cassava, maize, and cowpeas are three of the main food crops farmed in the Tanga City Council. The council was able to harvest 12,069 tons of cassava, 1,925 tons of maize, and 57 tons of cowpeas for food during the 2019–20 season. Sisal, cashew nuts, coconut, mangoes, and oranges are the main cash crops grown in Tanga council. The council was able to harvest cash crops totaling 4,440 tons (coconut), 2,112 tons (mangoes), 1,917 tons (oranges), 1,000 tons (sisal), and 239 tons (cashew nuts) over the course of the fiscal years 2018/19 to 2020/21.

=== Fishing ===
About 15% of the population of Tanga City Council depends on fishing for a living, making it one of the main economic activities that people engage in. The Tanga City Council also receives income from fishing-related activities, with money from license and auction fees making up around 9% of the budget for the council. Fish caught in the Indian Ocean and produced in privately owned aquaculture facilities are the main sources of fish products used by Tanga City Council.

The catch is transported to various regions of Tanzania and exported outside of the country for consumption. The harvested fish products, including as red snapper, kingfish, small pelagic, etc., are sold by auction in two main fish landing sites at Kasera, Deep Sea, Mchukuuni and Tongoni.Since there is no fish market in the city, the council hopes to build one near the deep-sea landing location. Fishing equipment used by fishermen includes nets, hooks, longlines, fish traps, and a small number of divers. Fishermen primarily employ canoe dugouts, dhows, and local boats. Small pelagic are prepared for sale to consumers domestically and in big quantities are exported to the Democratic Republic of the Congo by being pickled and salted.

Aquaculture is primarily carried out in ponds in Tanga City Council by private persons. The most common species raised in these ponds is tilapia. According to the data that is currently available, 230,184 kg of fish worth TZS 16,112,880,000.0 were harvested from the sea during 2019–20 as opposed to 970 kg from ponds.

=== Industry and trade ===
Tanga City, Tanzania's fourth-largest population center, second-largest port, and third-largest industrial hub, serves as the administrative center for the Tanga region. The city has a strategic geographic location that gives it a competitive business advantage because it is situated on the Indian Ocean and close to the Kenyan border. With the second-largest port in Tanzania and a significant railroad terminus that connects most of the interior of northern Tanzania with the sea, it boasts some of the strongest economic and social infrastructure in the nation.

The harbor and its surroundings serve as Tanga's social and economic hub. Its markets are spread throughout a number of neighborhoods. The City and Central Line, which connects to the Great Lakes region and the Tanzanian capital of Dar es Salaam, are connected by the Tanga-Moshi train line. is also well connected to significant markets in Tanzania, Eastern Africa, and Central Africa via roads and telecommunications. Tanga Airport, located in the heart of the city, offers air service to other urban and tourist destinations across the nation. The nearby islands of Pemba and Zanzibar, which are located across the channel, are also prospective markets for commerce. Sisal from the hinterland, coffee from the Kilimanjaro and Arusha regions, tea from Amani, and cotton from Lushoto are among the main exports from the port of Tanga.

The production of sisal, rail and port services, industrial production, fishing, and general merchandise were the key economic drivers in the area. Following this circumstance, the city saw the establishment of numerous enterprises and processing facilities. These industries have an impact on the city's Gross Domestic Product (GDP), employment, and GDP since they employ at least 80% of the city's labor force and provide around 85% of the city's GDP.

Some of the major industries in the city include: Africa Asia Precious Stones & Mining Co. Ltd, Amboni Plantation Ltd, Anjari Soda Factory; Boston Industries Ltd, Burhan Salt Works Ltd, Coastal Oil Industries, El-Baraka Industries, Faeber Auto Parts Ltd Tanga Branch, General Electric Manufacturers Ltd, Gordon's Qualified Tailor & Outfitter, H.Y. Karimjee, Household Items & Hotel Accessories, Khanbhai Industries Ltd.

Kilimanjaro Cement Company, Kirani Industries Ltd, Kivindani Salt Works, Mamujee Products, Metal Industries Ltd, and Neelcanth Lime are additional significant businesses with headquarters in Tanga City. others are Pallet Manufacturers Ltd, Pembe Floor Mills, Polishes Manufacturers, Rhino Cement Company, Sandali Wood Industries Ltd, Silver General Distributor Co. Ltd, Star Salt Ltd, Tanga Cement Company Ltd and Tanga Fresh Ltd (Milk).

Tanga City Council has a small number of financial institution branches that serve the community. These include commercial banks such NMB, CRDB, NBC, TPB, TIB, Diamond Bank, mobile financial services like M-Pesa, Airtel Money, Tigo Pesa, T-Pesa, Z-Pesa, and others, SACCOS, and other Savings and Credit Schemes.

== Population ==
The district's original inhabitants were members of the Digo and Segeju communities, but subsequent urbanization has transformed Tanga City into one of Tanzania's most ethnically diverse cities. Some wards have ethnic majorities, for instance, Ngamiani Kaskazini ward is home to one of Tanzania's largest Indian communities.

342,880 people live in Tanga City Council as a whole. 165,188 (48.2%) are men and 177,692 (51.9%) are women. This is based on projections of 273,332 persons, of whom 123,019 women (52.1% of the population) and 130,920 men (47.9%) were counted in the 2012 Population and Housing Census.In Tanga City, there are 4.4 people per family, and the sex ratio is 93, meaning there are 93 men for every 100 women. An estimated 77,927 households are located within Tanga City Council.

Mabawa ward, which has 25,816 residents, is the most populous district in Tanga City, while Marungu has a smaller population of 3795. Children under the age of five (40,874) and seniors (64 and over) are anticipated to number 11135, while the working age group (those between the ages of 15 and 64) is estimated to number 229,999, or 67.1% of the total population.

== Education & Health ==
=== Education ===
As of February 2017, there were 124 Schools in Tanga district, 98 of are primary schools and 26 are secondary schools. The Open University of Tanzania, the Vocational Education of Tanzania Authority Tanga Centre (VETA), COTC, and the Tanga branch of the Public Service College are some of the tertiary education institutions hosted by the Tanga City Council.

==== Primary School ====
Every primary school is required to set up a pre-primary education class, per the 2014 National Education Policy. The City Council maintains 109 pre-primary courses, 81 of which are government-owned and 28 of which are privately owned. There are 7,092 students enrolled in these schools, 31,229 of them are boys and 30,280 of whom are girls. There are 100 competent teachers in the pre-primary level.

There are 109 elementary schools in the Tanga City Council, of which 28 are private and 81 are government primary schools. 56,183 students attend Government Primary Schools, 28,448 of whom are males and 27,735 of whom are girls. 9,943 students attend private elementary schools, 4,954 of whom are boys and 4,989 of whom are girls.10,754 students are enrolled in standard one, 4,713 of whom are males and 4,295 of whom are girls. Private schools enroll 898 boys and 848 girls.

==== Secondary School ====
With a total enrollment of 26,202 students (13,689 boys and 12,513 girls) throughout 44 secondary schools (26 public and 18 private), TangaCity Council has 44 secondary schools. There are 21,664 pupils enrolled in government schools, 11,718 of whom are male and 10,946 female. These 12 schools, which have a combined enrollment of 4,538 students and include 4 public schools, 8 private schools, and 1,971 males and 2,567 girls, respectively, offer advanced secondary education. Several important secondary education statistics include:- Additionally, out of 21,664 students enrolled in public schools, 19,990 (11,063 boys and 9,927 girls) are O-Level students, while 1,674 (1,655 boys and 19 girls) are A-Level students. Among the 4,538 students enrolled in private schools, 3432 (1,659 boys and 1,773 girls) are O-Level students, and 1,106 (312 boys and 794 girls) are A-Level students.

=== Health ===
There are 62 health facilities in the City Council, divided into 4 hospitals, 8 health centers, 46 dispensaries, and 5 clinics. 28 (61.6%) of these institutions are classified as being owned by the government, and 34 (38.4%) are classified as being privately held. With the exception of four facilities that require repair, the bulk of government health facilities are rated 2 to 3 stars and have acceptable infrastructure.

There are 562 healthcare professionals in the city, representing various health professions. Outside of the private sector, the council intends to hire 97 employees in 2020/2021, who will be assigned to various healthcare facilities. The distribution of healthcare professionals includes 8 medical doctors, 15 assistant medical officers, 3 health secretaries, 2 pharmacists, 2 laboratory scientists, 128 nurses, 46 assistant nursing officers, 32 assistant laboratory technologists, 85 clinical officers, 2 dental surgeons, 3 assistant dental officers, and 137 medical attendants. In Tanga City Council, the top ten causes of admission for patients older than five years old in 2020–21 were gynecological disorders (1,437; 23.39%), fractures (998; 16.25%), hypertension (713; 11.61%), HIV infections (622; 10.13%), and UTI (538; 8.76%). Traffic accidents made up 443 (7.21%), followed by diabetes (7.5%), anemia (6.02%), peptic ulcers (5.42%), and other febrile illnesses (4.17%) in that order.

== Notable People from Tanga City ==
- Shaaban bin Robert, National poet
- Ummy Mwalimu, Politician
- Bill Nass, Musician

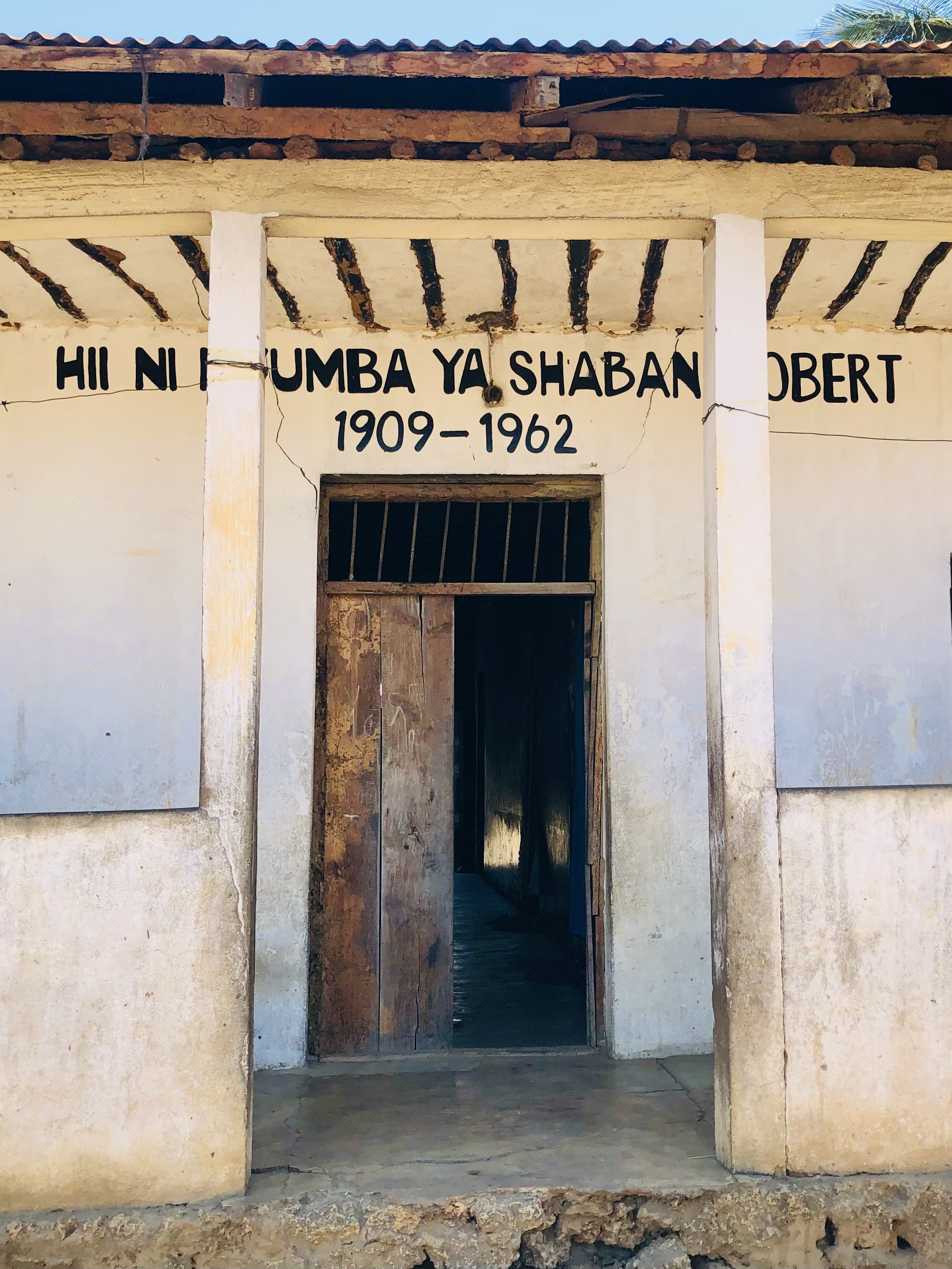
Tanzanian National Poet Shaaban Robert's historic home in Duga Ward, Tanga Mjini
