= Chumbageni =

Ward in Tanga Region, Tanzania

Chumbageni Kata ya Chumbageni (Swahili)
- Ward of Tanga City Council
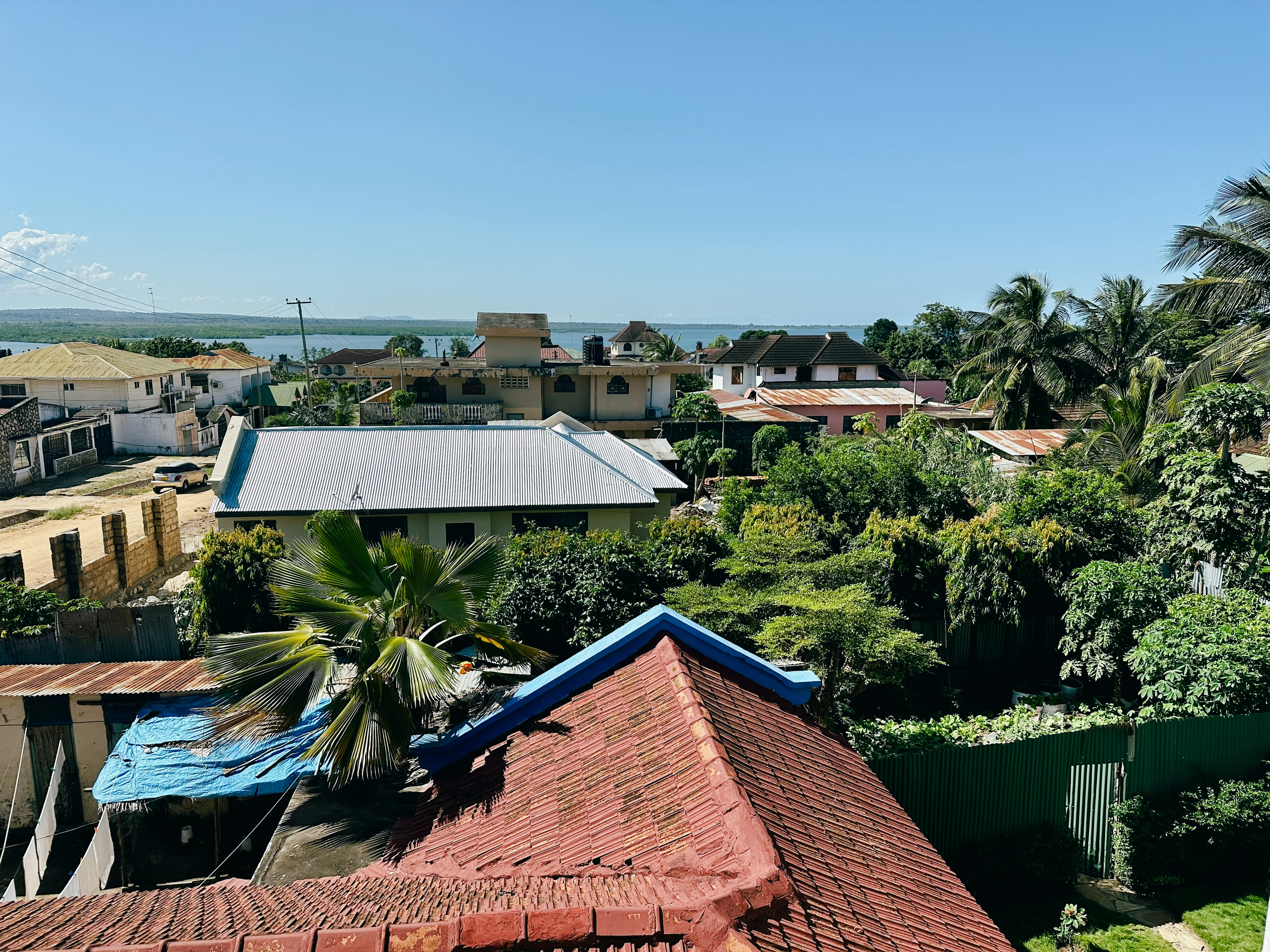
- From top to bottom: Scene in Chumbageni
- Interactive map of Chumbageni
- Coordinates: 5°4′19.2″S 39°5′26.16″E
- Country: Tanzania
- Region: Tanga Region
- District: Tanga City Council

Area
  - Total: 2.5 km^{2} (0.97 sq mi)

Population (2012)
  - Total: 14,225

Ethnic groups
  - Settler: Swahili
  - Ancestral: Digo & Segeju
- Tanzanian Postal Code: 21108

Chumbageni (Swahili: Kata ya Chumbageni) is an administrative ward in Tanga City Council of Tanga Region in Tanzania. Tanga Bay and Mzizima Ward, which are separated by the Mkulumuzi River and Tanga Bay, border the ward to the north. Central ward is to the east. Majengo, Mwanzange, and Nguvumali wards are to the south. Kiomoni ward is to the west. The ward covers an area of 2.5 km^{2} (0.97 sq mi), and has an average elevation of 23 m (75 ft). According to the 2012 census, the ward has a total population of 14,225.

== Administration ==
The postal code for Chumbageni Ward is 21108. The ward is divided into the following neighborhoods (Mitaa):

- Chumvini
- Ikulu
- Jofu juu A
- JUWATA
- Kisosora Kaskazini
- Kisosara Kusini
- Kotazi
- Kwaminchi
- Manzang'ombe
- Mtupie
- Roma
- Tumaini

=== Government ===
The ward, like every other ward in the country, has local government offices based on the population served. The Chumbageni Ward administration building houses a court as per the Ward Tribunal Act of 1988, including other vital departments for the administration the ward. The ward has the following administration offices:

- Chumbageni Police Station
- Chumbageni Government Office (Afisa Mtendaji)
- Chumbageni Tribunal (Baraza La Kata) is a Department inside Ward Government Office

In the local government system of Tanzania, the ward is the smallest democratic unit. Each ward is composed of a committee of eight elected council members which include a chairperson, one salaried officer (with no voting rights), and an executive officer. One-third of seats are reserved for women councillors.

== Demographics ==
Like much of the district, the ward is the ancestral home of the Digo people and Segeju.

== Education and health ==
=== Education ===
The ward is home to these educational institutions:

- Chumbageni Primary School
- Changa Primary School
- Kisosora Primary School
- Chumbageni Secondary School
- Mkuzi Secondary School
- Coastal Secondary School
- Macechu Secondary School

=== Healthcare ===
The ward is home to the following health institutions:

- Tumaini Health Center
