= Central, Tanga City Council =

Ward in Tanga City Council, Tanga Region

Central Kata ya Central (Swahili)
- Ward of Tanga City Council
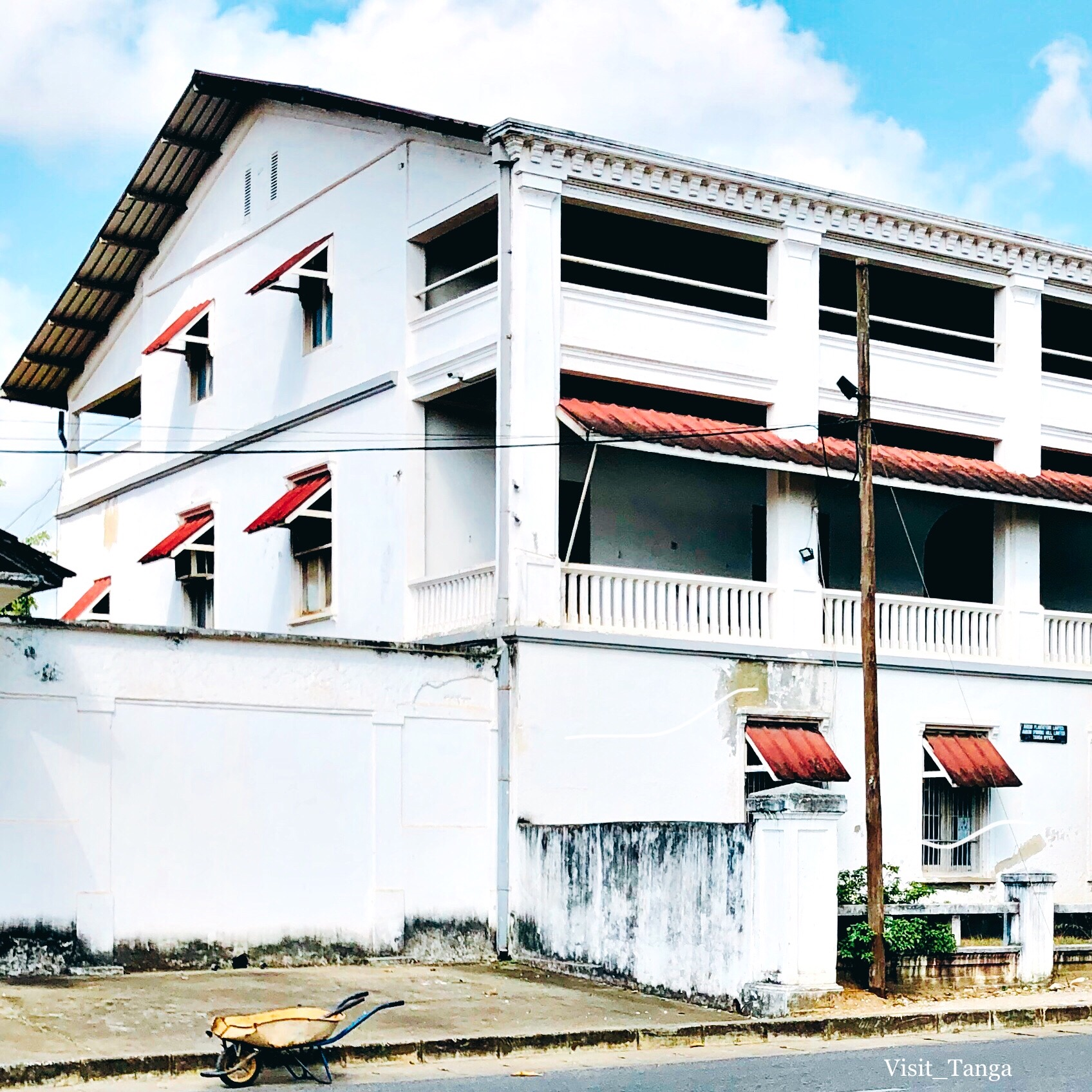
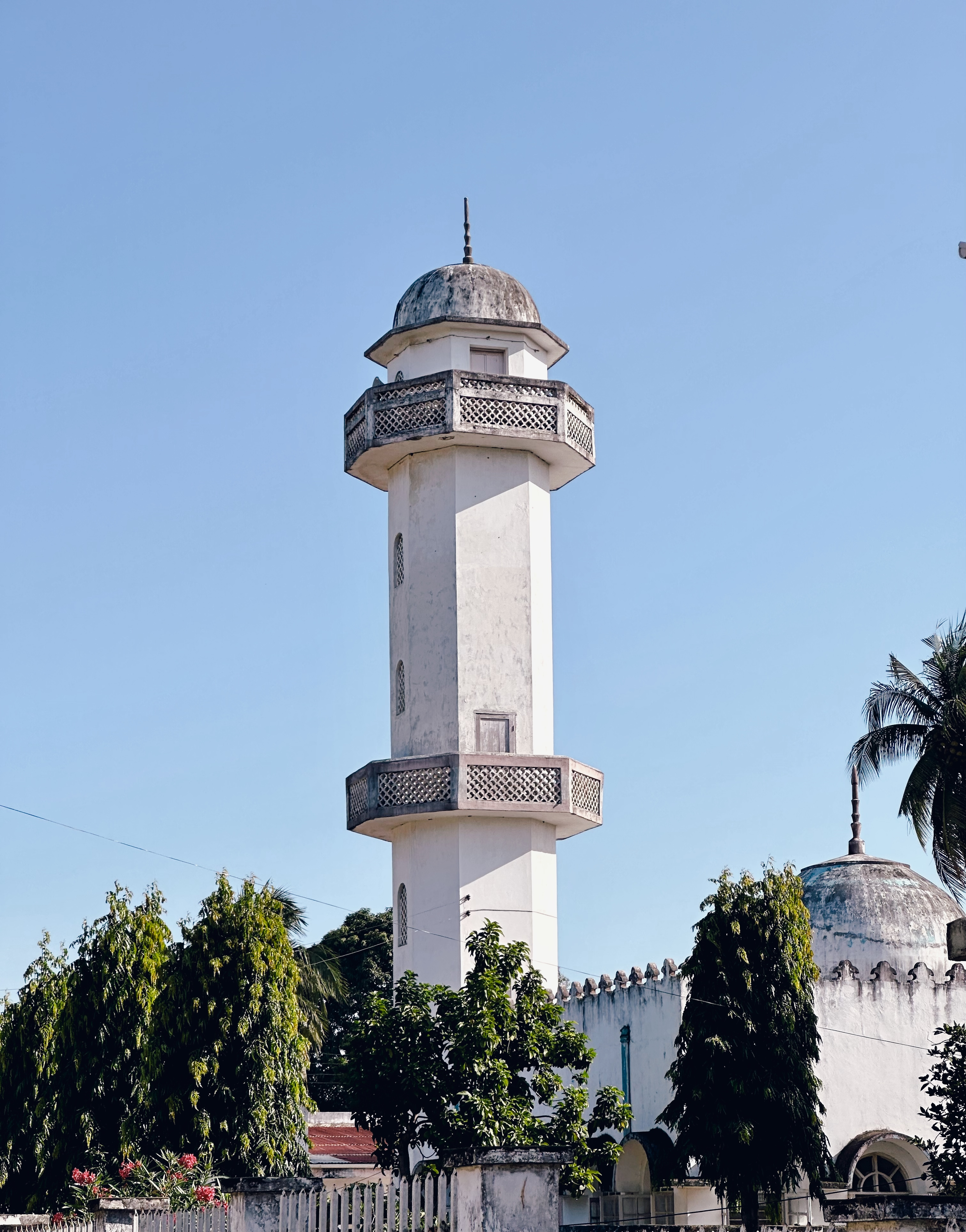
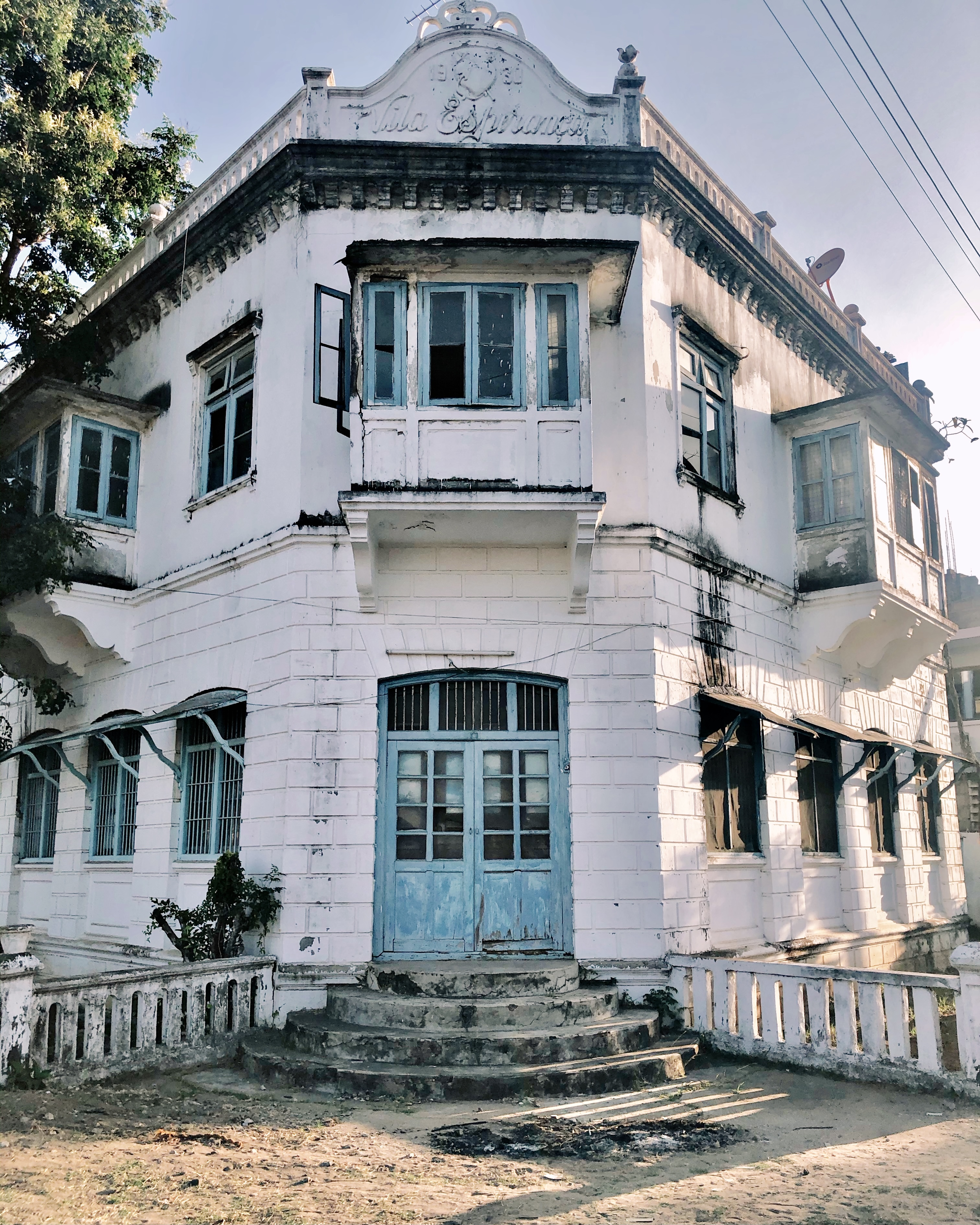
- From top to bottom: Colonial building in Central Ward, Masjid Ihsan of Central & Greek Colonial building in Central
- Interactive map of Central
- Coordinates: 5°4′20.64″S 39°5′47.4″E
- Country: Tanzania
- Region: Tanga Region
- District: Tanga District

Area
  - Total: 3.8 km^{2} (1.5 sq mi)
- Elevation: 10 m (33 ft)

Population (2012)
  - Total: 5,739

Ethnic groups
  - Settler: Swahili
  - Ancestral: Digo & Segeju
- Tanzanian Postal Code: 21101

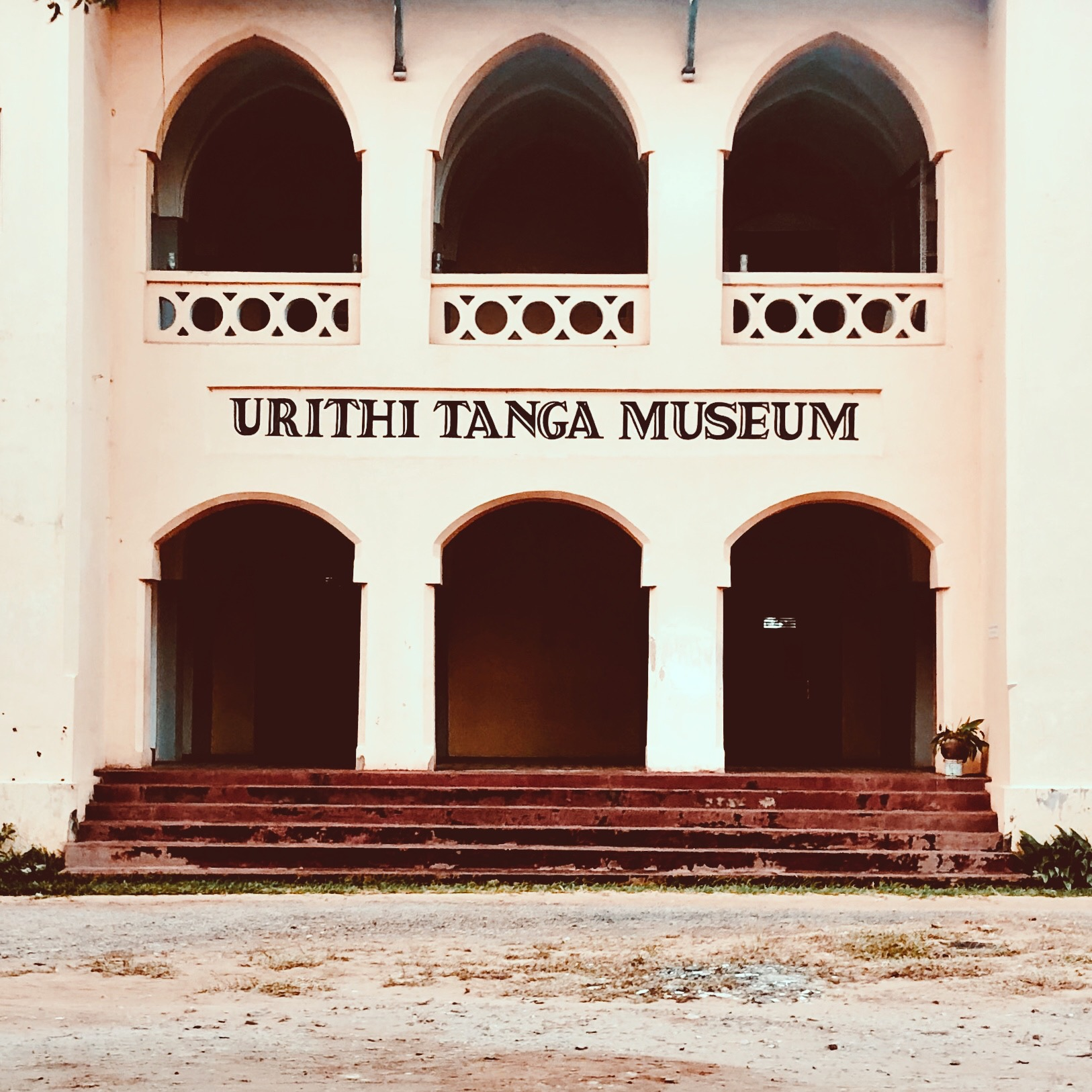
Museum building, Central Ward, Tanga

Central (Kata ya Central , in Swahili) is an administrative ward in Tanga City Council of Tanga Region in Tanzania. Tanga Bay borders the ward on its northern side. Pemba Channel lies to the east, and Mzingani, Usagara, Ngamiani Kaskazini, and Majengo ward are to the south. The Chumbageni ward is to the west. The ward covers an area of 3.8 km^{2} (1.5 sq mi), and has an average elevation of 10 m (33 ft). The ward seat is Halmashauri ya Jiji and is home to the Port of Tanga. According to the 2012 census, the ward has a total population of 5,739.

== Administration ==
The postal code for Central Ward is 21101. The ward is divided into the following neighborhoods (Mitaa):

- Amboni Road
- Bombo Area
- Central
- Darajani
- Halmashauri ya Jiji
- Miaka 21

- New Hotel
- Posta
- Railways
- Raskazone
- Sakarani

=== Government ===
The ward, like every other ward in the country, has local government offices based on the population served.The Central Ward administration building houses a court as per the Ward Tribunal Act of 1988, including other vital departments for the administration the ward. The ward has the following administration offices:

- Central Police Station
- Central Government Office (Afisa Mtendaji)
- Central Tribunal (Baraza La Kata) is a Department inside Ward Government Office

In the local government system of Tanzania, the ward is the smallest democratic unit. Each ward is composed of a committee of eight elected council members which include a chairperson, one salaried officer (with no voting rights), and an executive officer. One-third of seats are reserved for women councillors.

== Demographics ==
Like much of the district, the ward is the ancestral home of the Digo people and Segeju.

== Education and health ==
=== Education ===
The ward is home to these educational institutions:

- Burhani Primary School
- Kana Central Primary School
- Burhani Secondary School
- Popatlal Secondary School

=== Healthcare ===
The ward is home to the following health institutions:

- Siha polyclinic Health Center
- Tanga Medicare Hospital
- Bombo Regional Hospital
- Tumaini Health Center
