= Ngamiani Kusini =

Ward in Tanga City Council, Tanga Region

Ngamiani Kusini Kata ya Ngamiani Kusini (Swahili)
- Ward of Tanga City Council
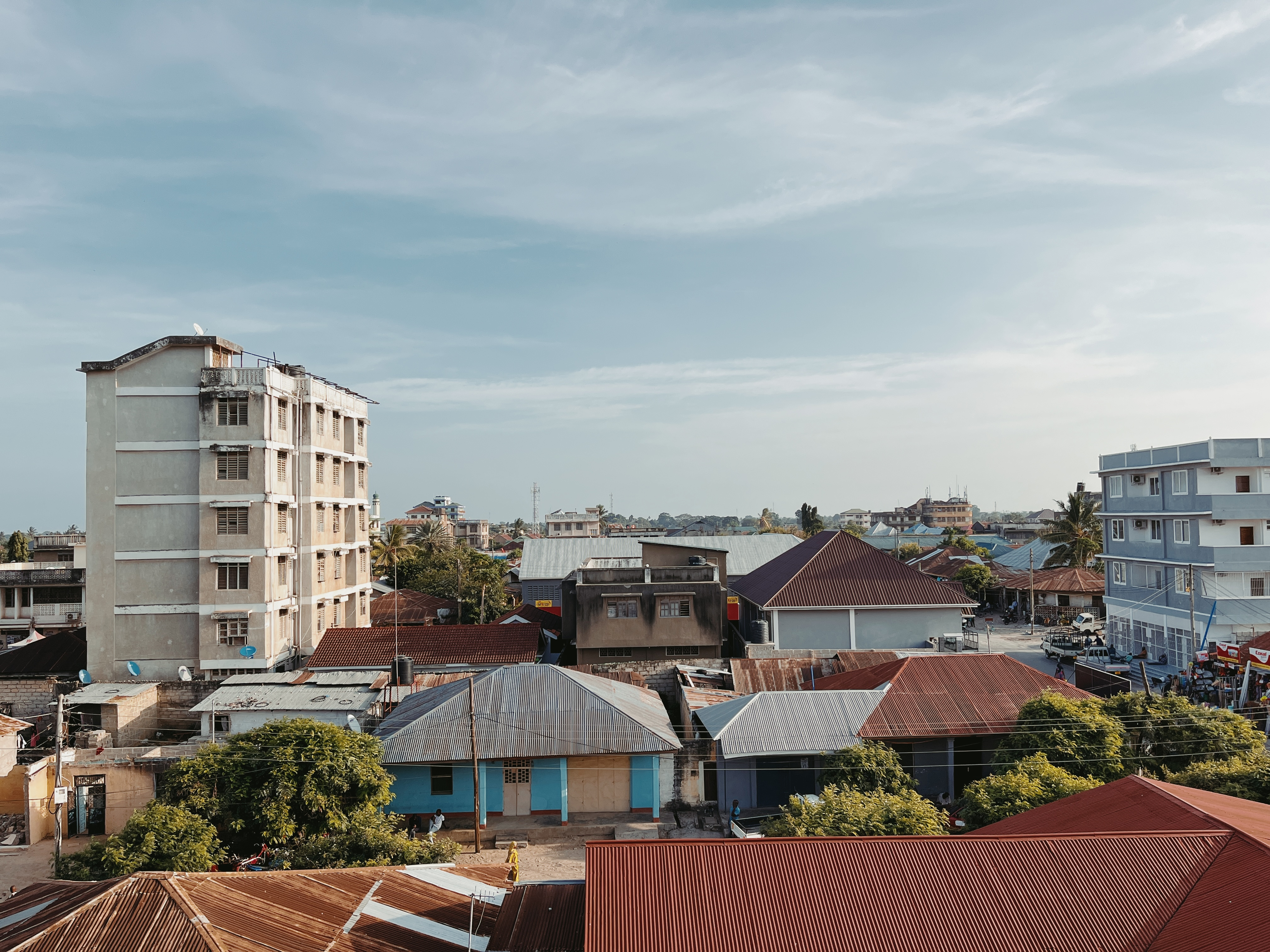
- From top to bottom: View of Ngaminai Kusini ward
- Interactive map of Ngamiani Kusini
- Coordinates: 5°4′59.88″S 39°6′6.12″E
- Country: Tanzania
- Region: Tanga Region
- District: Tanga City Council

Area
  - Total: 0.4 km^{2} (0.15 sq mi)

Population (2012)
  - Total: 7,638

Ethnic groups
  - Settler: Swahili
  - Ancestral: Digo & Segeju
- Tanzanian Postal Code: 21106

Ngamiani Kusini (Ngamiani Kusini, in Swahili) is an administrative ward in Tanga City Council of Tanga Region in Tanzania. Ngamiani Kati forms the northern boundary of the ward. Usagara and Makorora border the ward to the east. Msambweni is in the south. Majengo and Mwanzange are located to the west. The ward covers an area of 0.4 km^{2} (0.15 sq mi), and has an average elevation of 15 m (49 ft). According to the 2012 census, the ward has a total population of 7,638.

== Administration ==
The postal code for Ngamiani Kusini Ward is 21106. The ward is divided into the following neighborhoods (Mitaa):

- Azimio "A"
- Azimio "B"
- Jamhuri "A"
- Jamhuri "B"

- Mapinduzi "A"
- Mapinduzi "B"
- Muungano "A"
- Muungano "B"

=== Government ===
The ward, like every other ward in the country, has local government offices based on the population served.The Ngamiani Kusini Ward administration building houses a court as per the Ward Tribunal Act of 1988, including other vital departments for the administration the ward. The ward has the following administration offices:

- Ngamiani Kusini Police Station
- Ngamiani Kusini Government Office (Afisa Mtendaji)
- Ngamiani Kusini Tribunal (Baraza La Kata) is a Department inside Ward Government Office

In the local government system of Tanzania, the ward is the smallest democratic unit. Each ward is composed of a committee of eight elected council members which include a chairperson, one salaried officer (with no voting rights), and an executive officer. One-third of seats are reserved for women councillors.

== Demographics ==
Like much of the district, the ward is the ancestral home of the Digo people and Segeju.

== Education and health ==
=== Education ===
The ward is home to these educational institutions:

- Ngamiani Kusini Primary School
- Abdulhafidhi Abas Primary School

=== Healthcare ===
The ward is home to the following health institutions:

- Bethlehem Dental and Health Center of Ngamiani Kusini
