= Tangasisi =

Ward in Tanga City Council, Tanga Region

Tangasisi Kata ya Tangasisi (Swahili)
- Ward of Tanga City Council
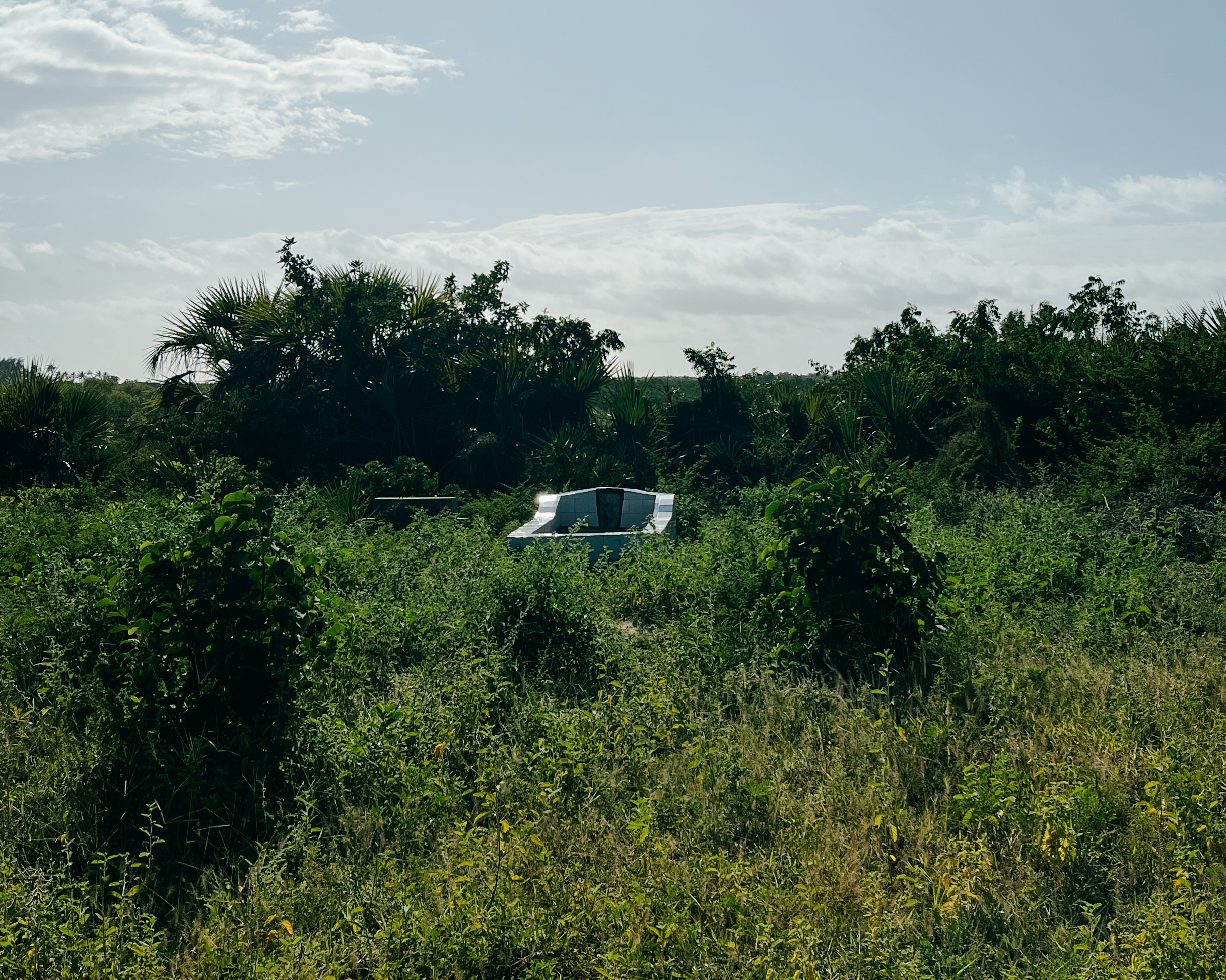
- From top to bottom: Shaaban Robert;s Grave in Tangasisi ward
- Interactive map of Tangasisi
- Coordinates: 5°7′42.96″S 39°5′17.16″E
- Country: Tanzania
- Region: Tanga Region
- District: Tanga City Council

Area
  - Total: 38.9 km^{2} (15.0 sq mi)

Population (2012)
  - Total: 19,149

Ethnic groups
  - Settler: Swahili
  - Ancestral: Digo & Segeju
- Tanzanian Postal Code: 21201

Tangasisi (Kata ya Tangasisi, in Swahili) is an administrative ward in Tanga City Council of Tanga Region in Tanzania. Mwanzange, Duga, Mabawa, and Mzingani form the ward's northern border. The Pemba Channel forms the eastern boundary of the ward. Tongoni is to the south. Maweni is to the west. The ward covers an area of 38.9 km^{2} (15.0 sq mi), and has an average elevation of 27 m (89 ft). According to the 2012 census, the ward has a total population of 19,149. The ward was the birthplace, home of national poet Shaaban bin Robert in Vibamba village and is also his final resting place at Machui village.

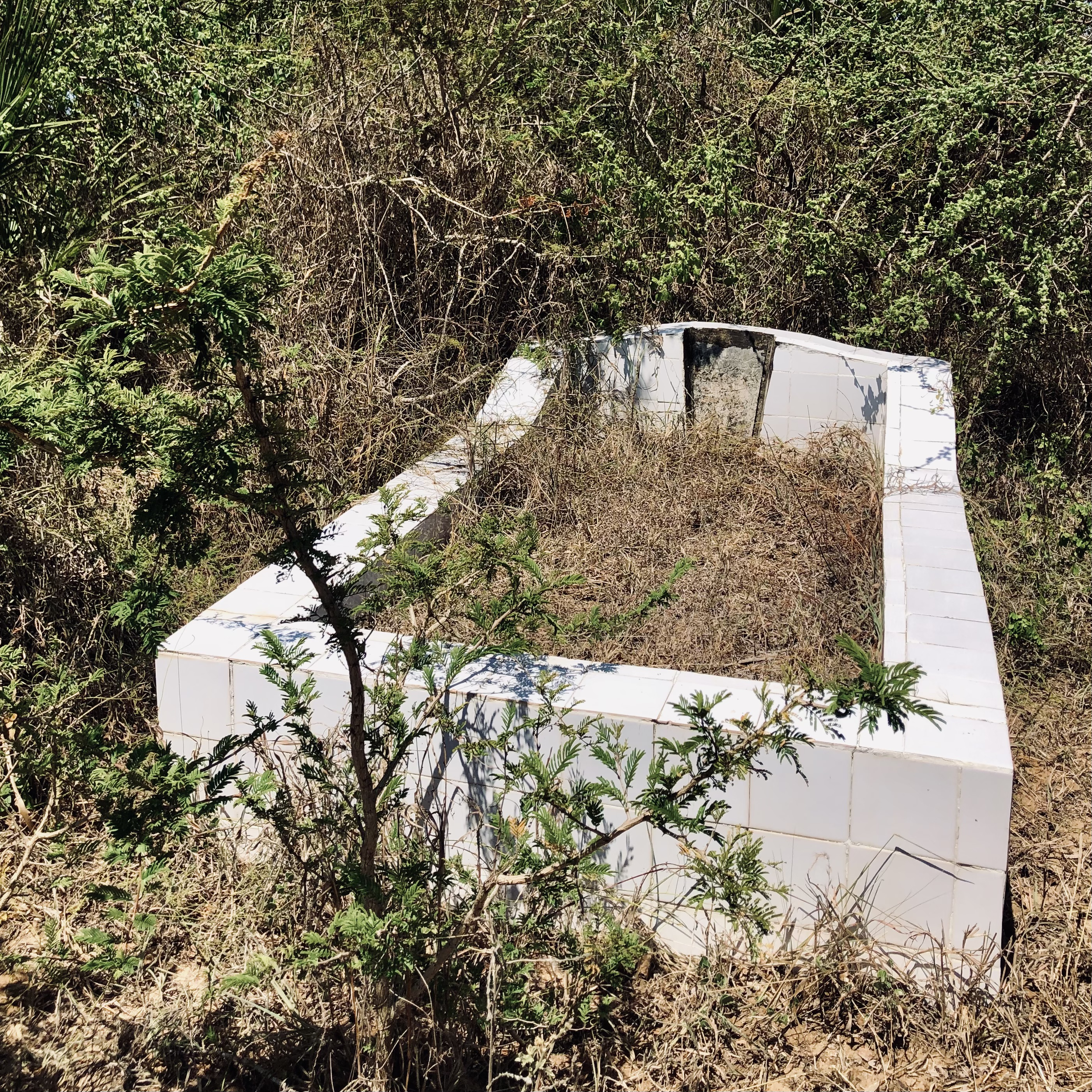
Shabaan Roberts Grave in Tangasisi Ward, Tanga

== Administration ==
The postal code for Tangasisi Ward is 21112. The ward is divided into the following neighborhoods (Mitaa):

- Bwagamoyo
- Chungurira
- Kivumbitifu
- Mchukuuni
- Mwakidila "A"

- Mwakidila "B"
- Mwambani
- Mwang'ombe Magharibi
- Mwang'ombe Mashariki
- Tangasisi

=== Government ===
The ward, like every other ward in the country, has local government offices based on the population served.The Tangasisi Ward administration building houses a court as per the Ward Tribunal Act of 1988, including other vital departments for the administration the ward. The ward has the following administration offices:

- Tangasisi Police Station
- Tangasisi Government Office (Afisa Mtendaji)
- Tangasisi Tribunal (Baraza La Kata) is a Department inside Ward Government Office

In the local government system of Tanzania, the ward is the smallest democratic unit. Each ward is composed of a committee of eight elected council members which include a chairperson, one salaried officer (with no voting rights), and an executive officer. One-third of seats are reserved for women councillors.

== Demographics ==
Like much of the district, the ward is the ancestral home of the Digo people and Segeju.

== Education and health ==
=== Education ===
The ward is home to these educational institutions:

- Machui Primary School
- Mwambani Primary School
- Mwakidila Primary School
- Mwapachu Secondary School
- Mwang'ombe Primary School

=== Healthcare ===
The ward is home to the following health institutions:

- Machui Health Center
- Mwadikila Health Center
