= Duga, Tanga City Council =

Ward in Tanga City Council, Tanga Region

Duga Kata ya Duga (Swahili)
- Ward of Tanga City Council
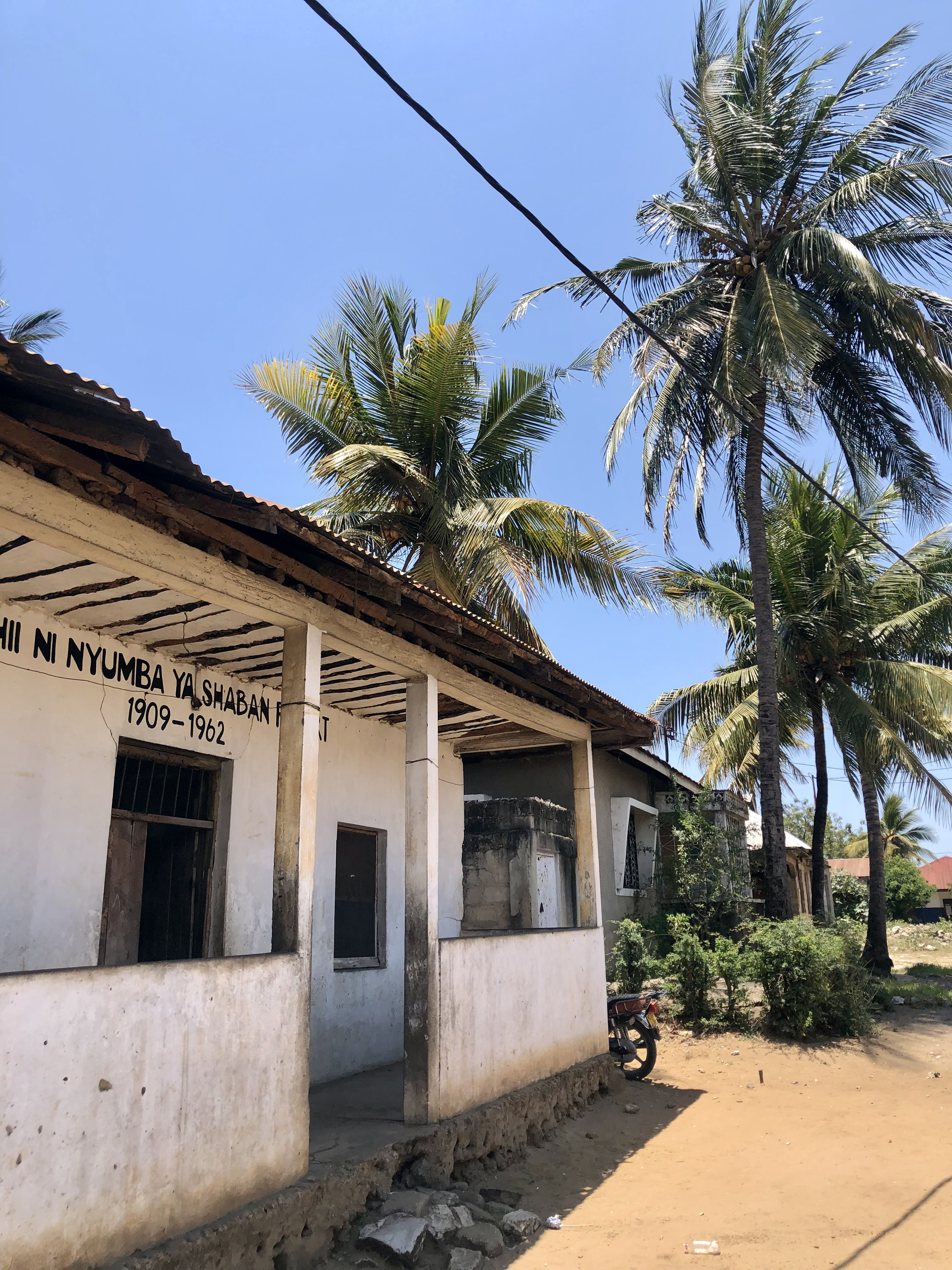
- From top to bottom: Shaaban Robert historic house in Duga ward
- Interactive map of Duga
- Coordinates: 5°6′30.24″S 39°5′0.24″E
- Country: Tanzania
- Region: Tanga Region
- District: Tanga City Council

Area
  - Total: 2.4 km^{2} (0.93 sq mi)

Population (2012)
  - Total: 18,704

Ethnic groups
  - Settler: Swahili
  - Ancestral: Digo & Segeju
- Tanzanian Postal Code: 21114

Duga (Kata ya Duga , in Swahili) is an administrative ward in Tanga City Council of Tanga Region in Tanzania. Mwanzange ward encircles the ward on both the north and west sides. Mabawa is to its east. Tangasisi ward is to the south. The ward covers an area of 2.4 km^{2} (0.93 sq mi), and has an average elevation of 25 m (82 ft). The late Shaaban Robert, the national poet had a home in Duga ward and its the wards largest attraction. According to the 2012 census, the ward has a total population of 18,704.

== Administration ==
The postal code for Duga Ward is 21114. The ward is divided into the following neighborhoods (Mitaa):

- Duga Barabarani
- Duga Dampo
- Duga Mpya
- Duga Viwanjani
- Jaje
- Magomeni "A"
- Magomeni "B"

- Magomeni "C"
- Majengo "A"
- Majengo "B"
- Majengo "C"
- Mapinduzi
- Mji Mwwema
- Mwakizaro "B"

=== Government ===
The ward, like every other ward in the country, has local government offices based on the population served.The Duga Ward administration building houses a court as per the Ward Tribunal Act of 1988, including other vital departments for the administration the ward. The ward has the following administration offices:

- Duga Police Station
- Duga Government Office (Afisa Mtendaji)
- Duga Tribunal (Baraza La Kata) is a Department inside Ward Government Office

In the local government system of Tanzania, the ward is the smallest democratic unit. Each ward is composed of a committee of eight elected council members which include a chairperson, one salaried officer (with no voting rights), and an executive officer. One-third of seats are reserved for women councillors.

== Demographics ==
Like much of the district, the ward is the ancestral home of the Digo people and Segeju.

== Education and health ==
=== Education ===
The ward is home to these educational institutions:

- Shabaan Robert Primary School

=== Healthcare ===
The ward is home to the following health institutions:

- Duga Health Center
