= Mwanzange =

Ward in Tanga City Council, Tanga Region

Mwanzange Kata ya Mwanzange (Swahili)
- Ward of Tanga City Council
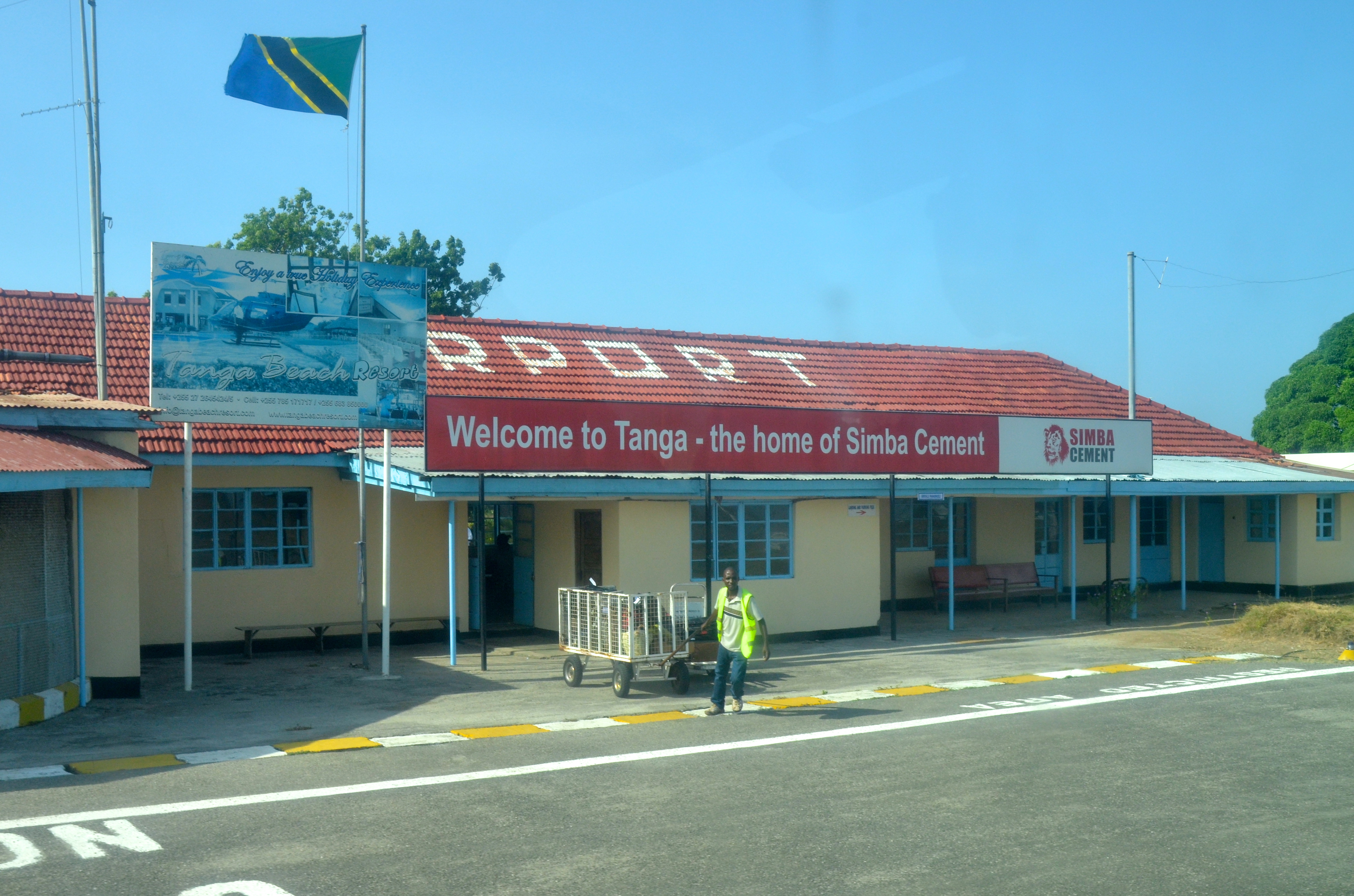
- From top to bottom: Tanga Airport located in Mwanzange ward
- Nickname: Tanga's airport
- Interactive map of Mwanzange
- Coordinates: 5°5′39.84″S 39°4′36.84″E
- Country: Tanzania
- Region: Tanga Region
- District: Tanga City Council

Area
  - Total: 7.6 km^{2} (2.9 sq mi)

Population (2012)
  - Total: 7,521

Ethnic groups
  - Settler: Swahili
  - Ancestral: Digo & Segeju
- Tanzanian Postal Code: 21113

Mwanzange (Kata ya Mwanzange , in Swahili) is an administrative ward in Tanga City Council of Tanga Region in Tanzania. The ward's northern boundaries are formed by Nguvumali and Chumbageni. Majengo and Msambweni border the ward on its eastern side. Duga ward and Tangasisi are to the south. Maweni is in the west. Tanga Airport is located entirely within Mwanzage's borders. The ward covers an area of 7.6 km^{2} (2.9 sq mi), and has an average elevation of 21 m (69 ft). According to the 2012 census, the ward has a total population of 7,521.

== Administration ==
The postal code for Mwanzange Ward is 21113. The ward is divided into the following neighborhoods (Mitaa):

- Maguzoni
- Majengo

- Mwakizara
- Mwanzange

=== Government ===
The ward, like every other ward in the country, has local government offices based on the population served.The Mwanzange Ward administration building houses a court as per the Ward Tribunal Act of 1988, including other vital departments for the administration the ward. The ward has the following administration offices:

- Mwanzange Police Station
- Mwanzange Government Office (Afisa Mtendaji)
- Mwanzange Tribunal (Baraza La Kata) is a Department inside Ward Government Office

In the local government system of Tanzania, the ward is the smallest democratic unit. Each ward is composed of a committee of eight elected council members which include a chairperson, one salaried officer (with no voting rights), and an executive officer. One-third of seats are reserved for women councillors.

== Demographics ==
Like much of the district, the ward is the ancestral home of the Digo people and Segeju.

== Education and health ==
=== Education ===
The ward is home to these educational institutions:

- Mwanzange Primary School
- Toledo Secondary School

=== Healthcare ===
The ward is home to the following health institutions:

- Mwanzange Health Center
