= Mwewe Island =

Protected island and marine reserve in Tanga Region of Tanzania

- IUCN category II (national park)
- Location within Tanzania
- Location: Tanzania, Tanga Region, Mkinga District
- Nearest city: Tanga
- Coordinates: 4°46′57″S 39°10′47″E
- Length: 1.0 km (0.62 mi)
- Width: 0.2 km (0.12 mi)
- Established: 2010
- Governing body: Marine Parks & Reserves Authority (Tanzania)
- Website: Tanga Marine Reserves System

Mwewe Island officially, Mwewe Island Marine Reserve (Kisiwa cha Hifadhi Akiba cha Mwewe, in Swahili) is a protected, uninhabited island in the Pemba Channel under the Tanga Marine Reserves (TMRS) with the IUCN category II located within Mkinga District of Tanga Region in Tanzania. According to oral Digo history, the island was used by some Kirui Island residents, Mwewe Island was eventually purchased by Sultan Bin Athmani of Moa.

== Geography and ecology ==
The primary biotope in the Mwewe Island marine reserve is mangrove vegetation. In the island's centre, 6.4 Ha worth of land is covered in vegetation. The island is home to numerous animal and plant populations (not studied). On the west (towards the stream) and on the north, towards Moa, healthier mangrove stands can be seen. Sand buildup in the east has put a strain on the mangroves. The majority of mangrove species were discovered, with Rhizophora mucronata and Sonneratia alba predominating. Pemphis acidula, a rare mangrove species, was widespread in the higher intertidal zone behind other mangrove species, particularly on the island's southern side.

On the east and southwest, in the direction of the mainland mangroves, the intertidal zone is considerably less widespread. Digo Fishermen can reach Mwewe Island on foot from communities on the mainland in Moa and Boma wards at spring low tides, just like other islands (Ulenge and Kwale Islands) are. On the southwest side, near streams and mainland mangroves, the intertidal is a mixture of mud and sand; on the seaward side, it is sandy. Algal mats were not observed, and there are no rocky intertidal zones.

South of Mwewe Island, there are comparatively less seagrass beds because of the heavy muck on the bottom, strong resuspension, and consequent turbidity. In this area of the Bay, snorkelling revealed a substrate mix of muddy sand that was frequently excavated by critters that burrow, giving the bottom a rough texture and small hills. Seagrass patches and isolated coral patches, largely made up of Porites bomies and a few Acropora and Stylophora species resistant to sediment stress, were visible on the channel. The quantity of the upside-down jellyfish Cassiopea Andromeda are abundant on Mwewe.
