= Tanga Marine Reserves =

Group of marine wildlife reserves in Tanzania

- (TMRS)
- Location within Tanzania
- Location: Tanzania, Tanga Region, Mkinga District; Tanga District; Pangani District
- Nearest city: Tanga
- Coordinates: 5°01′54″S 39°11′40″E
- Area: 552 km^{2} (213 sq mi)
- Established: 2010
- Governing body: Marine Parks & Reserves Authority (Tanzania)
- Website: Tanga Marine Reserves

The Tanga Marine Reserves System (TMRS) (Hifahdi Akiba za Bahari ya Tanga, in Swahili) is a group of marine reserves in the Tanga Region of Tanzania. All TMRs, though, serve as significant sea bird breeding areas. The Tanga Marine Reserves are: Kirui Island, Maziwe Island, Ulenge Island, Kwale Island and Mwewe Island.

== Geography ==
Every marine reserve has a corresponding bay, such as Tanga Bay and Kwale Bay for the Ulenge MR and Kwale Bay and Manza Bay for the Kwale MR. Moa Bay contains the town of Mwewe. Just to the north of Moa Bay is Kirui MR. The predominant characteristic of the bays and nearby shallow seas of the TMRs was seagrass beds. Turbidity, silt, and freshwater input from rivers appear to frequently alter the health of sea grasses in the Bays. Seagrass beds are more numerous and abound near Moa Bay and to the east of Kirui Island. Compared to Kwale Bay, where sediment mobility has a detrimental effect on seagrass growth, Manza Bay has more seagrass communities.

The Tanga Marine reserves have every species of mangrove found in Tanzania. Rhizophora mucronata predominated in wave-protected locations, while Sonneratia alba was the main tree seaward. There are no sandy beaches that are appropriate for tourists, and there are no known sea turtle breeding grounds in the TMRs.

== Coral Reefs ==
Because of sedimentation, freshwater input, and an inadequate substrate for coral settlement, coral growth in the Bays is severely constrained. Kwale and Manza Bays included only a few, sporadic coral reef sections. Coral patches were discovered in Moa Bay's deeper area. On the seaward side of the Ulenge, Kwale, and Kirui Islands, continuous coral reefs were present. Kirui (26.728%, 37 coral genera) had the highest average coral cover and species richness, followed by Kwale (109.5%, 29 coral genera). Ulenge reefs had the lowest coral cover and species richness (5–7%, 16 coral genera).

== Fish stocks ==
According to a visual fish census, it was revealed that the eastern side of Kirui Island's reefs had relatively more fish stocks than the Kwale and Ulenge reefs, which had the lowest fish densities. In line with this, the catch for each unit of effort was higher in Jasini and Moa than in the area of Kwale and Ulenge Islands. According to interviews about trends in catch per unit effort, demersal (seagrass and coral reef) stocks are being overfished, but catch rates for pelagic stocks, like dagaa and mackerels, have not changed significantly.

=== Threats ===
The primary threats to fish stocks are the ongoing habitat destruction brought on by the use of dynamite and dragnets (beach seine and similar nets), as well as the overfishing of keystone species as a result of an increase in the population of fishers and collectors (driven by demand) who are allowed free entry into and around TMRs. This investigation made it very evident that the majority of fishing occurs outside of the Bays, on coral reefs, seagrass beds, and/or nearby deep waters. Where there is a combination of or interactions between mangroves, coral reefs, and seagrass beds, fish aggregations happen. Mangrove crabs, prawns, octopus, lobsters, clams, sea cucumbers, and shelled mollusks are a few of the edible invertebrates that can be found in TMRs.

== Coelacanth and dugongs ==
Dugong sightings were reported in the Mbayae-Kigomeni area in 1994 and 2004, which is just east of Kirui Island and south of the Kenyan border. Less than 10 kilometres separate Ulenge Island Marine Reserve from Tanga Coelacanth Marine Park, where coelacanth (Latimeria chalumnae) are found and frequently caught in deep water. One possible special habitat is the shallow sea area that stretches from the south Kenyan coast eastward to Kirui Island and Moa Bay. Fish productivity is enhanced by the intricate interplay of mangrove impacts, large seagrass beds, and coral reefs in this zone. It is in this region that dugongs are supposedly thought to live in addition to being a significant fishing spot for fishermen in Kenya and Tanzania.

== History ==
The Maziwe Island Marine Reserve, established in 1975, was Tanga's first MPA. The General Management Plan for this reserve is still being created for a number of reasons. The Tanga Coastal Zone Conservation and Development Programme (TCZCDP), which was started in July 1994 and ran until June 2007, helped Tanga coastal regions, including Maziwe Island Marine Reserve, to understand and apply the fundamentals of ICAM.

Marine biologists and management were disturbed by rising Coelacanth catch rates along the Tanga coast between 2002 and 2009. A study using remotely operated underwater vehicles (ROVs) discovered that there are coelacanth populations in the Kigombe-Mwarongo region. The Tanga Coelacanth Marine Park (TaCMP), which also replaced the defunct CMPs, was established to protect coelacanth and promote sustainable use in the region. As part of the TaCMP GPM, a zoning plan was created to permit controlled use of core zones and designated use zones within the TaCMP.

All interested parties were included in the TaCMP GMP development at every stage, and high compliance is anticipated when the regulations are put into effect.The MPRU recognised four Islands (Ulenge, Kwale, Mwewe, and Kirui) north of Tanga Bay near the Tanzania–Kenya boundary as appropriate marine reserves in 2010 after consulting with local authorities. If appropriate management methods are used in these Islands, the entire northern coastal zone will benefit (spillover effects).

== Cultural history ==
According to oral history, The Swahili people from the North, led by Chief Mwinyi Ulenge, were the original inhabitants of Ulenge Island. They were compelled to travel to the mainland due to a water deficit on the island. The majority of them relocated to what is now known as Chongoleani. The Wadigo tribe, who lived by the beaches on Kwale Island, once called it home. The Wadigo from Mwandusi village fled and eventually lived in Kwale Island because they were protected there because Masai soldiers frequently attacked them there. However, due to a scarcity of fresh water and growing family sizes, they were compelled to return to the mainland. The majority reside in Kwale village. This island served as a stronghold throughout the First and Second World Wars.

The majority of the Wadigo have since moved from Kirui Island to the villages of Kijiru and Ndumbani in Moa Ward in Mkinga District. Two settlement regions were established on the island: Kirui in the south and Kendwa and Mbayai in the north. More than 20 households lived on Kirui Island. They started to flee in the early 1960s as a result of an upsurge in mortality that was thought to be caused by some form of devils. Some people moved to Kiphururwe en route to the Jasini region, while others travelled to Kijiru and Ndumbani. They keep going to Kirui and Mbayai to pay respect to their forefathers. As a result, all of the TMRs are currently essentially empty. inhabitants from two wards, Mayomboni and Moa, use the islands of Mwewe and Kirui, while inhabitants from the 8,226-person Kwale and Mtimbwani wards use the islands of Ulenge and Kwale the most.
