= Kwale Island =

Protected island and marine reserve in Tanga Region of Tanzania

- IUCN category II (national park)
- Location within Tanzania
- Location: Tanzania, Tanga Region, Mkinga District, Kwale ward
- Nearest city: Tanga
- Coordinates: 4°58′12″S 39°9′36″E
- Length: 4.4 km (2.7 mi)
- Width: 3.4 km (2.1 mi)
- Established: 2010
- Governing body: Marine Parks & Reserves Authority (Tanzania)
- Website: Tanga Coelacanth Marine Park

Kwale Island (Kisiwa cha Kwale, in Swahili) is a protected, seasonally inhabited island in the Pemba Channel under the Tanga Marine Reserves (TMRS) with the IUCN category II located inside Kwale ward in Mkinga District of Tanga Region in Tanzania. The coral island, located approximately a kilometer offshore in Manza Bay, and the modern hamlet on the shoreline are both referred to as Kwale. 86.2% of Kwale Island, or 528.1 Ha, is covered with mangroves. Kwale Island and Ulenge Island are the only seasonally inhabited by islands in the marine reserve, thus the two have the most human impact. The Island has an average elevation of 7 m (23 ft).

== Geography and ecology ==
The Kwale Marine Reserve's dominant biotope is mangrove vegetation. Mangroves are more closely packed towards the west and south coasts, where they face the mainland and Kwale Bay, where the bottom is made up of fine, muddy sediments, than along the seashore, where the bottom is more rocky with only a thin layer of material. Despite the presence of all mangrove species, species with robust root systems, such as Rhizophora mucronata and Sonneratia alba, predominate. Similar to Ulenge, Kwale Islands mangroves are susceptible to very regular tidal water movement that tends to wash across the mangrove. Depending on the strength and direction of the ocean currents, sediment buildup is fairly weak and seasonal. Numerous animal and plant populations exist there, albeit they have not been studied.

The important bird area, IBM 35, as designated by Birdlife International, includes the Ulenge and Kwale Island Marine Reserves. This bird region is home to a variety of different bird species, such as the Greater Sand Plover, Curlew Sandpiper, Crab Plover, and migrating waders. Coral reefs and mangroves are not specifically in risk of extinction, but they are under threat from human activity and causes related to climate change.

== History ==
On Kwale Island, the Wadigo community once resided close to the beaches. In the 19th Century Masai frequently attacked the Wadigo from Mwandusi village, so they fled and eventually settled permanently in Kwale Island interior where they were safe from attack. However, they were eventually forced to go back to the mainland due to a lack of fresh water and expanding family sizes. The majority of Digo call Kwale village home. Throughout the First and Second World Wars, this island functioned as a stronghold for colonial forces.

== Historical site ==
Today, a dense vegetation of trees, including large baobabs, mangroves, and dense thorn bushes completely covers the island. Since there is no legal protection, people are chopping down the forests for fire wood. Additionally, the island has produced some Swahili ware pottery fragments from the Middle Ages, indicating that it once belonged to the Swahili states. The island has historically been deserted since.
