= Manza, Mkinga =

Ward of Mkinga District, Tanga Region

Manza Kata ya Manza (Swahili)
- Ward of Mkinga District
- From top to bottom
- Location within Tanzania
- Coordinates: 4°50′25.08″S 39°8′17.52″E
- Country: Tanzania
- Region: Tanga Region
- District: Mkinga District

Area
  - Total: 37.6 km^{2} (14.5 sq mi)

Population (2012)
  - Total: 3,613

Ethnic groups
  - Settler: Swahili
  - Ancestral: Digo & Segeju
- Tanzanian Postal Code: 21513

Manza (Kata ya Manza, in Swahili) is an administrative ward of the Mkinga District in the Tanga Region of Tanzania. Moa ward borders the ward on the northern side. to the south by Kwale, Mtimbwani, and Doda, and to the east by Boma Ward across Manza Bay. Parungu Kasera and Mkinga Wards are to the west. The ward is named after Manza Bay. According to the 2012 Census the ward had a population of 3,613.

== Administration ==
The postal code for Manza Ward is 21513. The ward is divided into the following neighborhoods (Mitaa):

- Jitenge
- Kasemeni
- Kikwajuni
- Kwasongoro
- Manza
- Mbuyuni
- Mtakuja
- Mtundani

- Mvumoni
- Mwadudu
- Mwakoro
- Mwandusi
- Mzizima
- Sigaya
- Tawalani
- Vibambani

=== Government ===
The ward, like every other ward in the country, has local government offices based on the population served.The Manza Ward administration building houses a court as per the Ward Tribunal Act of 1988, including other vital departments for the administration the ward. The ward has the following administration offices:

- Manza Police Station
- Manza Government Office (Afisa Mtendaji)
- Manza Tribunal (Baraza La Kata) is a Department inside Ward Government Office

In the local government system of Tanzania, the ward is the smallest democratic unit. Each ward is composed of a committee of eight elected council members which include a chairperson, one salaried officer (with no voting rights), and an executive officer. One-third of seats are reserved for women councillors.

== Demographics ==
Like much of the district, the ward is the ancestral home of the Digo people and Segeju.

== Education and health ==
=== Education ===
The ward is home to these educational institutions:

- Manza Primary School
- Manza Secondary School
- Manza Bay secondary School

=== Healthcare ===
The ward is home to the following health institutions:

- Manza Health Center
- Mwandusi Health Center
