= Kirui Island =

Protected island and marine reserve in Tanga Region of Tanzania

- IUCN category II (national park)
- Location within Tanzania
- Location: Tanzania, Tanga Region, Mkinga District
- Nearest city: Tanga
- Coordinates: 4°58′12″S 39°9′36″E
- Length: 4.4 km (2.7 mi)
- Width: 3.4 km (2.1 mi)
- Established: 2010
- Governing body: Marine Parks & Reserves Authority (Tanzania)
- Website: Tanga Coelacanth Marine Park

Kirui Island officially, Kirui Island Marine Reserve (Kisiwa cha Hifadhi Akiba cha Kirui, in Swahili) is a protected, uninhabited island in the Pemba Channel under the Tanga Marine Reserves (TMRS) with the IUCN category II located within Mkinga District of Tanga Region in Tanzania. The Island is the largest in Tanga and one of the largest protected marine Islands in Tanzania Mangroves are thought to cover 680 ha (ha) of the island of Kirui, with the largest mangrove area (557 ha) being on the north and west sides, Kigomeni mangrove (60 ha) being on the east coast, and Kirui South Mangrove (63 ha) being on the south.

== Overview ==
Northeast of Kirui Island, in the subtidal zone, are sea grass beds. Additionally, the area east of Moa Bay and Kirui Island can be regarded as a unique environment. Fish productivity is enhanced by the intricate interplay of mangrove impacts,and coral reefs in this zone. In the Mbayae-Kigomeni area, to the east of Kirui Island, where they were spotted in 1994 and 2004, a small population of dugongs.

== Geography ==
In addition to mangroves that encircle the south, west, and north sides, Kirui Island Marine Reserve is the largest and features a sizable percentage of real land vegetation. There are numerous land animal and plant communities that exist and that merit scholarly attention (beyond the purview of this study). Mangrove stands facing the west and north appeared to be in better shape than those facing Moa Bay's south. All of Tanzania's mangrove species are present, but Rhizophora, Avicenia, and Cyriops are the most common. Mangroves in Kirui don't resemble those on the mainland since they aren't constantly being washed through by tidal currents like those on Ulenge and Kwale Islands are. They are more varied and contain sediment deposits that are often thicker.

Except for a little section in the middle where mangroves are abundant, the island's eastern coastline is stony. While the intertidal zone on the south of Kirui Island, the side facing Moa Bay, is generally more vast and mostly stony, it is somewhat more narrow on the north and west, near the creek dividing Kirui and mainland mangrove. Near the southeast tip of the island, a thin layer of mangrove grows on a substrate that is virtually rock. The intertidal zone of Kirui Island's east shore is mostly narrow and rocky, but it widens to 600 m in the middle. Local women traditionally visit the famous octopus harvesting spot in the lower intertidal of the extended zone during spring low tides.

The northeast also has a large intertidal zone, primarily because of the creek's (river flow) influence, which artificially creates a Bay that extends southward. The top intertidal zone in the northeast zone is rocky, whilst the lower intertidal and subtidal zones are sandy and have a lot of seagrass growth. With the exception of the northeastern point, where river or creak water and sediments inhibit coral settlement and growth, Kirui Island's eastern side is completely covered in coral reefs. In general, seagrass beds rule Moa Bay, with a patchy coral reef in the middle of the bay, where it is deeper. At Ras Gomani, a location outside the borders of the Kirua Island Marne Reserve, excellent coral reefs were seen.

== History ==
Wadigo originally lived on Kirui Island, but most of them have now relocated to Kijiru and Ndumbani villages in Moa Ward of Mkinga District. The Island was divided into two settlement areas: Kirui in the south and Kendwa and Mbayai in the north. Kirui Island was home to more than 20 families. Due to an increase in fatalities that was believed to be related to some sort of devils, they began to leave in the early 1960s. On their route to the Jasini area, some migrated to Kiphururwe, while others went to Kijiru and Ndumbani. They continue to travel to Kirui and Mbayai to honour their ancestors.
