= Boma, Mkinga =

Ward of Mkinga District, Tanga Region

Boma Kata ya Boma (Swahili)
- Ward of Mkinga District
- From top to bottom
- Location within Tanzania
- Coordinates: 4°52′41.4″S 39°12′2.52″E
- Country: Tanzania
- Region: Tanga Region
- District: Mkinga District

Area
  - Total: 42.1 km^{2} (16.3 sq mi)

Population (2012)
  - Total: 2,587

Ethnic groups
  - Settler: Swahili
  - Ancestral: Digo & Segeju
- Tanzanian Postal Code: 21514

Boma (Kata ya Boma, in Swahili) is an administrative ward of the Mkinga District in the Tanga Region of Tanzania. The ward covers a peninsula surrounded by the Pemba Channel on the east and Manza Bay on the west. The Manza and Moa wards are attached to the ward to the west. According to the 2012 Census the ward had a population of 2,587.

== Administration ==
The postal code for Boma Ward is 21514. The ward is divided into the following neighborhoods (Mitaa):

- Basi
- Boma Kichakamiba
- Boma Subutuni
- Bomandani
- Daluni

- Kichakamiba
- Manza Bay
- Mkambani
- Subutuni

=== Government ===
The ward, like every other ward in the country, has local government offices based on the population served.The Boma Ward administration building houses a court as per the Ward Tribunal Act of 1988, including other vital departments for the administration the ward. The ward has the following administration offices:

- Boma Police Station
- Boma Government Office (Afisa Mtendaji)
- Boma Tribunal (Baraza La Kata) is a Department inside Ward Government Office

In the local government system of Tanzania, the ward is the smallest democratic unit. Each ward is composed of a committee of eight elected council members which include a chairperson, one salaried officer (with no voting rights), and an executive officer. One-third of seats are reserved for women councillors.

== Demographics ==
Like much of the district, the ward is the ancestral home of the Digo people and Segeju.

== Education and health ==
=== Education ===
The ward is home to these educational institutions:

- Boma Primary School
- Mkambani Primary School

=== Healthcare ===
The ward is home to the following health institutions:

- Boma Health Center
