= Mnyenzani =

Ward of Mkinga District, Tanga Region

Mnyenzani Kata ya Mnyenzani (Swahili)
- Ward of Mkinga District
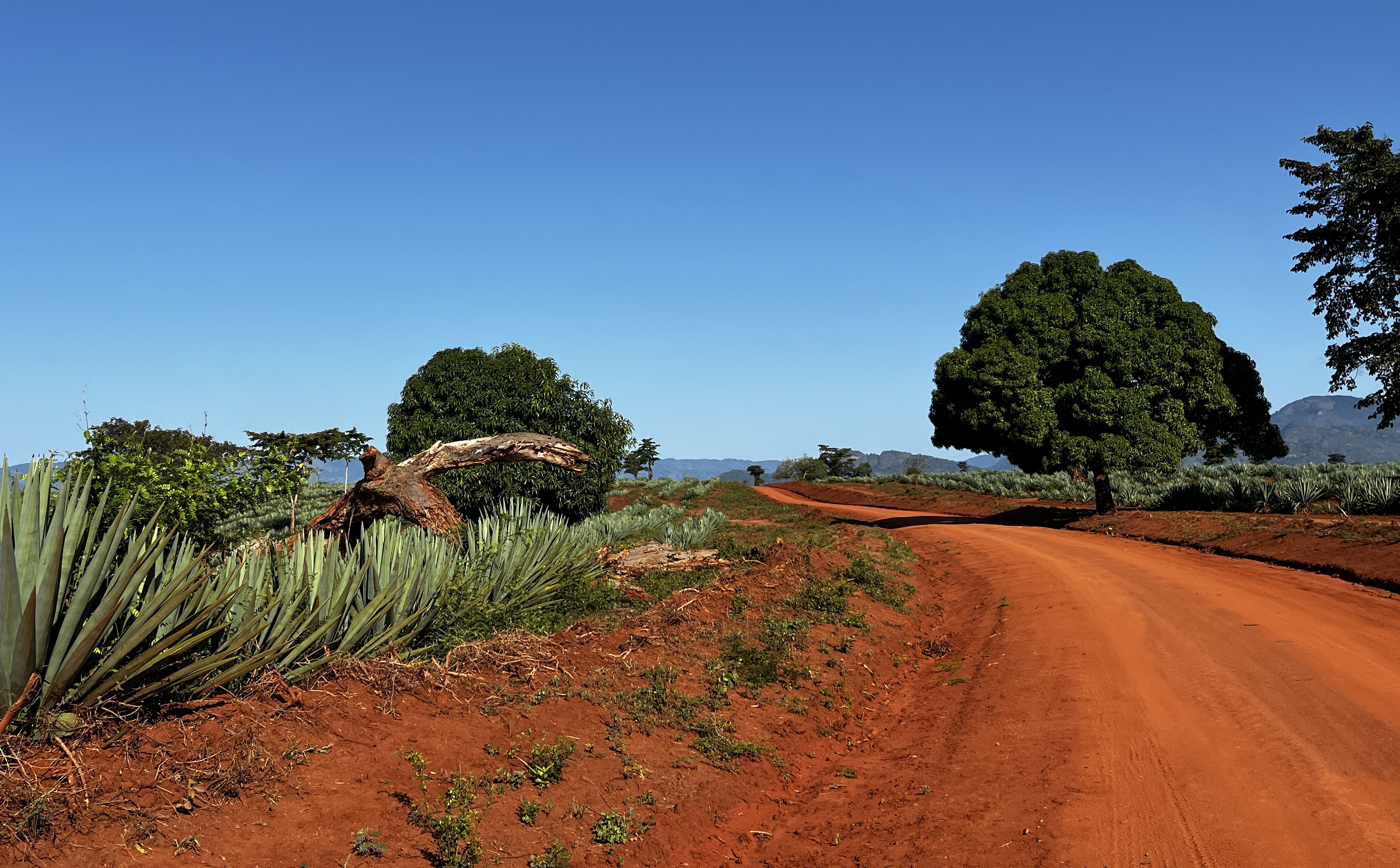
- From top to bottom: Sisal Plantation in Mnyenzani ward
- Nickname: Mkinga's sisal capital
- Location within Tanzania
- Coordinates: 5°1′37.92″S 39°54′5.76″E
- Country: Tanzania
- Region: Tanga Region
- District: Mkinga District

Area
  - Total: 31.4 km^{2} (12.1 sq mi)

Population (2012)
  - Total: 3,604

Ethnic groups
  - Settler: Swahili
  - Ancestral: Digo people
- Tanzanian Postal Code: 21503

Mnyenzani (Kata ya Mnyenzani, in Swahili) is an administrative ward of the Mkinga District in the Tanga Region of Tanzania. Its north and east boundaries are formed by Mapatano and Gombero ward. The ward's eastern border is formed by the wards of Moa and Manza. To the south are the Tanga CC ward of Kiomoni and Muheza ward of Pande Darajani. The final ward to the west is Mhinduro ward. According to the 2012 Census the ward had a population of 3,604

== Administration ==
The postal code for Mnyenzani Ward is 21503. The ward is divided into the following neighborhoods (Mitaa):

- Kibao cha Simba
- Kibaoni
- Kwangena
- Machimboni
- Mainzi
- Mazizini "A"
- Mbuyuni

- Misongeni
- Mjata
- Mjesani
- Mnyezani
- Mwamwanga
- Mwawengo
- Songea

=== Government ===
The ward, like every other ward in the country, has local government offices based on the population served.The Mnyenzani Ward administration building houses a court as per the Ward Tribunal Act of 1988, including other vital departments for the administration of the ward. The ward has the following administration offices:

- Mnyenzani Police Station
- Mnyenzani Government Office (Afisa Mtendaji)
- Mnyenzani Tribunal (Baraza La Kata) is a Department inside the Ward Government Office

In the local government system of Tanzania, the ward is the smallest democratic unit. Each ward is composed of a committee of eight elected council members which include a chairperson, one salaried officer (with no voting rights), and an executive officer. One-third of seats are reserved for women councillors.

== Demographics ==
Like much of the district, the ward is the ancestral home of the Digo people.

== Education and health ==
=== Education ===
The ward is home to these educational institutions:

- Mjesani Primary School

=== Healthcare ===
The ward is home to the following health institutions:

- Mjesani Health Center
