= Ngamiani Kati =

Ward in Tanga City Council, Tanga Region

Ngamiani Kati Kata ya Ngamiani Kati (Swahili)
- Ward of Tanga City Council
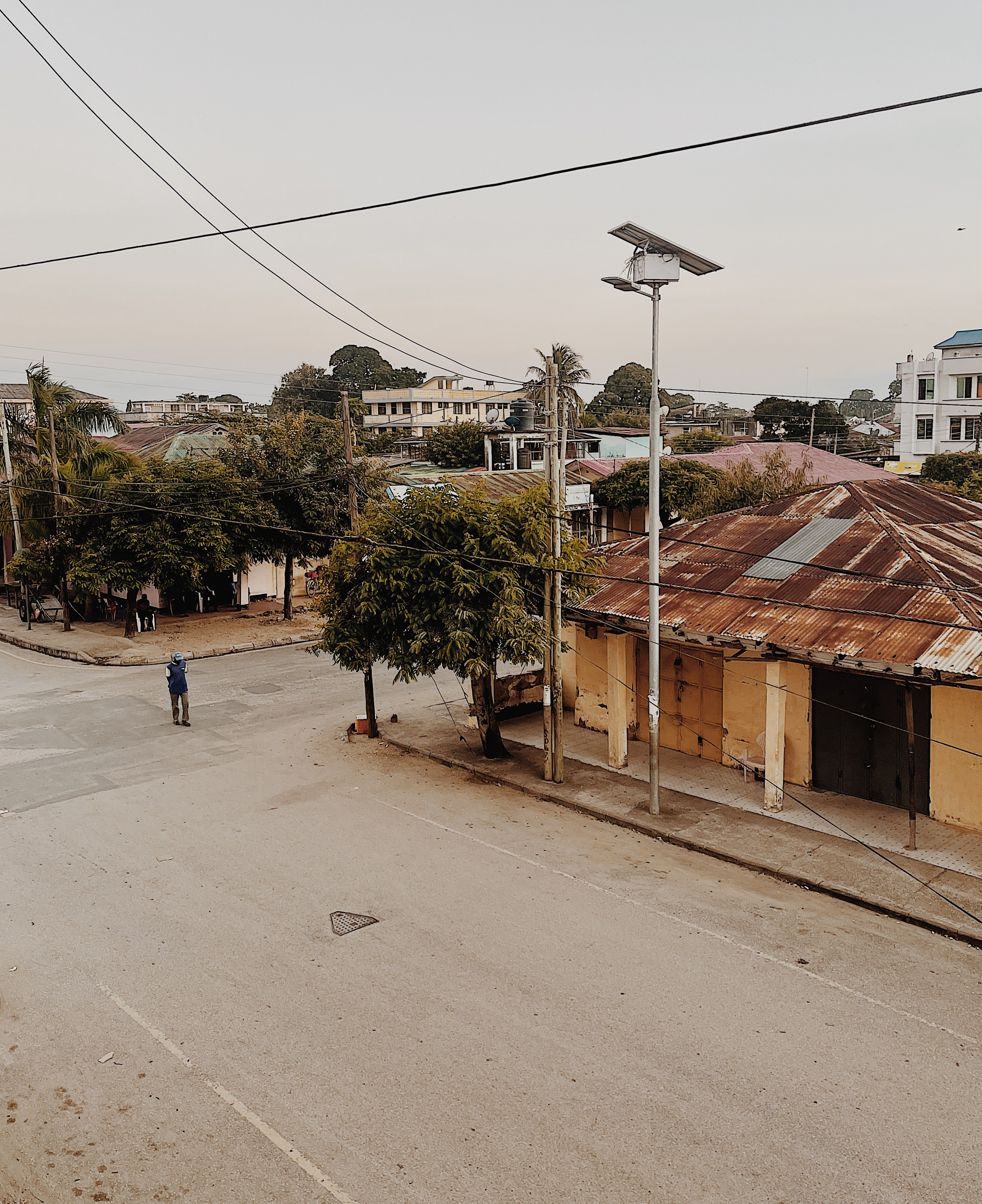
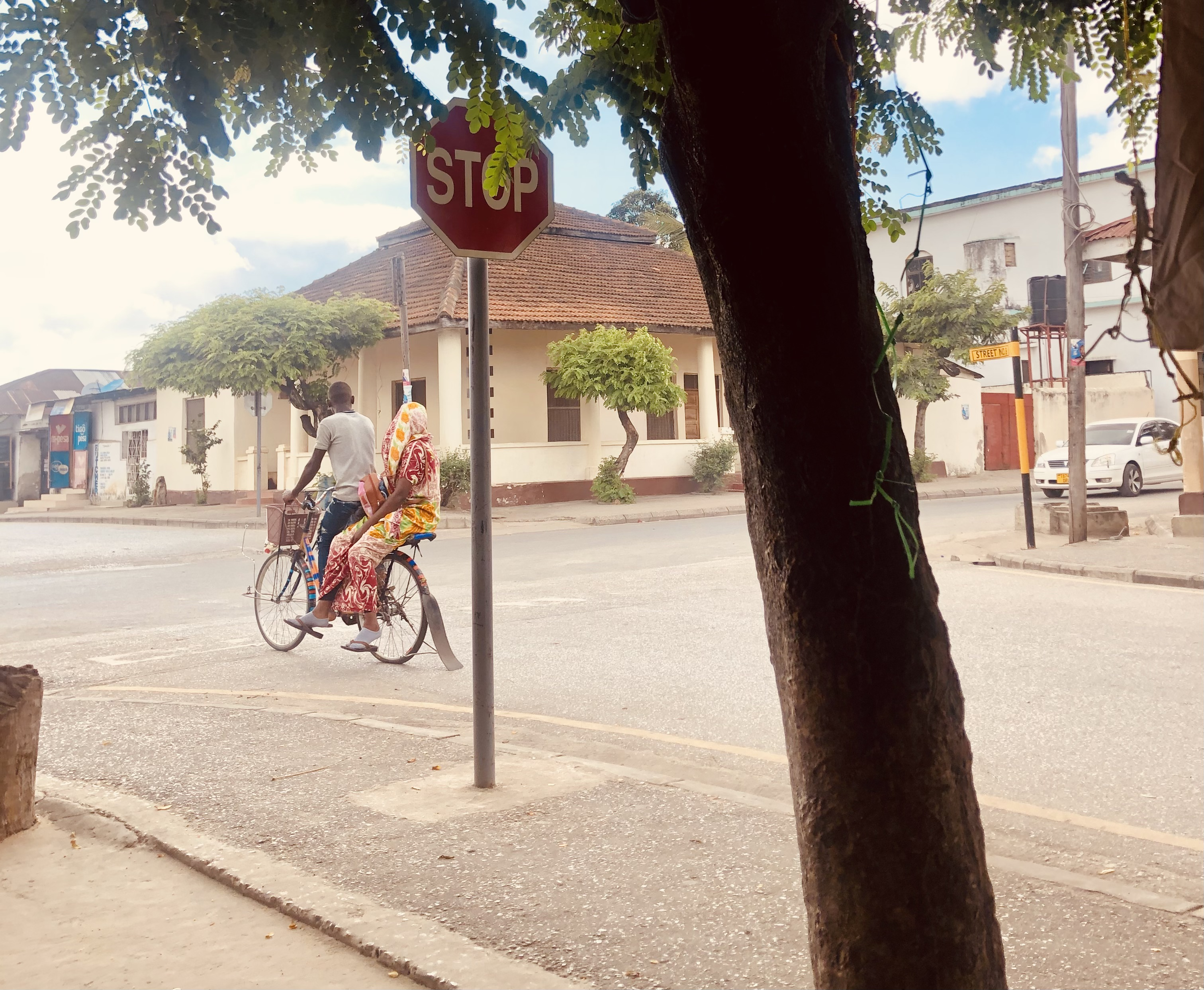
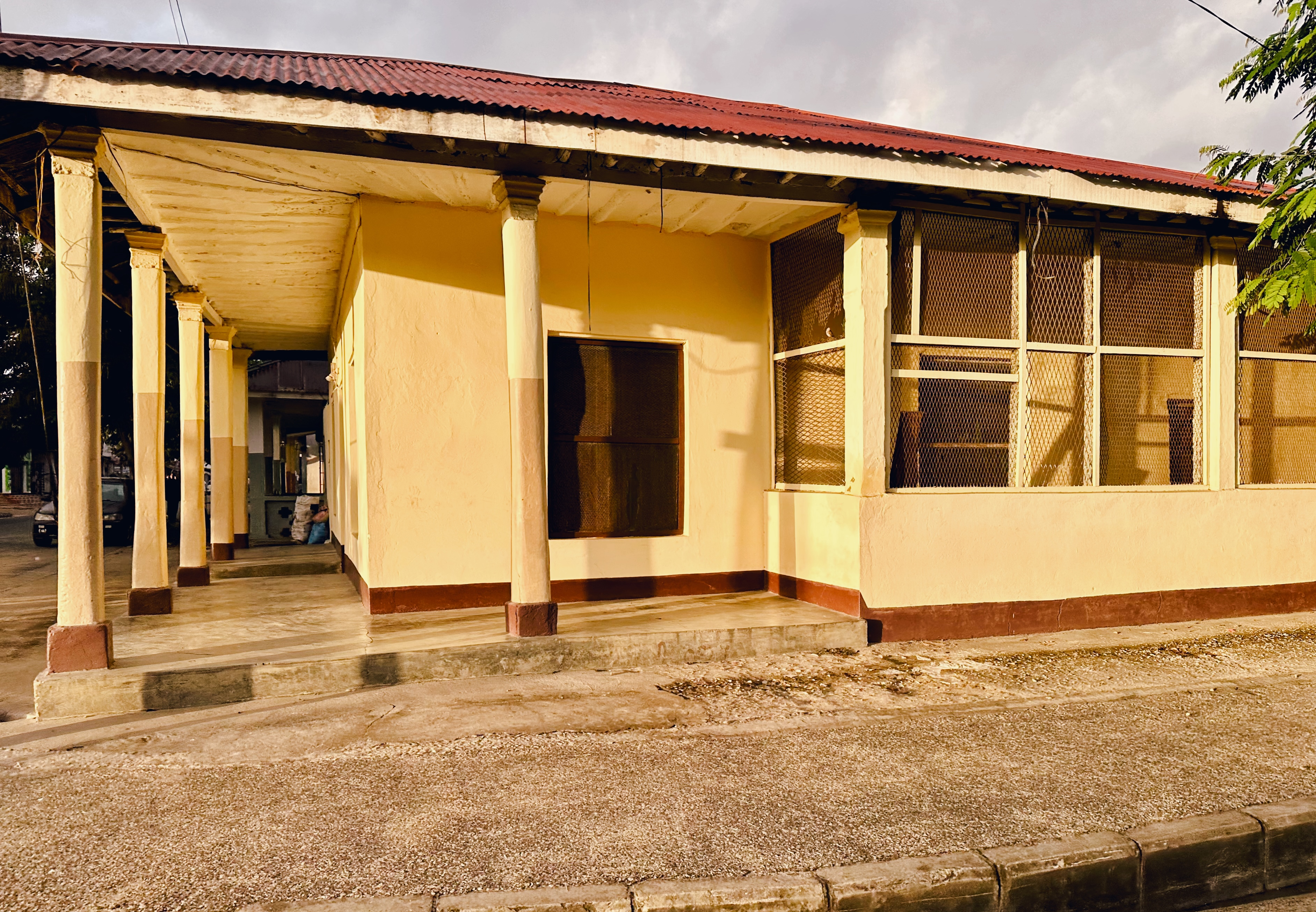
- From top to bottom: 7th Street in Ngamiani Kati ward, 8th Street in Ngamiani Kati & Swahili hoise in Ngamiani Kati ward
- Interactive map of Ngamiani Kati
- Coordinates: 5°4′45.12″S 39°6′6.48″E
- Country: Tanzania
- Region: Tanga Region
- District: Tanga City Council

Area
  - Total: 0.3 km^{2} (0.12 sq mi)

Population (2012)
  - Total: 4,755

Ethnic groups
  - Settler: Swahili
  - Ancestral: Digo & Segeju
- Tanzanian Postal Code: 21105

Ngamiani Kati (Ngamiani Kati, in Swahili) is an administrative ward in Tanga City Council of Tanga Region in Tanzania. Usagara and Ngamiani Kaskazini form the eastern and northern boundaries of the ward, respectively. Ngamiani Kusini is to the south, while Majengo Ward is to the west. The ward covers an area of 0.3 km^{2} (0.12 sq mi), and has an average elevation of 15 m (49 ft). According to the 2012 census, the ward has a total population of 4,755.

== Administration ==
The postal code for Ngamiani Kati Ward is 21202. The ward is divided into the following neighborhoods (Mitaa):

- Karafuu
- Lumumba
- Makoko
- Maua

- Mkwakwani
- Msikiti
- Swahili
- Taifa Road

=== Government ===
The ward, like every other ward in the country, has local government offices based on the population served.The Ngamiani Kati Ward administration building houses a court as per the Ward Tribunal Act of 1988, including other vital departments for the administration the ward. The ward has the following administration offices:

- Ngamiani Kati Police Station
- Ngamiani Kati Government Office (Afisa Mtendaji)
- Ngamiani Kati Tribunal (Baraza La Kata) is a Department inside Ward Government Office

In the local government system of Tanzania, the ward is the smallest democratic unit. Each ward is composed of a committee of eight elected council members which include a chairperson, one salaried officer (with no voting rights), and an executive officer. One-third of seats are reserved for women councillors.

== Demographics ==
Like much of the district, the ward is the ancestral home of the Digo people and Segeju.

== Education and health ==
=== Education ===
The ward is home to these educational institutions:

- Jabir Bin Zaid Primary School

=== Healthcare ===
The ward is home to the following health institutions:

- Imani Health Center
