= Kwale, Mkinga =

Ward of Mkinga District, Tanga Region

Kwale Kata ya Kwale (Swahili)
- Ward of Mkinga District
- From top to bottom
- Location within Tanzania
- Coordinates: 4°57′47.52″S 39°8′22.92″E
- Country: Tanzania
- Region: Tanga Region
- District: Mkinga District

Area
  - Total: 15.7 km^{2} (6.1 sq mi)

Population (2012)
  - Total: 2,430

Ethnic groups
  - Settler: Swahili
  - Ancestral: Digo people
- Tanzanian Postal Code: 21512

Kwale (Kata ya Kwale, in Swahili) is an administrative ward of the Mkinga District in the Tanga Region of Tanzania.The ward also oversees Kwale Island. The Manza and Doda wards border the ward to the north. The Pemba Channel is located to the east. Chongoleani of Tanga CC is to the south, and Mtimbwani is to the west. According to the 2012 Census the ward had a population of 2,430

== Administration ==
The postal code for Kwale Ward is 21512. The ward is divided into the following neighborhoods (Mitaa):

- Jangwa Kuu
- Kichalikani
- Kizinga Wasaa
- Kizinga-Ukuta
- Kizingani
- Kwale

- Mapuani
- Mlimani
- Monga
- Monga Vyuu
- Vyeru

=== Government ===
The ward, like every other ward in the country, has local government offices based on the population served.The Kwale Ward administration building houses a court as per the Ward Tribunal Act of 1988, including other vital departments for the administration the ward. The ward has the following administration offices:

- Kwale Police Station
- Kwale Government Office (Afisa Mtendaji)
- Kwale Tribunal (Baraza La Kata) is a Department inside Ward Government Office

In the local government system of Tanzania, the ward is the smallest democratic unit. Each ward is composed of a committee of eight elected council members which include a chairperson, one salaried officer (with no voting rights), and an executive officer. One-third of seats are reserved for women councillors.

== Demographics ==
Like much of the district, the ward is the ancestral home of the Digo people.

== Education and health ==
=== Education ===
The ward is home to these educational institutions:

- Kwale Kizingani Primary School
- Vyeru Primary School

=== Healthcare ===
The ward is home to the following health institutions:

- Vyeru Health Center
