= Manza Bay =

Coastal bay in Tanzania

- Ghuba la Manza (Swahili)
- Location in Tanzania
- Location: Tanzania, Tanga Region, Mkinga District
- Group: Pemba Channel
- Coordinates: 4°56′35″S 39°9′20″E
- Type: Bay
- Etymology: Manza ward
- Ocean/sea sources: Indian Ocean
- Designation: Protected waterbody
- Max. length: 9 km (5.6 mi)
- Max. width: 8 km (5.0 mi)
- Islands: Kwale Island
- Settlements: Kwale and Tawalani

Manza Bay (Ghuba la Manza, in Swahili) is a bay in Mkinga District of Tanga Region of Tanzania. The bay is home to Kwale Island and is surrounded in the north by Boma peninsula. It is on the coast, some 10 miles (16 km) north of the town of Tanga.

== History ==
In the East African campaign of World War I, the Royal Navy protected cruiser HMS Hyacinth attacked and damaged a German auxiliary ship off Manza Bay on 14 April 1915. It was a 3,587 GRT British cargo steamship, Rubens, which the German authorities had seized in Hamburg in 1914. The German Navy had disguised Rubens as the Danish cargo ship Kronborg and sent her to replenish the cruiser SMS Königsberg in the Indian Ocean.

The German crew succeeded in beaching their ship in the bay, salvaged all the arms and ammunition from Rubens' cargo, and abandoned her. The arms and ammunition helped German land forces in East Africa to continue their campaign against British and Empire forces.

Rubens' cargo also included coal to bunker Königsberg. In 1956 an Italian salvage company repaired Rubens' hull, refloated her, towed her to Dar es Salaam with two tugboats and sold her coal to the East African Railways and Harbours Corporation.

In World War II the Royal Navy laid indicator loops off Manza Bay to defend the coast against German and Japanese submarines.

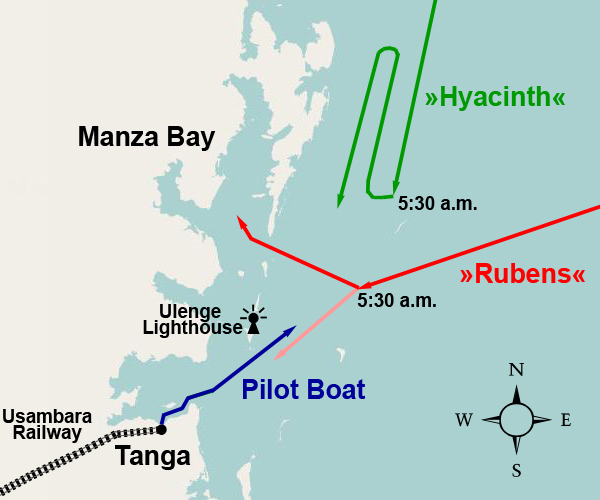
April 1915: Rubens escapes in Manza Bay.

== See also ==
Historic Swahili Settlements
