= Maziwi Island =

Protected island and marine reserve in Tanga Region of Tanzania

Maziwe Island Marine Reserve
- IUCN category II (national park)
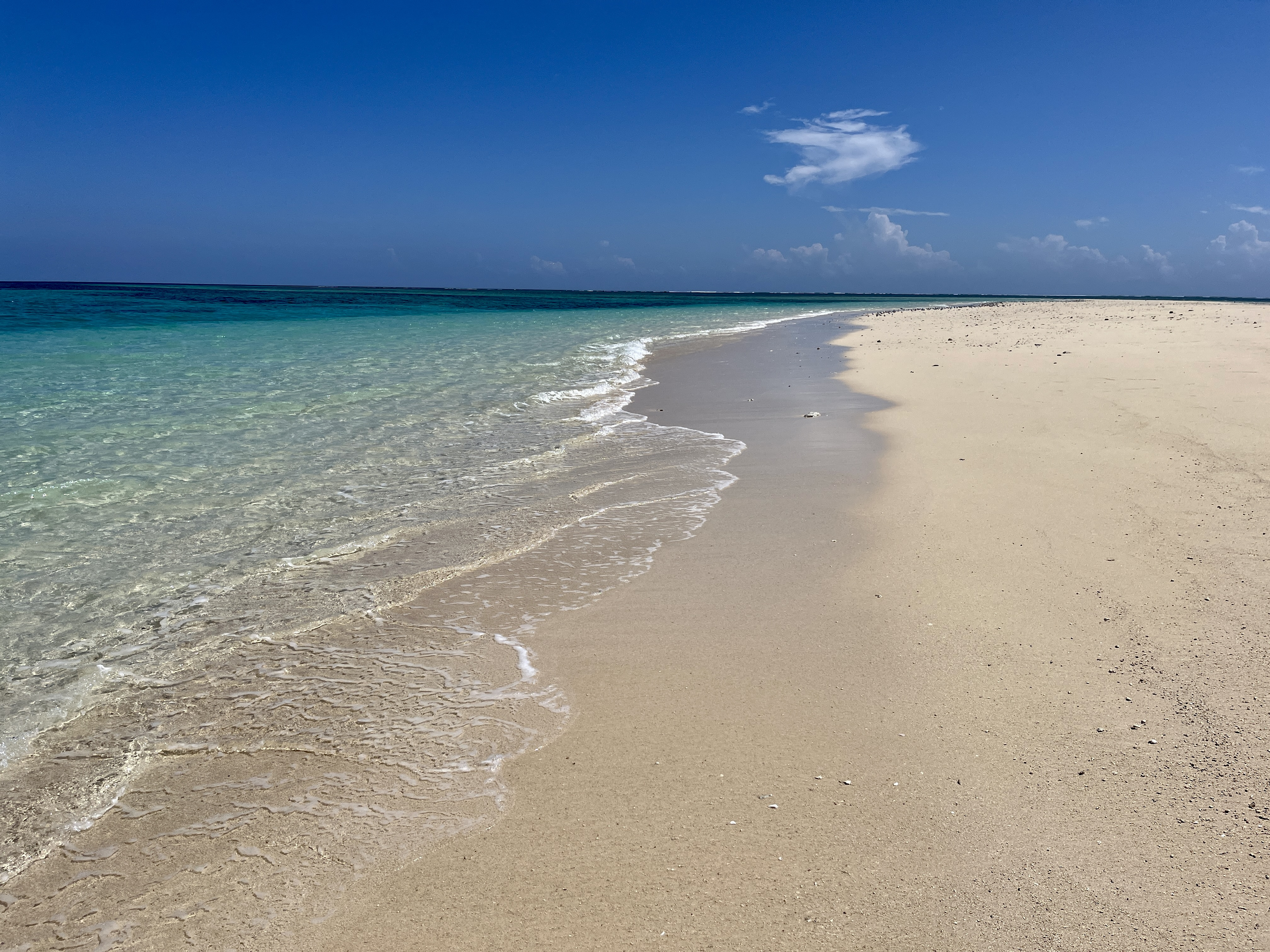
- Maziwi Island

- Location within Tanzania
- Location: Tanzania, Tanga Region, Pangani District
- Nearest city: Pangani
- Coordinates: 5°30′S 39°04′E
- Established: 1975
- Governing body: Marine Parks & Reserves Authority (Tanzania)
- Website: Maziwe Island Marine Reserve

Maziwi Island, officially The Maziwe Island Marine Reserve (Kisiwa Hifadhi Akiba Bahari cha Maziwe in Swahili), is a small island located off the northern shore of Tanzania. One of the oldest marine reserves in Tanzania, this vibrant coral reef ecosystem supports over 400 species of fish as well as a stunning diversity of coral, sponge, and algae species. Maziwe is also considered the most important breeding ground for turtles in East Africa. This coastal ecosystem is not only essential for its dependent wildlife but also for the long-term sustainability of the livelihoods of people living in the area.

== History ==
The Maziwe Island Marine Reserve, established in 1975, was Tanga's first Marine Protected Area. The Tanga Coastal Zone Conservation and Development Programme (TCZCDP), which was started in July 1994 and ran until June 2007, helped Tanga coastal regions, including Maziwe Island Marine Reserve, to understand and apply the fundamentals of ICAM. Historical records indicate that this island used to be significantly larger and was vegetated with palm trees and other shrubs. Due to local fishermen cutting trees on the island possibly in combination with sea level rise, changing current or weather patterns the island has experienced significant erosion.

== Flora and fauna ==
There is a wide diversity of marine species found in and around the island reserves. This includes over 425 species of fish, 35 species of corals, many types of birds and a number of different sea grasses, algae and sponges. The island is also home to an endemic shrimp species named Tectopontonia maziwiae. The island is a nesting site for endangered green sea turtles.

== Conservation ==
In 2005, the Dorobo Fund got together with the local Ushongo/Pangani community, recreational stakeholders, and Tanzania Marine Parks and Reserves Unit with the common goal of protecting the marine reserve. Over the years, this unique and collaborative endeavor has resulted in incentives for local fishermen, the government, and local tourism businesses.

One of the major successes has been the Friends of Maziwe Turtle Conservation Program. The island serves as an important nesting ground for green turtles, which crawl up the sandy shore to lay their eggs. However, changes to the island’s structure have led to the inundation of the turtle nests at high-tide, because of which eggs are unable to survive. The Friends of Maziwe Turtle Conservation Program, in partnership with the Ushongo village community and conservation officers, relocate turtle nests from the inundated beaches of Maziwe Island Marine Reserve and Kikogwe Beach to a protected area on Ushongo Beach.

This project has relocated more than 330 turtle nests and released over 60,000 baby turtles into the ocean. Additionally, there is expected to be long-term and wide-reaching benefits as Maziwe serves as a source area to boost fisheries in the greater area and for overall biodiversity and coastal conservation in East Africa.
