= Parungu Kasera =

Ward of Mkinga District, Tanga Region

Parungu Kasera Kata ya Parungu Kasera (Swahili)
- Ward and Capital of Mkinga District
- Nickname: Mkinga's capital
- Location within Tanzania
- Coordinates: 4°46′28.2″S 39°2′46.32″E
- Country: Tanzania
- Region: Tanga Region
- District: Mkinga District

Area
  - Total: 201.9 km^{2} (78.0 sq mi)

Population (2012)
  - Total: 4,560

Ethnic groups
  - Settler: Swahili
  - Ancestral: Digo people
- Tanzanian Postal Code: 21515

Parungu Kasera (Kata ya Parungu Kasera, in Swahili) is an administrative ward and district capital of the Mkinga District of the Tanga Region in Tanzania. North of the ward, Mwakijembe, Duga, and Sigaya form its borders. Moa and Manza wards form the eastern boundary of the ward. The wards of Mkinga and Doda are to the south. Bwiti ward is the final area to the west. According to the 2012 Census the ward had a population of 4,560.

== Administration ==
The postal code for Parungu Kasera Ward is 21515. The ward is divided into the following neighborhoods (Mitaa):

- Karibuni
- Kasera "A"
- Kasera "B"
- Kibanduni
- Kipumbwi
- Kipumbwi Magodi
- Kiuyuni
- Kivuleni
- Kombe

- Magaoni
- Mugegeni
- Mzingi Mwagogo
- Parungu
- Parungu Kasera
- Sonjo
- Vichatini
- Yogweni

=== Government ===
The ward, like every other ward in the country, has local government offices based on the population served.The Parungu Kasera Ward administration building houses a court as per the Ward Tribunal Act of 1988, including other vital departments for the administration the ward. The ward has the following administration offices:

- Parungu Kasera Police Station
- Parungu Kasera Government Office (Afisa Mtendaji)
- Parungu Kasera Tribunal (Baraza La Kata) is a Department inside Ward Government Office

In the local government system of Tanzania, the ward is the smallest democratic unit. Each ward is composed of a committee of eight elected council members which include a chairperson, one salaried officer (with no voting rights), and an executive officer. One-third of seats are reserved for women councillors.

== Demographics ==
Like much of the district, the ward is the ancestral home of the Digo people.

== Education and health ==
=== Education ===
The ward is home to these educational institutions:

- Kasera Primary School
- Mzingi Primary School
- Magodi Primary School

=== Healthcare ===
The ward is home to the following health institutions:

- Magodi Health Center
