= Usambara shrew =

Conservation status
- Vulnerable (IUCN 3.1)

Scientific classification
- Kingdom: Animalia
- Phylum: Chordata
- Class: Mammalia
- Order: Eulipotyphla
- Family: Soricidae
- Genus: Crocidura
- Species: C. usambarae

Binomial name
- Crocidura usambarae Dippenaar, 1980
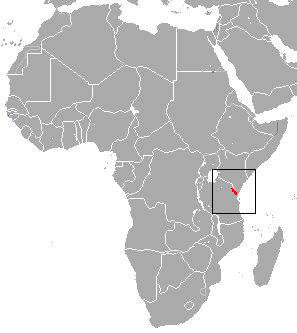
- Usambara shrew range

Species of mammal

The Usambara shrew (Crocidura usambarae) is a species of mammal in the family Soricidae. It is endemic to Bumbuli District of Tanga Region in Tanzania. Its natural habitat is subtropical or tropical moist montane forests of Usambara mountains.
