= Moa, Mkinga =

Ward of Mkinga District, Tanga Region

Moa Kata ya Moa (Swahili)
- Ward of Mkinga District
- From top to bottom
- Location within Tanzania
- Coordinates: 4°46′6.96″S 39°10′20.64″E
- Country: Tanzania
- Region: Tanga Region
- District: Mkinga District

Area
  - Total: 26.1 km^{2} (10.1 sq mi)

Population (2012)
  - Total: 4,339

Ethnic groups
  - Settler: Swahili
  - Ancestral: Digo & Segeju
- Tanzanian Postal Code: 21517

Moa (Kata ya Moa, in Swahili) is an administrative ward of the Mkinga District in the Tanga Region of Tanzania. The north-eastern ward is formed by the Pemba Channel. The wards of Manza and Boma are to the south. The Sigaya and Parungu Kasera wards are to the west, and Mayomboni ward is to the north. According to the 2012 Census the ward had a population of 4,339

== Administration ==
The postal code for Moa Ward is 21517. The ward is divided into the following neighborhoods (Mitaa):

- Bajo
- Kastamu
- Kigirini
- Kirui
- Loko
- Magumbani
- Makobeni
- Mbuluni

- Moa
- Mwaboza
- Mwagula
- Mwakamba
- Petukiza
- Vuo
- Vuo "B" Mwachala
- Zingibari

=== Government ===
The ward, like every other ward in the country, has local government offices based on the population served.The Moa Ward administration building houses a court as per the Ward Tribunal Act of 1988, including other vital departments for the administration the ward. The ward has the following administration offices:

- Moa Police Station
- Moa Government Office (Afisa Mtendaji)
- Moa Tribunal (Baraza La Kata) is a Department inside Ward Government Office

In the local government system of Tanzania, the ward is the smallest democratic unit. Each ward is composed of a committee of eight elected council members which include a chairperson, one salaried officer (with no voting rights), and an executive officer. One-third of seats are reserved for women councillors.

== Demographics ==
Like much of the district, the ward is the ancestral home of the Digo people and Segeju.

== Education and health ==
=== Education ===
The ward is home to these educational institutions:

- Moa Primary School
- Zingibari Primary School
- Zingibari Secondary School
- Vuo Primary School

=== Healthcare ===
The ward is home to the following health institutions:

- Moa Health Center
- Vuo Dispensary
