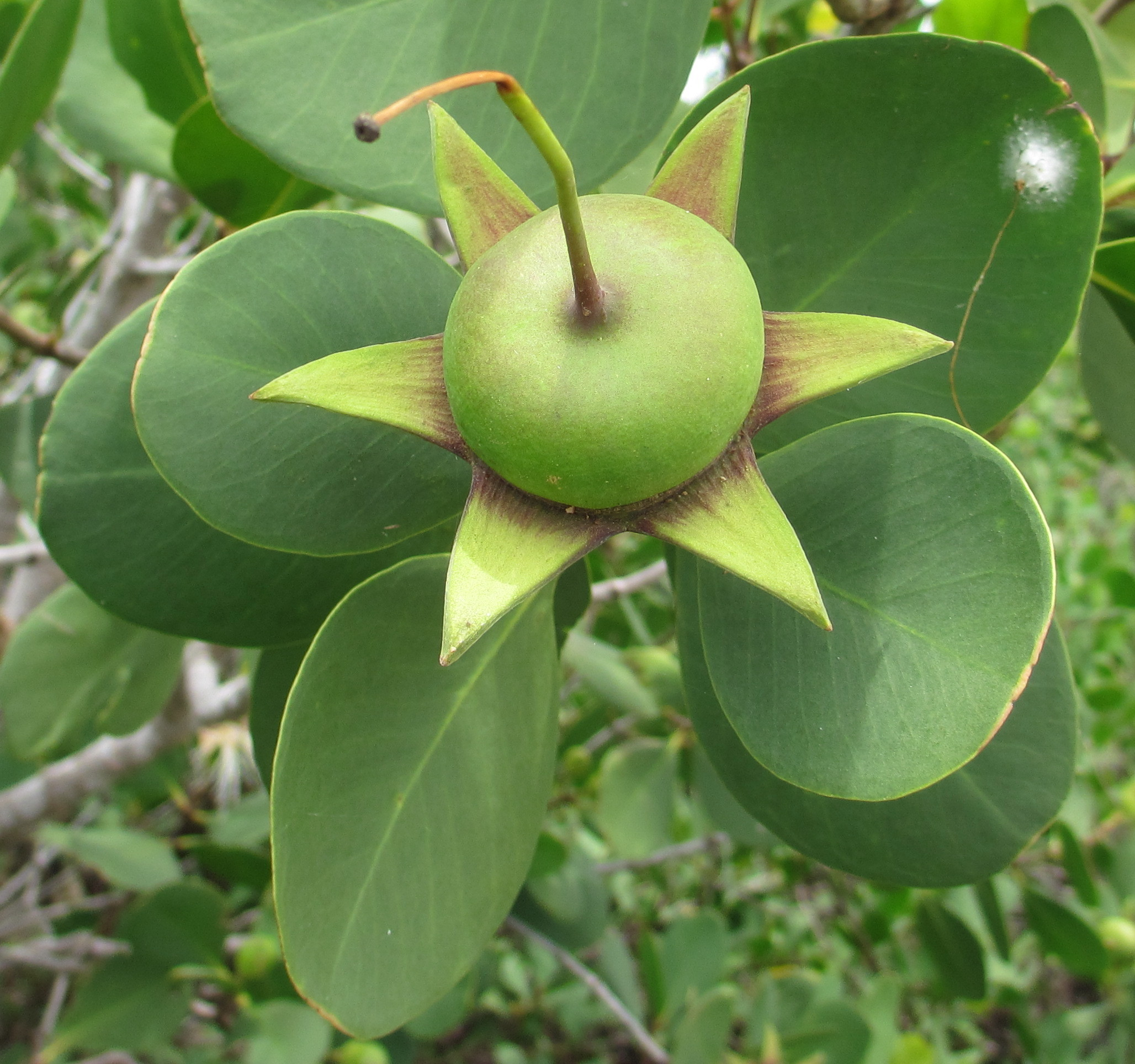
- Fruit
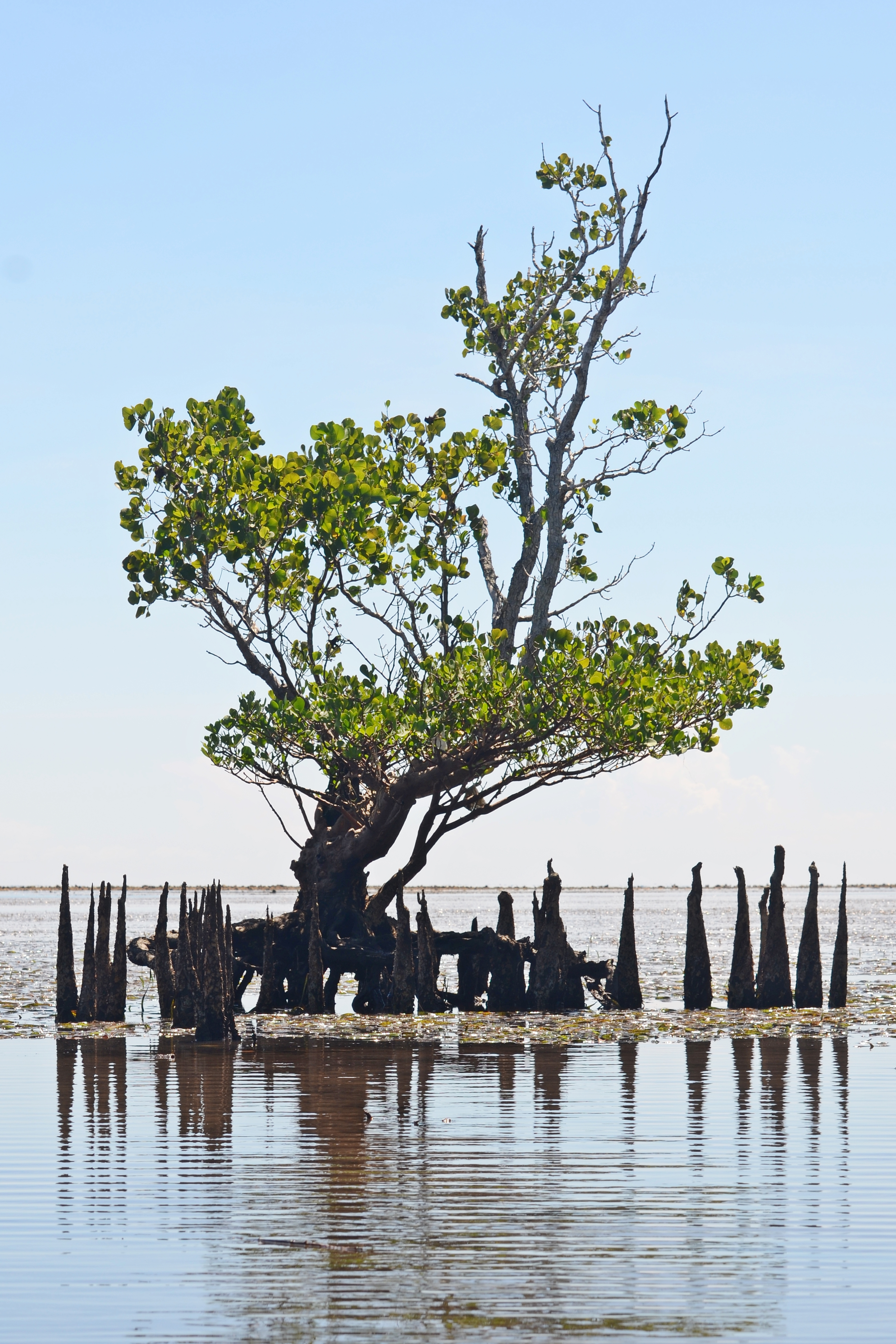
- Tree

Conservation status
- Least Concern (IUCN 3.1)

Scientific classification
- Kingdom: Plantae
- Clade: Tracheophytes
- Clade: Angiosperms
- Clade: Eudicots
- Clade: Rosids
- Order: Myrtales
- Family: Lythraceae
- Genus: Sonneratia
- Species: S. alba

Binomial name
- Sonneratia alba Sm.

Synonyms
- Sonneratia iriomotensis Masam.; Sonneratia mossambicensis Klotzsch ex Peters

= Sonneratia alba =

Species of tree

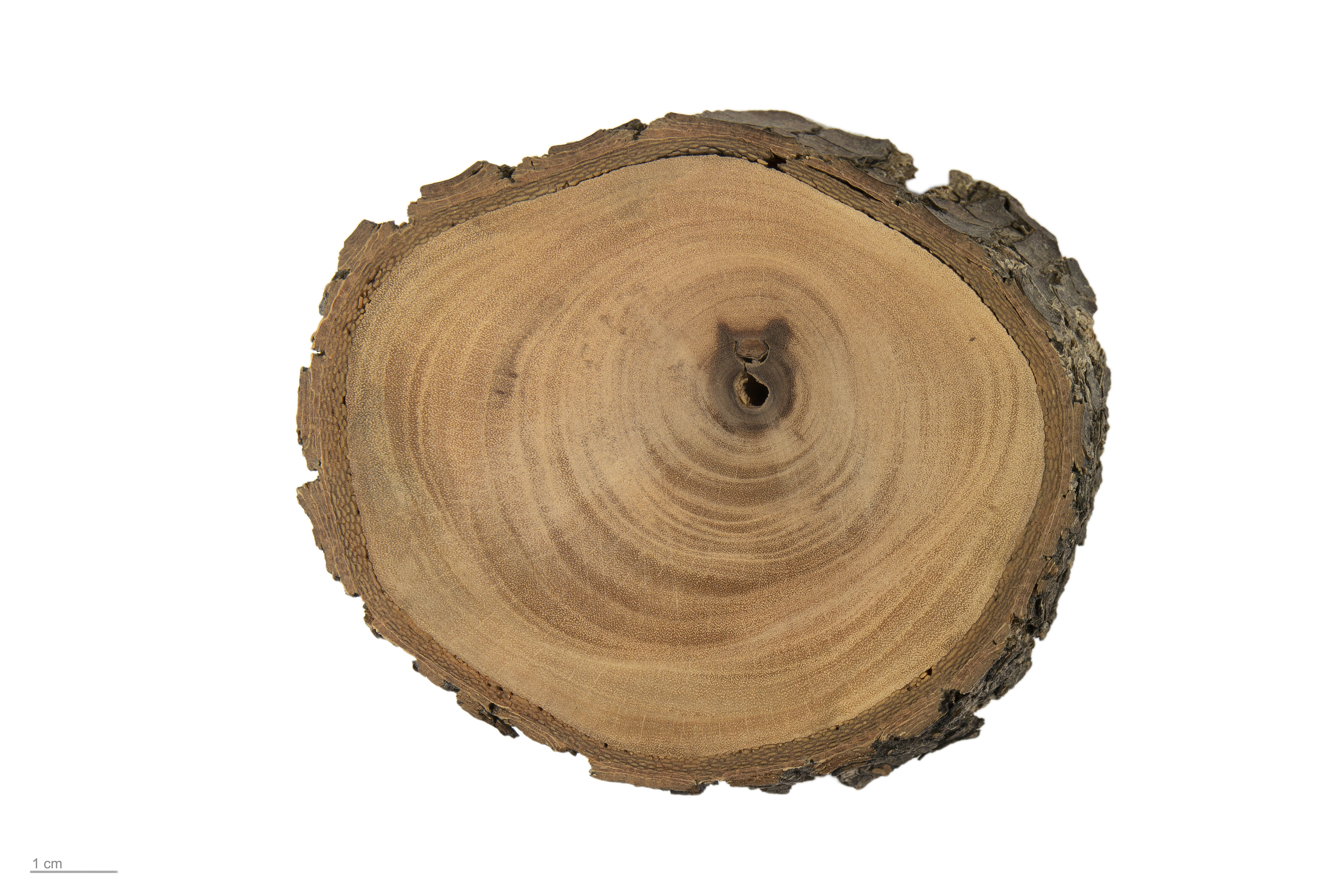
Sonneratia alba (MHNT)

Sonneratia alba is a mangrove tree in the family Lythraceae. The specific epithet alba is from the Latin meaning 'white', referring to the flowers.

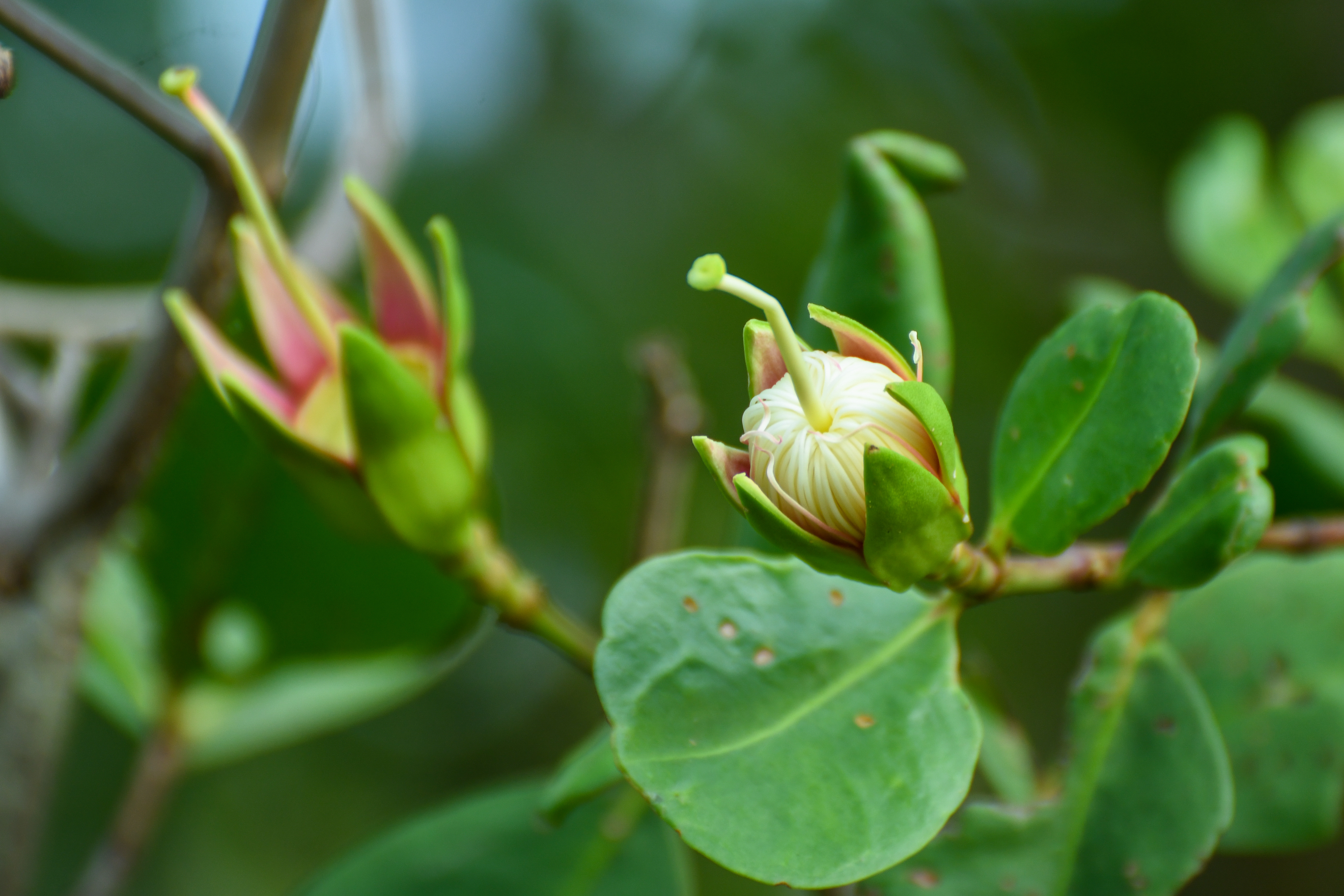
Flower

== Description ==
S. alba grows up to 40 m (130 ft) tall with a trunk diameter up to 70 cm (30 in). The cracked to fissured bark is brownish, turning grey below the tidal mark. The flowers are white, with pink at their base. The dark green fruits measure up to 5 cm (2 in) long.

== Distribution and habitat ==
S. alba grows naturally in many tropical and subtropical areas from East Africa to the Indian subcontinent, southern China, the Ryukyu Islands, Indochina, Malesia, Papuasia, Australia, and the Western Pacific region. Its habitat is sheltered, sandy seashores and tidal creeks.

== Uses ==
In Borneo, S. alba is used as firewood. In Sulawesi, the wood is used in the construction of houses and ships. In Malaysia and Indonesia, the sour fruits are used to flavor fish, and are sometimes eaten raw. The leaves are also eaten raw or cooked.
