= Mkinga District =

District of Tanga Region, Tanzania

Mkinga District Wilaya ya Mkinga (Swahili)
- District of Tanga
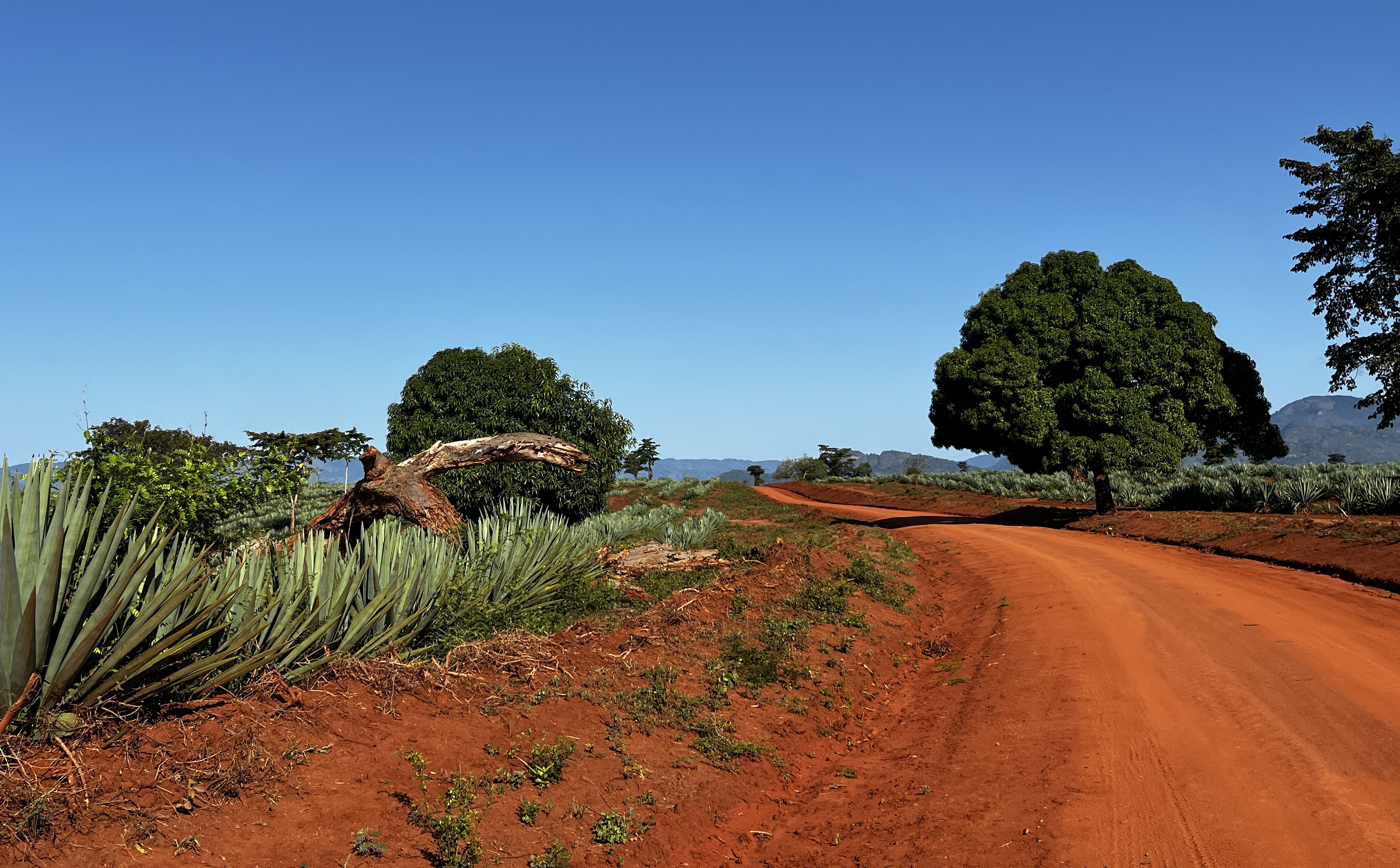
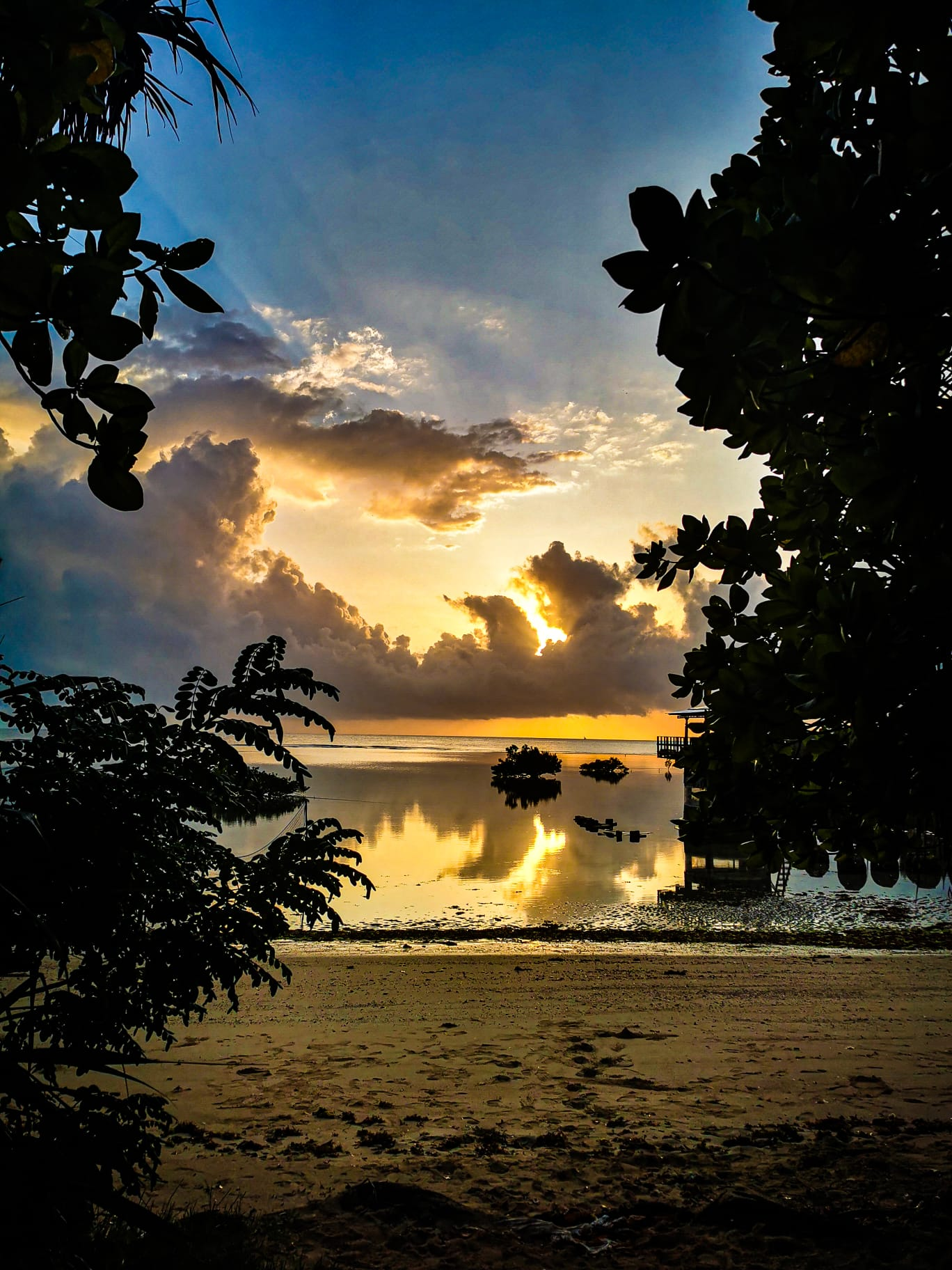
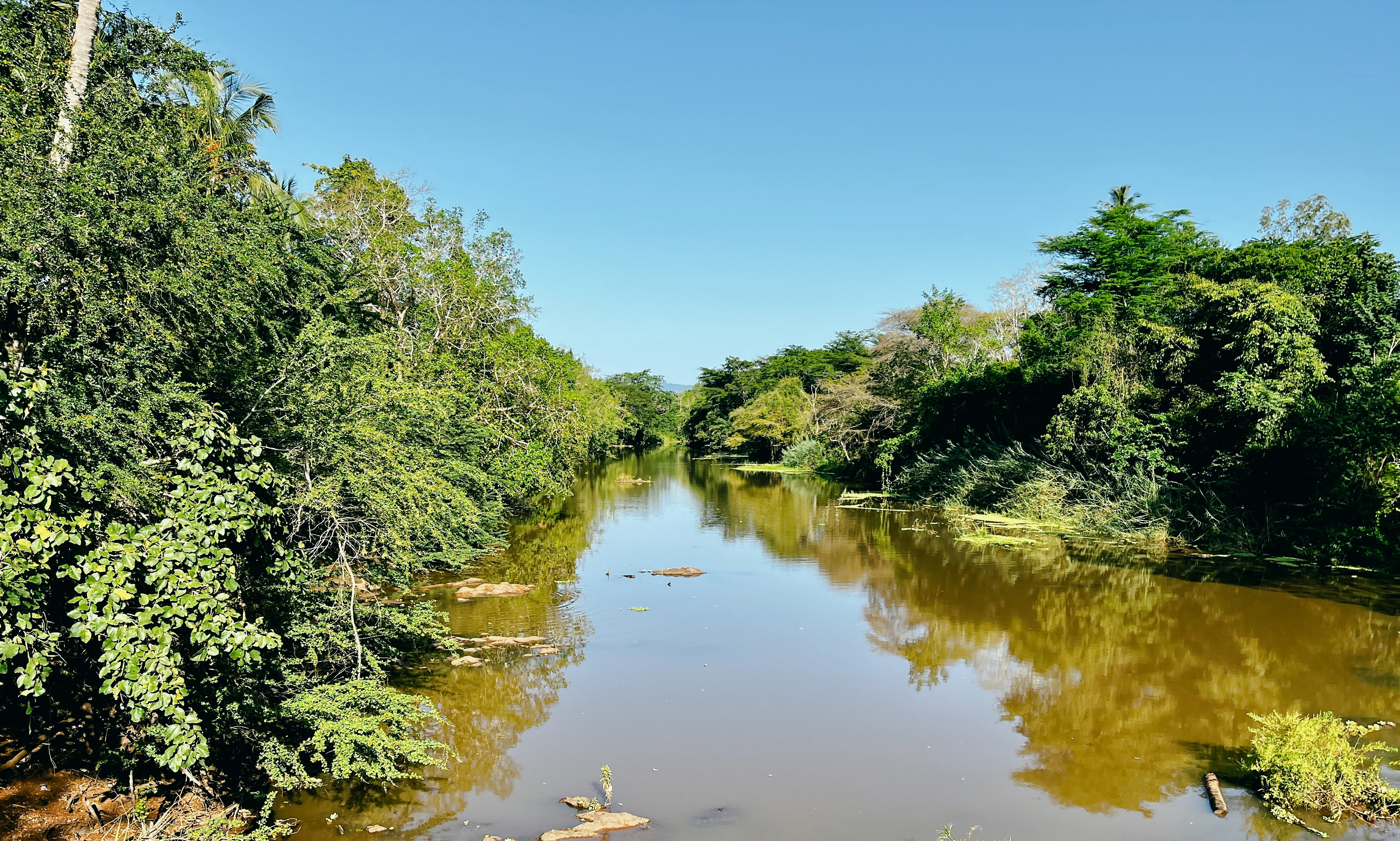
- From top to bottom: Red soil of Myenzani ward of Muheza District, sunrise in Mkinga & Zigi River in Mkinga District
- Nickname: Tanga's north coast
- Mkinga District in Tanga 2022
- Coordinates: 4°47′43.08″S 38°54′15.12″E
- Country: Tanzania
- Region: Tanga Region
- District: 1 July 2007
- Named for: Mkinga ward
- Capital: Parungu Kasera

Area
  - Total: 2,712 km^{2} (1,047 sq mi)
  - Rank: 5th in Tanga
- Highest elevation (Mhinduro Peak): 913 m (2,995 ft)

Population (2022)
  - Total: 146,802
  - Density: 54.13/km^{2} (140.2/sq mi)
- Demonym: Mkingan

Ethnic groups
  - Settler: Swahili
  - Native: Segeju & Digo
- Time zone: UTC+3 (EAT)
- Tanzanian Postcode: 215
- Website: Official website
- Symbols of Tanzania
- Bird: Usambara double-collared sunbird
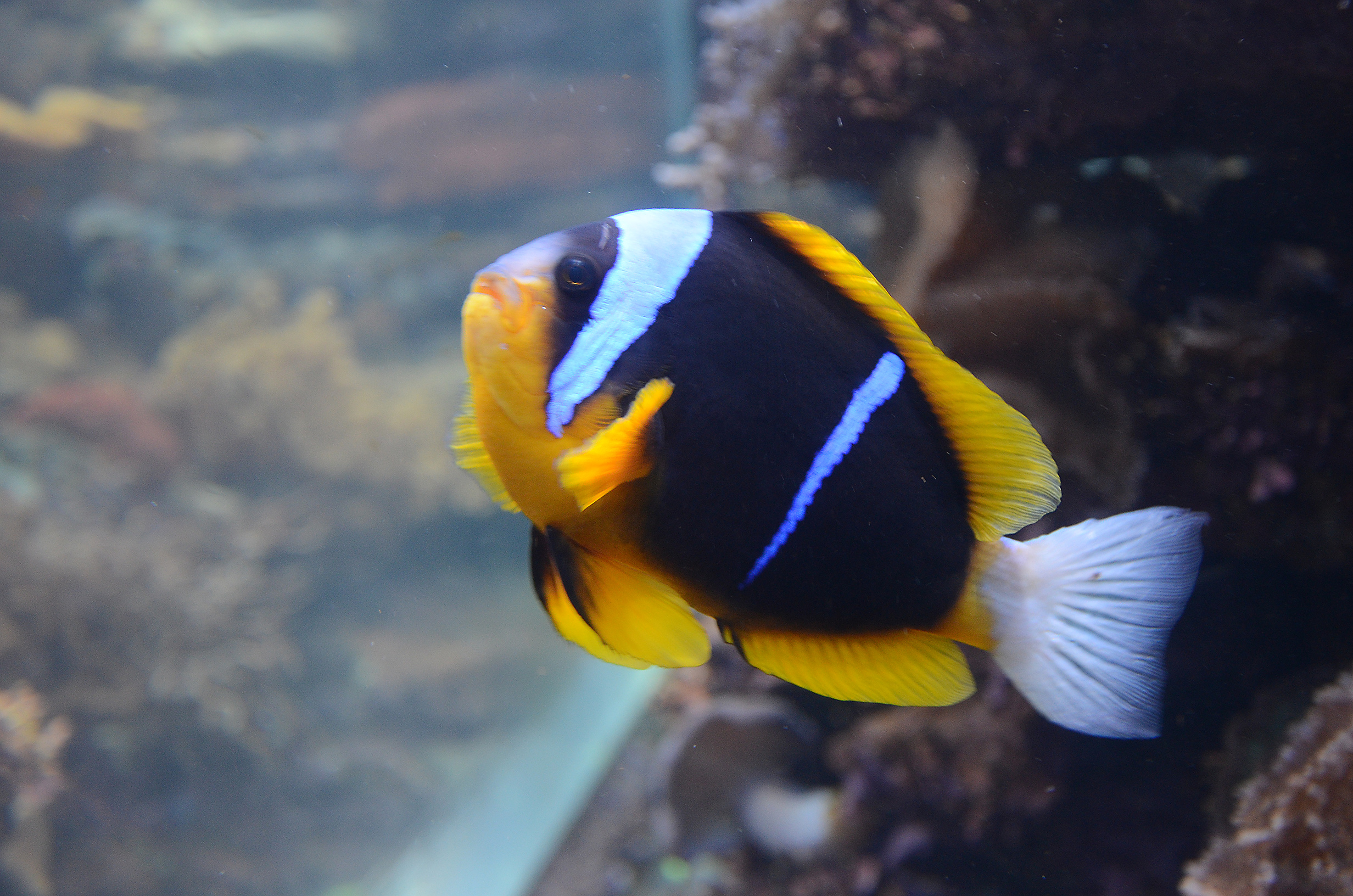
- Fish: Allard's clownfish

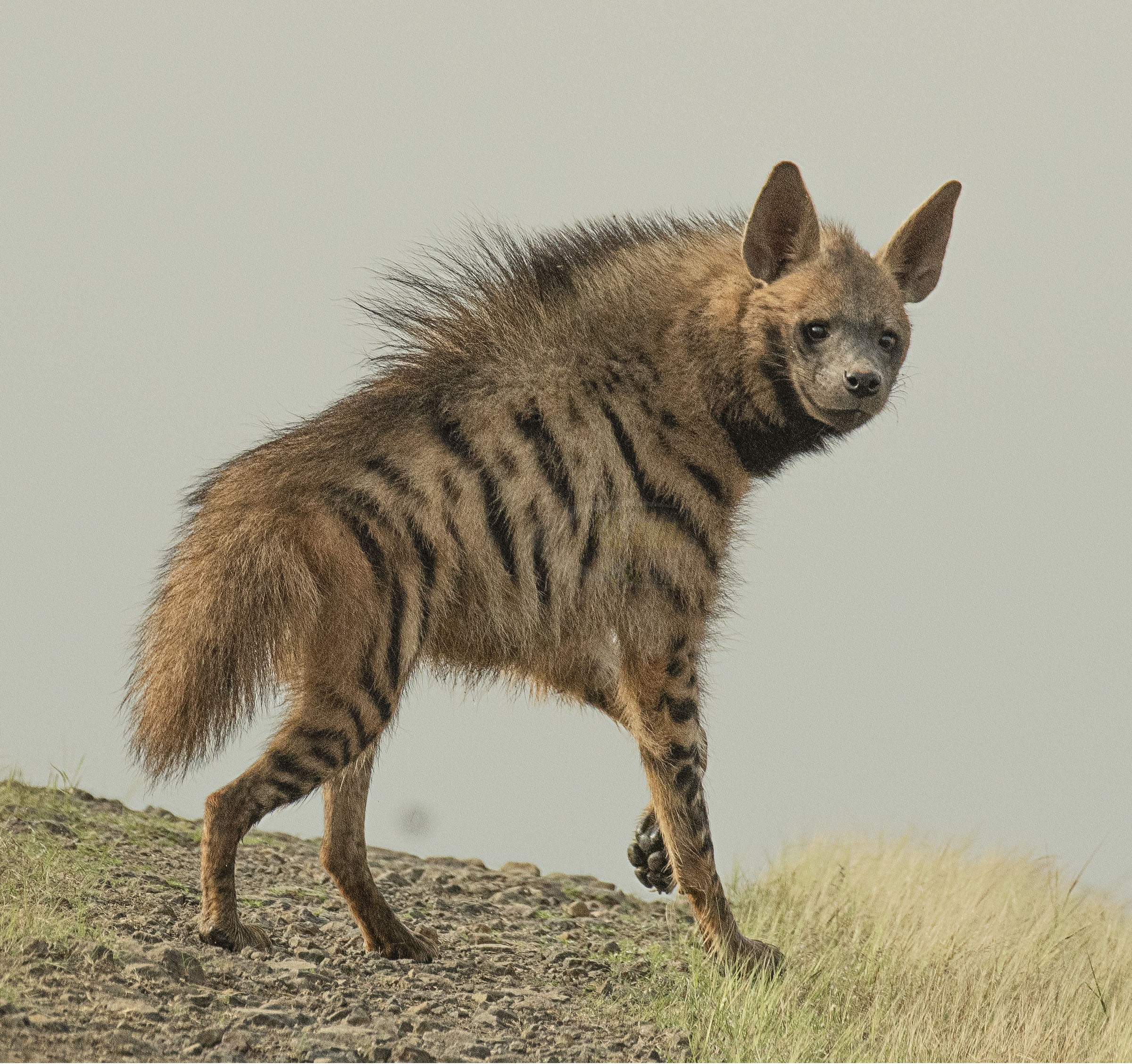
- Mammal: Striped hyena

Mkinga District, officially the, Mkinga District Council (Wilaya ya Mkinga, in Swahili) is one of eleven administrative districts of Tanga Region in Tanzania. It was created from Muheza District in 2007. The District covers an area of 2,712 km^{2} (1,047 sq mi). The district is comparable in size to the land area of Samoa. The administrative capital of the district is Parungu Kasera. The district is bordered by Tanga District to the south east and Muheza District to the south west. On the east the district is bordered by the Indian Ocean. On the west is Korogwe District and Lushoto District. The latter's northern boundary is a slither of Mkomazi National Park. On the north the district borders Kenya. The highest point in the district is Mhinduro Peak at 913m. The district is home to the Umba Game Controlled Area, the Umba Valley; the world's only source of Umba saffires. According to the 2022 Tanzania National Census, the population of Mkinga District was 146,802.

== Administrative subdivisions ==
Administratively, there are 2 divisions, 21 wards, 85 villages, 335 Vitongoji (hamlets), and 1 election constituency within the council.

=== Wards ===
As of 2012, Mkinga District is administratively divided into 22 wards:

1. Boma
2. Bosha
3. Bwiti
4. Daluni
5. Doda
6. Duga
1. Gombero
2. Kigongoi Magharibi
3. Kigongoi Mashariki
4. Kwale
5. Manza
1. Mapatano
2. Maramba
3. Mayomboni
4. Mhinduro
5. Mkinga
1. Mnyenzani
2. Moa
3. Mtimbwani
4. Mwakijembe
5. Parungu Kasera
6. Sigaya

== Geography ==
There are many different topographic characteristics in Mkinga District. The coastal plain rises to around 100 meters above sea level and stretches 20 to 30 kilometers inland from the India Ocean. The rest of the District climbs gradually to a height of roughly 400 meters above sea level as it moves from the east toward the northern and mid-southern regions. The northern regions gradually increase toward the Umba hills, which stretch into Kenya and are around 800 meters high.

The Zigi River, which separates Muheza and Mkinga districts by flowing southeast into the Indian Ocean, serves as the district's primary drainage system. The Umba River drains the majority of the district's northern region, flowing east into Kenya before emptying into the Indian Ocean.

=== Climate ===
The district features a semi-arid climate with variations in the amount of rainfall, landforms, soil types, and potentials for land use. Typically, there is enough rainfall to support the cultivation of many different crops. Bimodal rainfall in the district ranges from 450 to 1000 mm, with an average of 750 mm. 16 °C is the usual temperature. In the council's 18 km^{2}. of land, which comprises a separate biological zone, the population's primary sources of income are fishing and mariculture.

== Economy ==
The backbone of the Mkinga economy is agriculture. The district's residents rely on agriculture for more than 80% of their income. Despite the fact that 80% of the population is dependent on agriculture, poverty continues to be a pervasive problem, especially for homes whose crop production is the sole source of income. The condition is demonstrated by the populace's low per capita income. Mkinga's per capita in 2010 was 230,000 TZS, which is low compared to the region's 765,331 TZS and the country's 770,464 TZS in 2011. German colonial period saw the initial development of sisal estates, and the sector dominated the local economy up until the 1970s. Through the port of Tanga, substantial amounts of sisal from the Mkinga District were exported. A significant source of employment, the sisal plantations drew laborers from as far afield as Zambia and Mozambique. In the wake of the industry's collapse, the majority of estates stopped producing. Large plantations like Kauzeni Estate Hekta 608, Lugongo Estate Hekta 3669.4, Mjesani Estate Hekta 6420, and Mtapwa Estate Hekta 475 produced a lot of sisal during the 1970s.

Since sisal plantations employed a sizable population and provided them with a means of money to support their way of life, their demise had a noticeable effect on the neighborhood. Not only was sisal production utilized to alleviate poverty, but there was also a lack of community empowerment on the part of the government to make use of other resources, such as the abundant arable land; the average household only cultivates around one acre. Despite the fact that about 80% of the population works in agriculture, only 30% of arable land is thought to be cultivated. There are 250,580 acres of arable land in the district. The area used for agriculture is only 75,574 (Ha).

=== Fishing ===
Within its seven wards, the Mkinga district is home to 21 fishing communities, including Mayomboni, Moa, Kwale, Manza, Boma, Doda, and Mtibwani. There are roughly 2086 and 410 fishing boats, of which 396 are active and 14 are malformed. Additionally, there are 20 fish farmers, 10 pearl oyster merchants, and 70 seaweed farmers divided into two groups.

=== Infrastructure ===
Paved trunk road T13 from Tanga to the Kenyan border passes through the district at the town of Horohoro. The 406 km of roads in the Mkinga district are divided into feeder roads, district roads, and regional highways (all falling under TANROADS). Tanga Regional roads cover 85 kilometers, while district and feeder roads cover 321 kilometers. In the meanwhile, 40 kilometers of regional roads (from Mtimbwani to the Horohoro border) are being upgraded from gravel to tarmac. Generally speaking, 81 km of the district's 285 km of earth roads have been improved to gravel standards. Only 50% of the whole road network is passable in all weather. Some settlements are still not reachable by road. Kibewani-Mzingi (12 km), Mjesani-Gombero (17 km), Gombero-Mkinga (18 km), Kizingani-Gandikani-Kwale (5 km) are a few of these communities.

=== Trade ===
Mkinga has very small trade sector. For instance, the number of guest houses with a business license climbed from 60 in 2008 to 150 in 2011. From 20 in 2008 to 60 in 2011, pubs and glossaries were granted a hard drink license. More businessmen and small business owners who qualify for business licenses are still being educated and trained by trade officers to register their businesses. However, the amount of money collected annually by the council increased from 68 million in the fiscal year 2007/2008 to 300 million in the fiscal year 2010/2011.

=== Natural resources and tourism ===
There are extensive forest reserves in the Mkinga District. In Tanzania's Eastern Arc of Mountains, some of the Usambara, home to unique variety and endemic species of their flora and fauna are located in the western part of the district. Before 1990, there were 5 forest reserves totaling roughly 20,145 hectares. Before independence, these reserves were formed. Since the 1990s, when the Central Government established ten additional forest reserves, the area covered by forest reserves has grown to 5,394 hectares. Additionally, the district contained the well-known hunting and tourist destinations of the Game Controlled Area of Umba and the Open Areas of Mkota and Mwakijembe.

== Population ==
The council had a total of 23,214 households with a population of 106,837, out of whom 52,871 were men (49.5%) and 53,966 were women (50.5%), with an average growth rate of 1.27%, according to the October 2002 population census. On the basis of an average growth rate of 1.27%, it is predicted that there will be 118,187 people living there by the year 2011. A further estimate revealed a population density of 1.27 people per square kilometer. Most of the residents of the district are from the Digo, Segejeu, and Wasambaa ethnic groups, the former two being the native groups.

== Education & Health ==
=== Education ===
As of 2022, there were 94 Schools in Mkinga District, 79 of are primary schools and 15 are secondary schools. The primary education department comprises 76 primary schools with a total of 28,254 students, 14,258 of whom are boys and 13,996 of whom are girls. These students are in grades I through VII. Because it complies with the National rate, which mandates that every child of school age be enrolled, the Standard I enrolment status is satisfactory. According to enrollment records from 2011, all anticipated school-age children were registered. A total of 5339 students, comprising 2733 boys and 2606 girls, or 104% of the anticipated student population, were enrolled. In the district's 21 wards, there are a total of 15 secondary Schools. There are 6741 pupils enrolled in these schools, 3633 of whom are boys and 3633 of whom are girls. There are 22 disabled pupils among them, 10 of whom are boys with physical disabilities, one boy with a skin condition, and 11 girls as of 2012.

The Complementary Basic Education in Tanzania (COBET) and Integrated Community Based Adult Education (ICBAE) programs both fall within the purview of the Adult Education unit. There are 2,300 students enrolled in adult education circles (classes), including elementary classes, upgrading classes, and fund-raising groups, of which 847 are men and 1453 are women.

=== Health ===
In Terms of Healthcare facilities, as of 2022 Mkinga District is home to 3 health centers and 27 clinics. There is no district hospital; instead, the community accesses healthcare through a referral system to the regional hospital in Bombo. This is a significant issue that forces serious patients, particularly pregnant women, to travel great distances in order to access medical care, particularly surgical services.

Another issue in the District is a lack of access to safe and clean water, especially during dry seasons when only 54.3% of the population does, which increases the risk of communicable diseases.
