= Pemba Channel =

Strait in Tanga Region, Tanzania

Coordinates: 5°07′55″S 39°23′10″E

Pemba Channel (Tanzania)

The Pemba Channel is the strait separating the eastern coast of mainland Africa on the coast of central and northern Tanga Region from Pemba Island to the south of the Indian Ocean. The channel is entirely in Tanzanian territorial waters

The Pemba Channel is well known to be teeming with fish; marlins, tiger sharks, hammerhead sharks, yellowfin tunas, wahoos, giant trevallies and barracudas are some of the species found in the area, together with sea turtles, dolphins, dugongs and occasional whales.

The Pemba Channel Fishing Club, located on the Kenyan coast at Shimoni, is one of the oldest and most famous African fishing clubs; Ernest Hemingway, among others, practiced high sea fishing there.
