= Digo people =

Ethnic group from Tanzania and Kenya

Digo
Wadigo
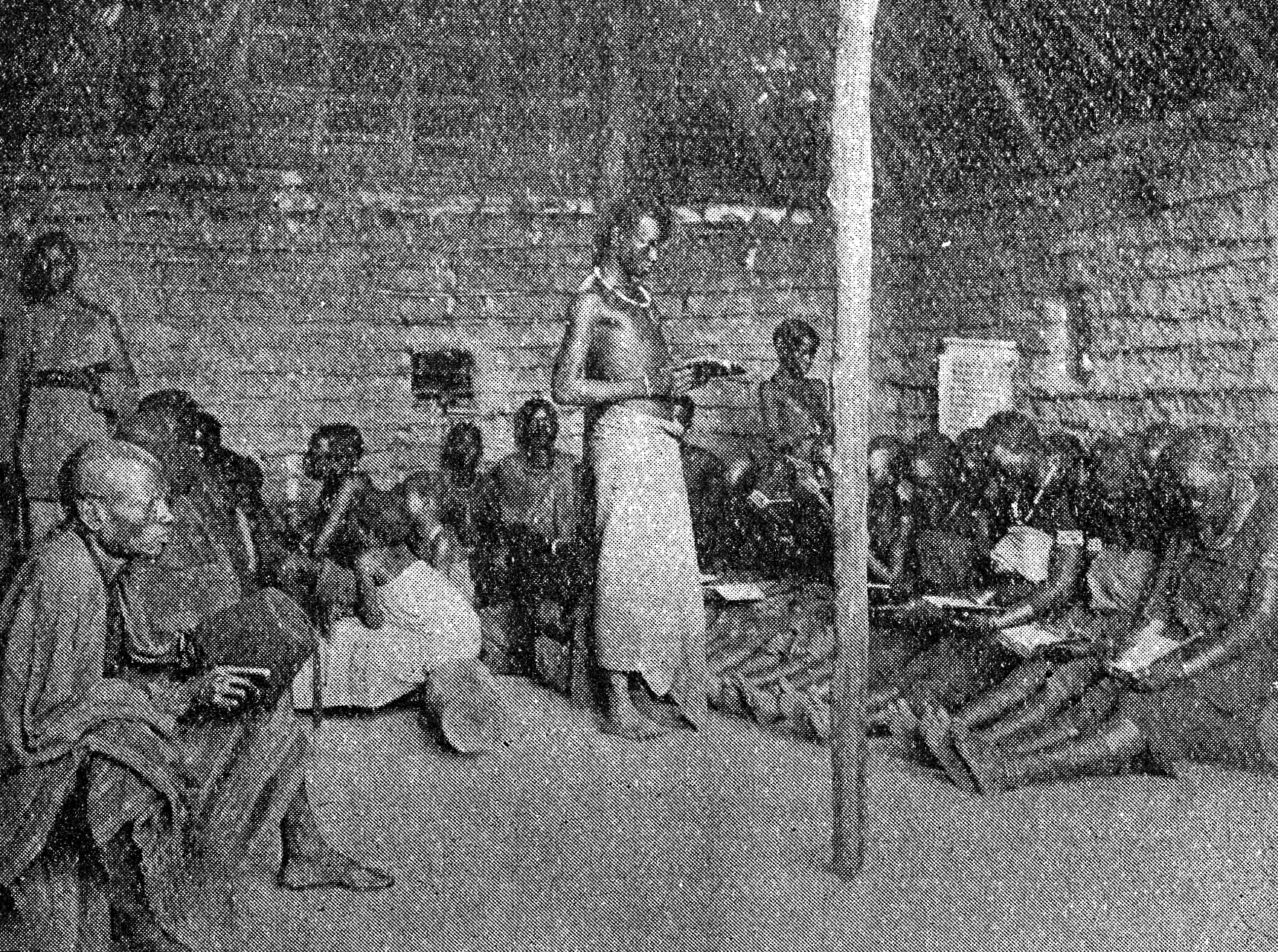
- Image of Digo People by the Mercy and Truth, A record of C.M.S. Medical Mission work early 20th Century.

Regions with significant populations
- Kenya: 409,595
- Tanzania: 100,000+

Languages
- Digo, Swahili and English

Religion
- Majority: Islam; Minority: African Traditional Religion and Christianity

Related ethnic groups
- Mijikenda, Kamba, and other Bantu peoples

- Person: Mdigoo
- People: Wadigo
- Language: Kidigo

The Digo (Wadigo in Swahili) are a Bantu ethnic and linguistic group based near the Indian Ocean coast between Mombasa in southern Kenya and northern Tanga in Tanzania. In 1994 the Digo population was estimated to total 305,000, with 217,000 ethnic Digo living in Kenya and 88,000 (1987 estimate) in Tanzania. Digo people, nearly all Muslims, speak the Digo language, called Chidigo by speakers, a Bantu language.

== Origins ==
The Mijikenda, whose name means "the nine kaya" or "nine cities," is made up of nine peoples, including the Digo. The Mijikenda share many cultural traits and speak mutually understandable languages. They made the decision to go by the name Mijikenda when they formed the cooperative political organization known as the Mijikenda Union in the late 1940s in coastal Kenya. The Digo have resided in the Kenyan coast's plains and hinterland ridges south of Mombasa and in Tanzania north of Tanga since the fifteenth and sixteenth century. The Digo in Tanzania are the native inhabitants of the Mkinga and Tanga districts of Tanga Region and are the major cultural group there.

== History ==
Until the early 20th century, the Digo maintained their prosperous trade with the nearby Swahili communities during the colonial era. Due to Zanzibar's rising economic stature and the Digo people's tight ties to Swahili towns in the second half of the nineteenth century, it was possible for individuals to amass riches and power, frequently through affiliations. The Digo had previously dominated trade between the shore and the interior, but they eventually lost it to the Swahili and Arabs who were part of the expanding Zanzibari Sultanate. Later, the potency of this economic dependence on Zanzibar was undermined by colonialism.

Due to constant famines caused by the British occupation, the practice of enslaving nieces or nephews by the Digo in exchange for food or payment was abolished at the start of World War One. The colonial government forbade the enslavement of minors throughout the first decade of the 20th century in an effort to dismantle debt networks and end slavery. Both the industry along the coast and the settlers in Kenya's highlands had a significant demand for labor. The colonial government implemented taxation and land access restrictions in order to produce a labor force that would be required to work for pay. The Digo were compelled to supply warriors to fight for Britain against Germany in neighboring Tanzania during the First World War.

Due to the Kenyan Digo's proximity to the Tanzanian border, the British put more pressure on them to provide labor for the war against the Germans. But even after the Digo acceded to these requests, the British refused to recognize a mjomba's ability to enlist his nephews in the military. They demanded the sending of sons rather than the nephews that their maternal uncles had sent. This demand actually and visibly altered the father's control over his kids.

Through Islam and colonization, the father took over the mjomba's responsibilities and authority, including childrearing, paying for marriage and divorce, and having the authority to give away children as desired. The colonial government significantly strengthened Islamic conceptions of family by giving the father authority that had previously only been given to the mjomba. This put into question men's duties and rights towards their sisters and offspring, which posed problems for Digo kinship systems as a whole.

Arguments over matrilineal and patrilineal inheritance, which are centered on proving one's affiliation with particular communities, reflect the shifting kinship relationships in inheritance patterns. As a result, the colonial attempt to regulate access to land as well as other components of Digo culture, such as individual power, upset ideas about kinship, law, and identity with ramifications for gender. The more individual conception of land and person under Islamic law was at variance with Digo concepts of clan land, in addition to altering authority within the family.

== Islam ==
The Digo are Muslim, unlike other Mijikenda peoples, and they have expressed and continue to express social continuity through ideas of matrilineal kinship and the persistence of matri-clans over time. There is only one group of named matri-clans among the Digo, known as fuko. The fuko plays a crucial part in defining people's identities and providing the idiom by which membership in Digo society is claimed or demonstrated. Digo people believe that paternal lineage links are important, despite the fact that maternal clan relationships are the most significant kinship ties. The Digo distinguish between the fuko, the family of the mother, and the mbari, the family of the father. Digo began converting to Islam in the early 19th century. Islam soon spread further among the Digo and the majority were Muslim by the 1940s. This process involved close economic contacts with coastal Muslim traders and the use of Muslim healers who also acted as religious teachers. The conversion of elders and other influential leaders in the community had a significant impact for the future spread of the religion among the Digo.

In the nineteenth century, children of both sexes typically did not inherit from their father but instead from their mother, grandmother, maternal uncles (mjomba), or their fuko. Instead, people acquired stakes in the land through use, clearance, and social ties that had developed over time with the land, such as debt (rahani), kinship, or patronage. These inheritance customs were also being fought at this time by systematic evasions of the matrilineal modes of inheritance.

For the Digo, British concerns about racial and ethnic segregation resulted in a paradoxical division of "native" and "Muslim." The Digo were viewed by the British as "natives" as opposed to "Muslims" since, as "natives," they were subject to the District Court and local Native councils, whereas the Muslims of the coastal area were governed by Muslim law and the Liwali and Mudirs. The terms "Muslim" and "native" didn't actually apply to any particular group of people or to how the law or the land were used. By using both categories in land disputes, this false division between "native" and "Muslim" offered a forum for dialogue and the challenge of colonial authority.

Although a small number of Digo people in the Kwale district and Swahili coastal cities along the coast have been Muslim for generations, the majority of Digo people only converted in the 1920s. Because of their habitational patterns, the Digo, unlike other Mijikenda, fully embraced Islam. Mijikenda converts who moved to Swahili towns rather than staying in the rural had formed a trend of urban Islamization. Digo Mijikenda converts, while, "south of Mombasa, beginning in the 1890s, remained resident in their home villages, while centering their social and religious life as Muslims in town."

During the final two decades of the nineteenth century, the population of Digo Muslims gradually expanded. While other Mijikenda peoples also converted to Islam, it was typically an individual decision that involved settling in Swahili communities. The Digo are still the only Mijikenda group that have a majority of Muslims. Digo society was profoundly impacted by conversion. Initially, the distinctions between Digo converts and non-converts were "mitigated by the fact that Muslims participated in Digo religious ceremonies and sacrifices at home and observed the communal practices of Islam away from home."

It became challenging to maintain this flexibility as mosques and Koranic schools erected in the Kwale district, as public acts of faith were now performed both at homes and among the faithful. Even the most fundamental components of daily life, such how people dress, eat, and conduct funerals, were altered by this process. Previously cordial family connections were torn apart by the rules concerning what to eat, with game and pig being the most essential options. Ideas about a person's nature and relationship with God underwent a profound shift. For instance, deformities, once seen to be the outcome of sin or to be evil in and of themselves, came to be understood as the diversity of God's creation.

In the 1920s, land was a significant factor in the conversion of the Digo people to Islam, particularly for the women. The majority of studies on Digo Islamization have focused on men and have discussed causes for conversion such as residential patterns, colonialism, resistance to colonialism, trade, and work. They have documented male conversion, presuming that female conversion had similar causes. These characteristics undoubtedly had an impact on women as well, but due to how differently they affected women, they did not have the same significance or effectiveness.

Women initially resisted conversion, and the District Commissioner Dundas even stated in 1920 that few Digo women were Muslim. However, the conversion of the Digo men would have a significant impact on the religion of the women. Wamahiu contends that because "women's conversion came largely through marriage" and was brought on by considerations of inheritance and status, women had more to lose materially. Many women are thought to have converted as men started applying Islamic law to inheritance disputes in order to secure their inheritance rights under this system, as these rights would have otherwise gone to the deceased person's closest Muslim relative.

These women were also protecting the rights of their offspring because Islamic law did not recognize marriages to non-Muslims and considered the offspring of such unions to be illegitimate and not eligible for inheritance. Officially, the child, niece, or nephew could not inherit if they were not Muslims. Both matrilineal and patrilineal systems of inheritance would be affected because the land would be given to the nearest Muslim relative. Due to the unequal number of conversions of men and women, the Chief Kadhi (an Islamic religious authority) decided to establish the right of inheritance for illegitimate Muslim children. A child ran the risk of not inheriting from either matrilineal or patrilineal Muslim male relatives if s/he was not considered Muslim.

Due to their involvement in Muslim society, women are now more economically dependent on men, especially their spouses. Within households, the roles of men and women shifted, giving husbands more responsibility for their wives and kids and giving wives less autonomy toward their husbands. The different types of marriage that Digo society has accepted and still recognizes serve as evidence of these developments in the family. Although there are three different types of marriage in Digo society—the "Digo wedding," the "Cattle Wedding," and the "Swahili or Muslim Wedding"—the majority of women are now wed in Muslim weddings.

Muslim marriages came to be seen as conferring the highest prestige on women while also placing the woman in a system of rights, freedoms, obligations, constraints, and reliance along the metropolitan coastal frontier. Following the conversion to Islam, Digo society developed new ideas of what it meant to have a status like to the nearby Islamic communities. In metropolitan parts of coastal Kenya, where Islam has long dominated society, Swahili Islam enjoys a position of power and luxury. Dress, non-agricultural work, leisure time, and financial dependence on spouses for married women were among the newly included conceptions of status.

In other parts of Kenya, urbanization and Christianization are also factors in the shift to economic dependence on spouses. In stratified civilizations with a history of slavery, status is particularly significant. Social memories of slavery and the stigma attached to having slave heritage serve to elevate status. Digo women's status is influenced by issues of class, which are reflected in ideals like having free time (rather than money in general), but specifically freedom from agricultural work.

The ability to afford new lesso (two cloth wraps, one worn as an outer skirt and the other as a head scarf or veil) twice a month as fashion changes is crucial as well because being in style is prestigious. Being able to perform social duties like attending weddings and funerals, regardless of the distance or amount of time required, is an important aspect of status. Because social obligations vary and take up a lot of time, status is gained by flexible working arrangements, not working, or depending on a husband or lover.

The majority of the kids were sold into slavery to nearby Swahili villages with nautical populations, giving them access to seafood. Famines were frequent during the British occupation, and other Mijikenda tribes also used this technique to alleviate them. Changes in marriage customs and the prominence of the father in Islam started to put the mjomba's authority under pressure. The rise in cases supporting patrilineal inheritance is a reflection of this change in marriage custom. The maternal uncle hasn't lost all of his significance or respect, either, as the mjomba still provides for fatherless children by paying the bridewealth.

== Kinship ==
These kin relationships are a regular feature of how people are arranged in social relationships with one another. When two Digo people first meet, the question "whose people are you?" is frequently posed. Either the mbari or the fuko are mentioned in the response to the query. Women are seen as crucial for continuity because men are considered dead ends in the fuko's propagation. According to the Digo, having daughters makes the fuko rich.

The family to which one belongs, Mbari, perhaps dates back only as far as grandfathers. It is a smaller unit than the fuko, which includes the founder of the fuko as well as all ancestors. However, unlike fuko, which is made up of all of your mothers' moms going all the way back, mbari is also primarily patrilineal and belongs to your grandpa. The distinction between fuko and mbari kinship, which affects membership and social continuity, is significant and frequently explained in terms of land inheritance.

Despite being a family conflict, inheritance creates social links and obligations that further the process of creating meanings. I contend that a sense of social continuity conveyed through the material continuity of the fuko links Digo's identity to the ownership of land. Beyond its material value, inheritance of property becomes the preferred manifestation of this social continuity when ownership of fuko land (clan land) is disputed. This is demonstrated by tracing the usage of inheritance as a crucial symbol of defining meanings of land and social interactions. Conflicts and arguments over inheritance represent conflicts of meaning and identity since they are significant both materially and symbolically.

== Agriculture ==
The Digo economy was based mostly on agriculture for a long time, despite the fact that the land itself was not particularly significant. The significance of the kaya was altered when the Digo were dispersed from kayas (towns and villages) to sub-kaya and eventually to individual homesteads in the coastal plains. They continued to serve as places for final dispute resolution as well as religious and ceremonial sites, but they lost some of their importance to Digo society. 16 In the coastal plains, agriculture was utilized, left fallow, and then utilized once again by various individuals, whereas coconut trees remained the exclusive property of particular people or clans.

One woman recalls farming in the colonial era in the Kwale district's Kinondo neighborhood as follows: The land belonged to everyone, and while there was no set pattern or method for planting trees, individuals were familiar with their particular species. Annual crops were sown in particular locations. The area where each individual had to plant was likened to two hands with their fingers extended wide. Every year until the land was deemed to have lost its fertility, this area was planted. The community then relocated to undeveloped land or land that had its fertility restored after being left fallow. Newly portioned rows were then connected to one another.

The people would move to a new location and live next to their current neighbors. They can encounter new neighbors when they return to the initial plot of land and work land that once belonged to someone else. It made no difference who had previously held the land. Men made the decision to emigrate to a new nation as a group. Nobody could make a choice. The assignment of plots was also done by men. The guys initially sought guidance from the divine to see whether there was a good omen before moving. After making their selection, they would travel to the kaya and offer sacrifices to the Spirits, let them know about it, and ask to God for favorable signs for the fields. They would pray to God and the spirits for blessings. The men would go and draw lines of demarcation before going to the sea and relaxing. Women carried with the farming chores.

The trees themselves, not the soil on which they were placed, were what mattered. It was remembered who owned certain coconut trees, but not who last planted fallow land. But with other shifting social and political interactions, land gradually became more significant than trees during the colonial period. In addition to clearing land becoming a sign of tenure and ownership becoming retainable after a fallow period, land gradually came to have some intrinsic worth that could be used for trade.

== Inheritance ==
In addition to dzumbe (father's land) and konho (mother's land), which are typically self-acquired properties, the Digo also acknowledge mashamba ya mafuko (clan farms, matrilineal) and mashamba ya mbari (lineage farms, patrilineal), which are inherited properties. These are the distinctions between these land holdings were that in the past, there were two different sorts of land ownership. If three brothers from the same mother walked out into the forest to clear it and build a farm (shamba). From the same fuko sprung these three brothers. Their sisters' side nieces and nephews, or the awa, would receive their inheritance. The fuko would own this territory. Since they weren't descended from that fuko, none of those three brothers' children would inherit.

If a guy traveled alone and cleared the forest to create a farm, that was the other sort of property ownership. He would clear the land, keeping a tiny bit for each of his wives and a portion for himself. He therefore owned a farm, and each wife was given a little plot of property.

The wife's land was known as konho, and the husband's land was known as dzumbe. Regarding their konho, women enjoyed total control and freedom. They had complete control over this property and could cultivate and harvest whatever they pleased. On the other hand, Dzumbe was completely under the husband's control. He would make all the decisions, but everyone would plant it together. The children of the wife received Konho as inheritance. The husband's nieces and nephews would receive dumbe. Husbands did not leave their wives any inheritance. Kinship ties to the land vary by gender (defined by clan membership) and with time (defined by the proximity of kin to the clan).

Despite the fact that males inherit their mother's fuko, their children do not and are not entitled to any of the clan's land (mashamba ya mafuko). When land associated with social kin relationships, such as fuko land, is held by women or is passed maternally from the mother's brother to the sister's children, it materially reproduces these social links.

A middle-aged Digo man named Kasim described how the land of his grandmother originally transferred maternally from his mother's brother to his sister's child before remaining in the control of the fuko women. Despite the fact that her mjomba had five boys, Kasim's grandmother had received land from her mother's brother. Despite the fact that she had two boys and one daughter, she then handed her land to her daughter's daughters. The family's ladies were therefore the ones who passed on the land.

The majority of scholarly research has argued that Digo inheritance is matrilineal and that historically, land only passed from the mother's brother to the sister's son. According to oral sources, judgment records, and past research, assessments of Digo land transmission focusing on men are deficient and do not fully depict the variety and size of Digo land holdings. The ownership of land was not solely communal or privately held prior to the colonial era.

In the nineteenth century, children of both sexes typically did not inherit from their father but instead from their mother, grandmother, maternal uncles (mjomba), or their fuko. Instead, people acquired stakes in the land through use, clearance, and social ties that had developed over time with the land, such as debt (rahani), kinship, or patronage. These inheritance customs were also being fought at this time by systematic evasions of the matrilineal modes of inheritance.

In the nineteenth century, children of both sexes typically did not inherit from their father but instead from their mother, grandmother, maternal uncles (mjomba), or their fuko. Instead, people acquired stakes in the land through use, clearance, and social ties that had developed over time with the land, such as debt (rahani), kinship, or patronage. These inheritance customs were also being fought at this time by systematic evasions of the matrilineal modes of inheritance.
