= Tanga Region =

Region of Tanzania

Tanga Mkoa wa Tanga (Swahili)
- Region
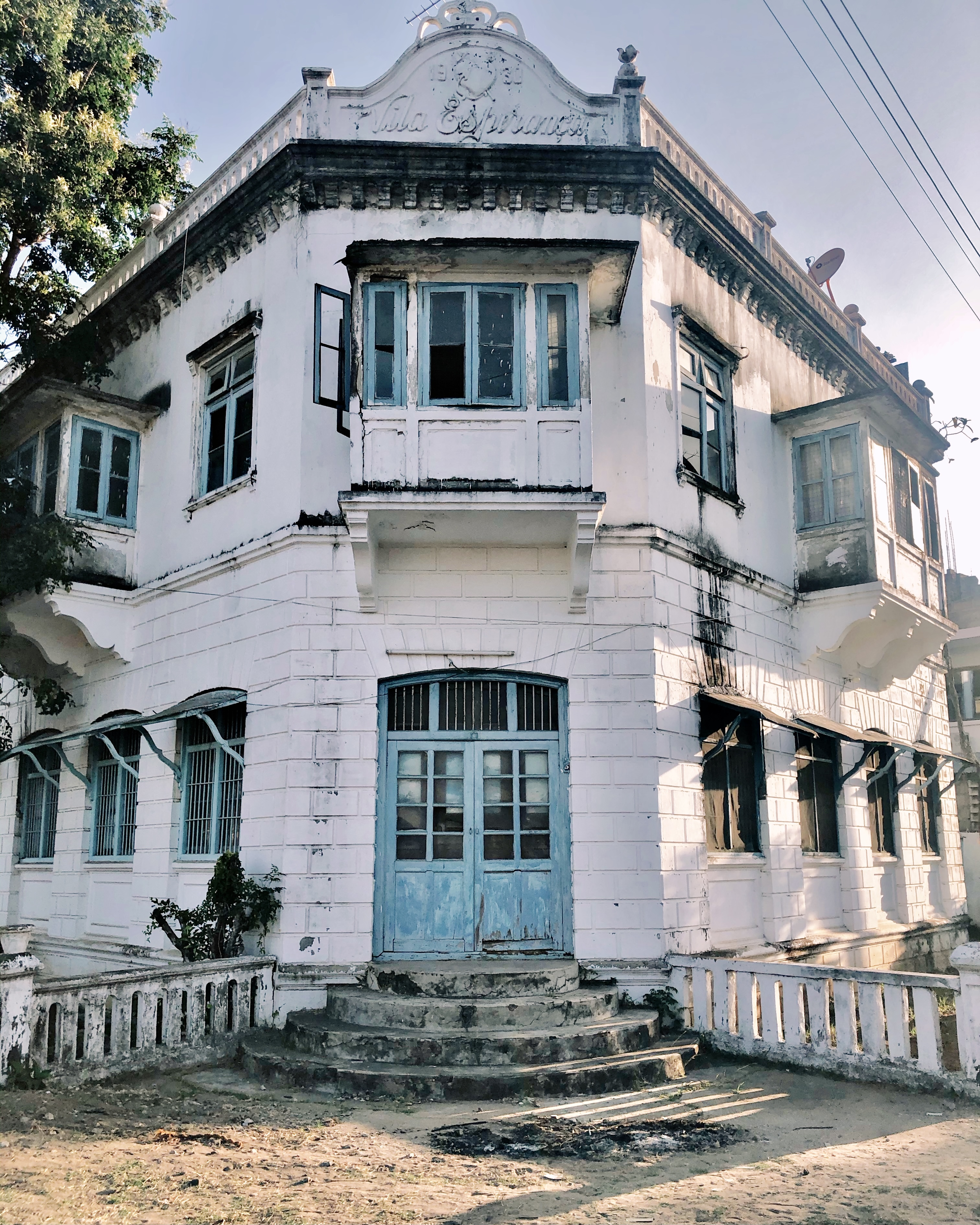
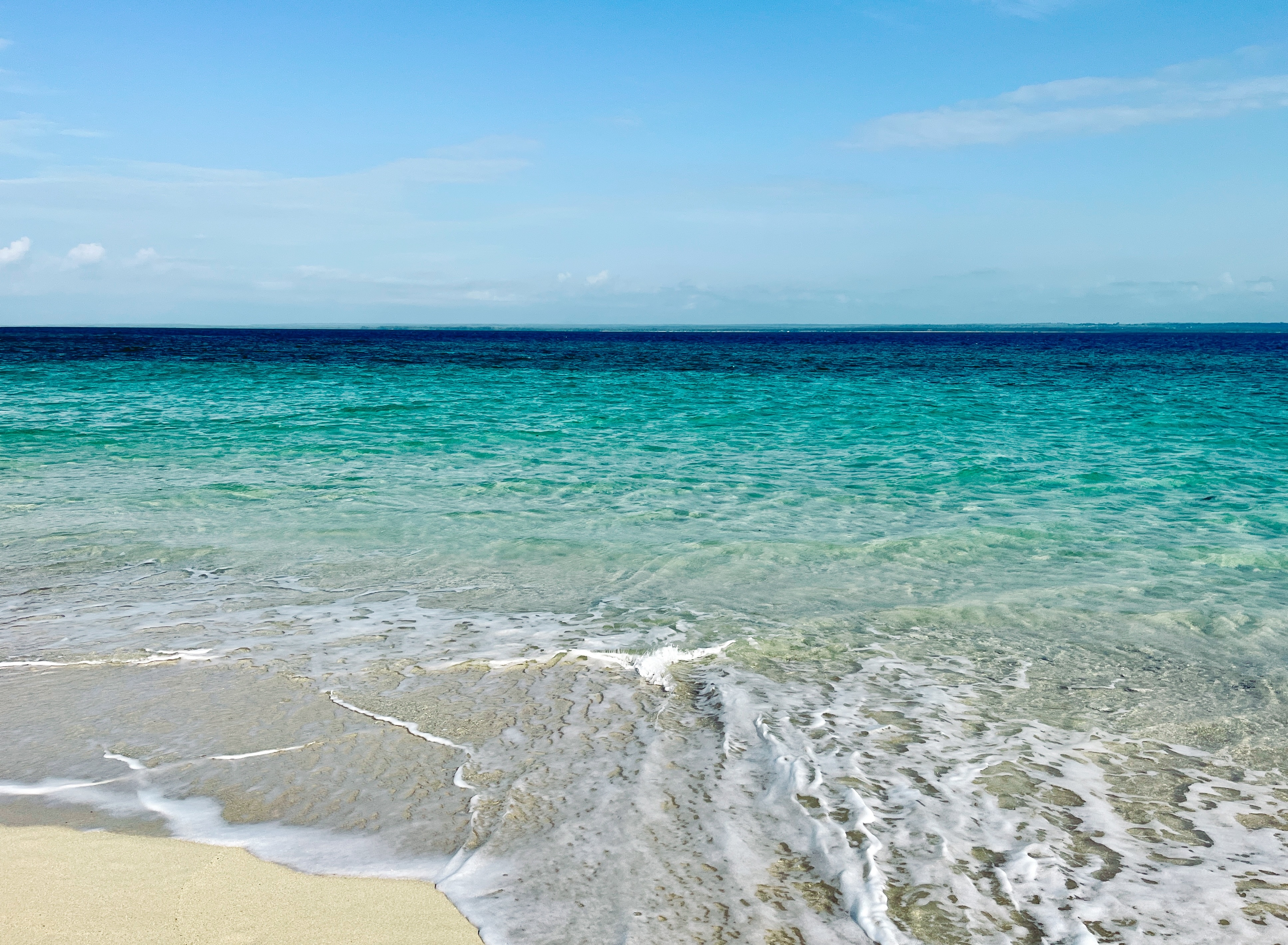
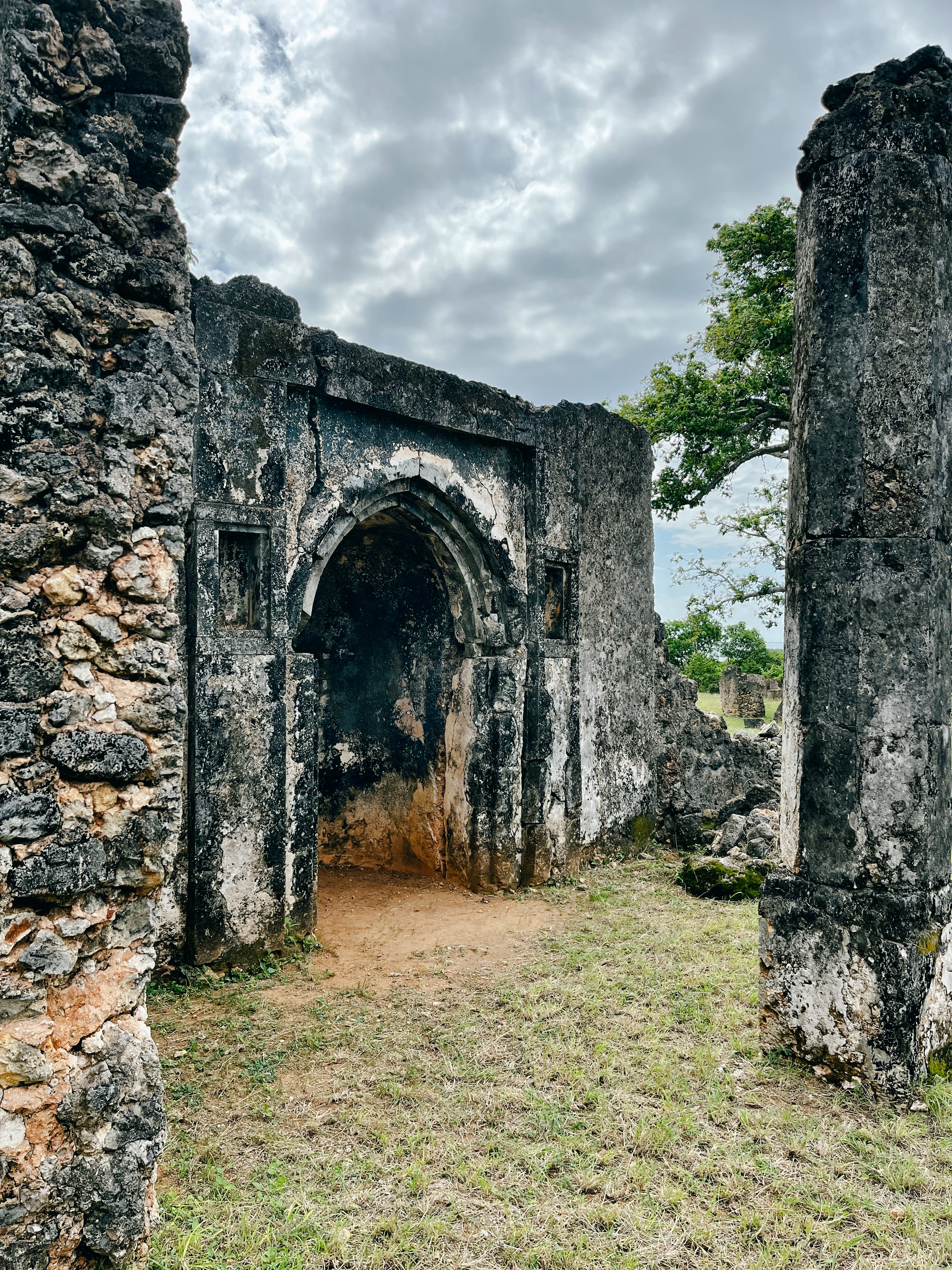
- From top to bottom: Building in Tanga District, Funguni Island of Pangani District and Tongoni Ruins
- Nicknames: Mini Tanzania; the love region
- Location in Tanzania
- Coordinates: 5°18′18″S 38°18′59.76″E
- Country: Tanzania
- Zone: Northern
- Named for: The port of Tanga
- Capital: Tanga
- Districts: List: Handeni District; Kilindi District; Korogwe District; Lushoto District; Muheza District; Mkinga District; Pangani District; Tanga District; Korogwe Urban District; Bumbuli District

Government
  - Regional Commissioner: Batilda Salha Burian

Area
  - Total: 26,677 km^{2} (10,300 sq mi)
  - Rank: 15th of 31
- Highest elevation (Chambolo Peak): 2,289 m (7,510 ft)

Population (2022)
  - Total: 2,615,597
  - Rank: 8th of 31
  - Density: 98.047/km^{2} (253.94/sq mi)
- Demonym: Tangan

Ethnic groups
  - Settler: Swahili
  - Native: Shambaa, Digo, Bondei, Segeju, Mbugu, Nguu, Dhaiso & Zigua
- Time zone: UTC+3 (EAT)
- Postcode: 21xxx
- Area code: 027
- ISO 3166 code: TZ-25
- HDI (2021): 0.569 medium · 8th of 25
- Website: Official website
- Symbols of Tanzania
- Bird: Usambara Weaver
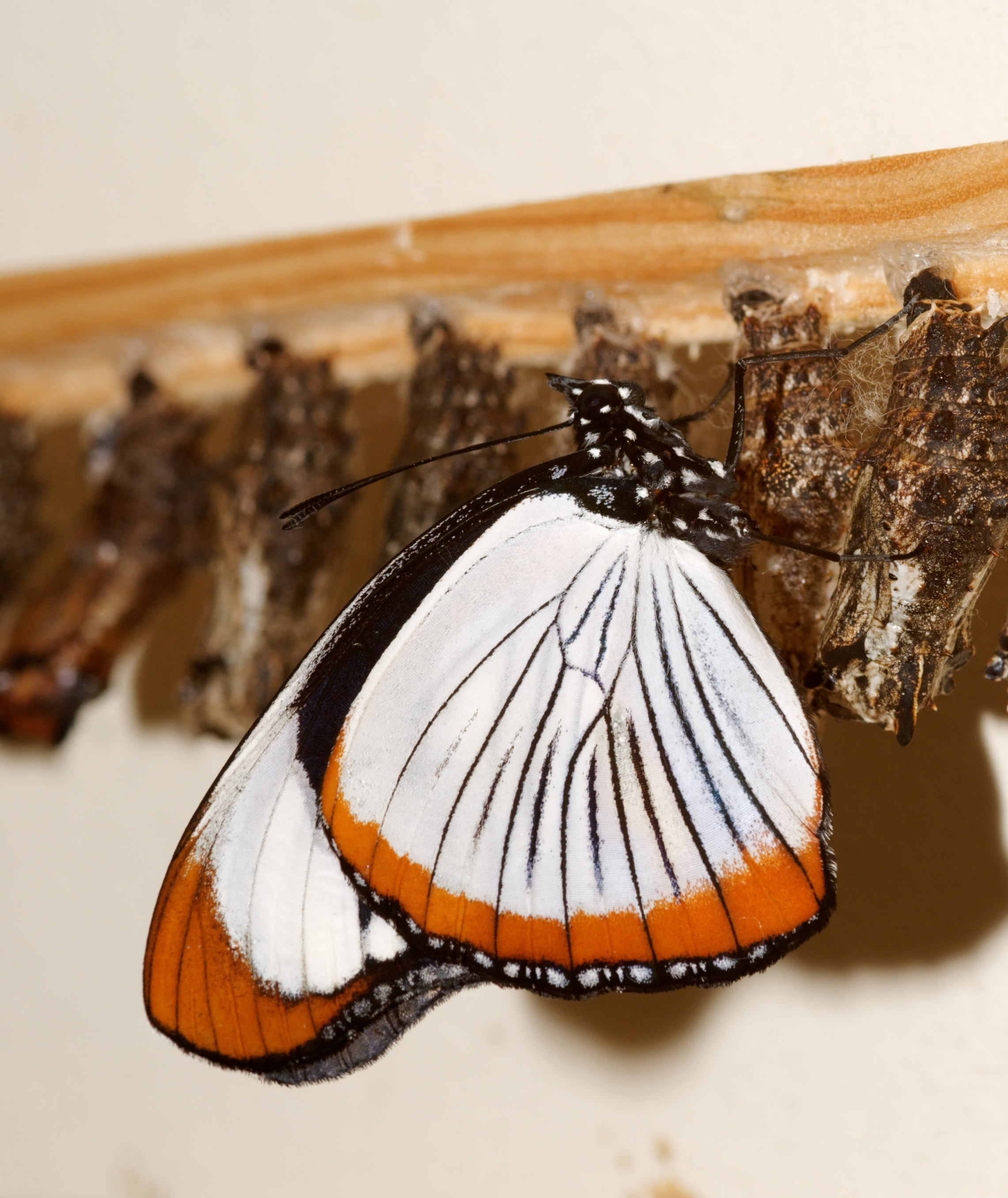
- Butterfly: Hypolimnas usambara

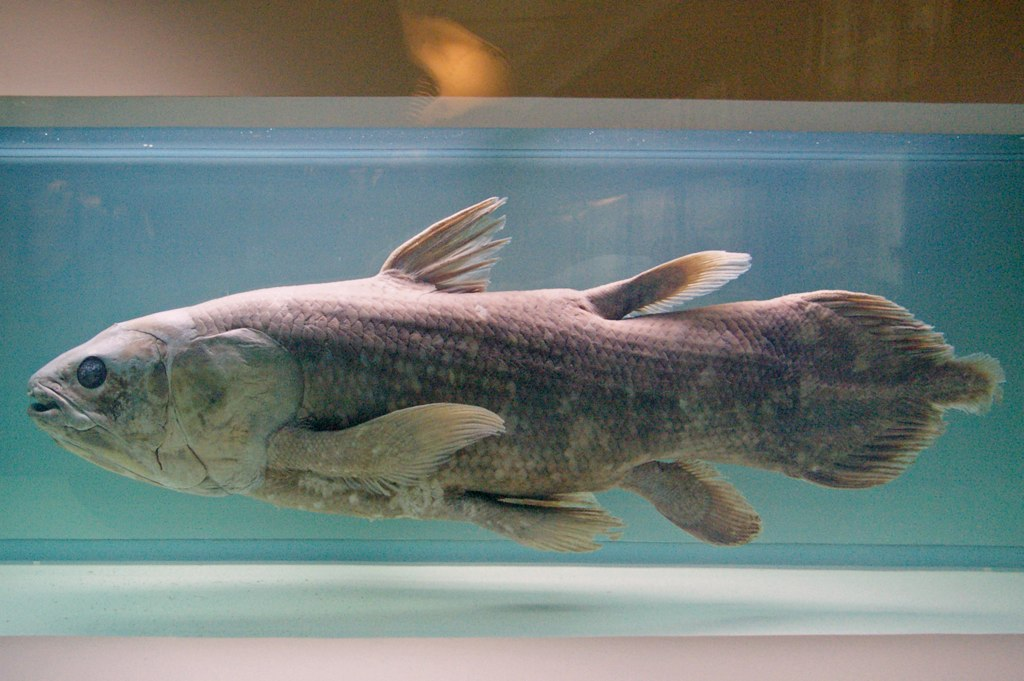
- Fish: African coelacanth

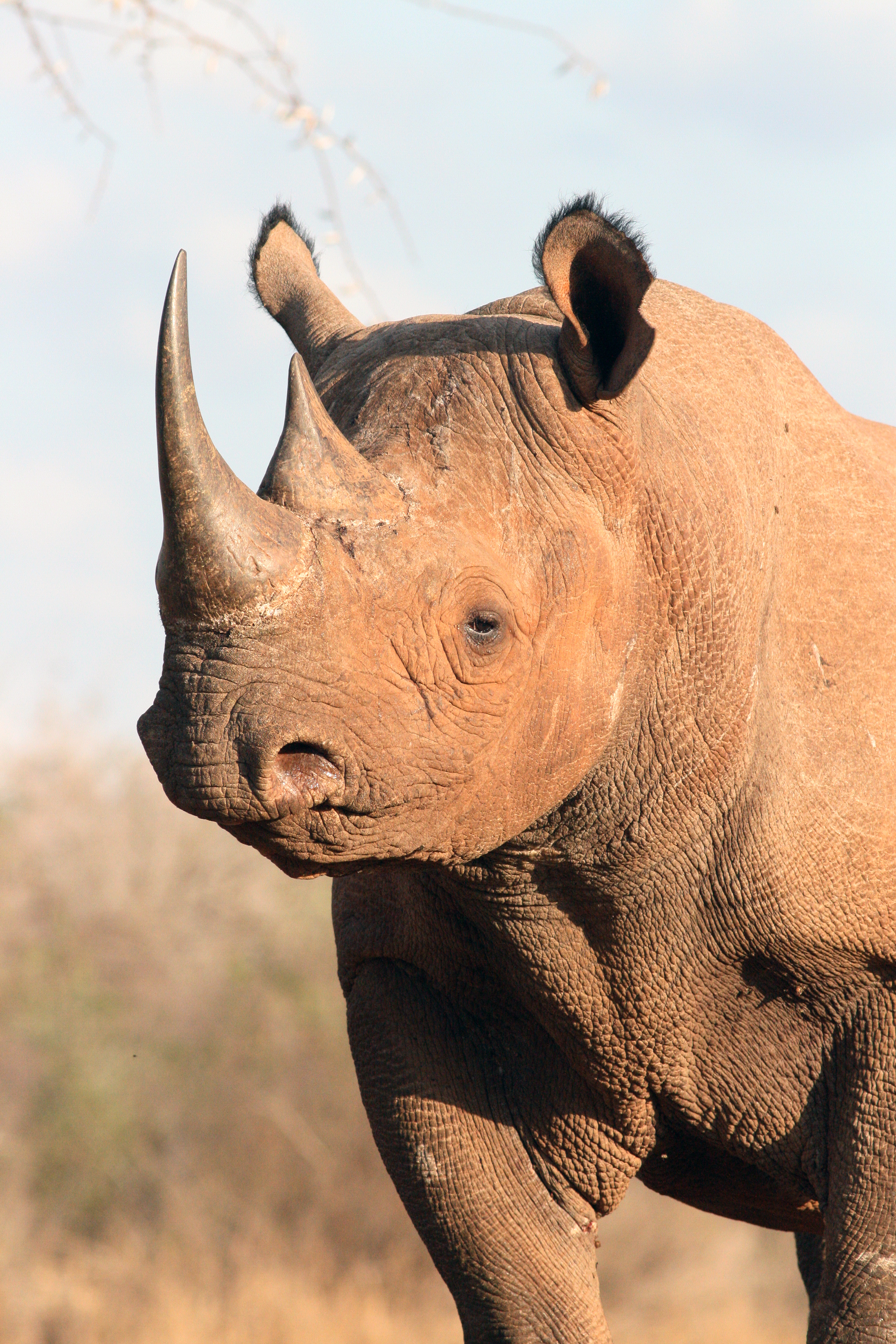
- Mammal: Black Rhino
- Tree: Ocotea usambarensis
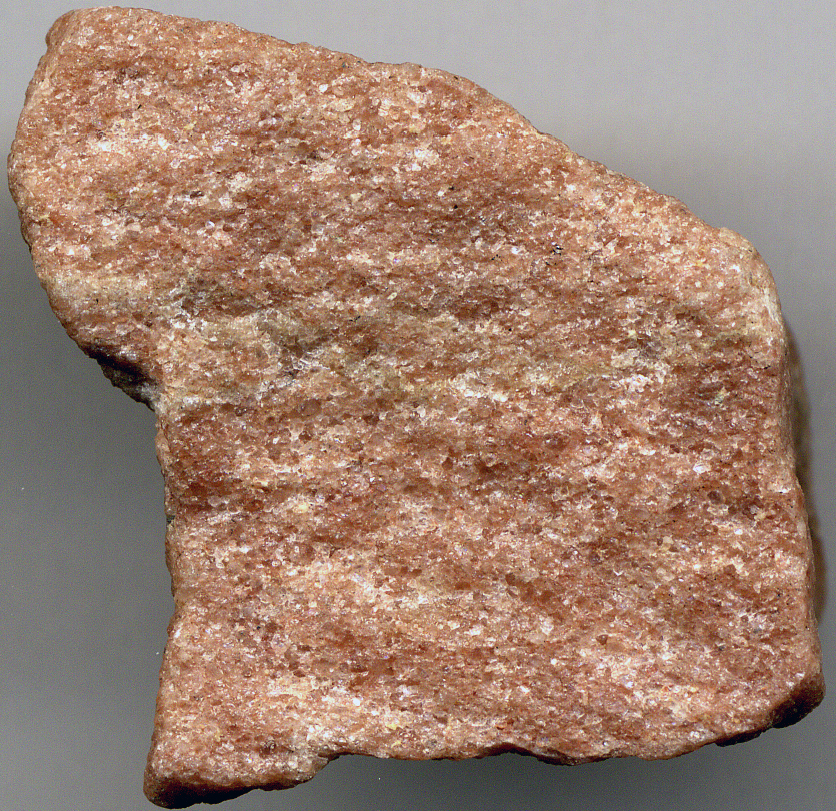
- Mineral: Quartzite

Tanga Region (Swahili: Mkoa wa Tanga) is one of Tanzania's 31 administrative regions. The region covers an area of 26,667 km^{2} (10,296 sq mi). The region is comparable in size to the combined land area of the nation state of Burundi. The regional capital is the municipality of Tanga city. Located in northeast Tanzania, the region is bordered by Kenya and Kilimanjaro Region to the north; Manyara Region to the west; and Morogoro and Pwani Regions to the south. It has a coastline to the east with the Indian Ocean. According to the 2022 national census, the region had a population of 2,615,597.

== History ==
The region was previously known as Tanga Province and included Same and Mwanga Districts that are at present in Kilimanjaro Region.

== Geography ==
=== Geology and terrain ===
Tanga Terrain Map

Tanga Region is the 15th largest region by size with an area of 26,667 km^{2} (10,296 sq mi), after Songwe Region at 27,656 km^{2} (10,678 sq mi). An area occupying 3% of the country. In comparison, Tanga is larger than the African nation of Burundi at 25,680 square kilometers. Tanga Region shares land borders with four other regions and three regions across the Pemba Channel namely; Pemba North Region, Pemba South Region and Zanzibar North. Tanga northwestern area is of high elevation, home to the Usambara Mountains with Tanga Region's highest point being Chambolo peak at 2,289 meters above sea level. The largest and longest river in Tanga Region is the Pangani River, fed by the Umkomazi River, Soni River and the Lwengera River. Tanga Region is located between 4 and 6 degrees south of the Equator. Another major river, the Mligasi River forms the southern border between Pwani Region and Tanga Region. Tanga Region is also home to largest cave system in East Africa, the Amboni Caves located a few kilometers north of Tanga city.

=== Flora and Fauna ===
Tanga is home to rich biodiversity of plants and animals. Tanga Region is home to two major national parks, Mkomazi National Park, shared with southern Kilimanjaro Region. The park is home to the endangered Black rhinoceros and the African wild dog. The second national park in Tanga Region is the Saadani National Park, The only national park in the country that shares an ocean coastline.

In the northwestern portion of the region is the Usambara mountains with the Amani Nature Reserve, home to the endemic fauna such as Amani Forest Tree Frog and Usambara torrent frog. In the forest, rare bird species like the Usambara eagle-owl, Usambara weaver, Usambara thrush and the Usambara double-collared sunbird are found. In addition, rare reptiles such as Usambara dwarf gecko, and endangered mammals such as the Usambara shrew are also found in the mountains. Just off the coast of Tanga is home to the Coelacanth. Tanga has one of the largest protected marine parks, Tanga Coelacanth Marine Park . The endangered Dugong is found off the coast in Mkinga District near Kirui Island.

=== Climate ===
Tanga Region has a tropical savanna climate with the Köppen climate classification of 49 and Aw. Western Tanga on the Handeni plateau is semi-arid and dry. Where are the Usambara mountains share a more temperate climate. Tanga Region receives annual precipitation level of 1,100 to 1,400 millimeters, often raining in April to May during the Wet season. Western Tanga Region gets less annual rainfall at 600mm annually, whilst some parts of the Usambara mountains receive up to 2,000mm annually. The average temperature range during the hot months of December to March is a high of 32 and a low of 26 degrees C. In comparison, the average temperature range during the cooler months of May to October is a high of 28 and a low of 20 degrees C.

== Demographics ==
=== Population ===
Tanga Region's population in 2012 was around 2,045,205. Lushoto District having the highest population of 492,441. Pangani District has the lowest population of 54,025. Tanga is home to around six major indigenous ethnic groups. It is the ancestral home to the Bondei people located on the central east coast of Tanga Region, the majority in Pangani district and Muheza District. Most of western Tanga is home to the Zigula people, the majority in Handeni District.

The Sambaa, the largest ethnic group in Tanga Region, are mostly found in the northern Tanga Region in the western Usambaras, Lushoto district, western Korogwe District and northern Muheza district. The Digo people and the Segeju people are a small minority within Mkinga District in the northeastern Tanga Region. Lastly the Ngulu people are native on the southwestern corner of Tanga Region's Kilindi District. Other smaller ethnic groups in Tanga Region include Mbugu and Pare people. More recently in history, immigrants from other parts of the country and abroad have found economic opportunities in Tanga Region, including Indians and Arabs.

Census	Population
1978	1,037,767
1988	1,280,212
2002	1,636,280
2012	2,045,205
2022	2,615,597

=== Religious communities ===
The majority of Tanga Region residents practice Sunni Islam with elements of African traditional faiths since the introduction of Islam to the Tangan coast through trade with the Swahili from the 9th and 10th centuries.

== Economy ==
=== Agriculture ===
Tanga is one of East Africa's largest agricultural producers, especially Citrus fruits. Agriculture is the biggest employer in Tanga Region. The coastal belt 0-15m above sea level covers most of Pangani district, a small coastal strip of Muheza district, Tanga and Mkinga districts. Crops grown in this Tanga coastal belt are coconuts, sisal, cashews, maize, cassava, rice and seaweed. Crops grown in the wet plains of Tanga are similar to the coastal belt minus the seaweed, but include cotton.

== Administrative divisions ==
=== Districts ===
Tanga Region is divided into eleven districts, each administered by a council:

Districts of Tanga Region
Map	District	Population (2012 Census)	Population (2022 Census)
	Handeni District	276,646	384,353
	Handeni Town	79,056	108,968
	Kilindi District	236,833	398,391
	Korogwe District	242,038	272,870
	Korogwe Town	68,308	86,551
	Lushoto District	332,436	350,958
	Muheza District	204,461	238,260
	Mkinga District	118,065	146,802
	Pangani District	54,025	75,642
	Tanga City	273,332	393,429
	Bumbuli District	160,005	159,373
Total		2,045,205	2,615,597

== Notable people ==
- George Kinyonga, musician
- Bill Nass, musician
- John Kijazi, Tanzanian politician
- Mbegha, 19th Century Sambaa King.
- Kimweri ye Nyumbai, 19th Century Sambaa King.
- Kimweri Mputa Magogo, Last Shambaa King of the Kilindi dynasty.
- Shabaan bin Robert, National Poet of Tanzania.
- Kleist Sykes, Political activist, one of the founding fathers of Tanganyika.
- Abdi Banda, Tanzanian football player.
- Sudhar Bhuchar, British actor.
- Ronald V. Clarke, British criminologist
- Gadiel Kamagi, Tanzanian football player
- Bashir Khanbhai, British politician
- Rashid Matumla, Tanzanian boxer
- Michael Riegels, British barrister
- Hassan Mwakinyo, Tanzanian boxer
