= Pangani Mashariki =

Ward in Pangani District, Tanga Region

Pangani Mashariki Ward Kata ya Pangani mashariki (Swahili)
- Ward
- Kata ya Pangani Mashariki, Wilaya ya Pangani
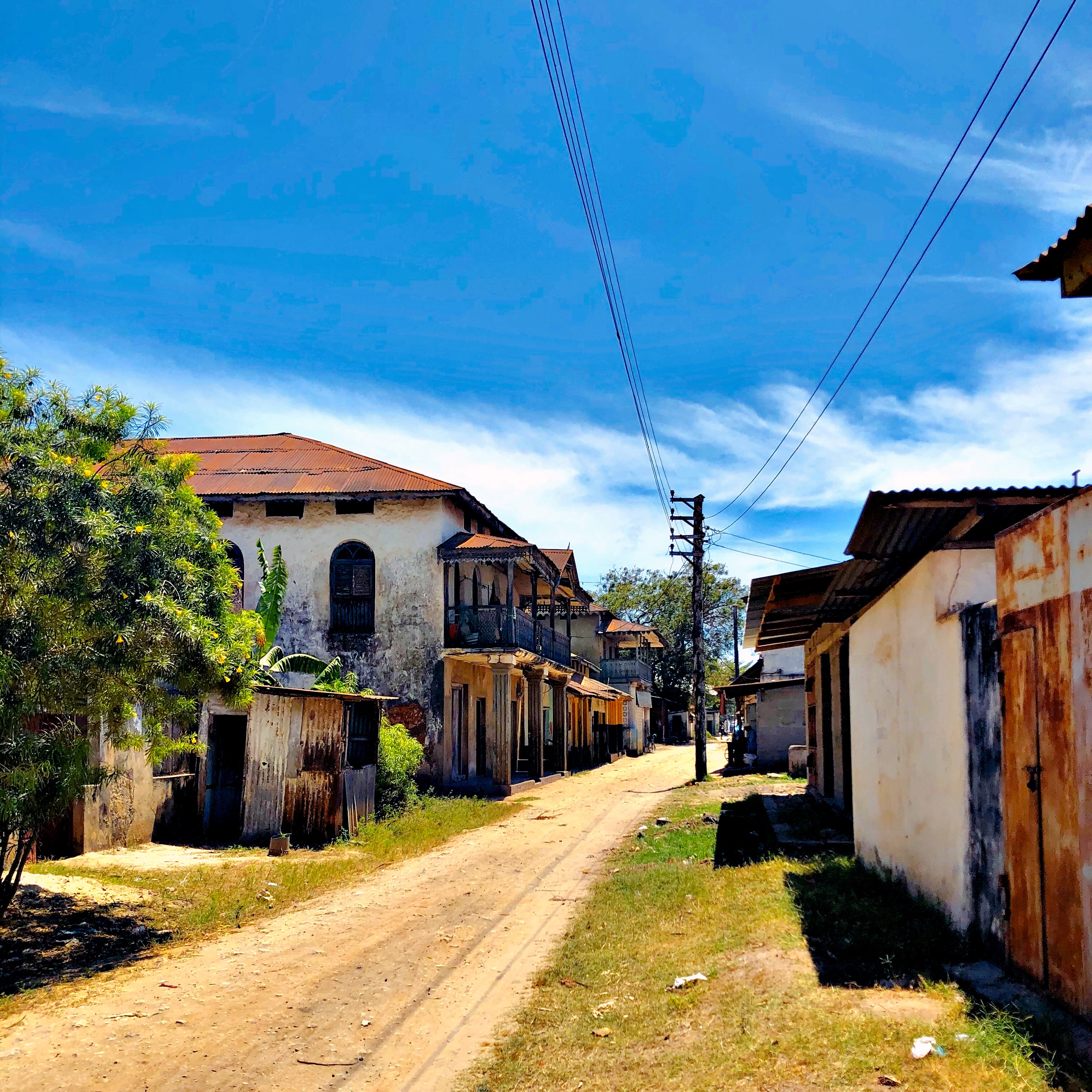
- Street scene in Pangani Mashariki

- Location within Tanzania
- Country: Tanzania
- Region: Tanga Region
- District: Pangani District
- Capital: Kanarani

Area
  - Total: 5.3 km^{2} (2.0 sq mi)
- Elevation: 37 m (121 ft)

Population (2012)
  - Total: 2,975
  - Density: 560/km^{2} (1,500/sq mi)

Ethnic groups
  - Settler: Swahili, Makonde, Bena, Arab and Indian
  - Ancestral: Bondei & Zigua
- Tanzanian Postal Code: 21301

Pangani Mashariki is an administrative ward in Pangani District of Tanga Region in Tanzania. The ward cover the eastern part of Pangani Town. The ward is also the seat of the district capital, with the district council building located in the north of the ward. Pangani mashariki is one of 13 wards in Pangani District as of 2012. The ward covers an area of 13 km^{2} (5.0 sq mi), and has an average elevation of 37 m (121 ft).

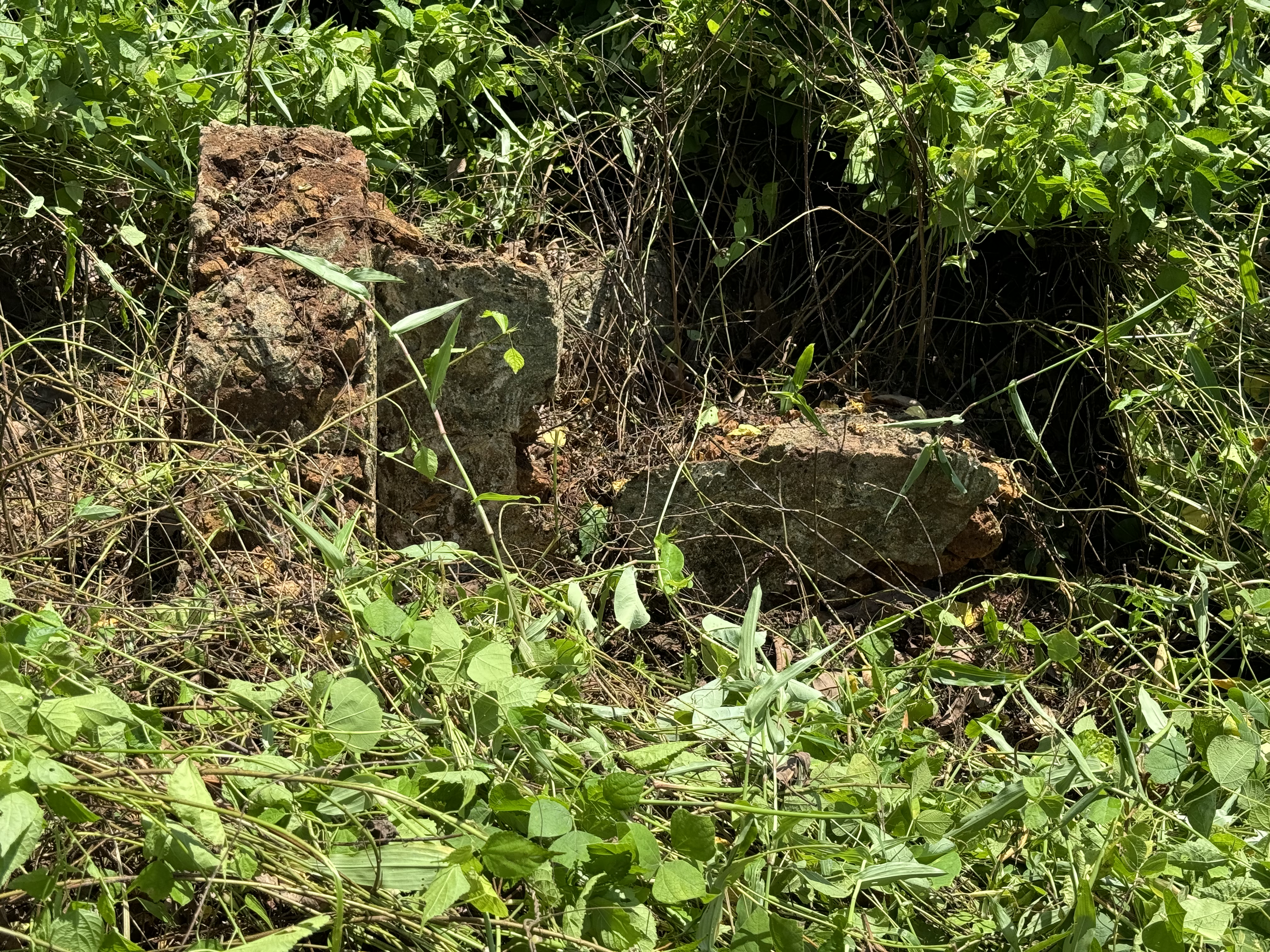
Grave at Historic Muhembo ruins, Pangani DC, Tanga Region

The ward is bordered by Pangani Magharibi to the west, Kimang'a ward to the north and Bweni ward across the mouth of Pangani River. The wards also slightly touches the border of Madanga ward to the north west. The ward is home to Muhembo, a National Historic Site. According to the 2012 census, the ward has a total population of 2,975.

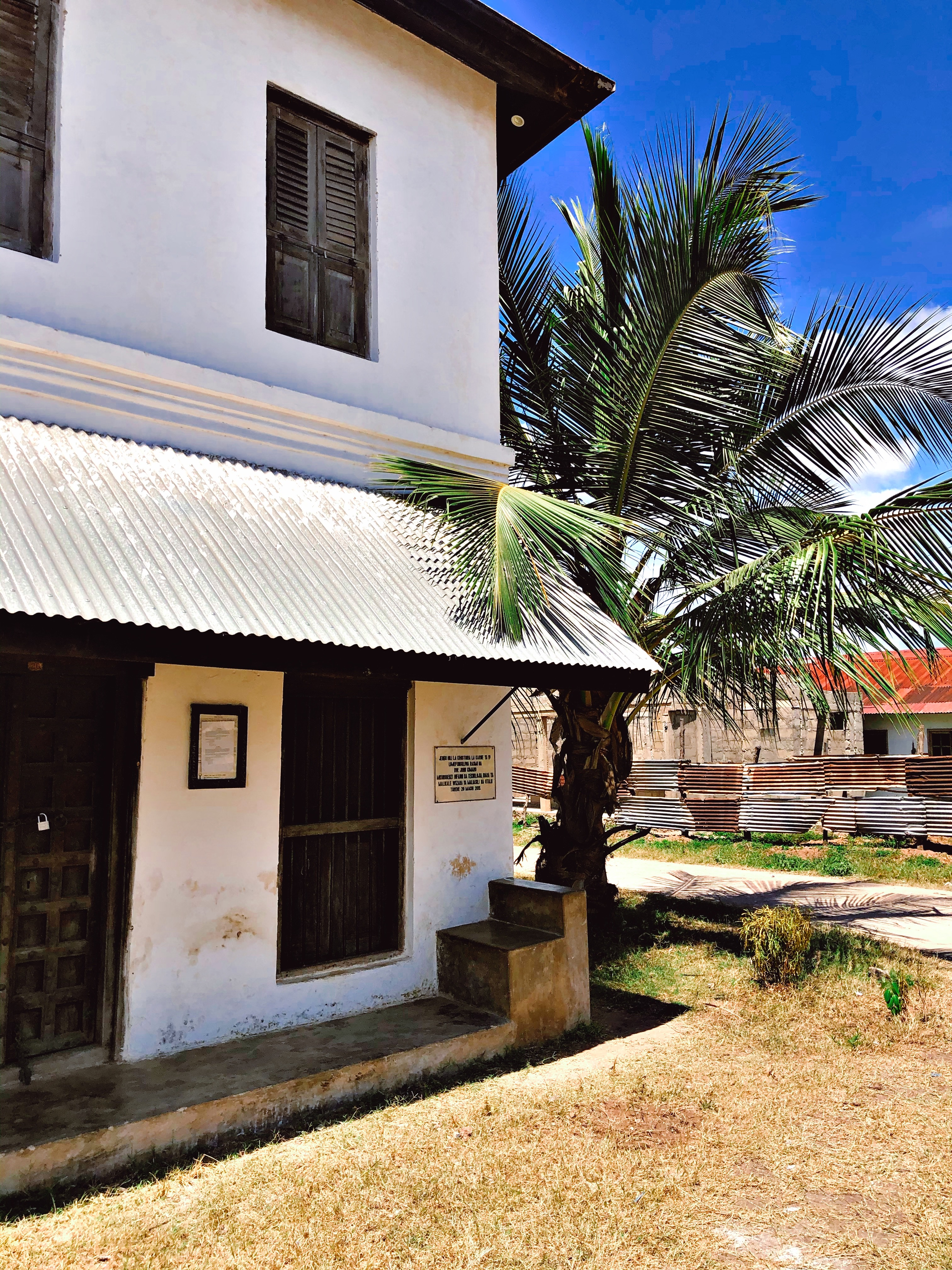
Old Swahili House in Pangani Mashariki Ward

== Economy ==
The ward is the commercial center of the Pangani district. Pangani Mashariki contains the administrative Buildings of both the town of Pangani and the district. Additionally, the ward faces the Zanzibar channel in the Indian Ocean. The ward is home to a number of hotels and also the district's Friday Mosque. The Market is also located in the Sokoni neighborhood of Pangani Mashariki and the Pangani bus terminal which serves the entire district.

== Administration and neighborhoods ==
The postal code for Pangani mashariki is 21301. Pangani Mashariki is divided into three neighborhoods:

- Kanarani, Pangani Mashariki
- Kumba, Pangani Mashariki
- Sokoni, Pangani Mashariki

== Education ==
Pangani Mashariki ward is home to a number of schools:

- Istiqama Nursery School
- Funguni Secondary School

== Healthcare ==
Pangani Mashariki is home to the following health centers:

- Pangani District Hospital
