= Kigombe =

Ward in Tanga Region, Tanzania

Kigombe Kata ya Kigombe (Swahili)
- Ward of Muheza District
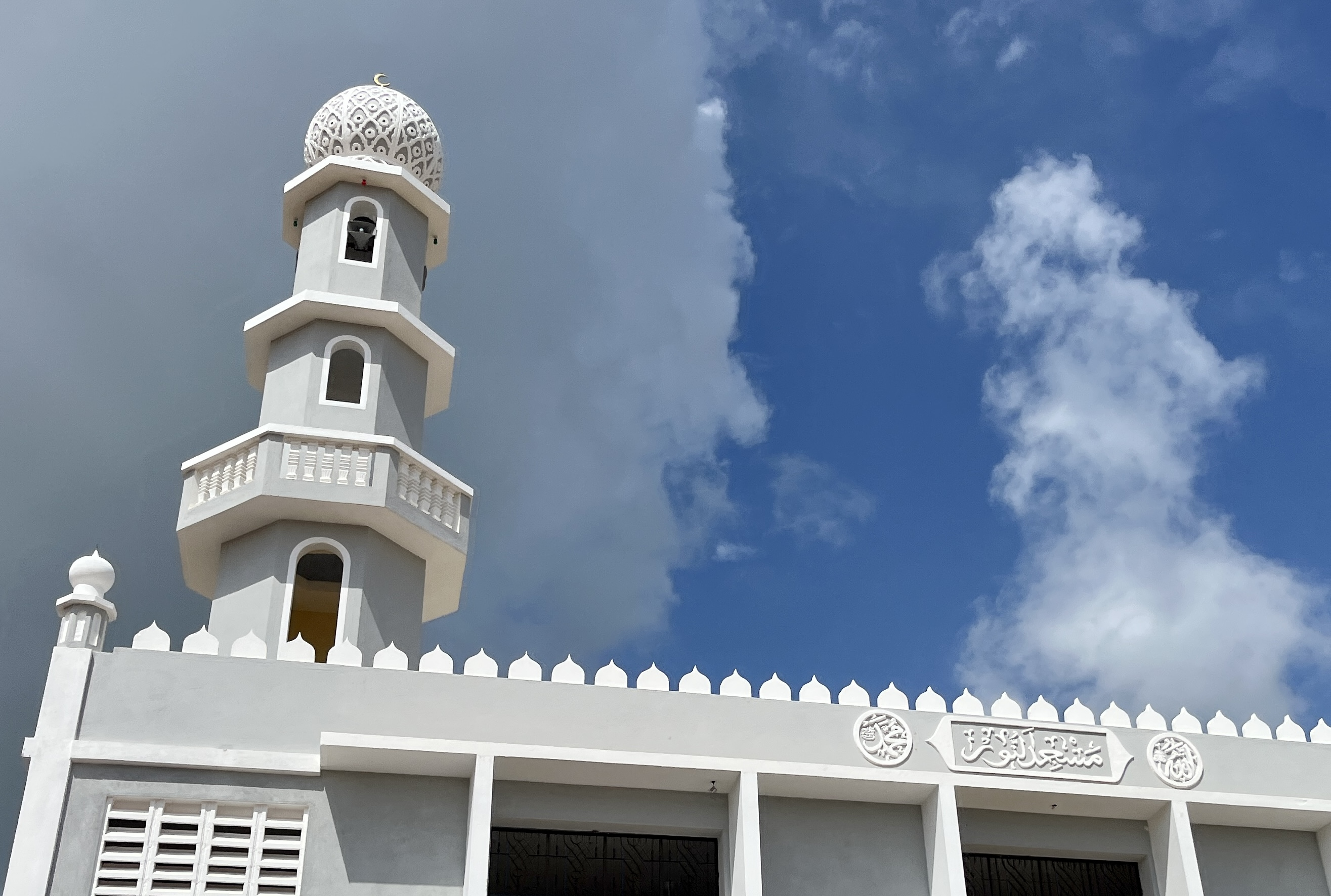
- From top to bottom: The Mosque of Kigombe
- Interactive map of Kigombe
- Coordinates: 5°17′41.64″S 39°3′39.96″E
- Country: Tanzania
- Region: Tanga Region
- District: Muheza District

Area
  - Total: 110.7 km^{2} (42.7 sq mi)

Population (2012)
  - Total: 5,678

Ethnic groups
  - Settler: Swahili
  - Ancestral: Bondei
- Tanzanian Postal Code: 21418

Kigombe (Kata ya Kigombe, in Swahili) is an administrative ward in Muheza District of Tanga Region in Tanzania. Tanga's Kirare and Tongoni wards border the ward on its northern side. The Pemba Channel is located to the east. Kimang'a, Madanga, and Bushiri of Pangani are to the south. Mpapayu and Ngomeni wards are to the west. The ward covers an area of 110.7 km^{2} (42.7 sq mi), According to the 2012 census, the ward has a total population of 6,758.

== Administration ==
The postal code for Kigombe Ward is 21418. The ward is divided into the following neighborhoods (Mitaa):

- Chaka la Boko
- Gawani
- Kigombe
- Kigombe Mgaharibi
- Kigombe Mashariki
- Machimboni

- Mchangani
- Mibuyu Tisa
- Mtiti
- Ndonde
- Sinawe

=== Government ===
The ward, like every other ward in the country, has local government offices based on the population served.The Kigombe Ward administration building houses a court as per the Ward Tribunal Act of 1988, including other vital departments for the administration the ward. The ward has the following administration offices:

- Kigombe Police Station
- Kigombe Government Office (Afisa Mtendaji)
- Kigombe Tribunal (Baraza La Kata) is a Department inside Ward Government Office

In the local government system of Tanzania, the ward is the smallest democratic unit. Each ward is composed of a committee of eight elected council members which include a chairperson, one salaried officer (with no voting rights), and an executive officer. One-third of seats are reserved for women councillors.

== Demographics ==
Like much of the district, the ward is the ancestral home of the Bondei people.

== Education and health ==
=== Education ===
The ward is home to these educational institutions:

- Kigombe Primary School
- Kigombe Bago Primary School
- Kigombe Secondary School

=== Healthcare ===
The ward is home to the following health institutions:

- Kigombe Health Center
- Bago Health Center
