= Zigua =

Zigua may refer to:

- Zigua people, ethnic group in Tanzania
- Zigua language, their language
