= Pangani (disambiguation) =

Pangani is a town in Tanzania.

Pangani may also refer to:

- Pangani A
- Pangani (ward)
- Pangani, Nairobi, a neighbourhood in Kenya.
