= Mwera =

Mwera can refer to several things related to Tanzania:

- Mwera people, an ethnic and linguistic group
- Mwera language
- Mwera, Zanzibar, a village on Unguja Island, Zanzibar
- Mwera (ward)
