= Tungamaa =

Ward in Pangani District, Tanga Region

Tungamaa Kata ya Tungamaa (Swahili)
- Ward
- Kata ya Tungamaa, Wilaya ya Pangani
- Location within Tanzania
- Country: Tanzania
- Region: Tanga Region
- District: Pangani District

Area
  - Total: 133 km^{2} (51 sq mi)
- Elevation: 37 m (121 ft)

Population (2012)
  - Total: 2,583
  - Density: 19.4/km^{2} (50.3/sq mi)

Ethnic groups
  - Settler: Swahili
  - Ancestral: Zigua
- Tanzanian Postal Code: 21310

Tungamaa is an administrative ward in Pangani District of Tanga Region in Tanzania. The ward covers an area of 133 km^{2} (51 sq mi). According to the 2012 census, the ward has a total population of 2,583.
