= Kipumbwi =

Ward in Pangani District, Tanga Region

Kipumbwi Kata ya Kipumbwi (Swahili)
- Ward
- Kata ya Kipumbwi, Wilaya ya Pangani
- Location within Tanzania
- Country: Tanzania
- Region: Tanga Region
- District: Pangani District

Area
  - Total: 235 km^{2} (91 sq mi)
- Elevation: 23 m (75 ft)

Population (2012)
  - Total: 5,333
  - Density: 22.7/km^{2} (58.8/sq mi)

Ethnic groups
  - Settler: Swahili & Maasai
  - Ancestral: Zigua
- Tanzanian Postal Code: 21311

Kipumbwi is an administrative ward in Pangani District of Tanga Region in Tanzania. The ward covers an area of 235 km^{2} (91 sq mi), and has an average elevation of 23 m (75 ft). According to the 2012 census, the ward has a total population of 5,333. Kipumbwi is named after a Medieval Swahili city state on the coast of Kipumbwi ward.

== See also ==
- List of Swahili settlements of the East African coast
