= Mkwaja =

Ward in Pangani District, Tanga Region

Mkwaja Kata ya Mkwaja (Swahili)
- Ward
- Kata ya Mkwaja, Wilaya ya Pangani
- Location within Tanzania
- Country: Tanzania
- Region: Tanga Region
- District: Pangani District

Area
  - Total: 408 km^{2} (158 sq mi)
- Elevation: 37 m (121 ft)

Population (2012)
  - Total: 4,217
  - Density: 10.3/km^{2} (26.8/sq mi)

Ethnic groups
  - Settler: Swahili
  - Ancestral: Zigua
- Tanzanian Postal Code: 21312

Mkwaja is an administrative ward in Pangani District of Tanga Region in Tanzania. The ward covers an area of 408 km^{2} (158 sq mi), and has an average elevation of 37 m (121 ft). According to the 2012 census, the ward has a total population of 4,217. The name Mkwaja is derived after a Medieval Swahili city state on the coast of Mkwaja ward.

== See also ==
- List of Swahili settlements of the East African coast
