= Mikinguni =

Ward in Pangani District, Tanga Region

Mikinguni Kata ya Mikinguni (Swahili)
- Ward
- Kata ya Mikinguni, Wilaya ya Pangani
- Location within Tanzania
- Country: Tanzania
- Region: Tanga Region
- District: Pangani District

Area
  - Total: 153.4 km^{2} (59.2 sq mi)
- Elevation: 60 m (200 ft)

Population (2012)
  - Total: 4,646
  - Density: 30.29/km^{2} (78.44/sq mi)

Ethnic groups
  - Settler: Swahili
  - Ancestral: Zigua
- Tanzanian Postal Code: 21309

Mikinguni is an administrative ward in Pangani District of Tanga Region in Tanzania. The ward covers an area of 153.4 km^{2} (59.2 sq mi), and has an average elevation of 60 m (200 ft). According to the 2012 census, the ward has a total population of 4,646.
