= Pangani =

Historic town of Pangani District, Tanga Region

Pangani Mji wa Pangani (Swahili)
- Capital of Pangani District
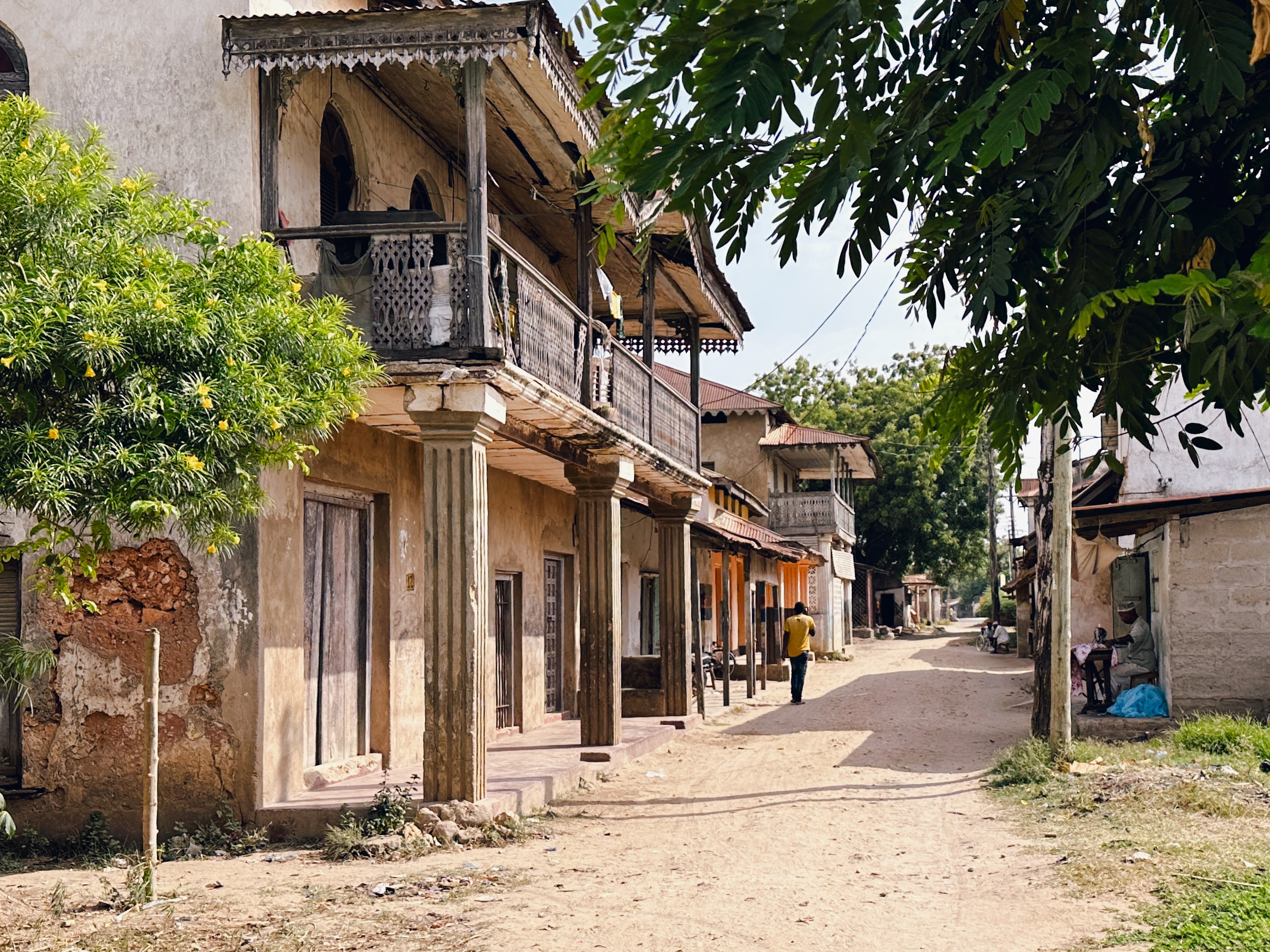
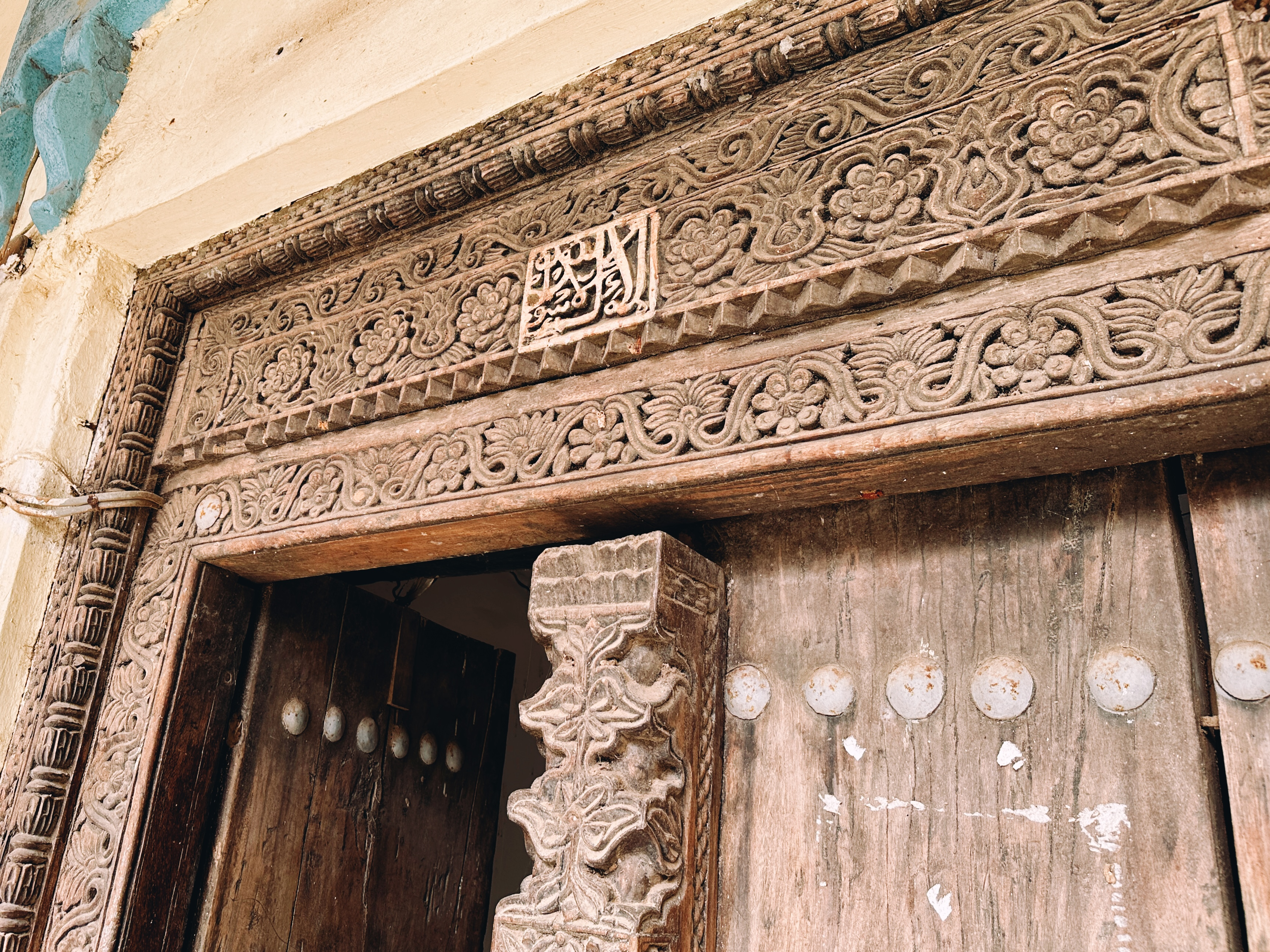
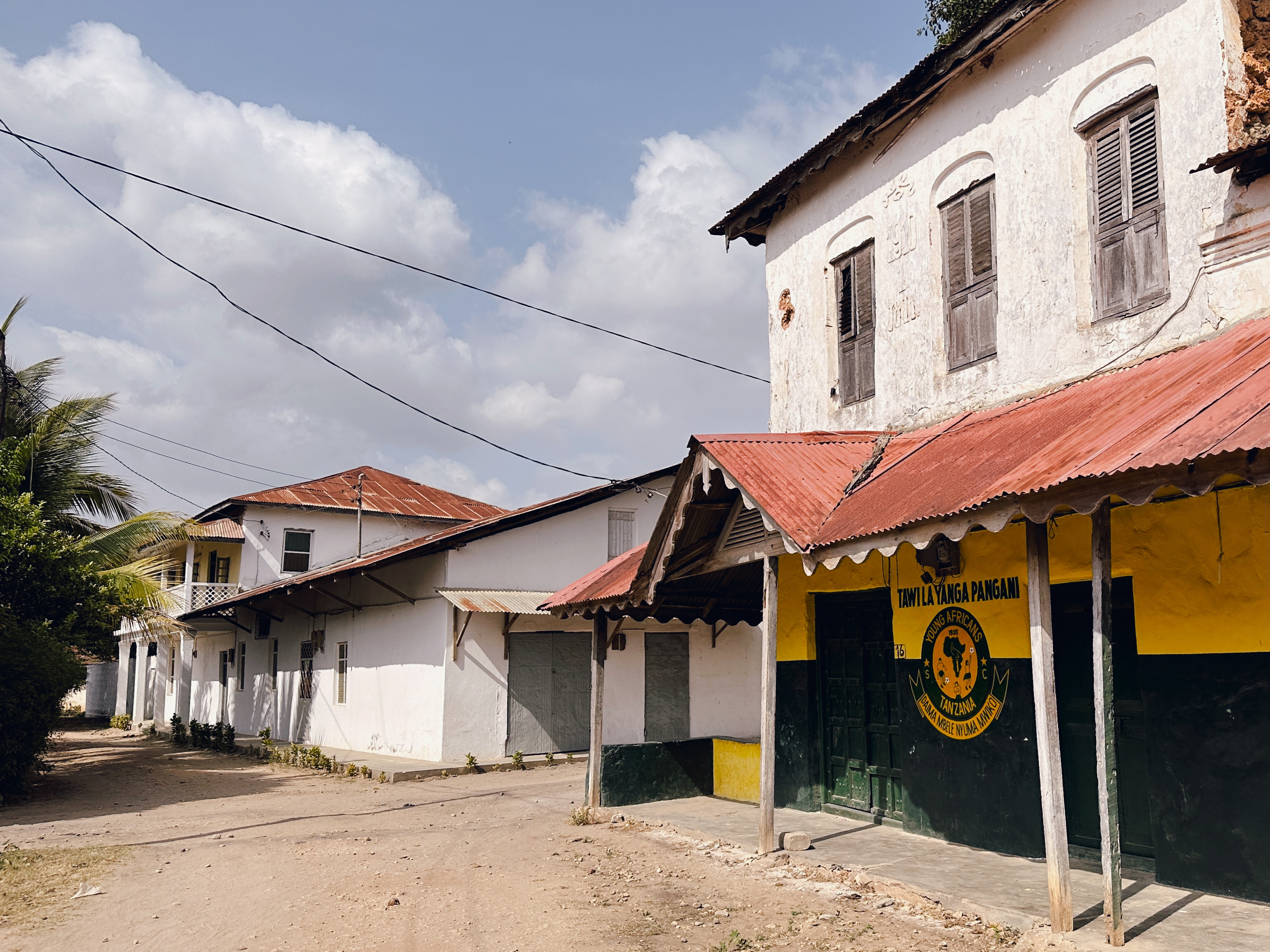
- From top to bottom: Historic street in Pangani, Swahili door in Pangani and another street in Pangani town
- Nickname: The pearl of Tanzania
- Location within Tanzania
- Coordinates: 5°24′0″S 38°59′0″E
- Country: Tanzania
- Region: Tanga Region
- District: Pangani District

Ethnic groups
  - Settler: Swahili
  - Ancestral: Bondei

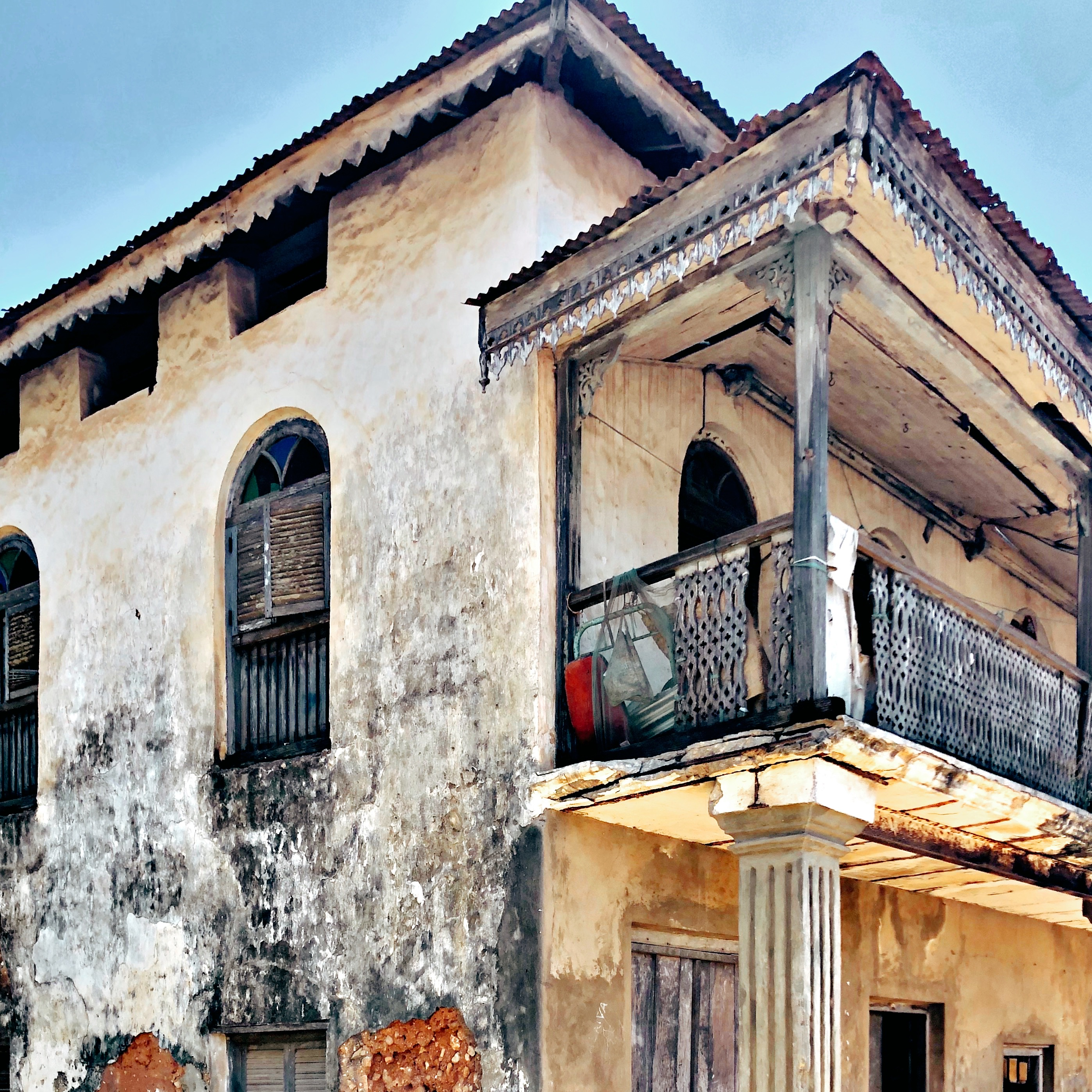
Swahili house detail in Historic Pangani

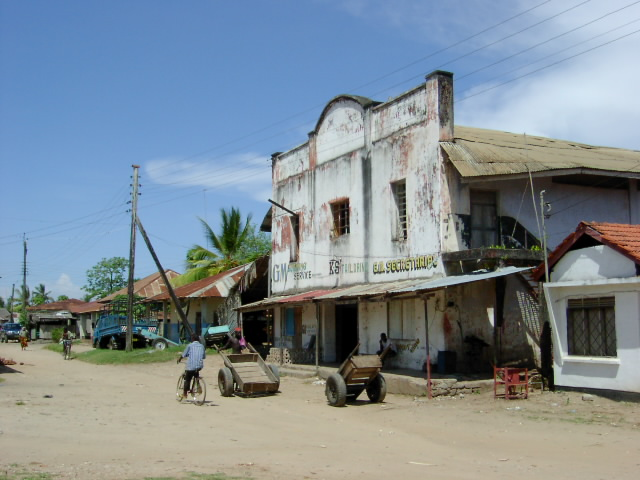
Street scene in quiet Pangani

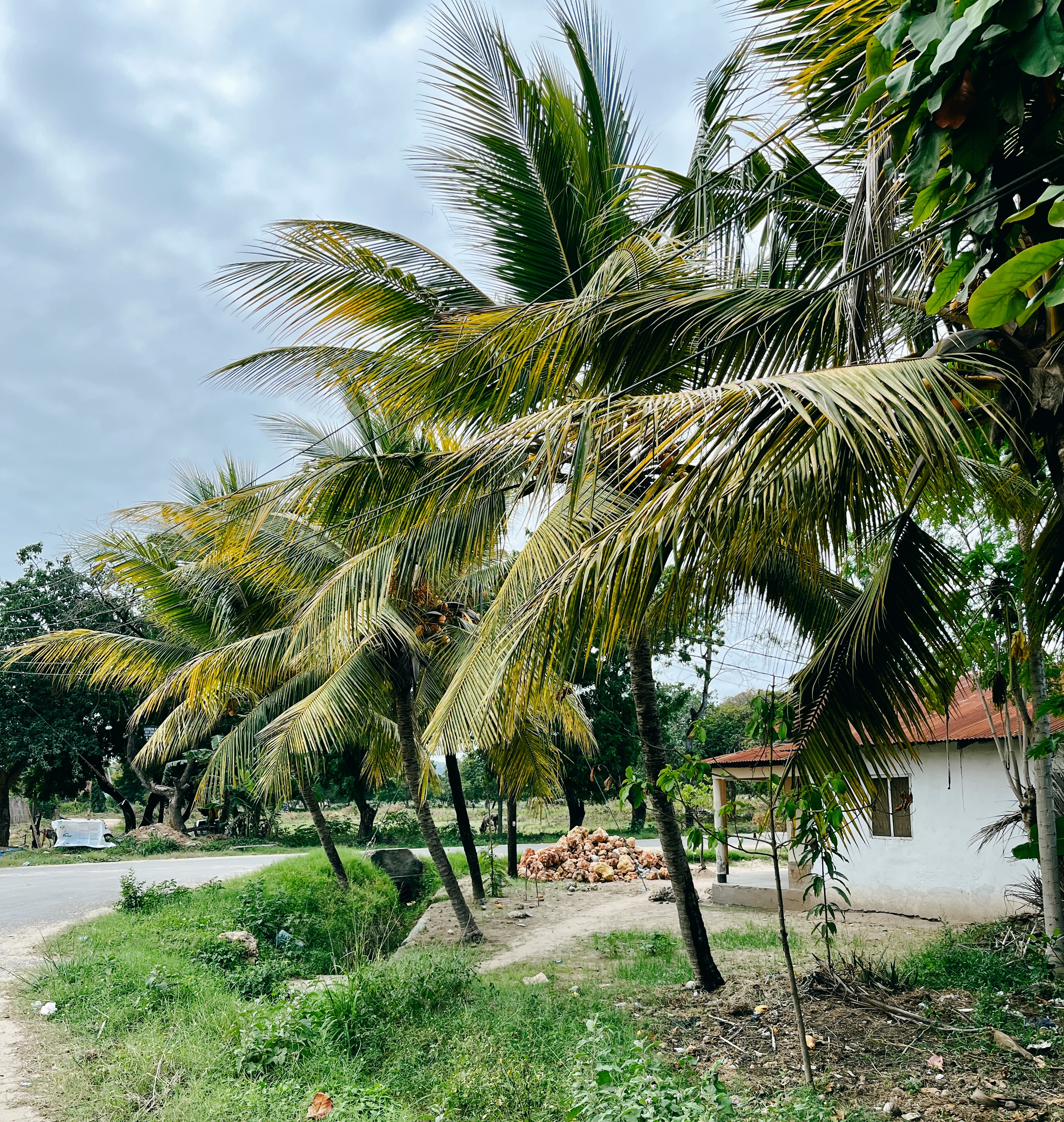
Coconut lined street in Pangani

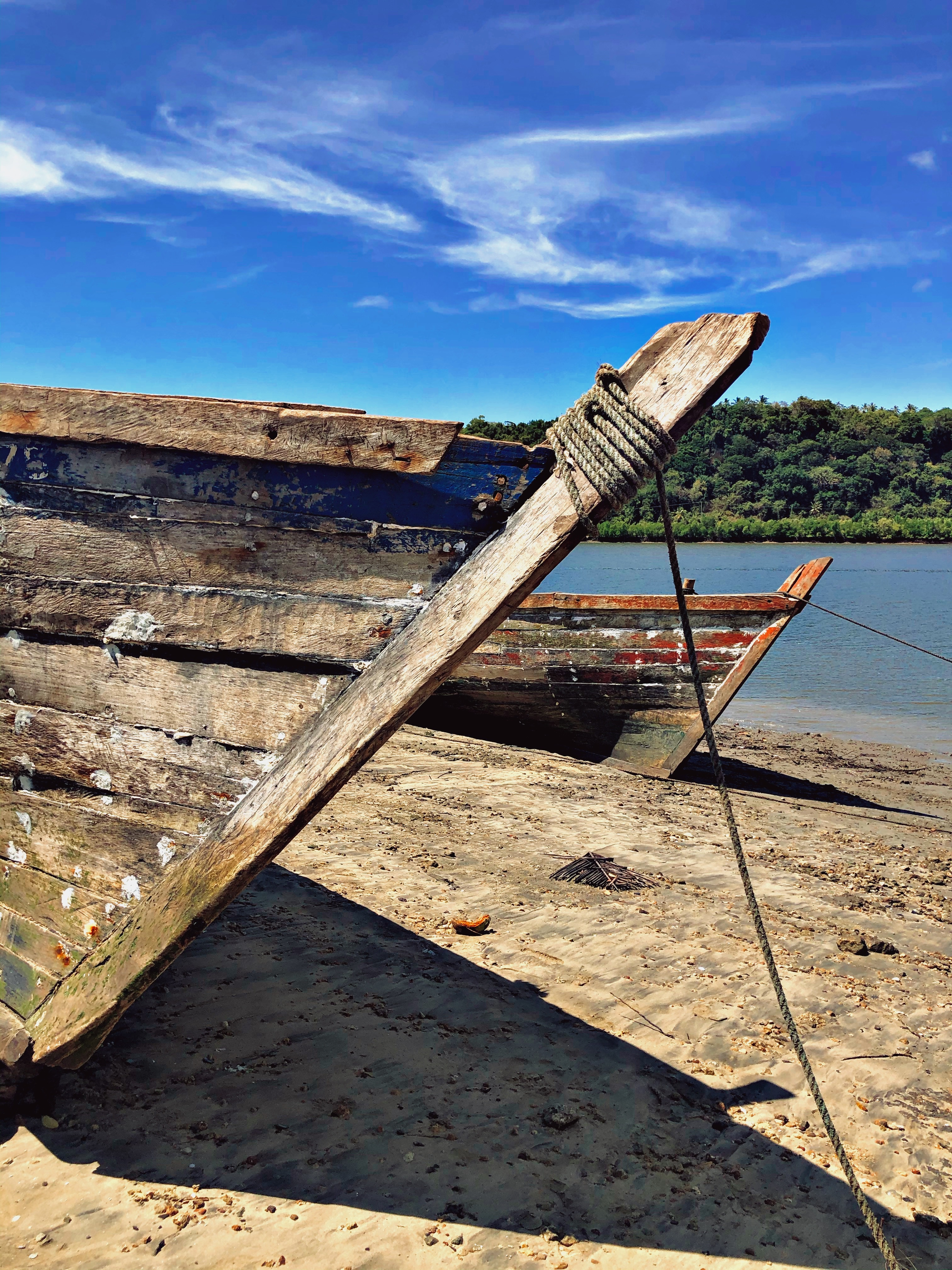
Beach scene in Pangani

Pangani (Mji wa Pangani, in Swahili) is a historic town and capital of Pangani District in the Tanga Region of Tanzania. The town lies 45 km (28 mi) south of the city of Tanga, at the mouth of the Pangani River in which the town is named after. Administrately the town Pangani is situated within two wards, Pangani Mashariki and Pangani Magharibi. The town is currently the largest settlement in Pangani District and is a major tourist attraction in Tanga region and is a home to Muhembo, a Tanzanian National Historic Site.

== History ==
=== First settlers ===
The first people to live in Pangani Bay were hunter-gatherers during the Palaeolithic era. They fashioned tools out of quartz river pebbles by hammering them with simple, forceful blows. Southwest of Bweni, the escarpment is covered in debris from the production and usage of stone tools. Lithic artefacts from more recent sites show that populations that used iron for agriculture continued to use (or even went back to) stone technologies after making the shift to an agricultural lifestyle, occasionally employing rare raw materials from upriver. By 600–1000 C.E., if not earlier, farming villages using iron began to appear in the region. They created TIW and dwelt near the Pangani River or atop escarpments with a view of the waterway. The farming peoples of Pangani Bay were the Bondei and Zigua.

Early TIW found close to Kumbamtoni resembled coastal pottery from the southern and central parts of the Swahili coast. Such pottery are accompanied with more than 20 disc beads made of sea shells in Kumbamtoni. Along the river bank, there are also a few Maore Ware sherds that come from the interior of the continent. At sites in Pangani Bay, there is no indication of foreign ceramics from before 1000 C.E., such as Sasanian Islamic variations. However, the discovery of a purported Roman ceramic (or Indic copy) points to communication with the larger Indian Ocean in the first millennium C.E.

=== The Swahili period ===
During the Swahili era (1250–1550 CE), interactions between indigenous tribes of the Pangani coast and communities in the Indian Ocean took place, but at a minor level. Thus, the "Golden Age" of the Swahili (1250/1350-1550 C.E., but especially the earlier centuries within this range) influenced littoral settlers in northeastern Tanzania, although not nearly to the extent felt at Kilwa on the southern Swahili coast (where the gold trade flourished 1200-1350 C.E.) or at Mombasa and Malindi in Kenya. Late in this era, Tongoni as well as Swahili towns on Tanga Island (in the bay near Tanga Town) with monumental Swahili architecture began to grow in importance.

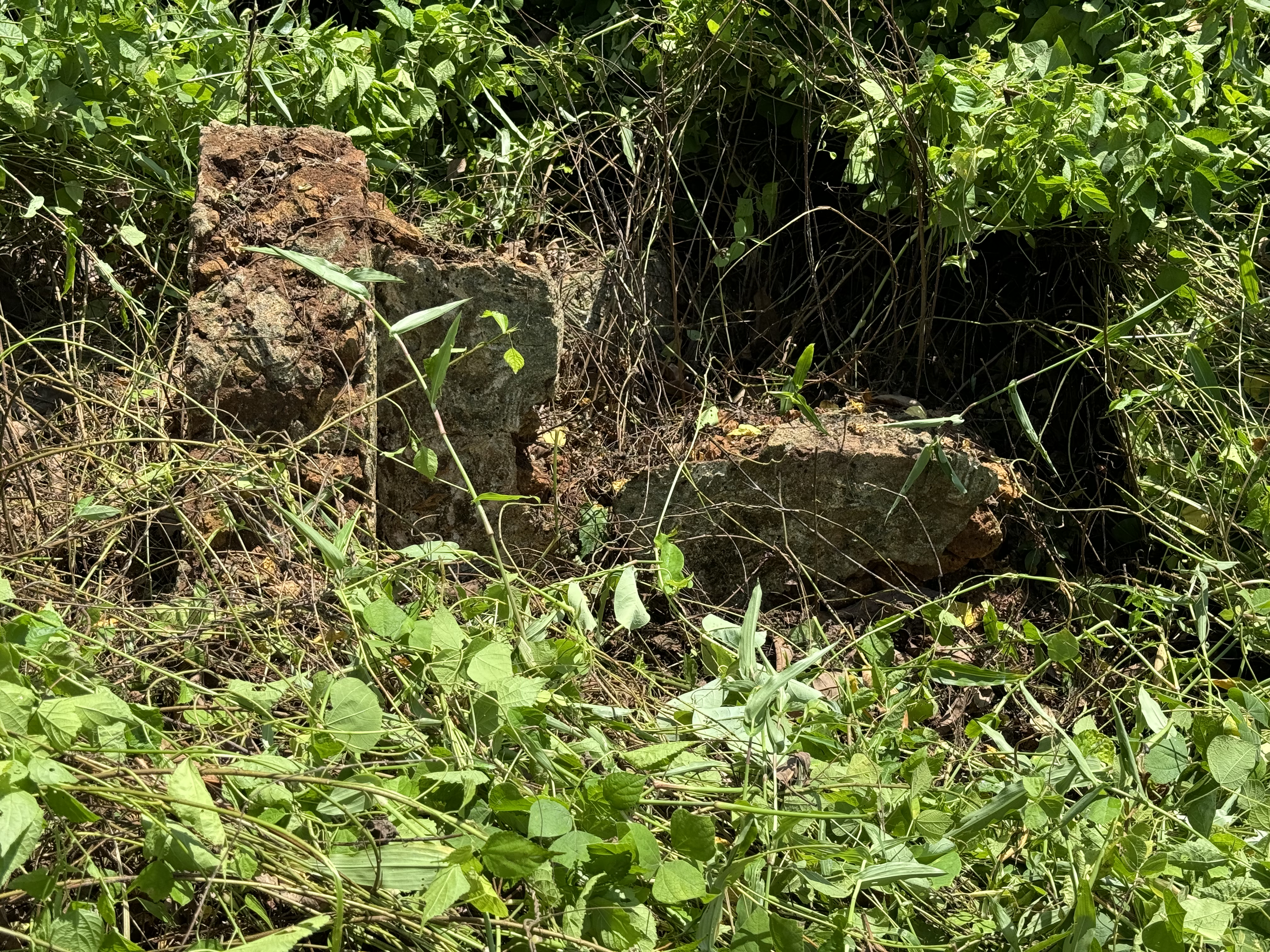
Grave at Historic Muhembo ruins, Pangani DC, Tanga Region

Archaeologists have also found the remains of small 15th century Swahili settlements on the bluffs just north of Pangani at Muhembo, According to the research, Pangani Bay's first inhabitant's Zanjian traditions served as the cradle of later Swahili culture. From the Zanjian to the Swahili periods, local people continued to practise the majority of their pottery, trading, and culinary practises. Minor alterations are also discernible, most likely due to ongoing interactions with bordering groups along the shore. From the Zanjian to the Swahili periods, pottery with comparable form and ornamentation was employed.

Shellfish evidence reveals patterns of food collecting by the first inhabitants and the kinds of foods that were consumed, suggesting both change and continuity. The discovery of Sasanian Islamic wares from the Persian Gulf during the Zanjian period and black-and-yellow ceramics from the Red Sea during the Swahili eras is evidence of the old maritime trade history in Pangani Bay. The pottery in Zanjian and Swahili villages in Pangani Bay shared characteristics with that of sites on the East African coast (Shanga, Kilwa, and Kaole), as well as its hinterland (Mombo), in addition to the recognised internal cultural continuity. Such evidence suggests that the people of Pangani Bay are still connected to other communities in East Africa on a regional level.

The southern Swahili coast (south of Tanga Town) is thought to have developed a different tradition from the northern coast (from Mombasa to the Lamu Archipelago in Kenya) before 1250 C.E. Due to a shift in Islamic influence (from the Persian Gulf to the Red Sea) that brought people together and encouraged settlement growth and expansion, the northern shore dominated the economy during this time. on this model, resurrected leadership anchored on Islamic doctrine, iconography, and emulation increased trade monopolies and sparked close ties with other groups in the Indian Ocean through trade. During this time, it is likely that a rigid, emic idea of the African hinterland developed as wealthy coastal Swahili town dwellers (waungwana) saw the need to set themselves apart from people who lived in the interior in order to consolidate their authority and safeguard expanding trade monopolies.

Surface investigations revealed 18 Swahili sites, including Mnyongeni, Mtakani, and Kumbamtoni (1250–1550 C.E.). Villagers in Muhembo and Tongoni were constructing coral structures and going to mosques for prayer by 1400 C.E. These were the two biggest towns in their respective regions at the time. Other community members (from Muhembo and Tongoni) resided in distant wattle-and-daub homes. Foreign contacts, which may be seen in the archaeological record in the form of Asian ceramics and glass beads, had a significant impact on the formation of identity borders. For example, 62 of 81 (75.3%) of the beads found during excavations at these sites—92 of 108 (85.2%) at Muhembo (Site 37 in Survey Unit 4); and Tongoni—are of foreign (glass) provenance. Among other things, locals created iron tools, textiles, nonglass beads, and ceramics.

The situation along the coast was different after 1550 C.E. In contrast to Mombasa, the majority of coastal cities shrank in population, lost their once-dominant status, or even fell into ruin. By 1600 C.E. and 1850 C.E., respectively, pottery from Post-Swahili and Post-Post-Swahili settlements were widespread. The initial phase of these at Pangani was characterised by diffuse settlement. Compared to sites from earlier, Swahili times, those that included only Post-Swahili materials were found during the survey to be relatively smaller. On the other hand, findings from sites containing mostly Swahili artefacts are scarcely any Post-Swahili remains.

=== Omani colonial period ===
The worldwide slave and ivory traffic grew more intense throughout the nineteenth century, and Omani (and European) plantation agriculture gained sway, compounding the pressures of earlier eras. The natives fled to hamlets far from Pangani Town, the occupied political hub. Increased foreign engagement is evidenced by the abundance of novel glass bead kinds and numerous pottery from India, China, and Europe found at Gombero. Villagers in Gombero and other locations along Tanzania's northeastern coast (such as Tongoni, Excavation Unit 3 and Mtakani, Site 51a, Excavation Unit 1) frequently ate mud whelks in recent centuries, possibly as a result of diminishing food supplies (and a growing population). As an alternative, plantation enslavement might have hindered local food production and/or hunting opportunities.

The plantations were worked by slave labor, and Pangani also became an important center of the slave trade, shipping captives taken in the wars attendant on the collapse of the Shambaa kingdom in the Usambara mountains to the plantations of Pemba and Zanzibar. Pangani's modern town came to prominence in the mid 19th century, when, under nominal Zanzibari rule, it was a major terminus of caravan routes to the deep interior. From the 1860s onward townspeople established large plantations of sugar and coconut in Mauya, along the banks of the river just west of town. After Sultan Barghash bin Said of Zanzibar signed treaties with Great Britain outlawing the ocean-going trade in slaves in 1873, Pangani became a center for smuggling slaves across the narrow channel to Pemba, in evasion of Royal Navy warships.

By the middle of the nineteenth century, large caravans were regularly transporting both slaves and ivory to Pangani Bay. Caravans "herded" (-fuga) slaves to Pangani Town to work or be sent abroad, according to Mzee Mchande, a local elder. Large-scale production of coconuts, sugar, and sisal was first brought to the lower river basin after the 1880s through plantation initiatives at Mauya. Among others, Arabic-speaking Omani landowners created a "brutally rationalised form of plantation production" in earlier decades that abused slaves. Maroons (also known as watoro, or escaped slaves) established hideouts in remote locations. Slavery, servitude, and plantation labour have left behind structural remains that stand as reminders of violence. The diversified population of Pangani Bay includes residents from other places as well as people who self-identify as Zigua, Bondei, Digo, Iloikop, and Bena as a result of this area's long history of exploitation and more recent diaporas (related to the development of cash crops).

=== The German colonial period ===
During the eighteen years (1888–1906) of Christian Lautherborn's employment as a plantation manager for the German East Africa Company (DOAG), plantation agriculture was largely recognised as the most effective strategy for advancing the new colony. Indeed, one of the main justifications for colonial expansion in German East Africa and other places was the introduction of modern agriculture through European-run plantations. This task was taken seriously by Lautherborn since it served as the cornerstone of his sense of identity and self-worth.

His letters to his family, sister, and brother-in-law, as well as to the readers of Vendsyssel Tidende, provide a window into the lives, ideas, and experiences of a pragmatic imperialist who was keen to modernise agricultural productivity and introduce "civilization" to the area. Yet the realities of a complicated and frequently contentious scenario quickly caused this initially straightforward ambition to fail.

In 1888, Pangani was the center of an armed movement to resist German colonial conquest of the mainland Tanzanian coast. The local leader of the resistance was Abushiri ibn Salim al-Harthi, a Swahili-speaker born in Zanzibar who owned a small estate at the suburb that now bears his name. Abushiri was instrumental in coordinating resistance to German conquest along much of the coast. The Germans hanged him at Pangani in December 1889.

In the 1890s, German troops quenched the Bushiri Rebellion, a local uprising, and the residents of Pangani Bay once more fell victim to outside intrusion. They attempted to exert authority over the interior of the continent and "pacify" coastal populations. The popular leader of the insurrection was ultimately hanged by the Germans. The British established indirect rule following World War I. Residents still living there have memories connected to these unique interactions, exploitations, and acts of violence that shape their legacy.

==== The sisal plantations ====
Within months of Lautherbonrn's arrival, a coastal uprising (1888–1890) broke out, driving him and the other Europeans out of Pangani. Lautherborn relocated to Bagamoyo, one of the two surviving DOAG strongholds, during the uprising, took up guns, learned new skills as a builder, and created labour and management practises that would influence the rest of his stay in the area. In fact, he brought a large portion of his primarily Nyamwezi staff with him when he returned to Kikogwe, his sisal plantation south of Pangani. He started working on building a successful, modern plantation once more, one that produced a profit.

This was never going to be an easy task because many crops did not adapt well to plantation cultivation, labour was still difficult to find and keep, and commodity prices fluctuated greatly. Unlike most, Lautherborn was more successful. He demonstrated the commercial viability of sisal, kept workers on the job during a labour shortage, and received praise from all quarters for his efficient plantation management.

=== The British colonial period ===
On 13 July 1916 the Royal Navy monitor HMS Severn bombarded Pangani. On 23 July the Germans surrendered the town to British land and naval forces.

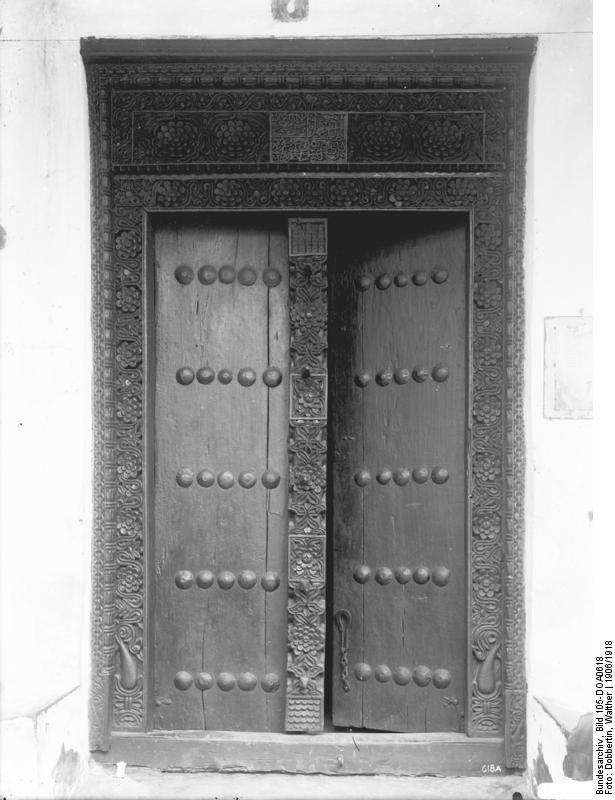
Swahili door in Pangani, early 20th century CE

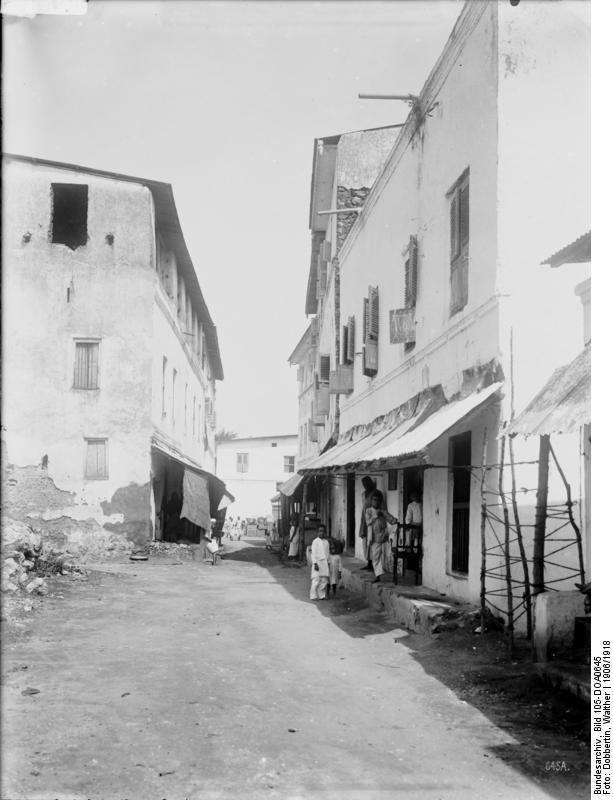
old Pangani, early 20th century CE

== Economy ==
The Mauya plantations no longer grow sugar, but produce much coconut and betel-nut. Pangani was once a secondary center of the sisal industry, servicing sisal plantations to the north and south of town. Pangani also has a fishing industry. In recent years beach resorts north and south of the town have brought tourists. The town is a district headquarters. Its hospital draws patients from many parts of the region. Funguni Secondary School is in Pangani Town and Boza Secondary School is a short distance north.

== See also ==
- Historic Swahili Settlements

== Sources ==
- R.M. Gramly, "Archaeological reconnaissance at Pangani Bay," Tanzania Notes and Records, 86/87 (1981), 17–28. ISSN 0039-9485
- Jonathon Glassman, Feasts and Riot: Revelry, Rebellion, and Popular Consciousness on the Swahili Coast, 1856-1888 (Portsmouth: Heinemann; Dar es Salaam: Mkuki na Nyota; Nairobi: EAEP, 1995).
