= Ubangaa =

Ward in Pangani District, Tanga Region

Ubangaa Kata ya Ubangaa (Swahili)
- Ward
- Kata ya Ubangaa, Wilaya ya Pangani
- Location within Tanzania
- Country: Tanzania
- Region: Tanga Region
- District: Pangani District

Area
  - Total: 199 km^{2} (77 sq mi)
- Elevation: 38 m (125 ft)

Population (2012)
  - Total: 2,112
  - Density: 10.6/km^{2} (27.5/sq mi)

Ethnic groups
  - Settler: Swahili
  - Ancestral: Zigua
- Tanzanian Postal Code: 21308

Ubangaa is an administrative ward in Pangani District of Tanga Region in Tanzania. The ward covers an area of 199 km^{2} (77 sq mi), and has an average elevation of 38 m (125 ft). According to the 2012 census, the ward has a total population of 2,112.
