= Mkalamo =

Ward in Pangani District, Tanga Region

Mkalamo Kata ya Mkalamo (Swahili)
- Ward
- Kata ya Mkalamo, Wilaya ya Pangani
- Location within Tanzania
- Country: Tanzania
- Region: Tanga Region
- District: Pangani District

Area
  - Total: 250 km^{2} (97 sq mi)
- Elevation: 87 m (285 ft)

Population (2012)
  - Total: 5,565
  - Density: 22/km^{2} (58/sq mi)

Ethnic groups
  - Settler: Swahili
  - Ancestral: Zigua
- Tanzanian Postal Code: 21313

Mkalamo is an administrative ward in Pangani District of Tanga Region in Tanzania with an area of 250 km^{2} (97 sq mi), and an average elevation of 87 m (285 ft). According to the 2012 census it had a population of 5,565.
