= Bweni =

Ward in Pangani District, Tanga Region

Bweni Kata ya Bweni (Swahili)
- Ward
- Kata ya Bweni, Wilaya ya Pangani
- Location within Tanzania
- Country: Tanzania
- Region: Tanga Region
- District: Pangani District

Area
  - Total: 20.6 km^{2} (8.0 sq mi)
- Elevation: 33 m (108 ft)

Population (2012)
  - Total: 1,263
  - Density: 61.3/km^{2} (159/sq mi)

Ethnic groups
  - Settler: Swahili
  - Ancestral: Zigua
- Tanzanian Postal Code: 21303

Bweni is an administrative ward in Pangani District of Tanga Region in Tanzania. The ward covers an area of 20.6 km^{2} (8.0 sq mi), and has an average elevation of 33 m (108 ft). According to the 2012 census, the ward has a total population of 1,263.

== See also ==
- List of Swahili settlements of the East African coast
