= Pangani District =

District of Tanga Region, Tanzania

Pangani District Wilaya ya Pangani (Swahili)
- District of Tanga
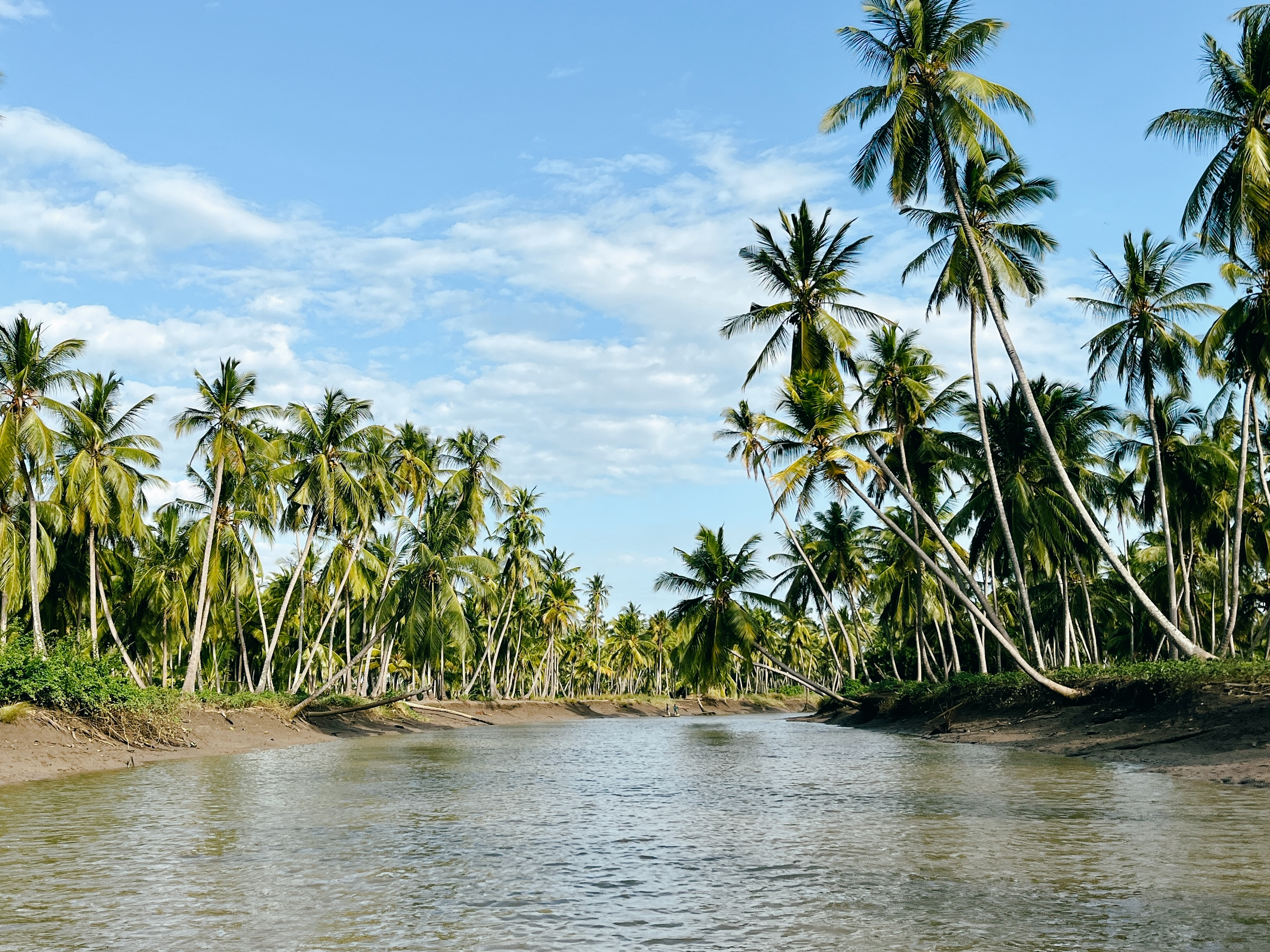
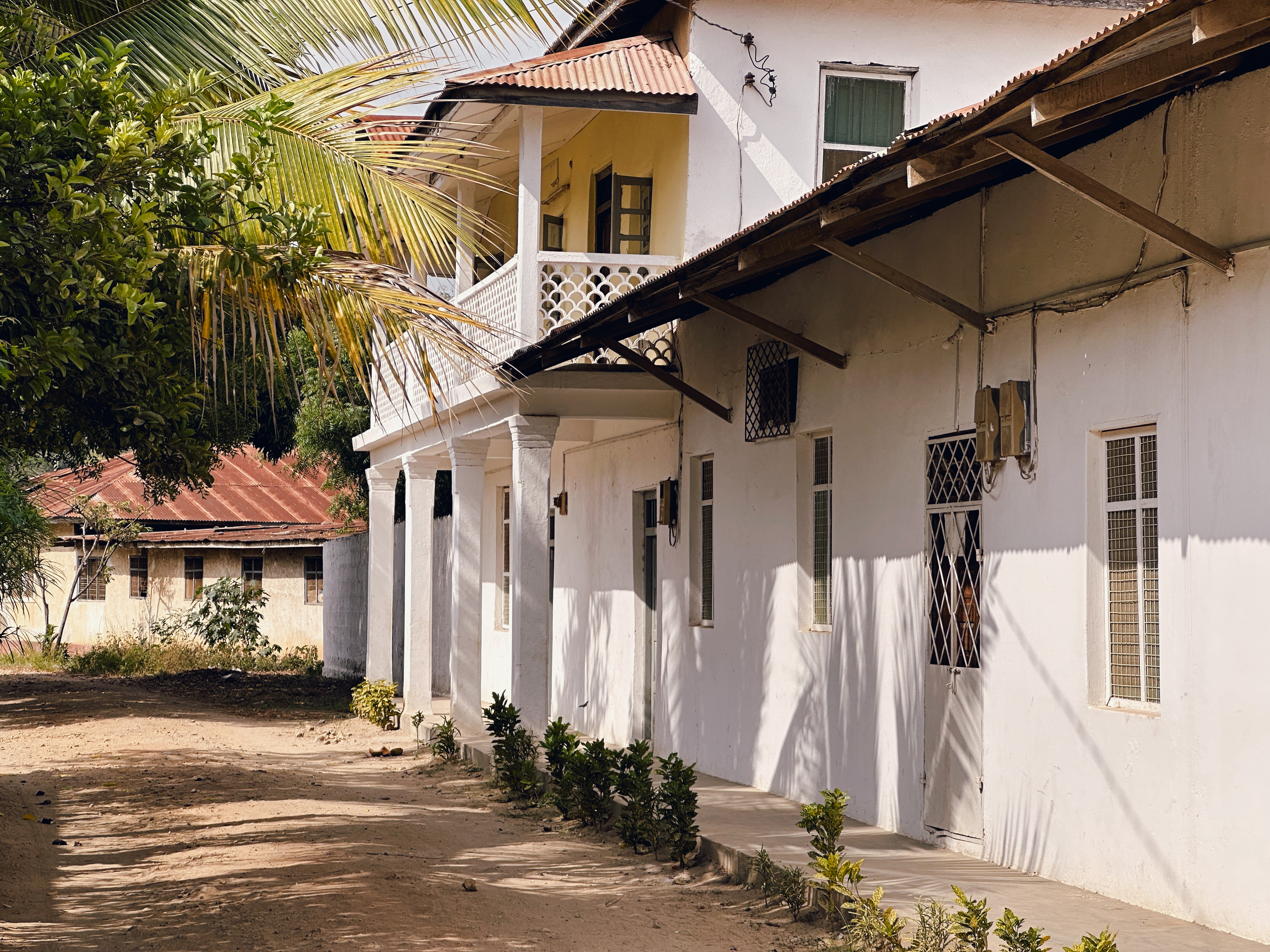
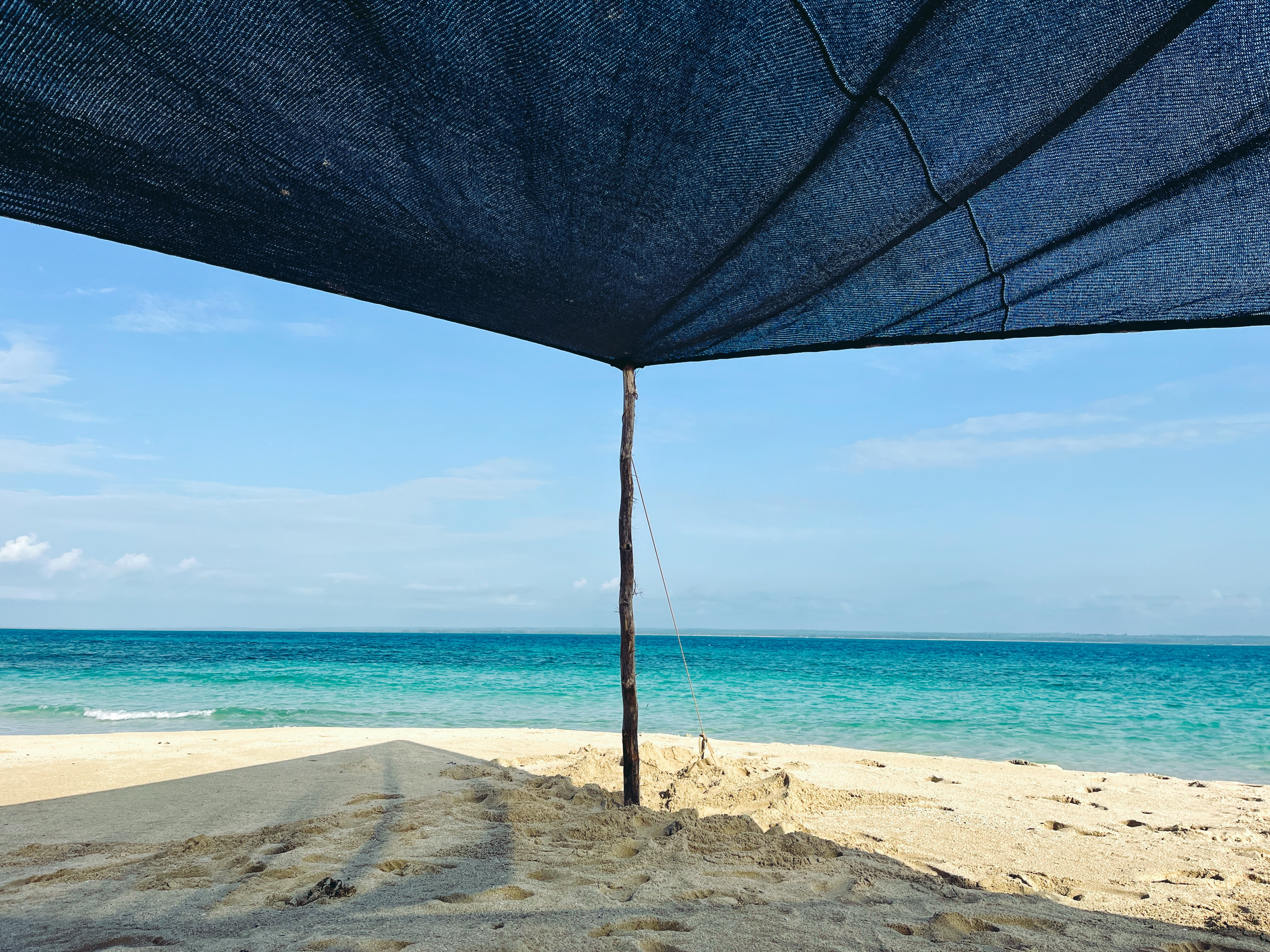
- From top to bottom: Coconuts in Pangani River delta in Bushiri ward of Pangani District, historic Pangani town & Funguni reef sandbank in Pangani District
- Nickname: Tanga's paradise
- Pangani District in Tanga
- Coordinates: 5°34′36″S 38°50′26″E
- Country: Tanzania
- Region: Tanga Region
- Named for: Pangani River
- Capital: Pangani Mashariki

Area
  - Total: 1,756 km^{2} (678 sq mi)
  - Rank: 8th in Tanga

Population (2022)
  - Total: 75,642
  - Rank: 6th in Tanga
  - Density: 43.08/km^{2} (111.6/sq mi)

Ethnic groups
  - Settler: Swahili
  - Native: Bondei & Zigua
- Time zone: UTC+3 (EAT)
- Tanzanian Postcode: 213
- Website: Official website
- Symbols of Tanzania
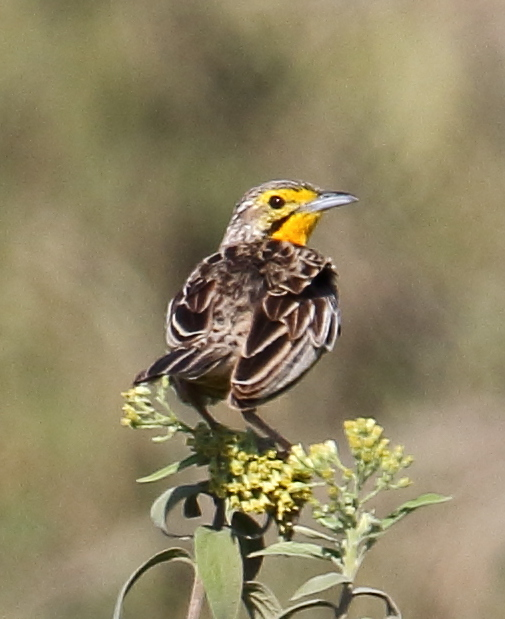
- Bird: Pangani longclaw

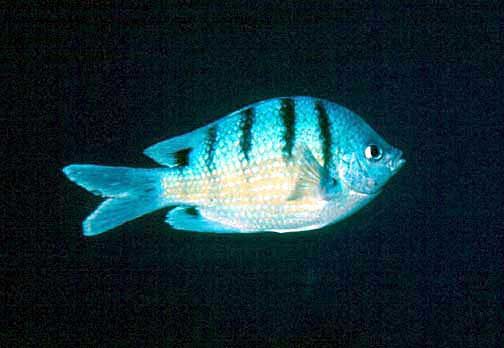
- Fish: Green damselfish

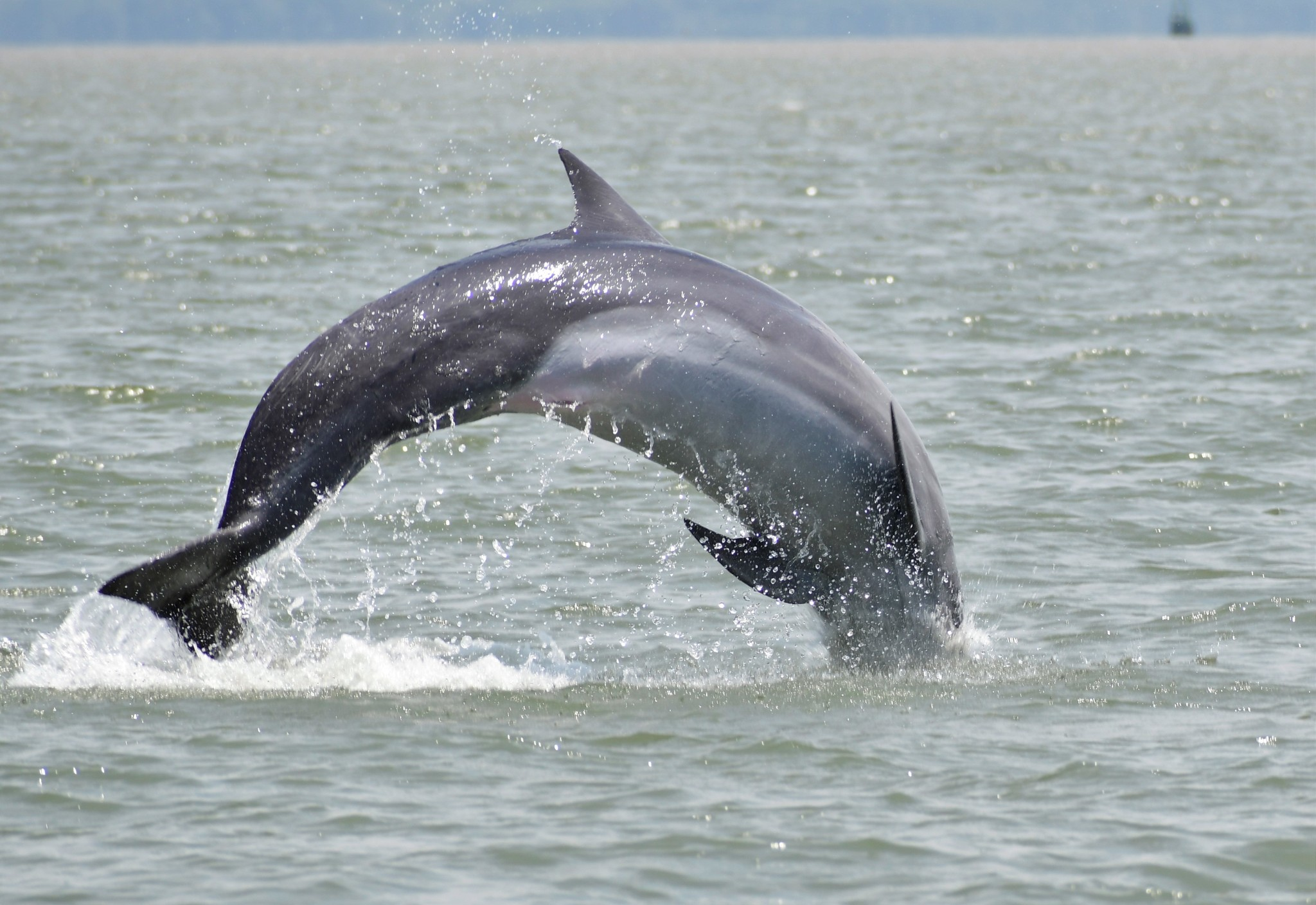
- Mammal: Common bottlenose dolphin

Pangani District Council (Swahili: Wilaya ya Pangani) is one of eleven administrative districts of Tanga Region in Tanzania. The District covers an area of 1,756 km^{2} (678 sq mi). It is bordered to the north by Muheza District, to the east by Zanzibar Channel, to the south by the Chalinze District of Pwani Region, and to the west by the Handeni District. The district is comparable in size to the land area of Guadeloupe. The district seat (capital) and largest settlement in Pangani district is the town of Pangani. The district is named after the historic Pangani River. As of the 2022 census, the population was Pangani district was 75,642, making it the least populous district in Tanga Region.

== Administrative subdivisions ==
=== Wards ===
As of 2012, Pangani District is administratively divided into 13 wards:

- Bushiri
- Bweni
- Kimang'a
- Kipumbwi
- Madanga
- Mikinguni
- Mkalamo
- Mkwaja
- Mwera
- Pangani Magharibi
- Pangani Mashariki
- Tungamaa
- Ubangaa

== Geography ==
Pangani district is one of the smallest districts in Tanga region at 1,831 square kilometers, however, it has the longest coastline in the region. Pangani district is bordered to the north by the Muheza District, to the east by the Indian Ocean, to the south by the Pwani Region and to the west by the Handeni District.

=== Climate ===
Pangani district is located in the tropical zone thus having a tropical savannah climate. It is classified as As by the Köppen climate classification. It has an average annual temperature of 25.7 degrees Celsius and an annual precipitation of 1271 millimetres.

== History ==
The Pangani district is known for being the site of the Medieval Swahili settlement of Mshembo in what is now the town of Pangani and Bweni across the Pangani River mouth's southern bank.

== Demographics ==
The area that is now Pangani District has been inhabited by humans for thousands of years. The area is the ancestral home to two Bantu people groups, namely the Bondei people and the Zigua. According to the 2002 Tanzania National Census, the population of the Pangani District was 44,107. According to the 2012 Tanzania National Census, the population of Pangani District was 54,025, with population density of 29.5 persona per square kilometer.

Pangani, which is predominately Muslim district, is a part of the Swahili culture that extends north and south along the seashore with Zanzibar serving as its spiritual hub. The sisal and copra plantation industries, which employed both locally born employees and the enormous number of migrant labourers that make up the majority of the population, are in charge of the country's economic existence. The majority of people live in and around estates, in urban and peri-urban areas, and in predominantly male groups that are stable in structure but unstable in composition. On the other hand, the coastal villages have a predominantly female population and a high level of population and form stability.

There is a clear cultural split in the late 19th century between the dialect-speaking, Christian and Pagan, migrants on the sisal estates and the Swahili-speaking, Muslims of the coastal Swahili towns. The historical disparity between the Afro-Arab elite and their slaves is reflected in the limited social interaction between these groups.

The real social divide is between the older, more established Swahili families in the established villages who own land, speak Swahili, profess Islam, and follow a subset of Islamic culture, and the immigrants who are viewed as socially inferior and who are Christians or pagan and speak different languages. The former group, plantation owners or fishermen, who are employers of labour, is sharply divided from the latter who provide the work for them, are not very interested in permanent agriculture, and are highly mobile. This dichotomy, which was originally derived from the distinction between the coastal Afro-Arab slave economy and the inland slave-providing tribes, is still maintained today in the economic sphere.

The Swahili families are under continual strain to maintain their conscious superiority particularly when the migrants settle locally. Neither side is interested in contact with the other. Transfers to the superior group are well disguised and take place through marriage and conversion to Islam, combined with slow assimilation during a long period of residence on the fringe of a Swahili village until with the passage of years the newcomers are gradually accepted as part of the Swahili society. Against this background, the presence of the immigrant residents in the villages is to be explained. They consist partly of long-term migrants exfoliated from the estates, after a period of residence on them, because of social ambition (i.e. to be regarded as a member of the coastal superior class or because of the more significant economic benefit to be derived from cultivating their plantations bought with their savings or cleared from the bush.
