= Kirare =

Ward in Tanga City Council, Tanga Region

Kirare Kata ya Kirare (Swahili)
- Ward of Tanga City Council
- From top to bottom
- Interactive map of Kirare
- Coordinates: 5°14′53.16″S 39°1′39.72″E
- Country: Tanzania
- Region: Tanga Region
- District: Tanga City Council

Area
  - Total: 55.6 km^{2} (21.5 sq mi)

Population (2012)
  - Total: 4,756

Ethnic groups
  - Settler: Swahili
  - Ancestral: Digo & Segeju
- Tanzanian Postal Code: 21210

Kirare (Kata ya Kirare , in Swahili) is an administrative ward in Tanga City Council of Tanga Region in Tanzania. Marungu forms the ward's northern boundary. Tongoni is to the east. Kigombe ward is in the south. The Muheza District ward of Ngomeni is to the west. The ward covers an area of 55.6 km^{2} (21.5 sq mi), and has an average elevation of 39 m (128 ft). According to the 2012 census, the ward has a total population of 4,756.

== Administration ==
The postal code for Kirare Ward is 21210. The ward is divided into the following neighborhoods (Mitaa):

- Kirare

- Mapojoni

=== Government ===
The ward, like every other ward in the country, has local government offices based on the population served.The Kirare Ward administration building houses a court as per the Ward Tribunal Act of 1988, including other vital departments for the administration the ward. The ward has the following administration offices:

- Kirare Police Station
- Kirare Government Office (Afisa Mtendaji)
- Kirare Tribunal (Baraza La Kata) is a Department inside Ward Government Office

In the local government system of Tanzania, the ward is the smallest democratic unit. Each ward is composed of a committee of eight elected council members which include a chairperson, one salaried officer (with no voting rights), and an executive officer. One-third of seats are reserved for women councillors.

== Demographics ==
Like much of the district, the ward is the ancestral home of the Digo people and Segeju.

== Education and health ==
=== Education ===
The ward is home to these educational institutions:

- Kirare Primary School
- Mapojoni Primary School
- Kirare Secondary School

=== Healthcare ===
The ward is home to the following health institutions:

- Kirare Health Center
