= Bondei language =

Northeast Coast Bantu of Tanzania

Bondei
- Native to: Tanzania
- Ethnicity: Bondei
- Native speakers: (50,000 cited 2000)
- Language family: Niger–Congo?: Atlantic–Congo; Volta–Congo; Benue–Congo; Bantoid; Southern Bantoid; Bantu; Northeast Coast Bantu; Seuta; Bondei–Shambala; Bondei

Language codes
- ISO 639-3: bou
- Glottolog: bond1247
- Guthrie code: G.24
- ELP: Bondei

Bondei is a Northeast Coast Bantu of Tanzania closely related to Shambala.
