= Handeni District =

District of Tanga Region, Tanzania

Handeni Wilaya ya Handeni (Swahili)
- District
- Wilaya ya Handeni, Mkoa wa Tanga
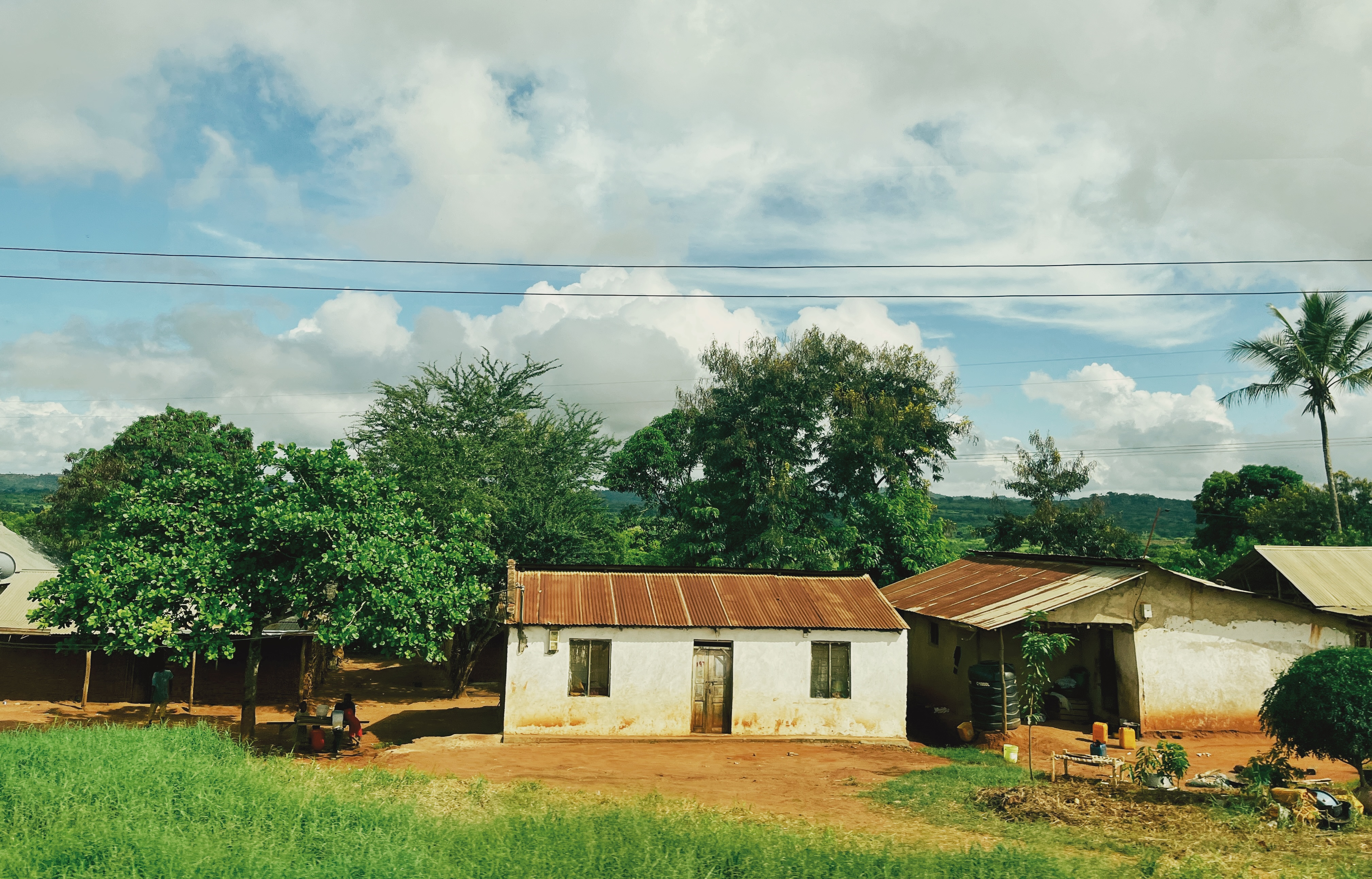
- Manga Village, Mkata Ward, Handeni District

- Handeni District in Tanga 2022
- Coordinates: 5°30′32.76″S 38°20′20.04″E
- Country: Tanzania
- Region: Tanga Region
- Capital: Mkata

Area
  - Total: 6,534 km^{2} (2,523 sq mi)
  - Rank: 1/11

Population (2022 census)
  - Total: 384,353
  - Density: 58.82/km^{2} (152.4/sq mi)
- Demonym: Handenian

Ethnic groups
  - Settler: Swahili
  - Native: Zigua
- Website: www.tanga.go.tz

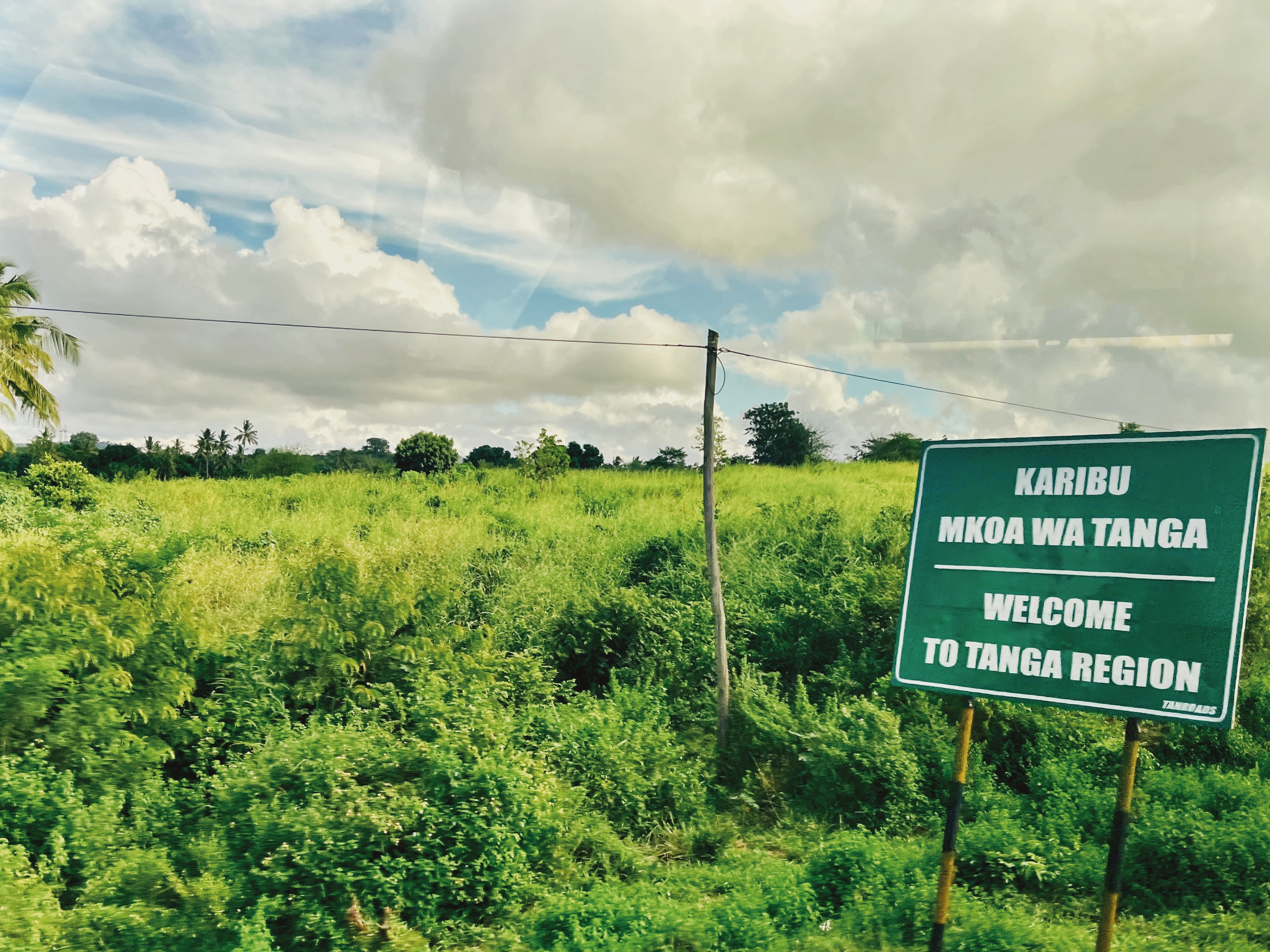
Welcome to Tanga sign, Handeni District

Handeni District is one of the 11 districts of Tanga Region in Tanzania. The District covers an area of 6,534 km^{2} (2,523 sq mi). It is bordered to the west by the Kilindi District and the Handeni Urban District, to the north by the Korogwe District, to the east by the Pangani District, and to the south by the Pwani Region. In 2002 Kilindi District was formed out of the district. The administrative capital of the district is Mkata town. According to the 2002 Tanzania National Census, the population of the Handeni District was 248,633. According to the 2022 census, the population had increased to: 384,353.

== Administrative subdivisions ==
As of 2012, Handeni District Council was administratively divided into 20 wards.

=== Wards ===
1. Kabuku
2. Kabuku Ndani
3. Kang'ata
4. Pongwe Pogwe
5. Kiva
6. Komkonga
7. Kwachaga
8. Kwaluguru
9. Kwamatuku
10. Kwamgwe
11. Kwamkonje
12. Kwamsisi
13. Kwasunga
14. Kwedizinga
15. Mazingara
16. Mgambo
17. Misima
18. Mkata
19. Ndolwa
20. Segera
21. Sindeni

== In pop culture ==
The dramatic open area to the north of Handeni was the setting for Ernest Hemingway's classic hunting book, Green Hills of Africa.
