= Muhembo =

National Historic Site of Tanzania

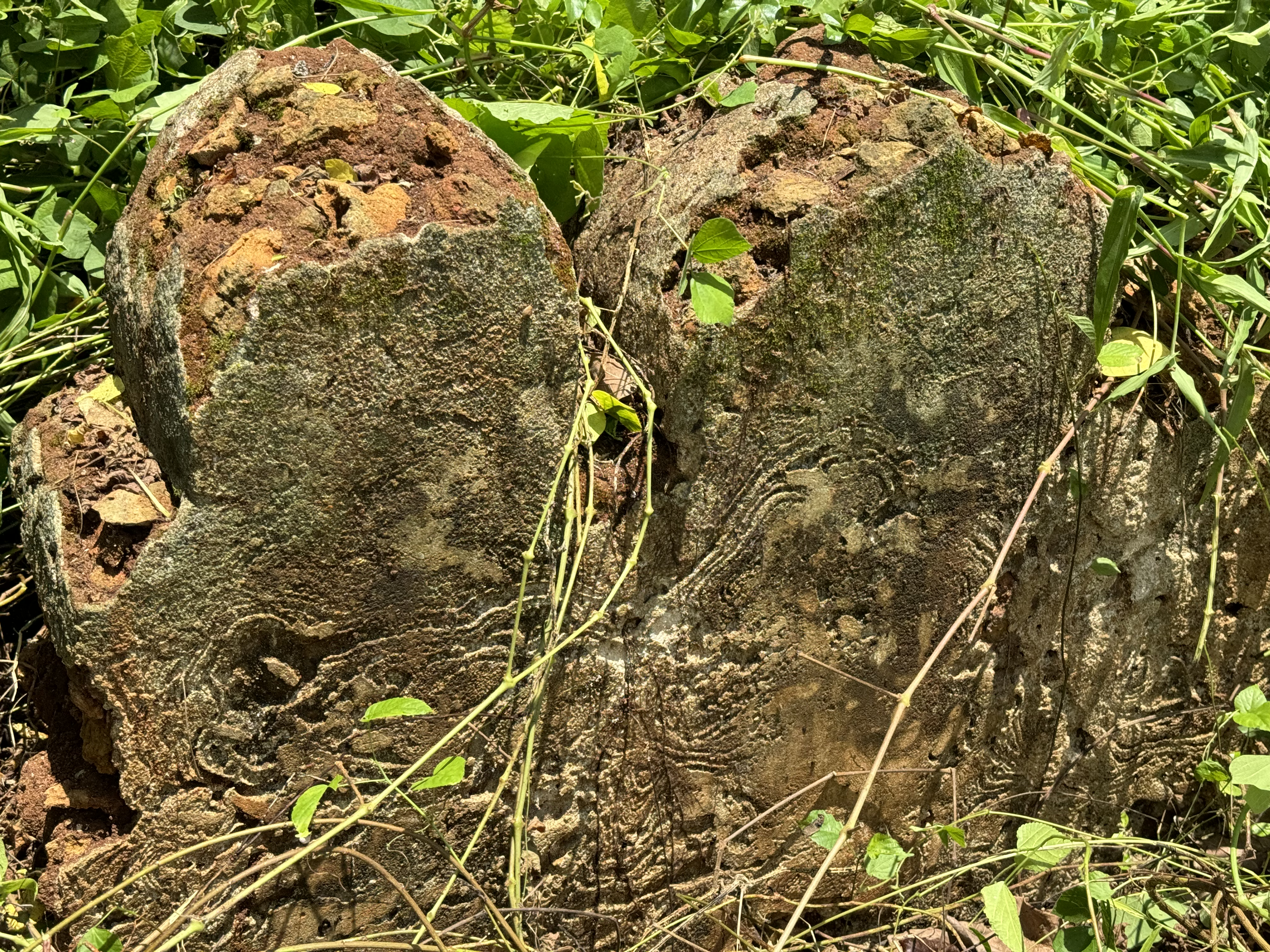
- Tombstone at Historic Muhembo ruins, Pangani DC, Tanga Region

- Location within Tanzania
- 5°24′36″S 38°59′21″E
- Type: Settlement
- Cultures: Swahili
- Location: Tanzania, Tanga Region, Pangani District, Pangani Mashariki ward,

History
- Built: 16th century CE
- Abandoned: 15th century CE

Site notes
- Material: Coral rag
- Architectural styles: Swahili & Islamic
- Excavation dates: 1981
- Archaeologists: Richard Gramly
- Condition: Severely damaged
- Owner: Tanzanian Government
- Management: Antiquities Division under the Ministry of Natural Resources and Tourism

National Historic Sites of Tanzania
- Official name: Muhembo Historic Site
- Type: Cultural

Muhembo (Swahili: Magofu ya Muhembo) is a Swahili monumental ruin that is National Historic Site located in northern part of Pangani town's Pangani Mashariki ward in Pangani District of Tanga Region, Tanzania. The site is home to damaged Medieval Swahili ruins that have yet to be excavated since 1981. Other minor sites in the viciinity of Muhembo include; Gombero, Mtakani, Muhembo, Mnyongeni, and Kumbamtoni.

== Overview ==
Archaeological exploration around Pangani Bay has shown that the location of old Pangani was different from where it is today as early as the 15th century. It may be presumed that the settlement during this time was modest and relatively impoverished by historical standards until more thorough excavations are conducted. Except for the lowest trinkets, local pottery was typically utilised instead of imported luxury goods from other countries and imported vessels. maintaining a custom from a bygone era. Some tasks required the use of implements made of flaked stone. The locals lived off the produce from their farms and plantations, along with some seafood. In essence, the archaeological evidence points to a style of life focused on local issues with few interactions to the outside world. What is known about Muhembo (the old Pangani) contrasts sharply with the material culture of the affluent minority that resided in stone and plaster towns elsewhere on the East African coast.

A settlement hierarchy and more connection emerged between 1250 and 1450 C.E. A mosque with a "northern" aesthetic emerged at Muhembo at this time, heralding a future change in elite cultural affiliations to the northern coast. Strange, foreign pottery, including pieces from Asia and the interior of Africa, are widely distributed nearby and are most likely from the middle to late middle of the second millennium C.E. The population decreased and/or scattered after 1550 CE (and up until 1750 CE), possibly in response to the Portuguese and/or internal conflicts and changes. The increased number of sites and various signs of contact show that communities living at the bay grew once more in the late eighteenth and nineteenth centuries.

Residents of coastal areas were drawn to larger settlements like Muhembo after 1550 C.E. This explanation explains why shellfish eating declined at sites near the Pangani River (such as Kumbamtoni and Site 52a), whereas increased intake of shellfish (and a decline in species variety) occurred at larger sites with massive remains (such as Muhembo). The increase in shellfish consumption at big sites (Muhembo, excavation units 1 and 2; Tongoni, excavation units 2 and 3) was especially noticeable outside of coral structures. Shellfish are off-limits to orthodox Muslims. As a result, patterns in the consumption of shellfish over the past 750 years suggest that many non-Muslim Africans who had been living in the countryside between 1250 and 1550 C.E. eventually moved to larger locations' non-monumental areas during the Post-Swahili era.

== Site ==
Muhembo has a view of both the Indian Ocean and an old river channel. The coralline promontory at the outlying waterfront (directly east) and the slope on which Muhembo is situated seem to shield it from the harshest monsoon winds. Muhembo's surface is devoid of obstruction-causing flora, with the exception of a few upslope areas in its northwesterly extension. The landscape is covered in enormous baobabs and coconut trees, notably in the northern and central regions. The principal ruins at Muhembo are located immediately west of the sheer cliff at Boza.

A small area of the site's surface is covered in mounds of debris that include the remains of a coral mosque and a few crumbling ruins. declared the mosque to be a "northern" kind. To the north of the mosque, a grove of trees also hides pillar tombs that are thought to date from the seventeenth to nineteenth century. Surface examinations revealed that the mound's contents are made up of wall and roof fall. Locals consider this area to be a mzimu, or spirit place, despite the fact that it is now covered in underbrush and shrubbery (a few of whom tend and harvest coconuts there).

Outside and immediately northeast of the mosque, on the same low mound, are coral walls that appear to be residential buildings. Coral fragments are also found in other locations on the site, however it is unclear if these are wall fragments or other relics that could date to a time after the mosque. The debris mound just to the north of the remaining mihrab is covered with at least three tombs from recent decades.

In the immediate neighbourhood of the ruins, there are a few plate fragments of blue-green Islamic monochrome (dating from the fourteenth to the seventeenth century), coiled and drawn glass beads, and animal remains that are found in low densities among the palm trees and along a pathway. We found two fist-sized "biscuits" of slag at a location about 150 metres northeast of the ruins. To the north, Muhembo is bounded by a sizable murram pit. Since the 1970s, this coral borrow pit has produced road building materials, destroying a large portion of the site's northern section in the process, most likely including the location of Gramly's (1981) excavation trench, which was dug in the late 1970s. The surface of the disturbed area is covered in Post-Swahili ceramics and Swahili-associated remnants. The northern edge of the property is flanked by a gravel road that runs between Muheza and Pangani.

A minor portion of the entire assemblage found at Muhembo is made up of beads and foreign ceramics. Less than 1.5% (n = 51) of the pottery that were excavated were foreign ceramics. There are ten types present there. Islamic monochromes with blue-green glaze make up five of these. Three further varieties are from the Middle East, but they are too damaged or incomplete to be positively identified. Chinese celadon represents the latter two examples. All of the recognisable pottery varieties may be found in pieces that are shaped like plates, open bowls, or even hemispherical bowls (the latter are Chinese) and date from the fourteenth to the seventeenth century.

Together, these archaeological artefacts show that Muhembo was inhabited from the fourteenth/fifteenth to the seventeenth/eighteenth centuries. This classification is supported by both the mosque type and Gramly's (1981) single radiocarbon date of 1449 C.E. Limited foreign ceramics and (mainly drawn) glass beads are present with Swahili and Post-Swahili pottery. The upper layers of excavation units 1 and 2 show some degree of overlap between Swahili and Post-Swahili artefacts. Given that the two traditions share several traits, such as ticks along vessel carinations, this might be expected.

The upper site stratum may have been disturbed due to the sloping nature of the site and local coconut producers. Daub clusters suggest the inhabitants lived in wattle-and-daub houses east and northeast of the main coral rag ruins (and a lack of them in excavation units 3 and 4). Remains found beside the murram pit also suggest occupation at a time comparable to somewhat earlier than the project excavations.

Despite likely consuming a large portion of their calories from agricultural items (millet, rice, and bananas), the inhabitants of the site were reliant on shellfish and other aquatic remains. By Post-Swahili times, diets may have been under stress (for instance, teeth hypoplasia). It emerges from the unearthed units that the inhabitants' meals mostly consisted of terrestrial and avian animals. Swahili open bowls with elaborate decorations may have been used in ceremonies, as seen at locations on Pemba Island. There are architectural remnants, brackish water fish and snail remains, an ivory artefact, a few chert and petrified wood artefacts, local and imported beads and ceramics, a ceramic bead grinder, and slag as proof of production and exchange at Muhembo.

Swahili Ware, subsequent indigenous ceramics, animal remains, imported ceramics (Islamic monochromes), and drawn glass beads are all on display on the site's surface. Beginning in the 1970s, the northern portion of the site was damaged by a murram pit dug to supply coral gravel for contemporary road development. The tombs at Bweni Ndogo (west of Bweni), which are south of the river, were built at the same time as Muhembo.

== Excavation ==
Gramly, carried out reconnaissance around Pangani Bay. He excavated a small test trench at Muhembo, a Swahili site, and wrote about his findings in a paper that was later published. From this trench, he extracted pottery, animal remains, and a few foreign artefacts, including glass beads. He also researched additional colonial sites, such as a German fort (on the promontory south of the river), European cemeteries, and infrastructure from colonial plantations, as well as other sections of the bay that were previously examined. However, he discovered Swahili ceramics and identified Muhembo as a substandard, regionally oriented complex from the fourteenth century.

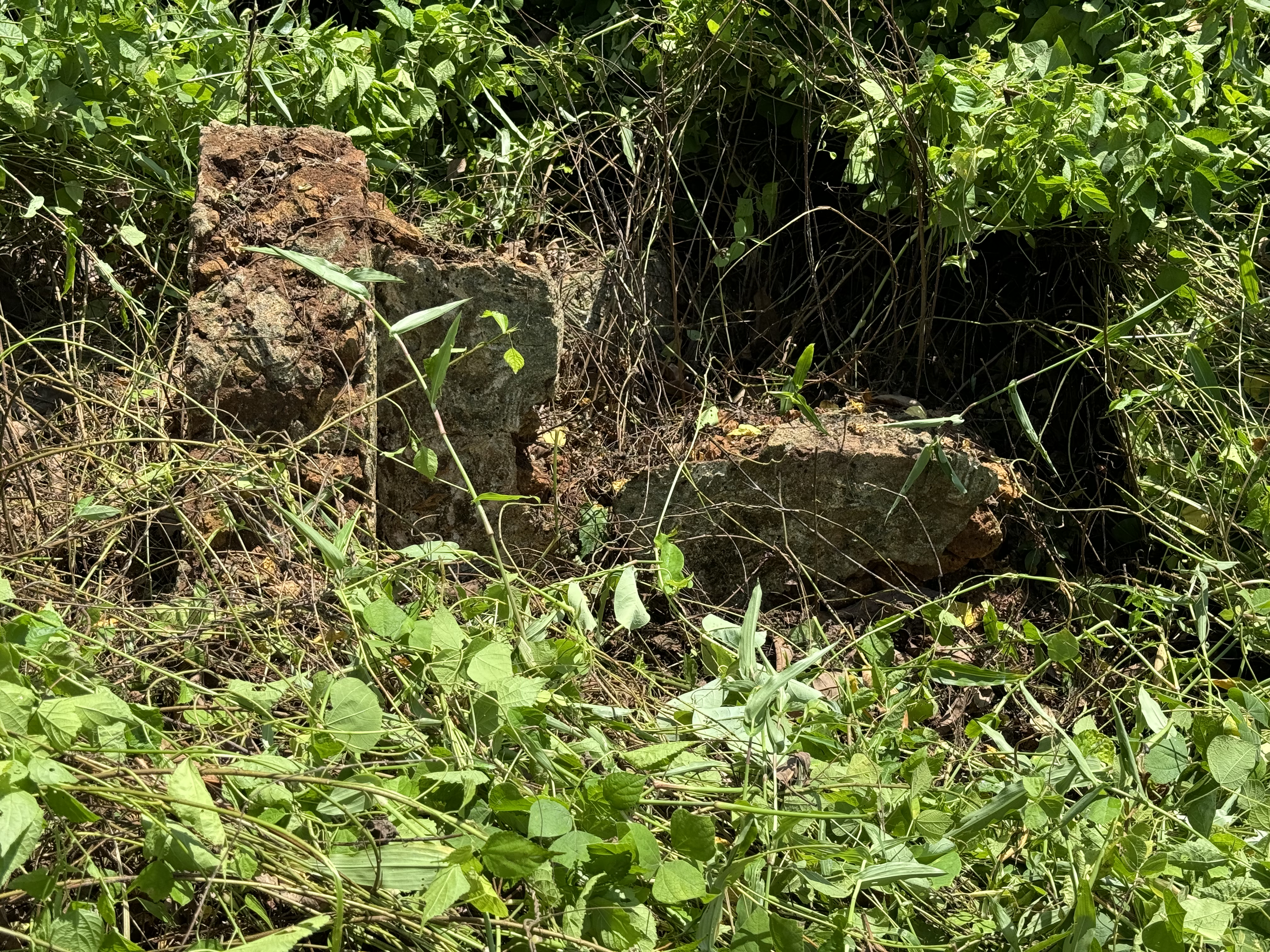
Grave at Historic Muhembo ruins, Pangani DC, Tanga Region

== See also ==
- Tongoni Ruins
- Historic Swahili Settlements
- National Historic Sites in Tanzania
- Swahili architecture
