= Mwera (ward) =

Ward in Pangani District, Tanga Region

Mwera Kata ya Mwera (Swahili)
- Ward
- Kata ya Mwera, Wilaya ya Pangani
- Location within Tanzania
- Country: Tanzania
- Region: Tanga Region
- District: Pangani District

Area
  - Total: 41 km^{2} (16 sq mi)
- Elevation: 52 m (171 ft)

Population (2012)
  - Total: 4,601
  - Density: 110/km^{2} (290/sq mi)

Ethnic groups
  - Settler: Swahili
  - Ancestral: Zigua
- Tanzanian Postal Code: 21304

Mwera is an administrative ward in Pangani District of Tanga Region in Tanzania. The ward covers an area of 41 km^{2} (16 sq mi), and has an average elevation of 52 m (171 ft). According to the 2012 census, the ward has a total population of 4,601.
