= Bushiri =

Ward in Pangani District, Tanga Region

Bushiri Kata ya Bushiri (Swahili)
- Ward
- Kata ya Bushiri, Wilaya ya Pangani
- Location within Tanzania
- Country: Tanzania
- Region: Tanga Region
- District: Pangani District

Area
  - Total: 249 km^{2} (96 sq mi)
- Elevation: 55 m (180 ft)

Population (2012)
  - Total: 4,750
  - Density: 19.1/km^{2} (49.4/sq mi)

Ethnic groups
  - Settler: Swahili & Makonde
  - Ancestral: Bondei & Zigua
- Tanzanian Postal Code: 21307

Bushiri is an administrative ward in Pangani District of Tanga Region in Tanzania. The ward covers an area of 249 km^{2} (96 sq mi), and has an average elevation of 55 m (180 ft). According to the 2012 census, the ward has a total population of 4,750. It is named in honor of Abushiri, a freedom fighter who led a revolt against the German colonizers of East Africa in 1888.

== See also ==
- Abushiri revolt
