= Watoro =

The word Watoro (singular Mtoro, from Swahili language verb kutoroka "to escape") references escaped slaves from West Africa during the 19th century. They established themselves in Tanzania, Kenya and Somalia.

== Sources ==
- The Structure of Slavery in Indian Ocean Africa and Asia, ISBN 9780714654867 (S. 61)
- Jan-Georg Deutsch: Emancipation Without Abolition in German East Africa, 2006, ISBN 9780852559857 (S. 75)
