= Zigula language =

Bantu language spoken in Tanzania and Somalia

Zigula
- Mushunguli
- Chizigula
- Native to: Tanzania, Somalia
- Ethnicity: Zigua, Mushungulu
- Native speakers: 480,000 (2009–2020)
- Language family: Niger–Congo?: Atlantic–Congo; Volta-Congo; Benue–Congo; Bantoid; Southern Bantoid; Bantu; Northeast Coast Bantu; Seuta; Zigula–Ngulu; Zigula
- Dialects: Mushunguli; Zigula
- Writing system: Latin

Language codes
- ISO 639-3: Either: ziw – Zigula xma – Mushungulu
- Glottolog: zigu1244
- Guthrie code: G.31,311
- ELP: Mushungulu

- People: Wazigula
- Language: Chizigula

The Zigula or Zigua language, Chizigua, is a Bantu language of Tanzania and Somalia, where the Mushunguli (or Mushungulu) dialect is spoken.

== Mushunguli ==
The Mushunguli or Mushungulu dialect is spoken by about 34,000 people from the Bantu ethnic minority of southern Somalia, in Jamaame, Kismayo, Mogadishu, and the Juba River valley.

Mushunguli shows affinities with adjacent Bantu varieties. In particular, it shares strong lexical and grammatical similarities with the language of the Zigua people who inhabit Tanzania, one of the areas in south-eastern Africa where many Bantu in Somalia are known to have been captured from as slaves during the 19th century. Ethnologue notes that the Mushunguli in Tanzania are the Wazegua.

Many Mushunguli Bantu men also speak as working languages the Afro-Asiatic Maay and Somali languages of their Somali neighbors.

== Phonology ==
There is no official or traditional orthography for Mushunguli. However, spelling practices from related Bantu languages can easily be adopted to render the language with minimal phonetic diacritics.

=== Vowels ===
	Front	Back
High	ɪ	ʊ
Mid	ɛ	ɔ
Open	a	

=== Consonants ===
		Labial	Alveolar	Palatal	Velar
Nasal		m	n	ɲ	ŋ
Plosive	plain	p	t	t͡ʃ	k
Plosive	implosive	ɓ	ɗ	ʄ	ɠ
Fricative	voiceless	f	θ ~ s	ʃ	
Fricative	voiced	v	ð ~ z		ɦ
Approximant		w	l	j	ɦ
Flap			ɾ		

The fricatives [z] and [s] freely vary with [ð] and [θ], respectively.

=== Tone ===
Vowel length is not distinctive, but phonetic length is especially associated with falling tones as in chîga 'leg'. The tone system is similar to that of Tanzanian Zigua.
