= Pangani Magharibi =

Ward in Pangani District, Tanga Region

Pangani Magharibi Ward Kata ya Pangani Magharibi (Swahili)
- Ward
- Kata ya Pangani Magharibi, Wilaya ya Pangani
- Location within Tanzania
- Country: Tanzania
- Region: Tanga Region
- District: Pangani District

Area
  - Total: 13 km^{2} (5.0 sq mi)
- Elevation: 20 m (66 ft)

Population (2012)
  - Total: 6,262
  - Density: 480/km^{2} (1,200/sq mi)

Ethnic groups
  - Settler: Swahili, Makonde, Bena, Arab and Indian
  - Ancestral: Bondei & Zigua
- Tanzanian Postal Code: 21302

Pangani Magharibi is an administrative ward in the Pangani District of the Tanga Region in Tanzania. The ward covers an area of 13 km^{2} (5.0 sq mi), and has an average elevation of 20 m (66 ft). According to the 2012 census, the ward has a population of 6,262.
