= Kimang'a =

Ward in Pangani District, Tanga Region

Kimang'a Kata ya Kimang'a (Swahili)
- Ward
- Kata ya Kimang'a, Wilaya ya Pangani
- Location within Tanzania
- Country: Tanzania
- Region: Tanga Region
- District: Pangani District

Area
  - Total: 30 km^{2} (12 sq mi)
- Elevation: 33 m (108 ft)

Population (2012)
  - Total: 3,876
  - Density: 130/km^{2} (330/sq mi)

Ethnic groups
  - Settler: Swahili & Makonde
  - Ancestral: Bondei
- Tanzanian Postal Code: 21305

Kimang'a is an administrative ward in Pangani District of Tanga Region in Tanzania. The ward covers an area of 30 km^{2} (12 sq mi), and has an average elevation of 33 m (108 ft). According to the 2012 census, the ward has a total population of 3,876.
