= Madanga, Pangani =

Ward in Pangani District, Tanga Region

Madanga Ward Kata ya Madanga (Swahili)
- Ward
- Kata ya Madanga, Wilaya ya Pangani
- Location within Tanzania
- Coordinates: 5°21′33.84″S 39°1′3.72″E
- Country: Tanzania
- Region: Tanga Region
- District: Pangani District

Area
  - Total: 26.4 km^{2} (10.2 sq mi)
- Elevation: 76 m (249 ft)

Population (2016)
  - Total: 3,606
  - Density: 137/km^{2} (354/sq mi)

Ethnic groups
  - Settler: Swahili & Makonde
  - Ancestral: Bondei
- Time zone: UTC+3 (EAT)
- Tanzanian Postal Code: 21306

Madanga is an administrative ward in Pangani District of Tanga Region in Tanzania. The ward covers an area of 26.4 km^{2} (10.2 sq mi), and has an average elevation of 76 m (249 ft).

In 2016 the Tanzania National Bureau of Statistics report there were 3,606 people in the ward, from 3,298 in 2012.
