= Zigua people =

Ethnic group from Tanga Region and Pwani Region of Tanzania

Zigua
Wazigua

Total population
- 134,406 (1957)

Regions with significant populations
- Tanzania (Kilindi District, Korogwe District, Handeni District, and Pangani District, Tanga Region and Chalinze District, Pwani Region)

Languages
- Kizigua & Swahili

Religion
- Majority Islam, Minority Christianity and African Traditional Religion

Related ethnic groups
- Zaramo, Luguru, Kutu Kami, Nguu, Kaguru, Somali Bantus & other coastal Bantu peoples and Afro Arabs

- Person: Mzigua
- People: Wazigua
- Language: Kizigua

The Zigua or in some sources Zigula are a Bantu ethnic and linguistic people inhabiting the southwestern Tanga Region and northern Pwani Region of Tanzania. In Tanga Region they are the majority in Handeni District and northern Kilindi District and also are a historically significant population south of the Pangani River in Pangani District. They speak the Zigula language. In 1993, the Zigua population was estimated to number 355,000 people, today they number 631,000 people.

The Zigua are considered to be the parent tribe of the Shambaa people, and the Bondei people which today all live in north-eastern Tanzania. For instance, the king Mbegha, who was to become the leader of the Shambaa people and the grandfather of the Shambaa ruler Kimweri ye Nyumbai (†1862), was born among the Zigua.

== Population and geographic distribution ==
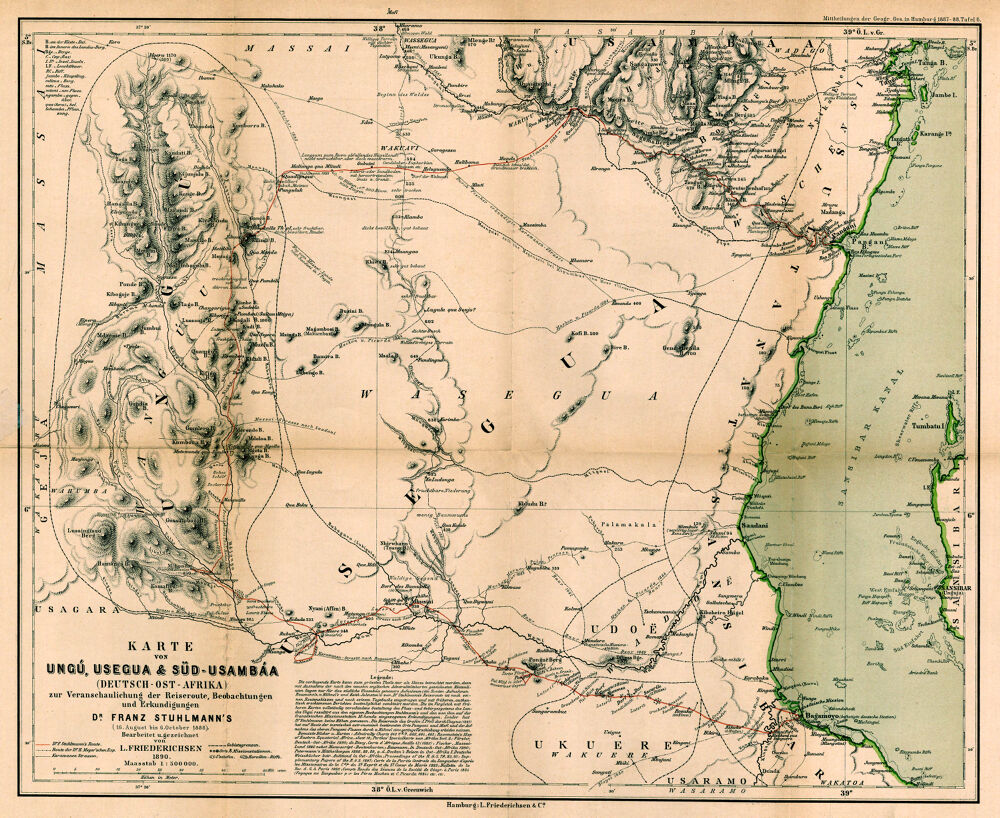
Map of Uzigua c.1888

Below 500 feet, the Eastern Zigula area is a low-lying coastal plain with a typical two-season wet climate with significant rainfall of around 50 inches. Compared to the nearby northern and western regions, the central and western Uzigula regions are over 1,000 feet high, with gently undulating hills, and have fewer streams and less reliable water supplies.

The Zigula had a population of about 134,406 in 1957. Western Pangani (5,048), southern Lushoto (1,722), eastern Handeni (64,703), southeastern Korogwe (19,145), and Tanga town (1,823) in the Tanga Region, as well as northern Morogoro (7,777) and western Bagamoyo (19,799) districts in the Eastern Region, are home to the majority of Zigula people. Over 4,500 square kilometres make up the Zigula tribal region. Although there is a dearth of precise demographic information, many Zigula people work as labourers and traders outside of their ancestral territories.

== History ==
=== Early history ===
The Ngulu and Zigula are closely related; many people believe that the Ngulu are just Zigula who fled to mountainous areas to avoid raids. Additionally, some Zigula claim affinity with the Bondei and Shambala communities. Some Luguru and Shambala leaders are thought to have had ties to the Zigula in the past. The majority of Zigula claim to have come from the north and were led by a hero named Seuta, who was well-known for his bow.

Although its exact importance is unknown, Mntambo mentions a notable fight known as "Breaking the grinding stone," which is a typical origin mythology among many matrilineal cultures. Although it sounds unlikely, he proposes that the Zigula might have come from the northern Galla regions of Somalia, a theory that is backed by some authorities like Grottanelli. The Zigula moved northward in the 1850s and frequently engaged in combat with the Shambala.

Historically, the Zigula people resided in fortified towns with lengthy, alley-like entrances. These settlements ranged in size from tiny communities of around thirty huts to bigger ones with up to two hundred. Due to repeated raids, the majority of settlements were palisaded; however, those on islands in the Ruvu River lacked defences and were only connected to the mainland by tiny wooden or string bridges, some of which were big enough to hold herds of sheep and goats.

Traditionally, matri-clan kin groupings were the focal point of these settlements. The Maasai and Baraguyu raided the region heavily in the 19th century for cattle, while the Zigula returned the favour by invading neighbours for slaves and animals. To get weapons and powder for these expeditions, they engaged in coastal trade. Some short-lived leaders, referred to as chiefs or zumbe, came to power by raiding, but their hold on power was frequently reliant on their ability to successfully bribe. Villages in the Ruvu Islands, on the other hand, continued to be more remote and autonomous politically. No single chief had ultimate power over all of Zigula, although some chiefs, like as Bwana Heri, who vanquished Arabs in 1882, ruled over sizable regions.

By exchanging gifts and paying tribute, the Zigula established alliances and frequently used oxen-based communal feasts to resolve conflicts. Depending on kinship and the situation, bloodwealth payments were occasionally used to settle blood feuds. Clans had always held the land, but it was unclear how this might be changed to facilitate military operations.

Communities provided labour and tribute to leaders or chiefs, while some also acquired food, animals, and slaves from nearby villages. Although there were powerful elders in communities, their ability to influence those outside of their own village hinged on their military prowess and connections. In order to enable raiding and commerce, chiefs frequently forged alliances or blood covenants with nearby peoples, such as the Maasai, Baraguyu, and Arabs. Traditionally, leadership was inherited and passed down from father to son.

Chiefs were consulted in homicide cases and were crucial in resolving blood conflicts. The victim's family received compensation, sometimes known as bloodwealth, from the offender's relatives. This amount varied depending on the circumstances, such as self-defence or unintentional homicide. Court processes, wherein fines or corporal punishment may be enforced, might also be used to settle disputes. In addition to forming alliances with tribes like the Nyamwezi and Sukuma primarily for economic purposes, the Zigula clans also maintained social relationships with neighbouring clans through utani, a light-hearted cooperation.

=== Shambaa Influence ===
In the 1830s, the Zigua people acquired firearms, occupied the Pangani valley, and presented a danger to the mountain empire. In 1857, Burton declared that "the watch-fire never leaves the mountain" and "the war-horn is now silent." Kimweri was reluctant to recognize the importance of firearms, but his border chiefs embraced them and attracted supporters from outside the nation. Kimweri governed a conservative kingdom from a mountain capital remote from the trade routes.

The Sambaa king at Vugha was recognized by the British as their overlord or paramount chief. As a result, the Shamba native government annexed the once independent Zigua headman. But in the interim, the majority of the Zigua—who resided in different districts—were united in 1928 to form a tribal federation. One gleefully exclaimed, "It was not like in the olden days of our ancestors when they met with furious faces ready for war." "Let all the Zigua descendants return and enter into the unity and become a nation," the Zigua people said, "so that our fellow Zigua people in various countries will hear that now Zigua has united into one nation." The Zigua under Kilindi authority were thus motivated to establish an organization "to protect their interests in the country of their adoption."

They asked for the valley lands' restitution in 1943, arguing that they had been a part of Uzigua before the German invasion. The British dismissed the plea on the basis of history after receiving advice from a hardly impartial missionary in Mlalo.

The Zigua were completely correct because their ancestors had taken control of the valley during Kimweri ya Nyumbai's declining years. Responses to nationalism in this region in the 1950s would be significantly influenced by the persistence of Zigua irredentism. Old conflicts were thus brought into modern politics, as in Usambara and Bonde, while African political philosophy and organization acquired the framework of colonial administration.

=== Colonial era ===
Firearms offered those who originally acquired them a short-term edge. The Zigua were the ones who initially acquired weapons and drove the Maasai from the lower Pangani valley by 1850, while the Arusha were the ones who did so in the upper valley. But as the First World War would demonstrate, muskets were primarily defensive weapons. With said weapons, Saadani was burned by the Zigua in the early 1850s.

The residents of the coastal hinterland were exposed to Islam. Many Segeju and Digo people converted to Islam. In the 1870s, missionaries discovered a sizable Islamic population in Bonde (Muheza). One person wrote that "there is a little mosque in almost every town" and "an Arab School in the larger ones." It is said that the Zigua converted the Bondei people to Islam in Bonde, and it is undeniable that Islam spread to Uzigua at this time.

One factor contributing to the German period's first widespread adoption of Islam by inland peoples was the fervor of Muslim teachers, particularly Qadiri Khulafa. In the past, there were Muslim communities in the country's commercial towns and among hinterland peoples like the Bondei and Zigua, and a few interior monarchs had converted to Islam or adopted an Islamic façade.

The three areas of deeper influence in German times were as follows: In the hinterland in the north, there was one breakthrough. By 1914, the Segeju were predominately Muslim, whereas the Bondei appeared to be split between Christians and Muslims, with the latter group being particularly prevalent in the east near the Tanga coast. As their position of power declined in Usambara, many Kilindi converted to Islam. Both coastal waalimu Islamic teachers and Shambaa were present there by 1913. Omari Mgaza, a Zigua Qadiri trained in Bagamoyo, is linked to the Zigua conversion. By 1914, the majority of Zigua were likely at least nominal Muslims, and the dhikr was said in a remote area that included migratory workers and traders. It embraces individuals who were becoming peasants due to their close proximity to the coast.

As Zigua claimed to be descended from Harun al-Rashid's warriors or, as some dynasties in the Southern Highlands claimed Arab ancestry, the adoption of Islam allowed people looking to connect their small-scale communities to the broader history of Islam. And it includes the political figures who were frequently Muslim pioneers because they interacted with the outside world the most and were therefore most exposed to its hazards. John Saidi, the Bondei apostle to the Zigua and a practicing Christian, was a former exorcist.

The land of the Zigua has been plagued by famines for most of its 19th century history due to the introduction of rinderpest by Europeans earlier in the century. "Great numbers of cattle have died in the last year or two from cattle disease, and I nowhere saw the vast herds which used to be such a striking feature of the Zigua country," wrote a missionary who was in Uzigua in 1907 while on a visit. Twenty years later, trypanosomiasis was endemic and cattle had all but vanished from Uzigua.

The German East African Company (DOG) sent out 18 trips to north eastern Tanzania between 1884 and 1886 to negotiate treaties with the powerful states there that would expand its territory. By April 1888, it had also built up 18 little trading and research stations on the mainland. These sparked a lot of animosity. The headman of Dunda, a village inland from Bagamoyo, requested that the Company close its outpost for fear that "at some point, white people will be masters of the land." At Korogwe, the Zigua protested against a station. Two stations at Uzaramo were assaulted in the beginning of 1887. Throughout 1886 and 1887, there was a lot of discussion about the prospect of resisting the Germans, especially by Saadani's monarch, Bwana Heri.

Informally formed in 1938 to raise money for a Zigua boarding school, Moyo wa Uzigua na Nguu, often known as "The Heart (or Spirit) of Uzigua and Ungulu," had deeper roots. One was the conflict between the inherited Muslim chiefs and the educated Christian Zigua. Another was the local economy's collapse after tsetse's invasion. The fall of the Pangani valley to Shambaa rule and the split of Uzigua among multiple British districts as the third factor gave Zigua tribalism a significant irredentist component. Moyo evolved into possibly the most active tribal betterment society in the nation. Its originator, a teacher by the name of Paul Nkanyemka, joined the tribal council with the support of the district office, and he was appointed council secretary.

However, just like the Sukuma Union, it had to deal with the challenge of defining the tribe in an area where various groups blended into one another almost invisibly. Moyo not only embraced Zigua and Ngulu—two distinct "tribes" on British lists—but also claimed kinship with the Bondei and Shamba, who are also thought to be decedents of Seuta. At the offices of the native administration, the provincial commissioner unveiled a clay statue of Seuta, the Zigua national hero in 1951. The figure was the creation of a Makerere student.

When Moyo first opened its doors to Seuta's descendants, it also pushed for the return of the lost Pangani valley, or Tambarare as it was known locally, from Shambaa to Zigua authority. In 1954, the Zigua established the Tambarare Citizens Union on the advice of counsel in order to "protect the interests of the people of the plains as against those of the hills." Moyo's campaign for the election of a Zigua paramount chief, meantime, exacerbated the conflict in Zigua relations with Shamba.

== Religion ==
The primary religious focus of the Zigula is ancestor worship, also known as kutambika mzimu or mviko, which entails appeasing ancestral spirits. They also believe in a supreme deity known as Chohile or Mlungu. Similar to the Kaguru, they also believe in woods spirits like kinyamkira, a malicious being with a single limb that delivers misery. It is believed that the spirits of the deceased (wazimu or pepo) live in the land of the spirits (uzimu) and have the power to affect the living if they are disregarded or if the living act inappropriately. To pay respect to both maternal and paternal ancestors, the Zigula construct little homes at crossroads in the forests.

Zigua are locally known as witches and sorcerers by neighboing tribes, they have a well-established reputation and occasionally consult rainmakers from Shambala. In the past, proved witches were burned, and it is thought that witches may change into animals. In order to determine whether a witch is guilty or innocent, they are recognised via divination and put through trials like licking a red-hot iron or drinking boiling water. Additionally, these tests can be used to settle disagreements or confirm veracity.

The Zigula believe in mgonzi, or magicians, who may practise sorcery, make remedies, and perform divination. They are frequently kept in horns or calabashes in homes or fields to ward off evil. Some small-scale magical and therapeutic practices, such as charms for love, sterility, thievery, and the evil eye, are clearly influenced by Islam.

They follow two cults in common with nearby groups:

- Kisasa: An outdoor healing ritual involving fire, killed chickens, singing, and the use of kudu horns for people thought to be afflicted by ancestor spirits. Through their personal healing experiences, participants could develop into experts.
- Upungi: also known as ukungwi, is a Kwere custom of diagnosing ailments brought on by ghosts occupying the living by using a medicine bundle made up of the body parts of a departed healer. Although the specifics of the ritual are unclear, libations are made in the bush to drive out the ghost.

They celebrate the first fruits every year with an event called Mviko wa Mlungu, where beer and grain are libated around a bush mkongo tree. Islam has surpassed Christianity, which is primarily Roman Catholic, and many Zigula are now Muslims.

== Traditional lifestyle ==
The Zigula are mostly farmers who keep small herds of sheep, goats, and cattle in addition to a few donkeys for trading products. They used to keep more cattle, but they stopped rigorous herding because of frequent Masai and Baraguyu assaults. Bananas are uncommon among their crops, which also include sorghum, maize, beans, yams, manioc, pumpkins, cucumbers, sesame, groundnuts, tobacco, Indian hemp, castor, and coconuts. During droughts, their main crops are manioc, beans, maize, and sorghum. They hunt and fish, and at night they raise hens in wicker cages.

The Zigula have traditionally undertaken lengthy inland trading journeys and still engage in considerable commerce with nearby communities. They apparently farmed extra grain to sell along the shore, and traders saw the profusion of coastal trade products among them in the 1890s. Tobacco, which they had previously received from Shambala, was traded for fabric, beads, brass coils, gunpowder, and weaponry. In several areas of Uzigula, pre-colonial marketplaces were created.

Maize is harvested in late October or early November, and sorghum is harvested in July. Usually, crops are sown in January, right before the major rainy season. They concentrate on trading and ceremonial events between September and January, when work is less demanding. Because of the lack of well-watered valley areas and the restricted rainfall, their farming is not very intense. Wooden mortars and pestles or grinding stones are used to process grain.

=== Dress and crafts ===
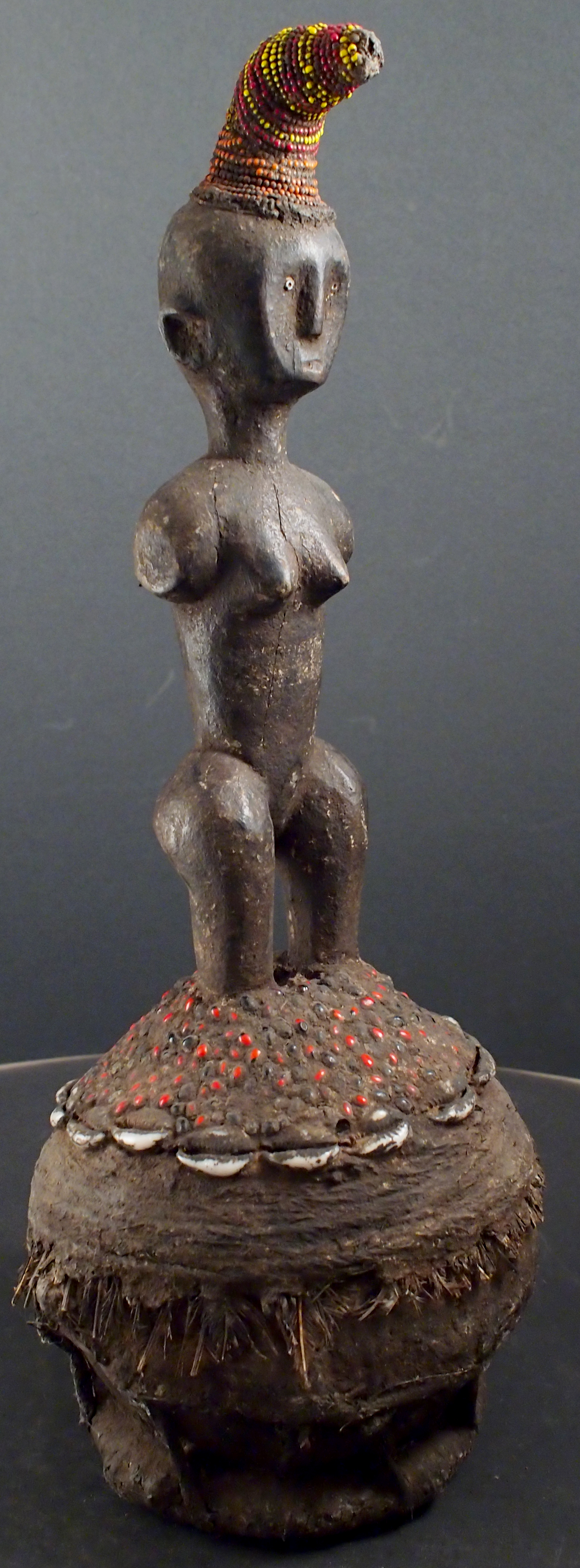
A sacred Zigua dolls with beaded headdress on a decorated calabash, c.1890s)

The Zigula are renowned for their ability to weave baskets and mats and to carve wood. Swords, clubs, arrows, bows, drums, waterpipes, melodic bows, stools, and other implements were among the weapons they made themselves. They also hunted with arrow poison and were expert blacksmiths, working with metal using hand-bellows.

Traditionally, the front teeth of both sexes were chipped into a triangle. Women extended their earlobes to fit wooden or horn discs, while males usually wore loincloths made of fabrics, animal skins, or shredded bark. Young females wore tiny beaded aprons around their genitalia. As a result of early coastal influences, the Zigula now dress in more contemporary ways akin to those of the Swahili.

=== Birth rites ===
In the past, the community frequently practiced infanticide to get rid of infants that were deemed unlucky (vigego) or forbidden (mwiko), since they were seen to pose a threat to the settlement's stability. If a child caused serious disease to their mother during pregnancy or birth, or if the child was early, blind, malformed, delivered during the appearance of a comet, or out of wedlock (though this last point is debatable), the midwife may strangle the child. Children who were born breech or with specific birth defects, such a boy's left arm appearing first or a girl's right arm emerging first, were also slain.

Following delivery, the mother and infant were confined indoors for a few days, usually four to six, during which the parents' and midwife's necks were anointed with oil and the kid's body was anointed. Once outdoors, the kid was given a name, usually derived from the father's ancestors. Although this story is a little unclear and could be related to other birth bans regarding birth medications, a woman might let a topknot (chungi) grow until the kid was named. It was common for children to be named after their fathers. A kid was deemed weird and either killed by their joking partners (watani) or given to slavers if they cut their upper teeth first, or their canines or molars before the incisors.

Special drugs called ndaa were used to promote regular teething, and childcare entailed certain routines. The infant was given a kweme-bean before birth and was thereafter eligible to receive breast milk. A wild tomato and a gore-tree stick were placed in the doorway of the house where the birth had taken place.

=== Initiation ===
==== Boys ====
Although some sources indicate that youngsters may be circumcised earlier, the Zigula community generally circumcises boys at puberty. Some Muslim boys are said to have had circumcision before to puberty, and when they get closer to puberty, they enrol in initiation rituals. Nonetheless, the majority of Zigula adhere to a same ritual for circumcision and initiation, irrespective of their religious affiliations—Pagan, Christian, or Muslim. The circumcision is referred to by Baxter as ''mwaliko wa kavu or ngasu. A professional (mkunga or msano) performs circumcision on a novice, known as mnkinda or mwali, at initiation.

The young men are given riddles, songs, and clay figures to teach them about sexual knowledge and appropriate adult behaviour during the three to four months following the treatment. They smear themselves with white mud and dress in bark fabric from moza or mtondoro trees. They are not allowed to be around females at this time. As a sign of initiation, they get slashes (chanje) on their hands before to re-entering society (ndege ya mwaliko). with a ritual known as kwaluka, they are then shaved, anointed with castor oil, clothed with new clothes, and honoured with a dance, feast, and beer.

==== Girls ====
A female is confined for many months to a year once she hits puberty. She had a labiadectomy (mnkinda) at this time, and under the guidance of a unique teacher known as a kungwe, she learns about sexual behaviour through songs, riddles, and clay figures. After completing her initiation, she is marked as ready for marriage by taking part in a rite that involves breaking a winnowing tray, dancing called kisazi, and celebrating with a feast.

=== Marriage ===
According to Dundas, virgins normally receive more bridewealth, daughters often marry according to age, and some girls are engaged before they even start menstruating. The Zigula are polygynistic, and suitors may abduct a girl to get her agreement, which may lead to smaller bridewealth payments. Elders negotiate the bridewealth, and the night before payment, a cock is killed, its head roasted, and consumed by the groom to increase his energy. Additionally, the groom uses a msasa tree in rites. He goes to the bride's village with his grandfather and a close friend, where elders from both sides talk about the bridewealth.

Dundas reported that the groom waits for the bride to arrive at her grandmother's hut while perched atop a pestle or mortar. The bride delivers the beads to her mother when he offers them to her. The bride's grandma forces the couple to undress, sit with their legs crossed in front of one another, and then douses them in water. To consummate the marriage, they are then imprisoned in the grandmother's home for three days. Both are then instructed by their parents, and the groom moves back into the bride's village. Historically, Zigua marriages were usually uxorilocal (living with the wife's family), bridewealth was paid in installments, and the bride's maternal kin were frequently involved more than her paternal kin.

=== Furneral rites ===
In the village, people usually don't work when someone dies, though Picarda says they might go hunting, which doesn't seem realistic. Sometimes the body is buried, and other times it is left in the jungle at a location known as Kwaluhombwa for wild animals to devour. Joking partners (watani) oversee the deceased's care and burial. When a grave is excavated, two stones are thrown into it by the deceased's father and maternal relatives.

Following the conclusion of mourning, the Watani engage in a purifying ceremony known as mpoza, which entails the use of a plant known as ukongo and the stomach contents of a slaughtered goat or cow. The offal is smeared on all mourners, or maybe just the oldest kid. The deceased individual is regarded as an ancestor ghost (mzimu) when the grieving period is over. The watani frequently demand money at the conclusion of the funeral ceremonies, and they may even threaten to take items or refuse to leave the tomb unless they receive payment.
