= Tanga Bay =

Coastal bay in Tanzania

- Ghuba la Tanga (Swahili)
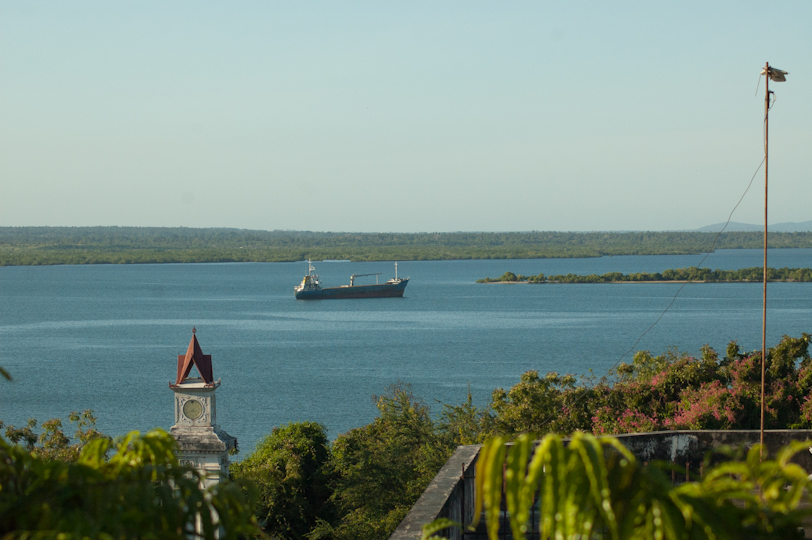
- Tanga Bay from Central

- Location in Tanzania
- Location: Tanzania, Tanga Region, Tanga City Council
- Group: Pemba Channel
- Coordinates: 5°02′25″S 39°06′53″E
- Type: Bay
- Etymology: Tanga
- River sources: Sigi River & Mkulumuzi River
- Ocean/sea sources: Indian Ocean
- Designation: Protected waterbody
- Max. length: 11 km (6.8 mi)
- Max. width: 2.8 km (1.7 mi)
- Islands: Tanga Island & Ulenge Island
- Settlements: Tanga

Tanga Bay (Ghuba la Tanga, in Swahili) is a bay in Mkinga District of Tanga Region of Tanzania. The bay is home to Tanga Island and is surrounded in the north by Chongoleani ward, west by Mabokweni and Mzizima wards. To the south is Central and Chumbageni wards. The archaeological survey of the area demonstrated that the Tanga Bay and Amboni Caves regions offer sites worth funding for future excavations. It's probable that the ancient trading hub of Toniki, which the Ptolemy claimed to be in latitude 4 South, was situated in the study region.
