= Makatumbe Front Range Lighthouse =

- Location: Dar es Salaam, Tanzania
- Coordinates: 6°47′43.8″S 39°19′53.4″E

Tower
- Foundation: concrete piles
- Construction: metal skeletal tower
- Height: 15 metres (49 ft)
- Shape: pyramidall skeletal tower with balcony and lantern
- Markings: white tower
- Operator: Tanzania Ports Authority

Light
- Focal height: 15 metres (49 ft)
- Characteristic: Q W

The Makatumbe Front Range Lighthouse (also known as Dar es Salaam Bay Range Front or Inner Makatumbe lighthouse) is located on the island of Inner Makatumbe close to the coast of Dar es salaam, Tanzania and South-West of the island of Outer Makatumbe. The lighthouse works in conjunction with the Makatumbe RR and assists ships entering the Kivukoni channel.

The lighthouse is not really located on the island of Inner Makatumbe but just north of the coast of the island. The lighthouse is metal structure mounted on a square platform with a triangular day mark.

== See also ==
- List of lighthouses in Tanzania
