= Tanga Island Rear Range Lighthouse =

Tanga Island Rear Range Light
- Location: Tanga; Tanzania
- Coordinates: 5°3′44.7″S 39°6′46.5″E

Tower
- Construction: concrete tower
- Height: 12 metres (39 ft)
- Shape: cylindrical tower
- Markings: white tower
- Operator: Tanzania Ports Authority

Light
- Focal height: 12 metres (39 ft)
- Range: 8 nautical miles (15 km; 9.2 mi)
- Characteristic: Fl W 7s.

The Tanga Island Rear Range Lighthouse is located in the northeastern city of Tanga in Tanzania.

== See also ==
- List of lighthouses in Tanzania
