= Ras Kazone Rear Range Lighthouse =

- Location: Tanga; Tanzania
- Coordinates: 5°3′16.4″S 39°7′17.4″E

Tower
- Construction: concrete tower
- Height: 13 metres (43 ft)
- Shape: cylindrical tower with port control room, balcony and signal mast

Light
- Deactivated: 2008

The Ras Kazone Rear Range Lighthouse is located in Tanga Region in northeastern Tanzania.

== See also ==
- List of lighthouses in Tanzania
