= Matumbi Lighthouse =

- Location: Pemba; Tanzania
- Coordinates: 5°24′14.8″S 39°33′52.7″E

Tower
- Construction: stone tower
- Height: 31 metres (102 ft)
- Shape: square tower withbalcony and lantern
- Markings: red and white horizontal bands tower

Light
- Focal height: 33 metres (108 ft)
- Light source: solar power
- Range: 16 nautical miles (30 km; 18 mi)
- Characteristic: Fl (3) W 20s.

The Matumbi Lighthouse is located at the south western tip of Matumbwi Makubwa Island in Pemba, Tanzania. The lighthouse is on a small island called Matumbi Makubwa. The lighthouse's construction history is unknown, however, the 31m square stone tower was renovated in 2002 by Salem Construction limited from Zanzibar.

== See also ==
- List of lighthouses in Tanzania
