= Tanga Entrance Lighthouse =

Lighthouse in Tanzania

- Location: Tanga; Tanzania
- Coordinates: 5°3′15″S 39°7′34.9″E

Tower
- Construction: concrete tower
- Height: 11 metres (36 ft)
- Shape: cylindrical tower
- Markings: white tower
- Operator: Tanzania Ports Authority

Light
- Focal height: 11 metres (36 ft)
- Characteristic: Fl R 2.5s.

The Tanga Entrance Lighthouse is located in Tanga Region in northeastern Tanzania.

== See also ==
- List of lighthouses in Tanzania
