= Ulenge Island =

Protected island and marine reserve in Tanga Region of Tanzania

- IUCN category II (national park)
- Location within Tanzania
- Location: Tanzania, Tanga Region, Tanga District
- Nearest city: Tanga
- Coordinates: 5°0′28″S 39°9′42″E
- Length: 1.0 km (0.62 mi)
- Width: 0.2 km (0.12 mi)
- Established: 2010
- Governing body: Marine Parks & Reserves Authority (Tanzania)
- Website: Tanga Marine Reserves System

Ulenge Island officially, Ulenge Island Marine Reserve (Kisiwa cha Hifadhi Akiba cha Ulenge, in Swahili) is a protected, seasonally inhabited island in the Tanga Bay of Pemba Channel under the Tanga Marine Reserves (TMRS) with the IUCN category II located within Tanga City Council of Tanga Region in Tanzania. Kwale Island and Ulenge Island are the only islands in the marine reserve that are seasonally inhabited. Of Tanga's whole marine reserves system, Ulenge Island is the most degraded. Ulenge's reefs had the lowest fish numbers and the lowest coral cover and species diversity (5-7%, 16 coral genera). This is mostly because Tanga Bay and Tanga City Council are nearby, which has a greater negative human impact. Ulenge Island is nicknamed by English speakers as Bird Island due to its importance as a seabird sanctuary.

== History ==
The Swahili people from the north, led by Chief Mwinyi Ulenge, are said to have been the initial inhabitants of Ulenge Island. They were compelled to travel to the mainland due to a water deficit on the island. The majority of them relocated to Chongoleani ward of Tanga city. The island is also the location of two of Tanga's most famous lighthouses; the Ulenge Island Front Range Lighthouse and the Ulenge Island Rear Range Lighthouse.

== Geography and ecology ==
The primary biotope at Ulenge Island Marine Reserve is mangrove vegetation. Despite the presence of all mangrove species, species with robust root systems, such as Rhizophora mucronata and Sonneratia alba, predominate. Numerous plant (trees and grass) and animal (unstudied) populations can be found on Ulenge Island. Daily tidal wash through in the mangrove ecosystem on Ulenge results in a relatively thin layer of silt buildup.

According to Birdlife International, the Ulenge and Kwale Island Marine Reserves are located in IBM 35, an important bird region. This bird area contains a diverse range of bird species, including Greater Sand Plover, Curlew Sandpiper, Crab Plover, migrating waders, and many more. Despite being threatened by human activity and climate change-related reasons, mangroves and coral reefs are not actually in danger.

On the west and south of Ulenge Island, the intertidal zone is longer (up to 800 m), while it is shorter (50–350 m) on the seaward side. North of Ulenge Island, the intertidal is rock, with large algae mats in the lower intertidal zones. On the lower intertidal zone on the seaward side, algae mats were also discovered. Along the Ulenge-Kwale channel, beyond the algal mats, to the south and south-west of Ulenge (in Tanga Bay), and in the lower intertidal zones of Kwale Bay, one can see seagrass beds.

Turbidity and bottom sediment type, which are regulated by rainfall/river discharge patterns and oceanic conditions, determine the amount and distribution of seagrass. On the seaward side, coral reefs are few. The results of the manta tow and swimming benthic cover surveys showed a relatively small area of patchy coral reefs that were stressed by sediments from Tanga Bay and nearby rivers. In most of the Ulenge Island waters, there was less than 10% coral cover.
