= Ras Kigomasha Lighthouse =

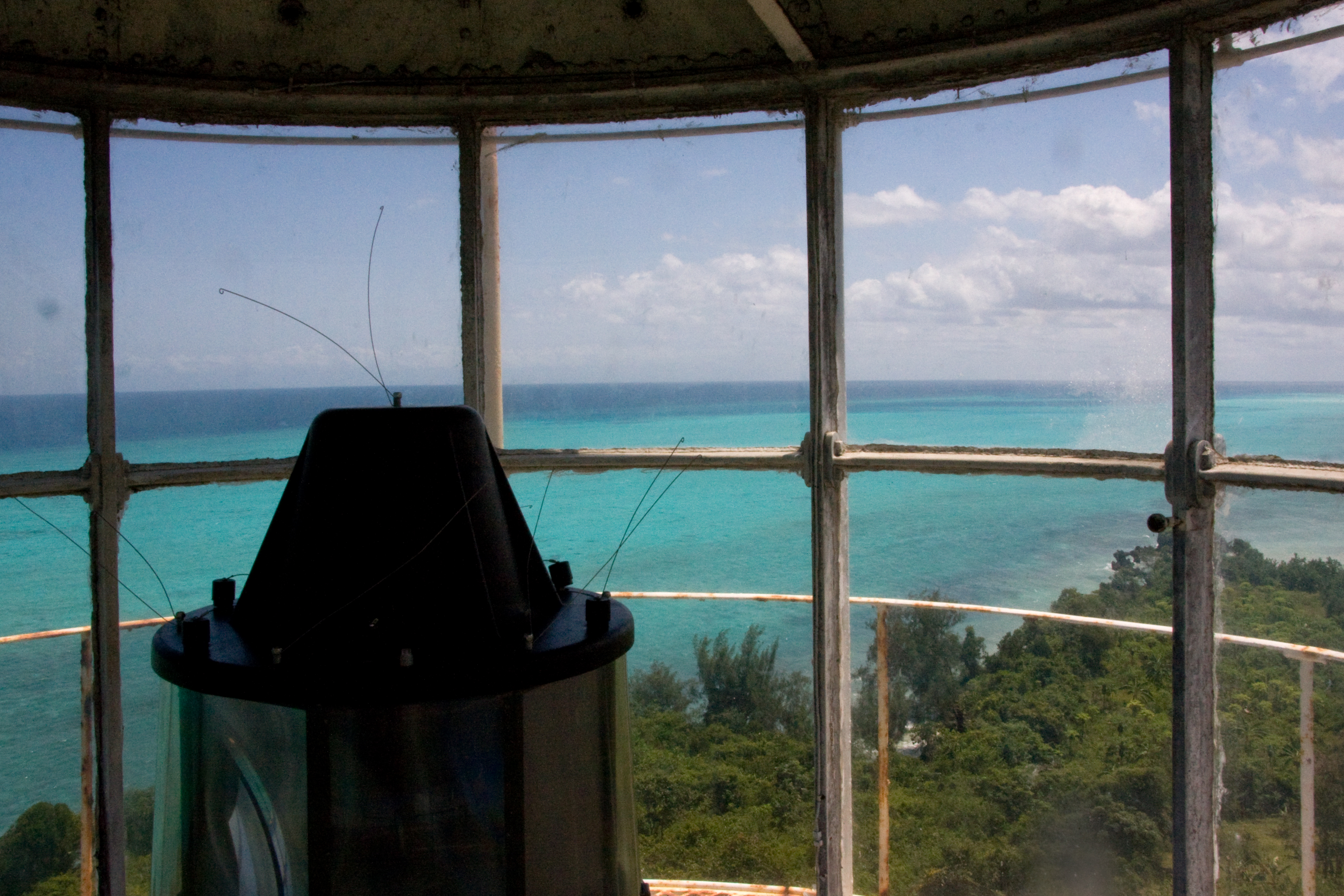
- Location: Pemba; Tanzania
- Coordinates: 4°52′22.2″S 39°40′41.9″E

Tower
- Constructed: 1904 (first); 2002 (renovated)
- Construction: skeletal cast iron tower
- Height: 27 metres (89 ft)
- Shape: hexagonal pyramidal skeletal tower with lantern and gallery
- Markings: white tower

Light
- Focal height: 38 metres (125 ft)
- Range: 16 nautical miles (30 km; 18 mi)
- Characteristic: Fl (4) W 24s.

The Ras Kigomasha Lighthouse is located at the north western tip of Pemba, in Tanzania. It is an entirely cast iron structure and was built in 1904 by The Chance Brothers Ltd from Birmingham. The light house has a 1-storey keepers house and is still operational.

== Gallery ==
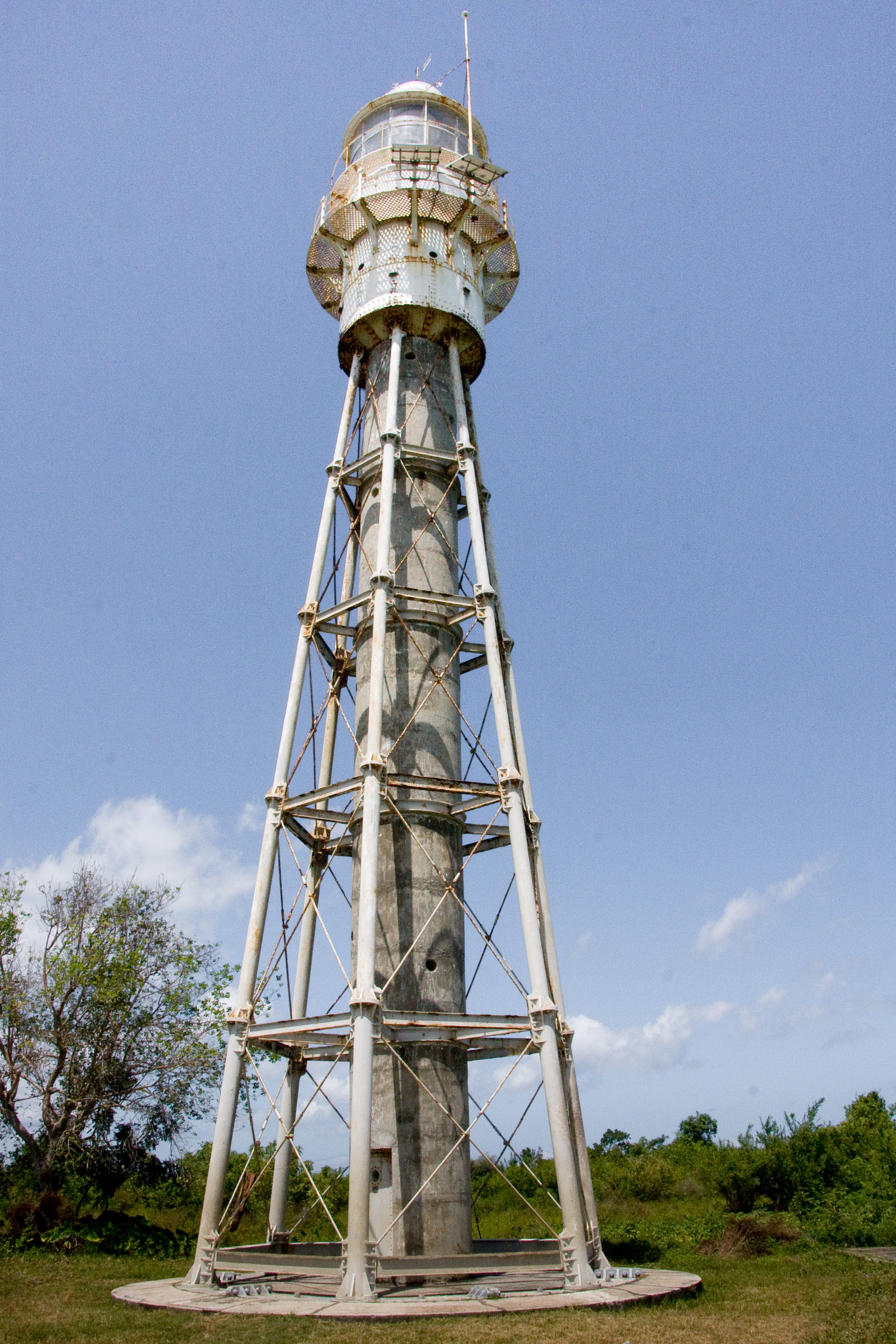

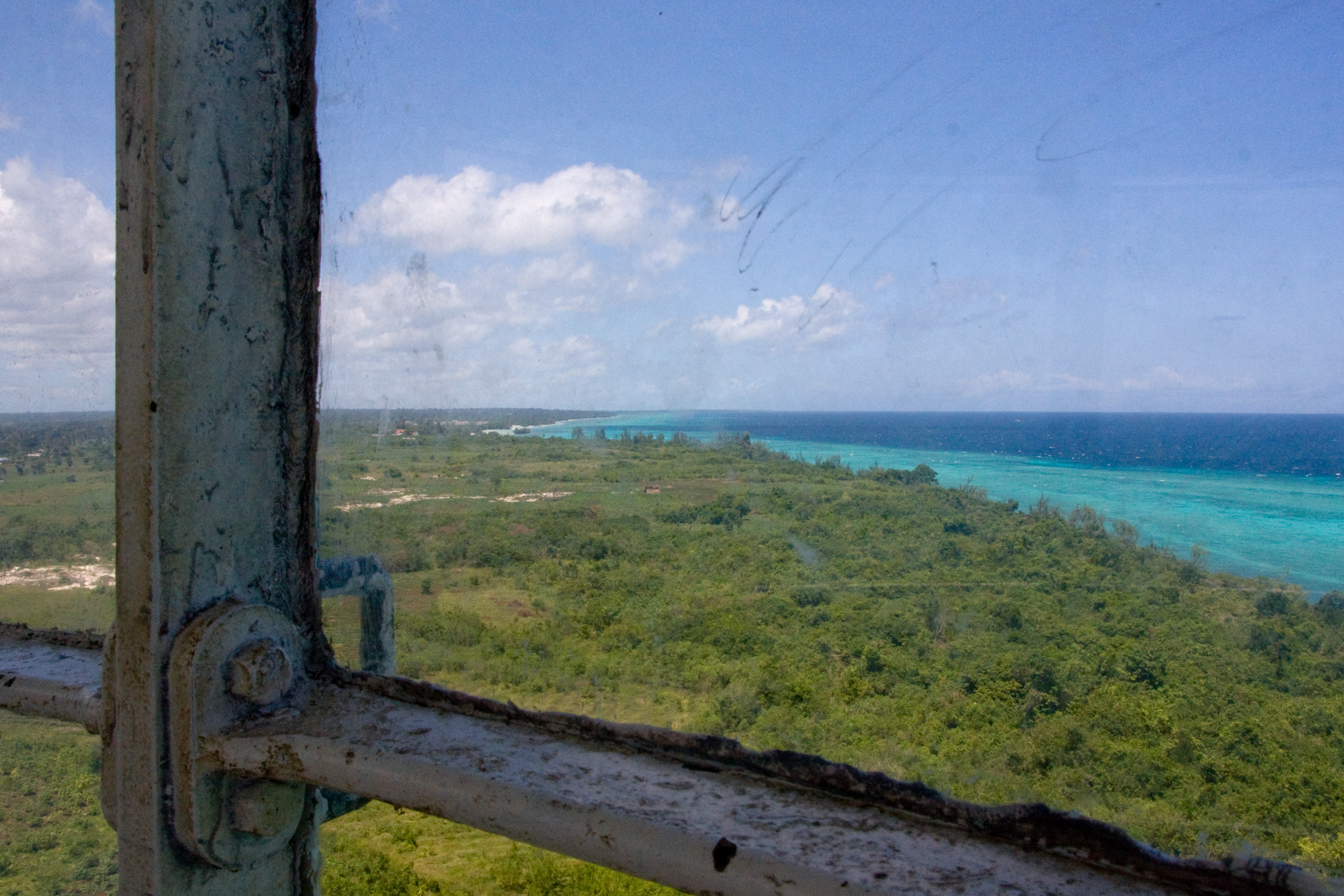

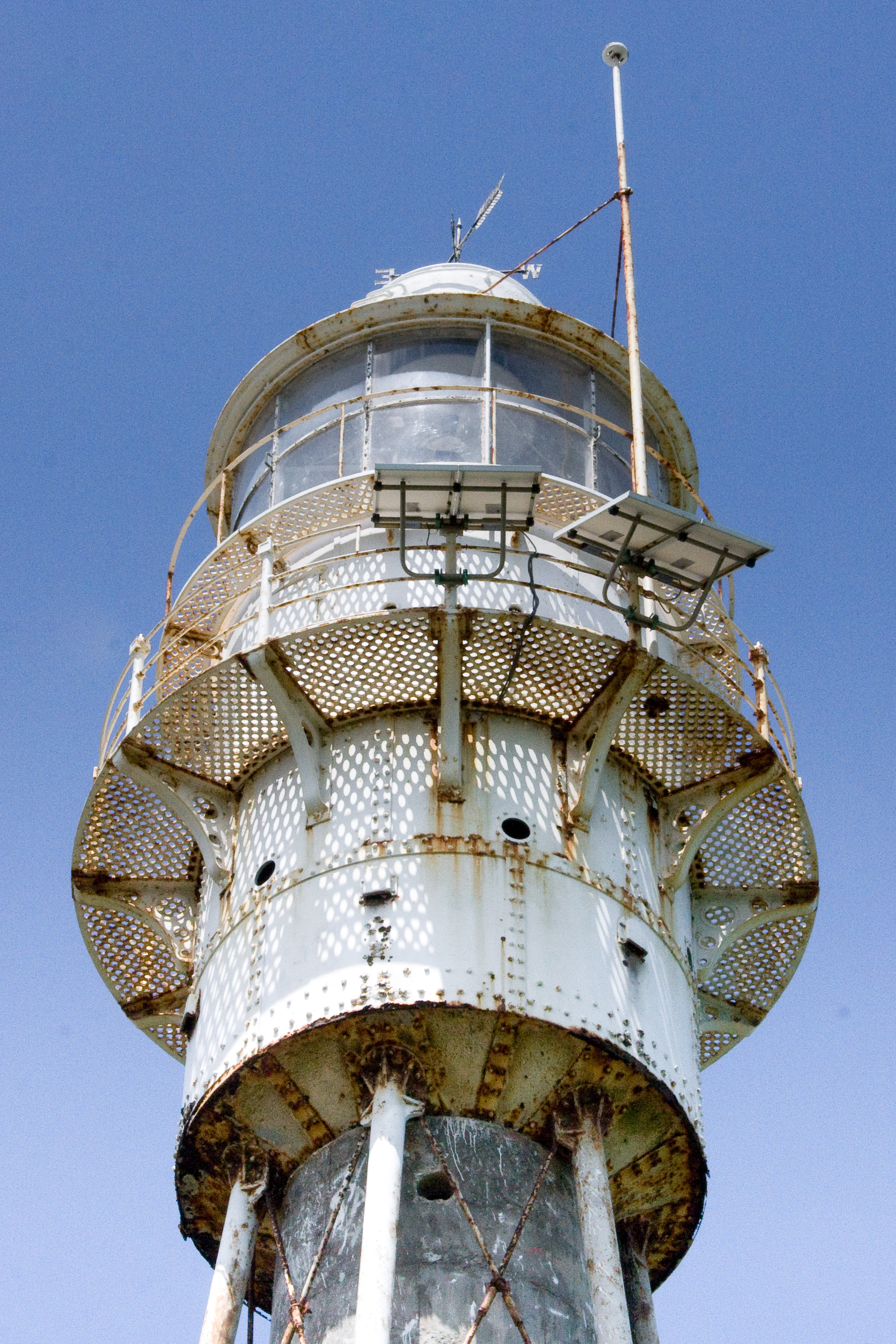

== See also ==
- List of lighthouses in Tanzania
