= Pungume Lighthouse =

- Location: Pungume Island; Zanzibar; Tanzania
- Coordinates: 6°26′14.4″S 39°20′27″E

Tower
- Constructed: 1919
- Construction: stone tower
- Height: 22 metres (72 ft)
- Shape: square tower with balcony and lantern
- Markings: white and black horizontal bands

Light
- Focal height: 26 metres (85 ft)
- Range: 15 nautical miles (28 km; 17 mi)
- Characteristic: Fl W 3s.

The Pungume Lighthouse is located on Pungume Island at the south western tip of the Zanzibar Archipelago, in Tanzania. The Lighthouse is a squared stone tower recently painted with black and white stripes. The lighthouse is an important one as it shines into the channel where ships enter the Stone Town harbor. The lighthouse is managed and operated by the Zanzibar Ports Corporation.

== See also ==
- List of lighthouses in Tanzania
