= Nguvumali =

Ward in Tanga City Council, Tanga Region

Nguvumali Kata ya Nguvumali (Swahili)
- Ward of Tanga City Council
- From top to bottom
- Interactive map of Nguvumali
- Coordinates: 5°4′40.44″S 39°4′39.72″E
- Country: Tanzania
- Region: Tanga Region
- District: Tanga City Council

Area
  - Total: 5.7 km^{2} (2.2 sq mi)

Population (2012)
  - Total: 15,133

Ethnic groups
  - Settler: Swahili
  - Ancestral: Digo & Segeju
- Tanzanian Postal Code: 21112

Nguvumali (Kata ya Nguvumali, in Swahili) is an administrative ward in Tanga City Council of Tanga Region in Tanzania. Chumbageni and Kiomoni form the northern and southern borders of the ward. Majengo forms the eastern boundary of the ward. Mwanzange lies to the south, while Maweni Ward is to the west. The ward covers an area of 5.7 km^{2} (2.2 sq mi), and has an average elevation of 26 m (85 ft). According to the 2012 census, the ward has a total population of 15,133.

== Administration ==
The postal code for Nguvumali Ward is 21112. The ward is divided into the following neighborhoods (Mitaa):

- Dairy
- Gofu Juu "A"
- Gofu Juu "B"
- Kagera
- Kwaminchi

- Majani Mapana "A"
- Majani Mapana "N"
- Nguvumali "A"
- Nguvumali "B"
- Old Nguvumali

=== Government ===
The ward, like every other ward in the country, has local government offices based on the population served.The Nguvumali Ward administration building houses a court as per the Ward Tribunal Act of 1988, including other vital departments for the administration the ward. The ward has the following administration offices:

- Nguvumali Police Station
- Nguvumali Government Office (Afisa Mtendaji)
- Nguvumali Tribunal (Baraza La Kata) is a Department inside Ward Government Office

In the local government system of Tanzania, the ward is the smallest democratic unit. Each ward is composed of a committee of eight elected council members which include a chairperson, one salaried officer (with no voting rights), and an executive officer. One-third of seats are reserved for women councillors.

== Demographics ==
Like much of the district, the ward is the ancestral home of the Digo people and Segeju.

== Education and health ==
=== Education ===
The ward is home to these educational institutions:

- Nguvumali Primary School
- Mbuyuni Primary School
- Gofu Juu Primary School
- Majani Mapana Primary School
- Nguvumali Secondary School

=== Healthcare ===
The ward is home to the following health institutions:

- Nguvumali Health Center
