= Marubi Palace Gardens Range Rear Lighthouse =

- Location: Unguja; Zanzibar Archipelago; Tanzania
- Coordinates: 6°9′21.1″S 39°12′23.5″E

Tower
- Construction: stone and metal skeletal tower
- Height: 13 metres (43 ft)
- Shape: square pyramidal skeletal tower
- Markings: white tower
- Operator: Zanzibar Ports Corporation

Light
- Focal height: 28 metres (92 ft)
- Range: 8 nautical miles (15 km; 9.2 mi)
- Characteristic: Iso W 6s.

The Marubi Palace Gardens Range Rear Lighthouse is located in the Marubi Palace Gardens in Stone Town, Zanzibar, Tanzania. The lighthouse is located to support ships trying to dock at the Stone Town harbor.

== See also ==
- List of lighthouses in Tanzania
