= Ulenge Island Rear Range Lighthouse =

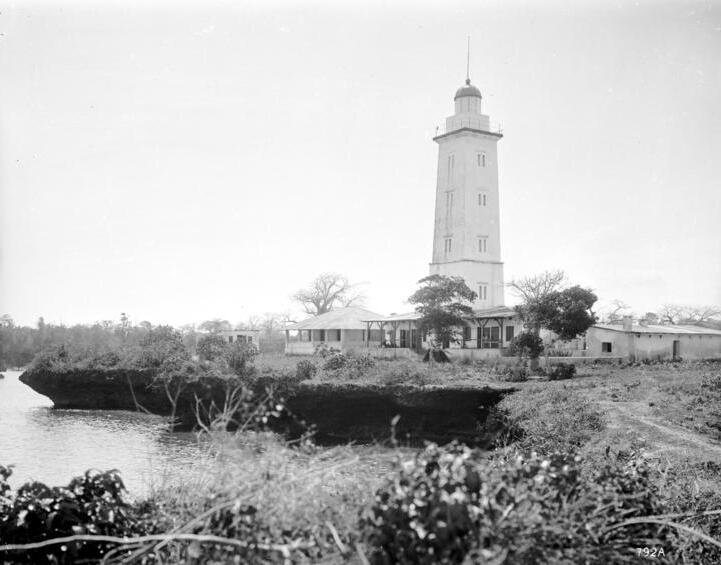
- Location: Ulenge Island, Tanga Region, Tanzania
- Coordinates: 5°00′17″S 39°09′59″E

Tower
- Constructed: 1894
- Construction: stone
- Height: 26 m (85 ft)
- Shape: square tower with balcony and lantern
- Markings: White (tower), black (stripe)

Light
- Deactivated: 2008
- Focal height: 28 m (92 ft)

The Ulenge Island Rear Range Lighthouse is a historic lighthouse on Ulenge Island in the Pemba Channel under the Tanga Marine Reserves (TMRS) with the IUCN category II located within Tanga City Council of Tanga Region in Tanzania.

== See also ==
- List of lighthouses in Tanzania
