= Kiungani Rear Range Lighthouse =

- Location: Unguja; Zanzibar Archipelago; Tanzania
- Coordinates: 6°10′51.9″S 39°12′17.3″E

Tower
- Construction: stone tower
- Height: 13 metres (43 ft)
- Shape: square tower with balcony and lantern
- Markings: white tower
- Operator: Zanzibar Ports Corporation

Light
- Focal height: 40 metres (130 ft)
- Range: 8 nautical miles (15 km; 9.2 mi)
- Characteristic: Fl W 6s.

The Kiungani Rear Range Lighthouse is located in Stone Town, Zanzibar, Tanzania. The lighthouse is located alongside Nyerere Road and provides support for ships trying to dock at the Stone Town harbor.

== See also ==
- List of lighthouses in Tanzania
