= Ulenge Island Front Range Lighthouse =

- Location: Ulenge Island; Tanga; Tanzania
- Coordinates: 5°0′24.3″S 39°10′03.7″E

Tower
- Construction: concrete tower
- Height: 15 metres (49 ft)
- Shape: cylindrical tower

Light
- First lit: 1929
- Deactivated: 2008

The Ulenge Island Front Range Lighthouse is a historic lighthouse on Ulenge Island in the Pemba Channel under the Tanga Marine Reserves (TMRS) with the IUCN category II located within Tanga City Council of Tanga Region in Tanzania.

== See also ==
- List of lighthouses in Tanzania
