= Makatumbe Range Rear Lighthouse =

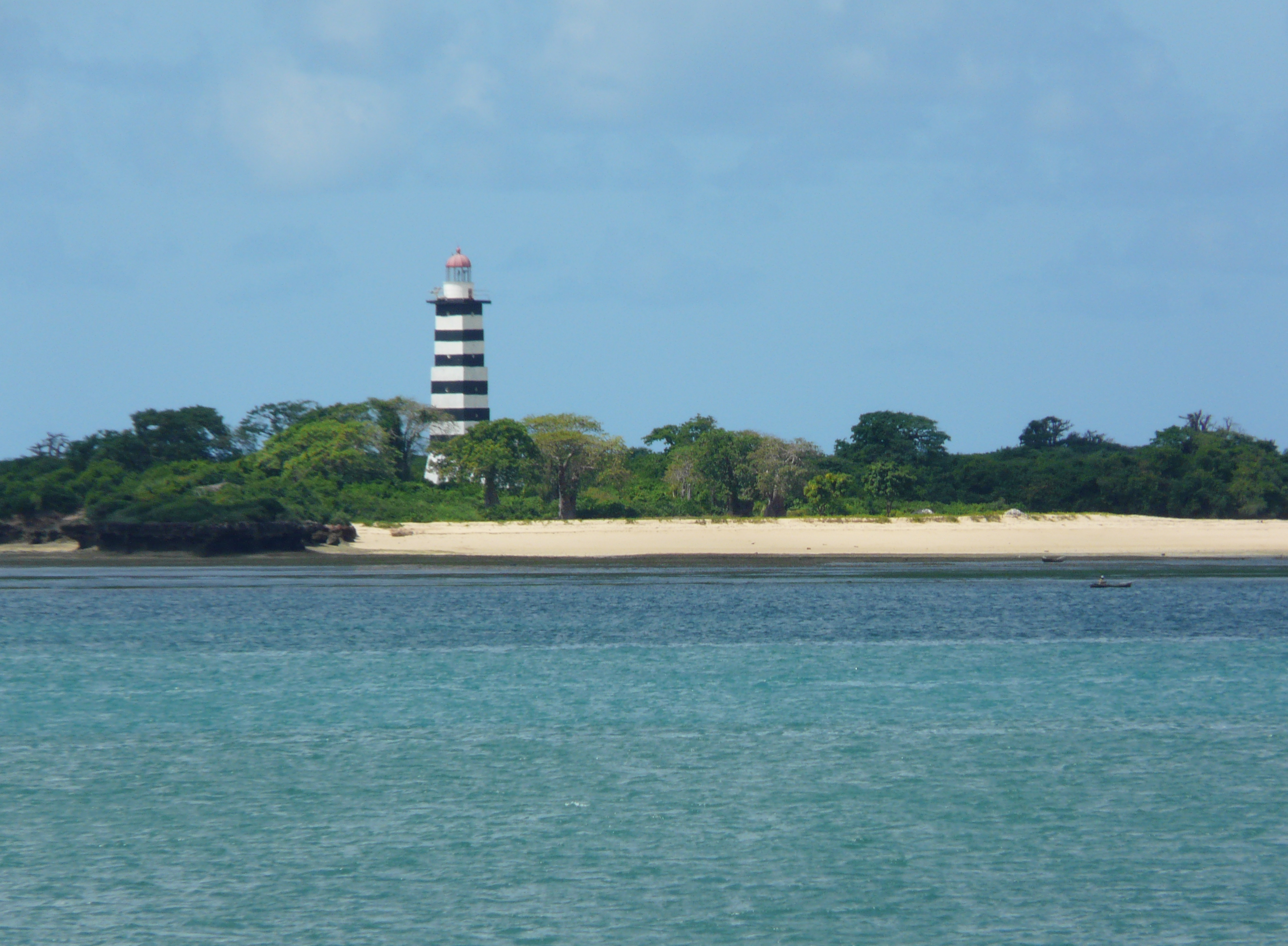
- Location: Dar es Salaam; Tanzania
- Coordinates: 6°47′27.1″S 39°20′13.9″E

Tower
- Constructed: 1894
- Construction: masonry tower
- Height: 29 metres (95 ft)
- Shape: quadrangular tower with balcony and lantern
- Markings: black and white horizontal bands
- Operator: Tanzania Ports Authority

Light
- Focal height: 29 metres (95 ft)
- Range: 15 nautical miles (28 km; 17 mi)
- Characteristic: Fl (3) W 20s.

The Makatumbe Range Rear Lighthouse (also known as Dar es Salaam Bay Range Rear or Outer Makatumbe lighthouse) is located on the island of Outer Makatumbe close to the coast of Dar es salaam, Tanzania. The lighthouse assists ships waiting in the strait that are about to enter the Kivukoni channel.

The lighthouse structure is similar to that of Ras Mkumbi Lighthouse and is a square masonry tower with a red lantern and gallery. The lighthouse structure was refurbished between 1997 and 1999 in a project that saw the overhaul of Port of Dar es Salaam infrastructure.

== See also ==
- List of lighthouses in Tanzania
