= List of caves in Tanzania =

This is a list of caves in Tanzania.

== Tanzania mainland ==
- Amboni Caves, Tanga
- Matumbi Caves, near Kilwa
- Grotte de Nduli, Kibata
- Mumba Cave
- Nandembo Cave System, Kibata (Nan'goma Cave, Nakitara, etc.)

== Gallery ==
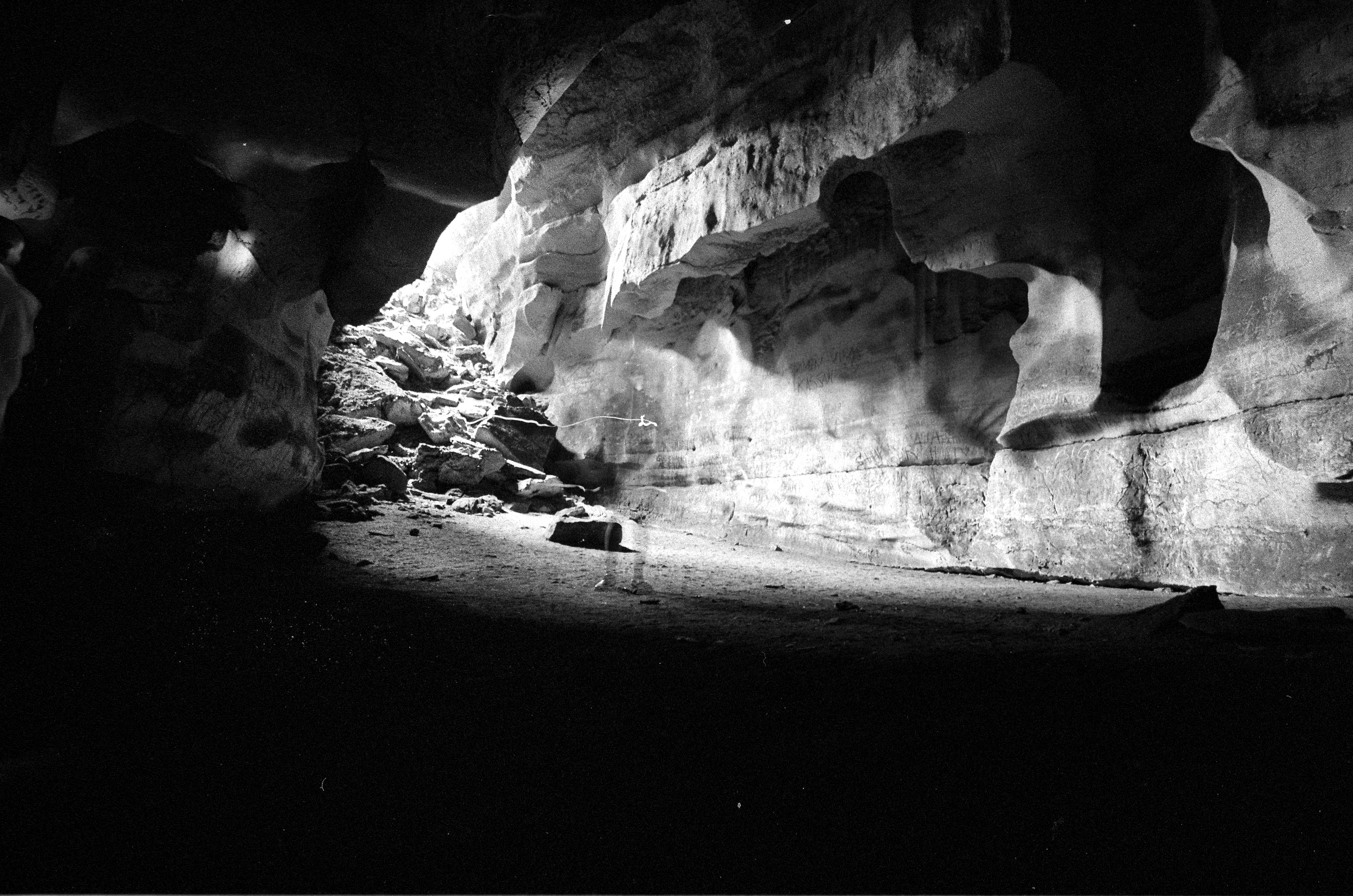
Amboni Caves

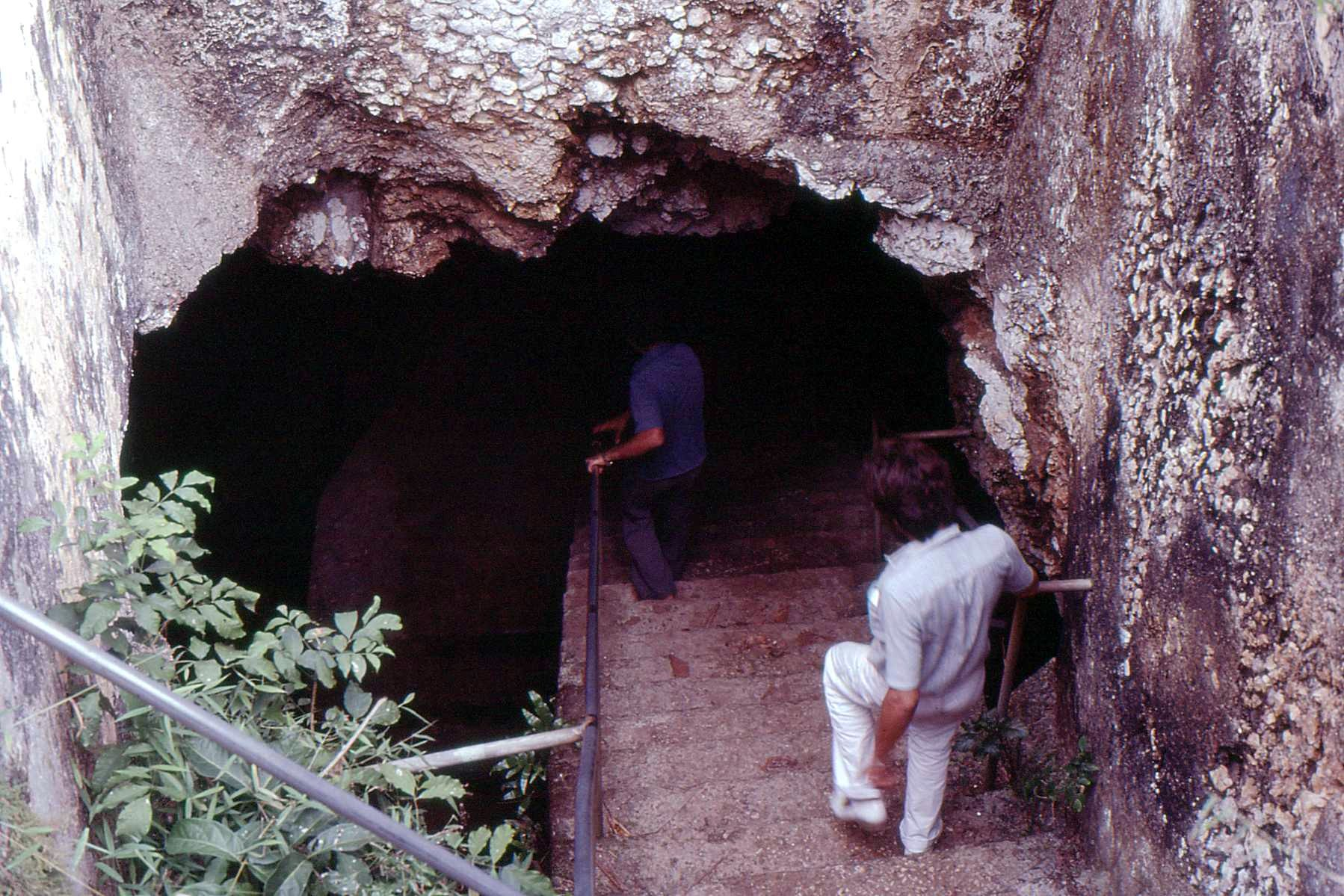
Mangapwani

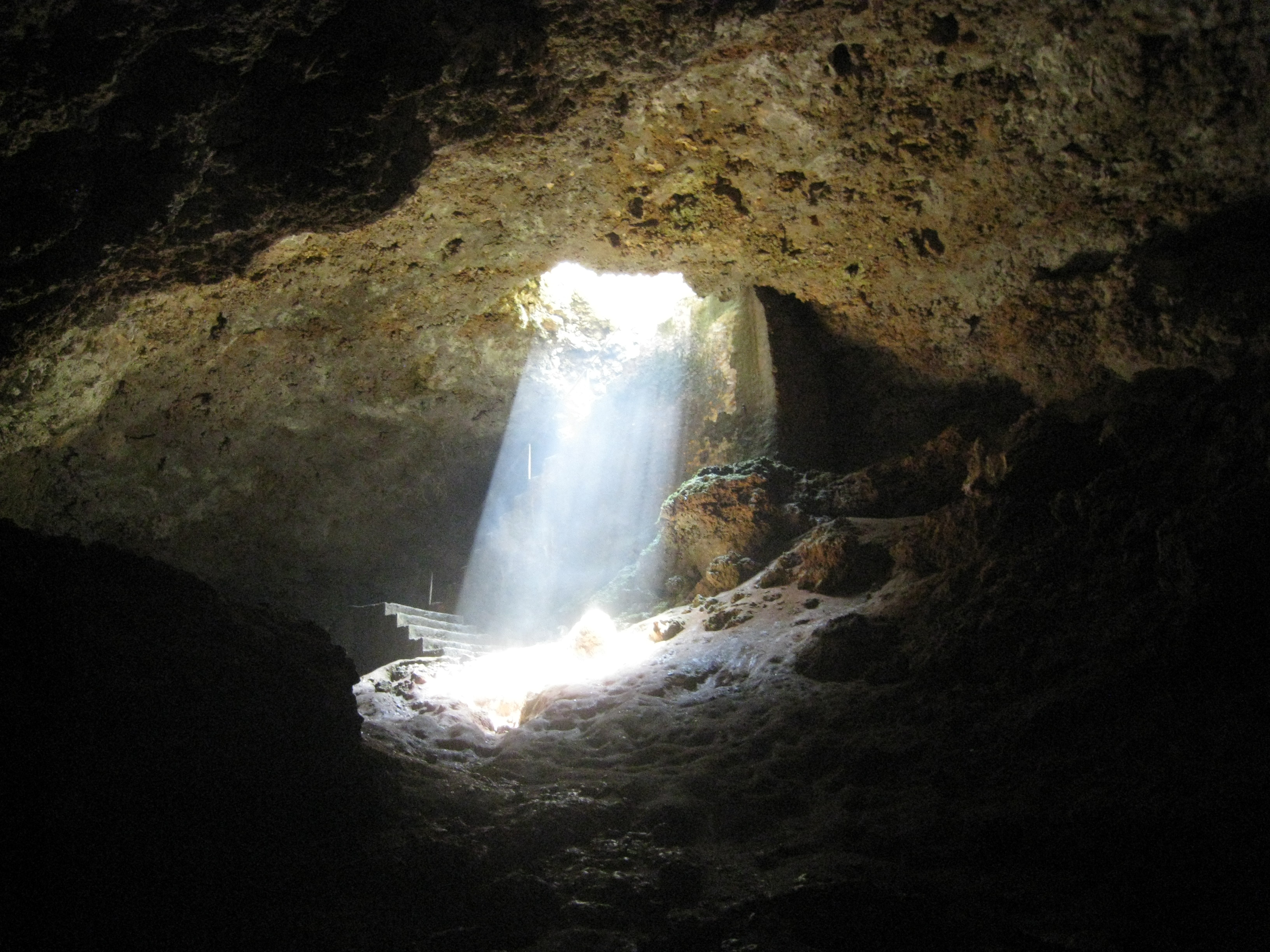
A cave in Zanzibar

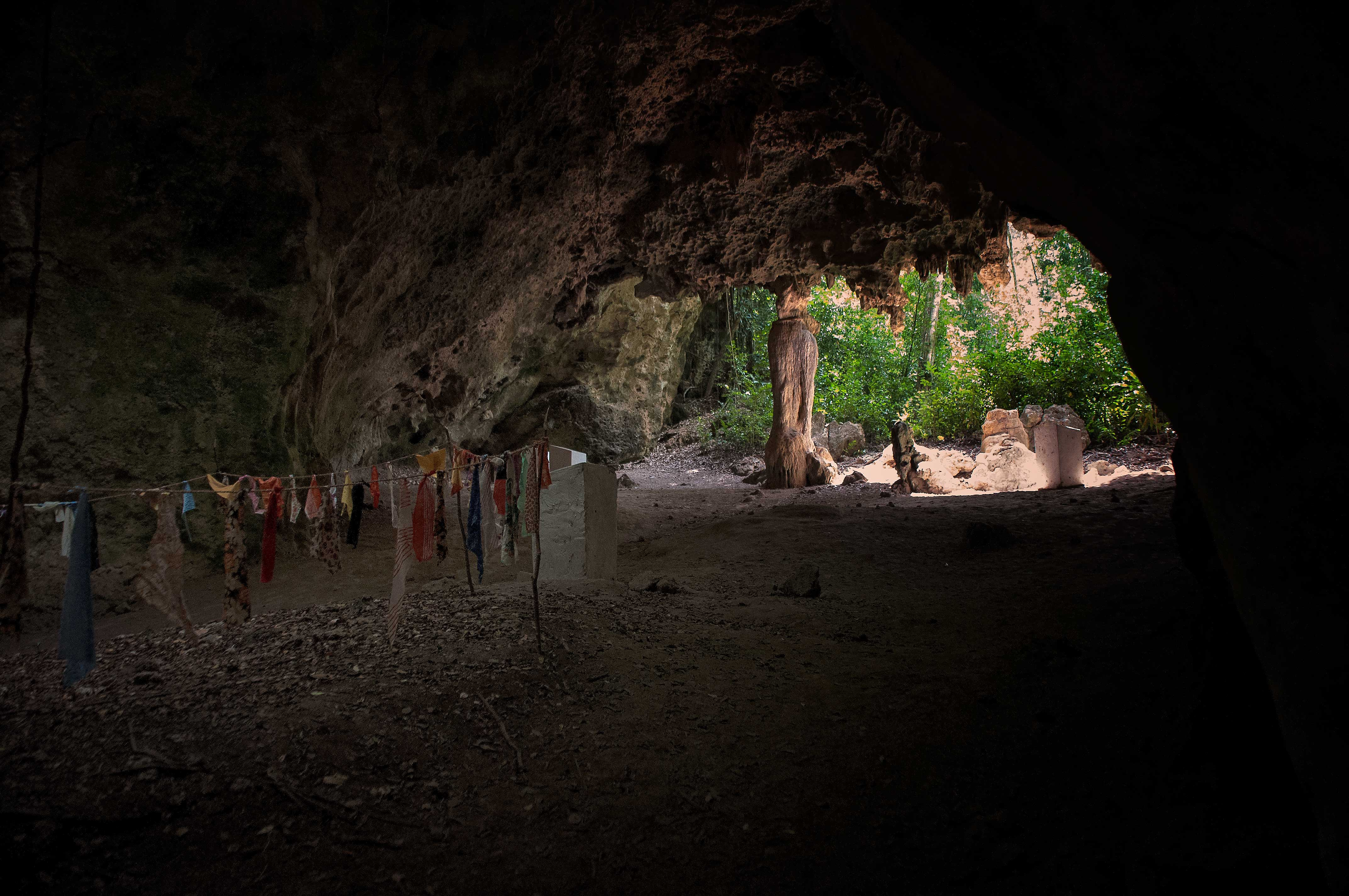
Kuumbi Cave

== See also ==
- List of caves
- Speleology
