= Mzizima, Tanga City Council =

Ward in Tanga City Council, Tanga Region

Mzizima Kata ya Mzizima (Swahili)
- Ward of Tanga City Council
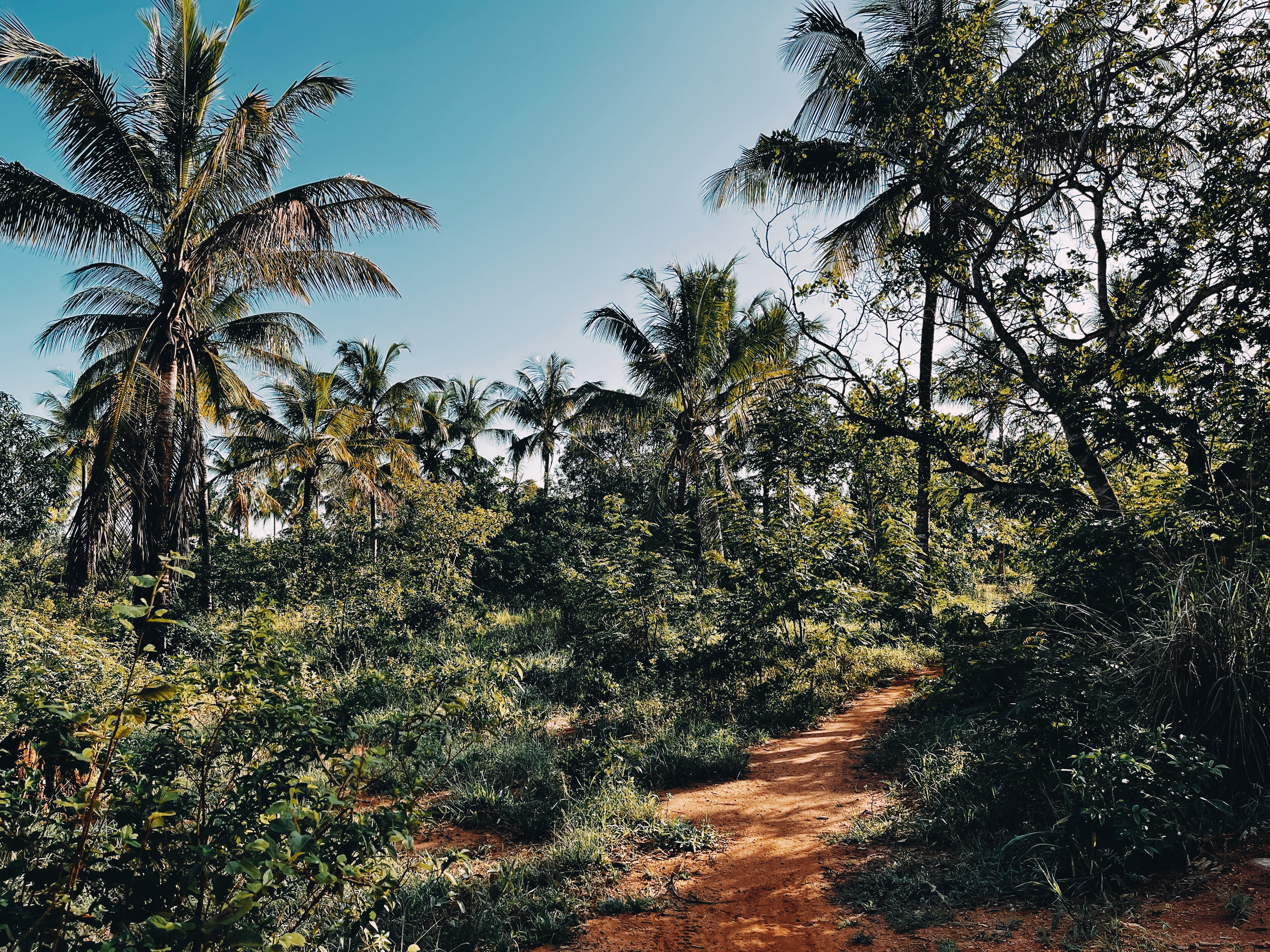
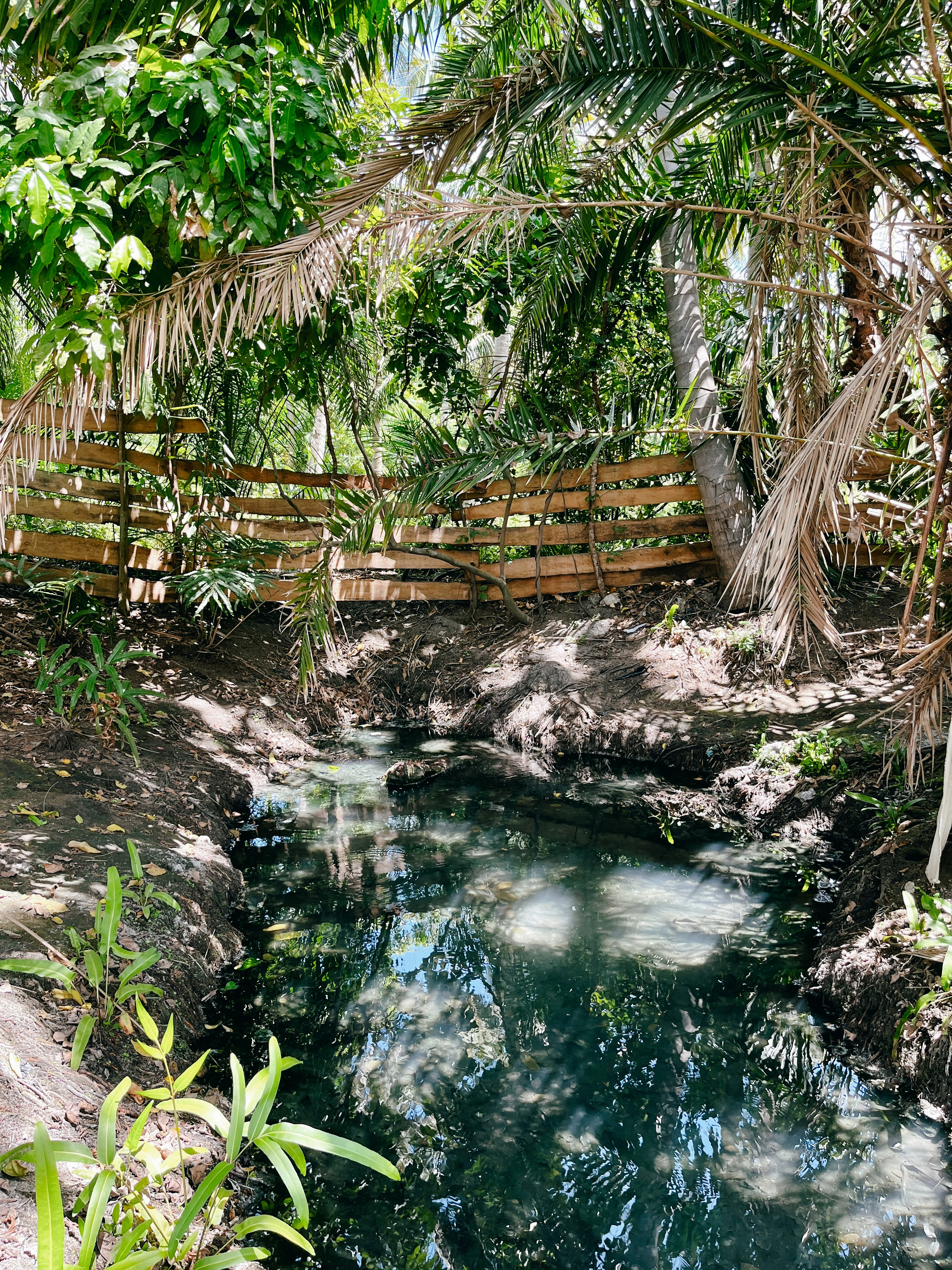
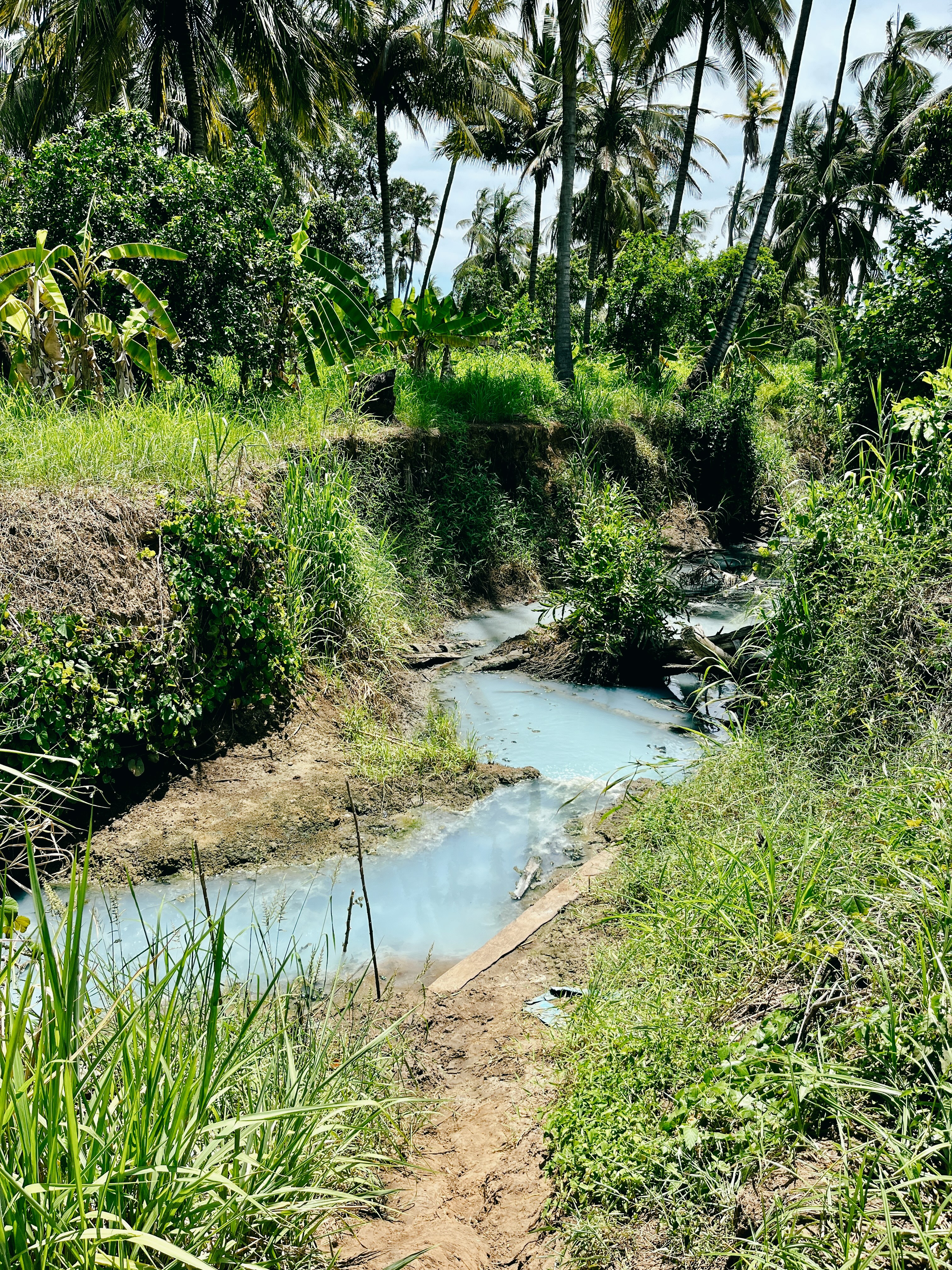
- From top to bottom: Landscape in Mzizima ward, Close up of Mzizima Hot Springs & Stream from Mzizima Hot Springs in Mzizima ward
- Interactive map of Mzizima
- Coordinates: 5°2′55.32″S 39°2′39.12″E
- Country: Tanzania
- Region: Tanga Region
- District: Tanga City Council

Area
  - Total: 56.2 km^{2} (21.7 sq mi)

Population (2012)
  - Total: 11,570

Ethnic groups
  - Settler: Swahili
  - Ancestral: Digo & Segeju
- Tanzanian Postal Code: 21202

Mzizima (Kata ya Mzizima , in Swahili) is an administrative ward in Tanga City Council of Tanga Region in Tanzania. Mabokweni ward borders the ward on its northern side. To the east are Chumbageni and Tanga Bay. The ward of Kiomoni is to the south. The Gombero ward of Mkinga is to the west. The ward covers an area of 56.2 km^{2} (21.7 sq mi), and has an average elevation of 97 m (318 ft). The Sigi River traverses through the ward into Tanga Bay. The ward is also home to the Mzizima Hot Springs also known as Galanos Hot Springs. According to the 2012 census, the ward has a total population of 11,570.

== Administration ==
The postal code for Mzizima Ward is 21202. The ward is divided into the following neighborhoods (Mitaa):

- Kongwa
- Mafuriko

- Mleni

=== Government ===
The ward has local government offices based on the population served.The Mzizima Ward administration building houses a court as per the Ward Tribunal Act of 1988, including other vital departments for the administration the ward. The ward has the following administration offices:

- Mzizima Police Station
- Mzizima Government Office (Afisa Mtendaji)
- Mzizima Tribunal (Baraza La Kata) is a Department inside Ward Government Office

In the local government system of Tanzania, the ward is the smallest democratic unit. Each ward is composed of a committee of eight elected council members which include a chairperson, one salaried officer (with no voting rights), and an executive officer. One-third of seats are reserved for women councillors.

== Demographics ==
Like much of the district, the ward is the ancestral home of the Digo people and Segeju.

== Education and health ==
=== Education ===
The ward is home to these educational institutions:

- Mleni Primary School
- Rubawa Primary School
- Amboni Primary School

=== Healthcare ===
The ward is home to the following health institutions:

- Mafuriko Health Center
