= Pongwe, Tanga City Council =

Ward in Tanga City Council, Tanga Region

Pongwe Kata ya Pongwe (Swahili)
- Ward of Tanga City Council
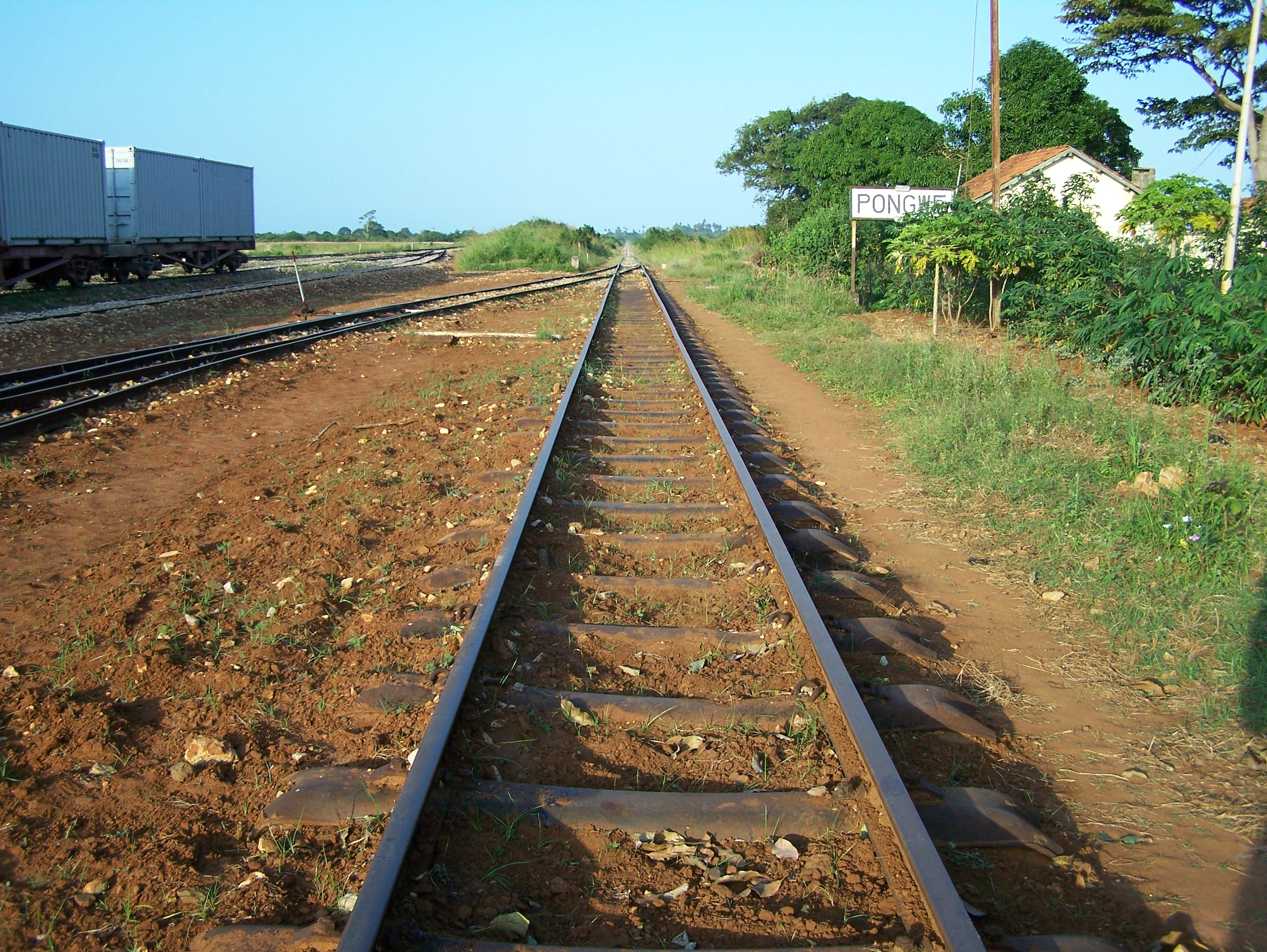
- From top to bottom: Railway tracts at Pongwe Railway Station
- Interactive map of Pongwe
- Coordinates: 5°7′29.28″S 38°58′31.8″E
- Country: Tanzania
- Region: Tanga Region
- District: Tanga City Council

Area
  - Total: 77.5 km^{2} (29.9 sq mi)

Population (2012)
  - Total: 13,513

Ethnic groups
  - Settler: Swahili
  - Ancestral: Digo & Segeju
- Tanzanian Postal Code: 21208

Pongwe (Kata ya Pongwe, in Swahili) is an administrative ward in Tanga City Council of Tanga Region in Tanzania. Kiomoni encircles the ward on its northern side. Maweni forms the eastern boundary of the ward. The Marungu is to the south. The Muheza ward of Ngomeni is to the west. The ward covers an area of 77.5 km^{2} (29.9 sq mi), and has an average elevation of 74 m (243 ft). According to the 2012 census, the ward has a total population of 13,513.

== Administration ==
The postal code for Pongwe Ward is 21112. The ward is divided into the following neighborhoods (Mitaa):

- Kisimatui
- Maranzara
- Mgwisha
- Pongwe Kaskazini

- Pongwe Kati
- Pongwe Kusini
- Sumbawanga

=== Government ===
The ward, like every other ward in the country, has local government offices based on the population served.The Pongwe Ward administration building houses a court as per the Ward Tribunal Act of 1988, including other vital departments for the administration the ward. The ward has the following administration offices:

- Pongwe Police Station
- Pongwe Government Office (Afisa Mtendaji)
- Pongwe Tribunal (Baraza La Kata) is a Department inside Ward Government Office

In the local government system of Tanzania, the ward is the smallest democratic unit. Each ward is composed of a committee of eight elected council members which include a chairperson, one salaried officer (with no voting rights), and an executive officer. One-third of seats are reserved for women councillors.

== Demographics ==
Like much of the district, the ward is the ancestral home of the Digo people and Segeju.

== Education and health ==
=== Education ===
The ward is home to these educational institutions:

- Pongwe Primary School
- Pongwe School of the Blind
- Ziwani Primary School
- Kigandini Primary School
- Maranzara Primary School
- Kisimatui Primary School
- Pongwe Secondary School
- Pongwe Islamic Girls Secondary School

=== Healthcare ===
The ward is home to the following health institutions:

- Pongwe Health Center
