= Maweni, Tanga City Council =

Ward in Tanga City Council, Tanga Region

Makorora Kata ya Makorora (Swahili)
- Ward of Tanga City Council
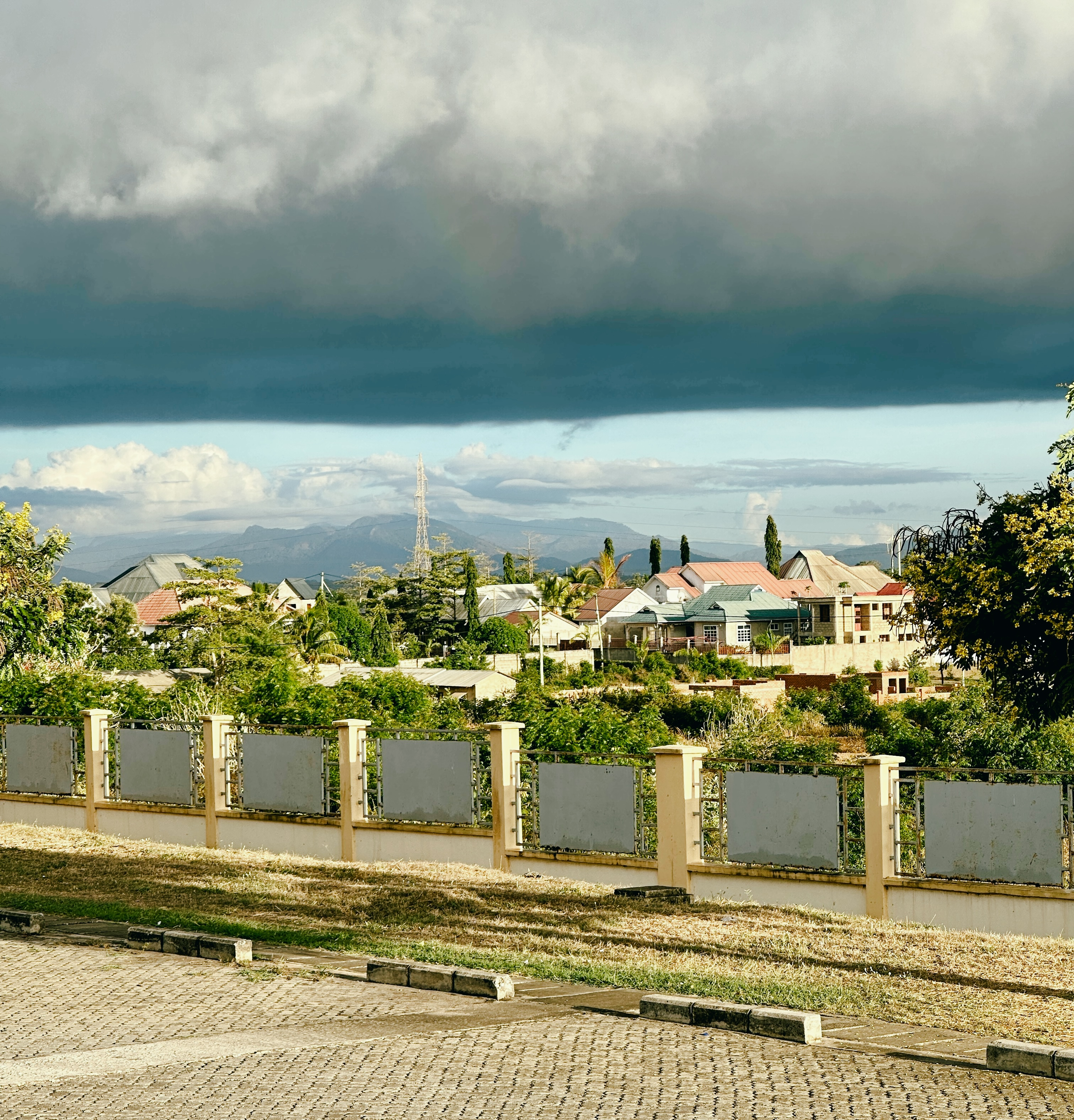
- From top to bottom: View of Maweni ward from Kange Bus Terminal
- Interactive map of Makorora
- Coordinates: 5°6′0″S 39°1′0.12″E
- Country: Tanzania
- Region: Tanga Region
- District: Tanga City Council

Area
  - Total: 72.7 km^{2} (28.1 sq mi)

Population (2012)
  - Total: 14,091

Ethnic groups
  - Settler: Swahili
  - Ancestral: Digo & Segeju
- Tanzanian Postal Code: 21206

Maweni (Kata ya Maweni, in Swahili) is an administrative ward in Tanga City Council of Tanga Region in Tanzania. Kiomoni forms the ward's northern border. Mwanzange and Tangasisi are the two wards that are bounded to the east. Tongoni ward is in the south. Pongwe is to the west. The ward covers an area of 72.7 km^{2} (28.1 sq mi), and has an average elevation of 75 m (246 ft). According to the 2012 census, the ward has a total population of 14,091.

== Administration ==
The postal code for Maweni Ward is 21206. The ward is divided into the following neighborhoods (Mitaa):

- Kange
- Kasera

- Kichangani
- Saruji

=== Government ===
The ward, like every other ward in the country, has local government offices based on the population served.The Maweni Ward administration building houses a court as per the Ward Tribunal Act of 1988, including other vital departments for the administration the ward. The ward has the following administration offices:

- Maweni Police Station
- Maweni Government Office (Afisa Mtendaji)
- Maweni Tribunal (Baraza La Kata) is a Department inside Ward Government Office

In the local government system of Tanzania, the ward is the smallest democratic unit. Each ward is composed of a committee of eight elected council members which include a chairperson, one salaried officer (with no voting rights), and an executive officer. One-third of seats are reserved for women councillors.

== Demographics ==
Like much of the district, the ward is the ancestral home of the Digo people and Segeju.

== Education and health ==
=== Education ===
The ward is home to these educational institutions:

- Maweni Primary School
- Kange Primary School
- Saruji Primary School
- Maweni Secondary School
- Rosmini Secondary School

=== Healthcare ===
The ward is home to the following health institutions:

- Kange Health Center
- Rosmini Health Center
- Saruji Health Center
