= Ras Nungwi Lighthouse =

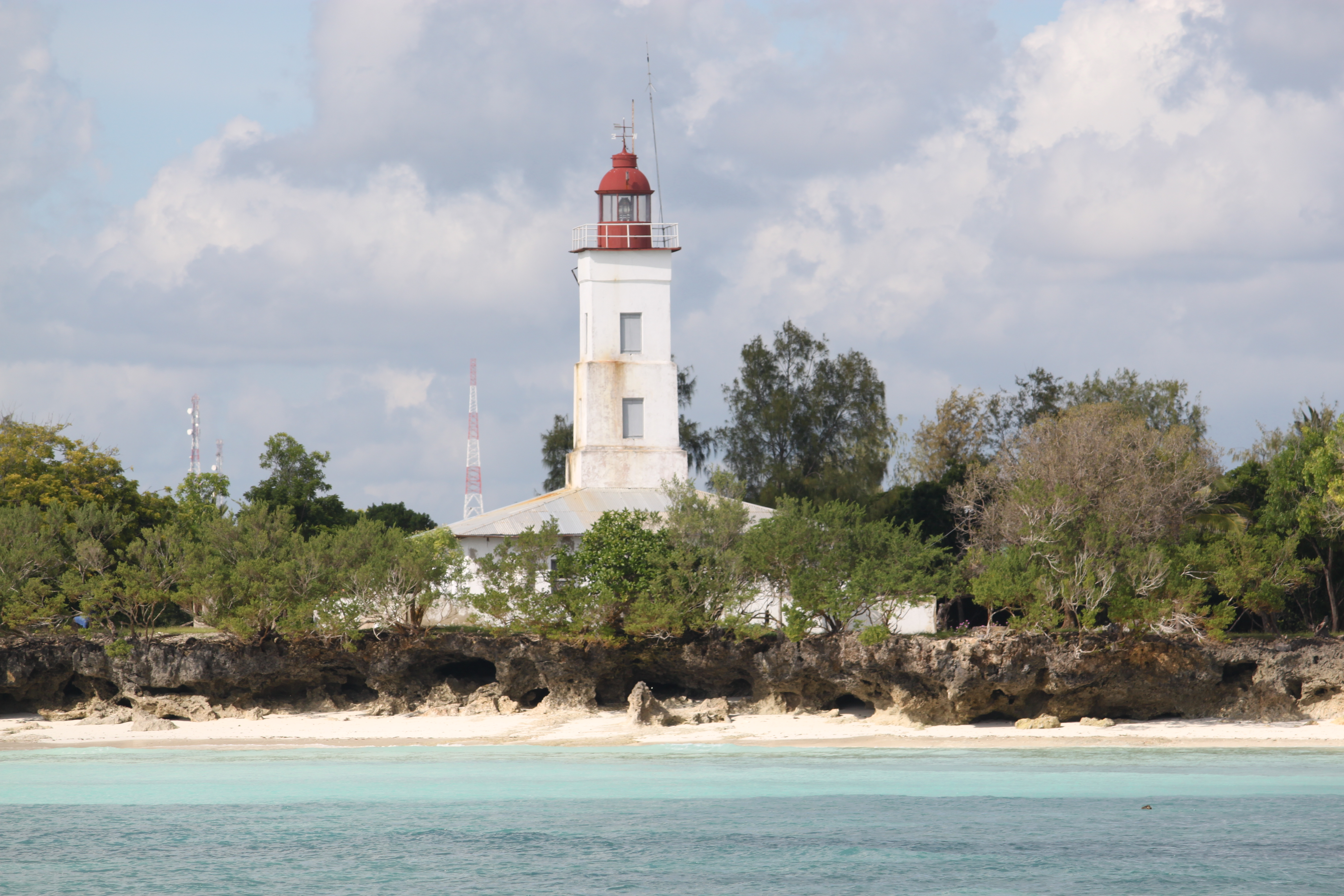
- Location: Unguja; Zanzibar Archipelago; Tanzania
- Coordinates: 5°43′20.3″S 39°18′12.0″E

Tower
- Constructed: 1881 (first)
- Construction: stone tower
- Height: 14 metres (46 ft)
- Shape: 3-stage square tower with balcony and lantern
- Markings: white tower, red lantern
- Operator: Zanzibar Ports Corporation

Light
- First lit: 1926 (current)
- Focal height: 18 metres (59 ft)
- Range: 13 nautical miles (24 km; 15 mi)
- Characteristic: Fl W 5s.

The Ras Nungwi (also known as Hog Point) is located at the northern tip of Unguja island in Nungwi, Zanzibar, Tanzania. The lighthouse is the oldest on the island and is a three-stage square stone tower, painted white.

== See also ==
- List of lighthouses in Tanzania
