= Mkulumuzi River =

River in Tanzania

Mkulumuzi River is a river of Tanga Region, Tanzania. The river flows into Tanga Bay in the Pemba Channel.It is part of the Pangani River basin.
