= Kiomoni =

Ward in Tanga City Council, Tanga Region

Duga Kata ya Duga (Swahili)
- Ward of Tanga City Council
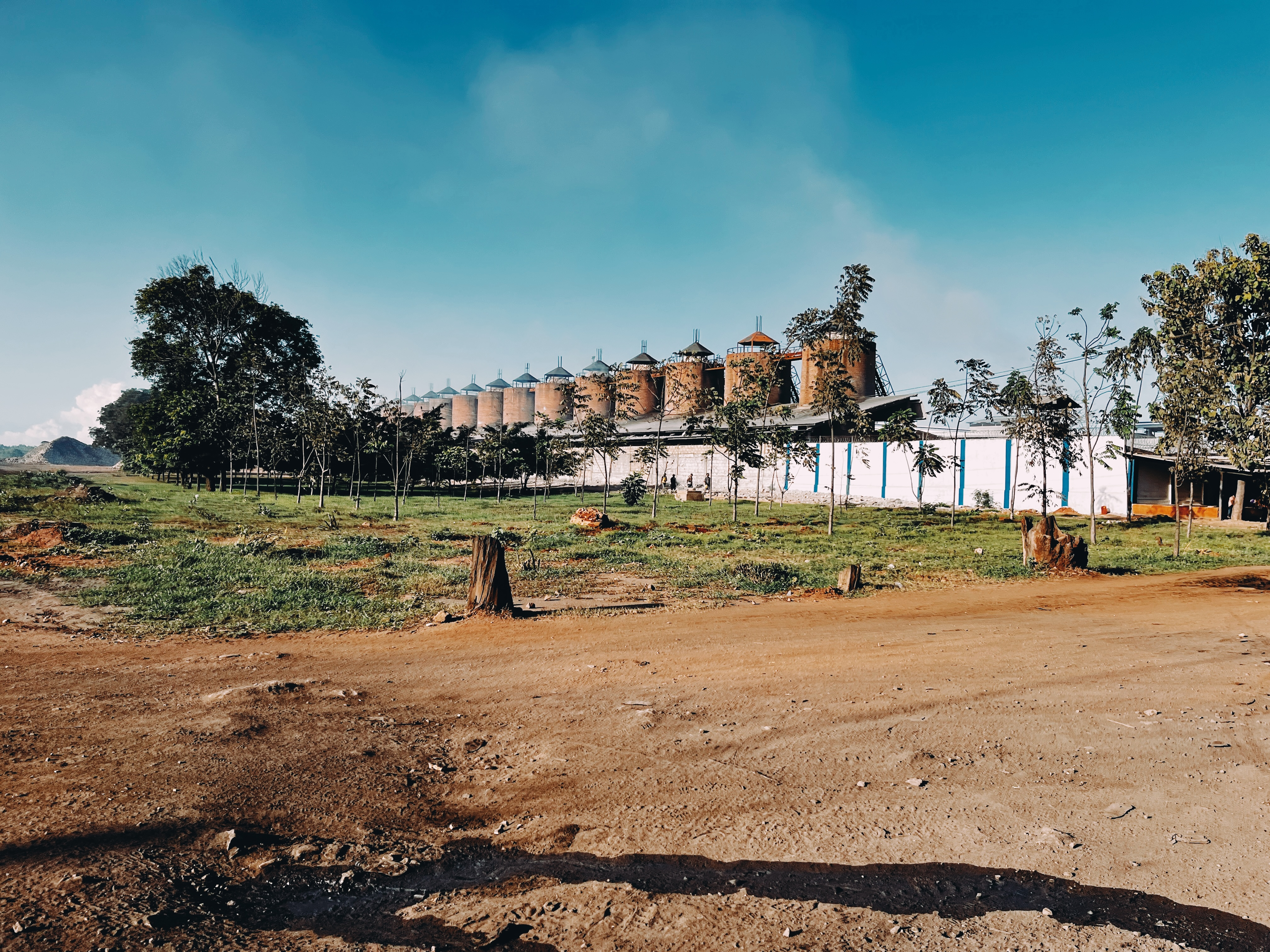
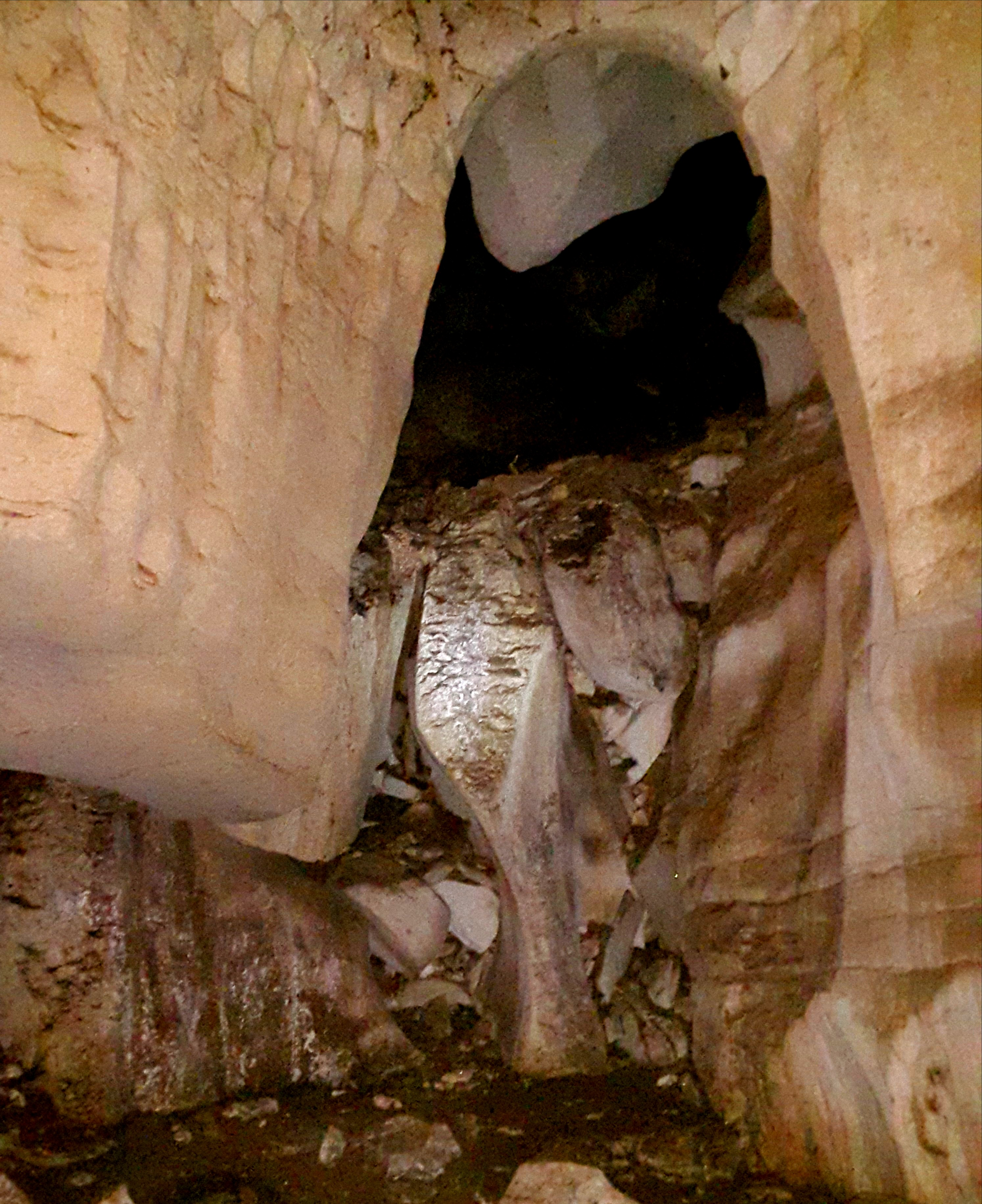
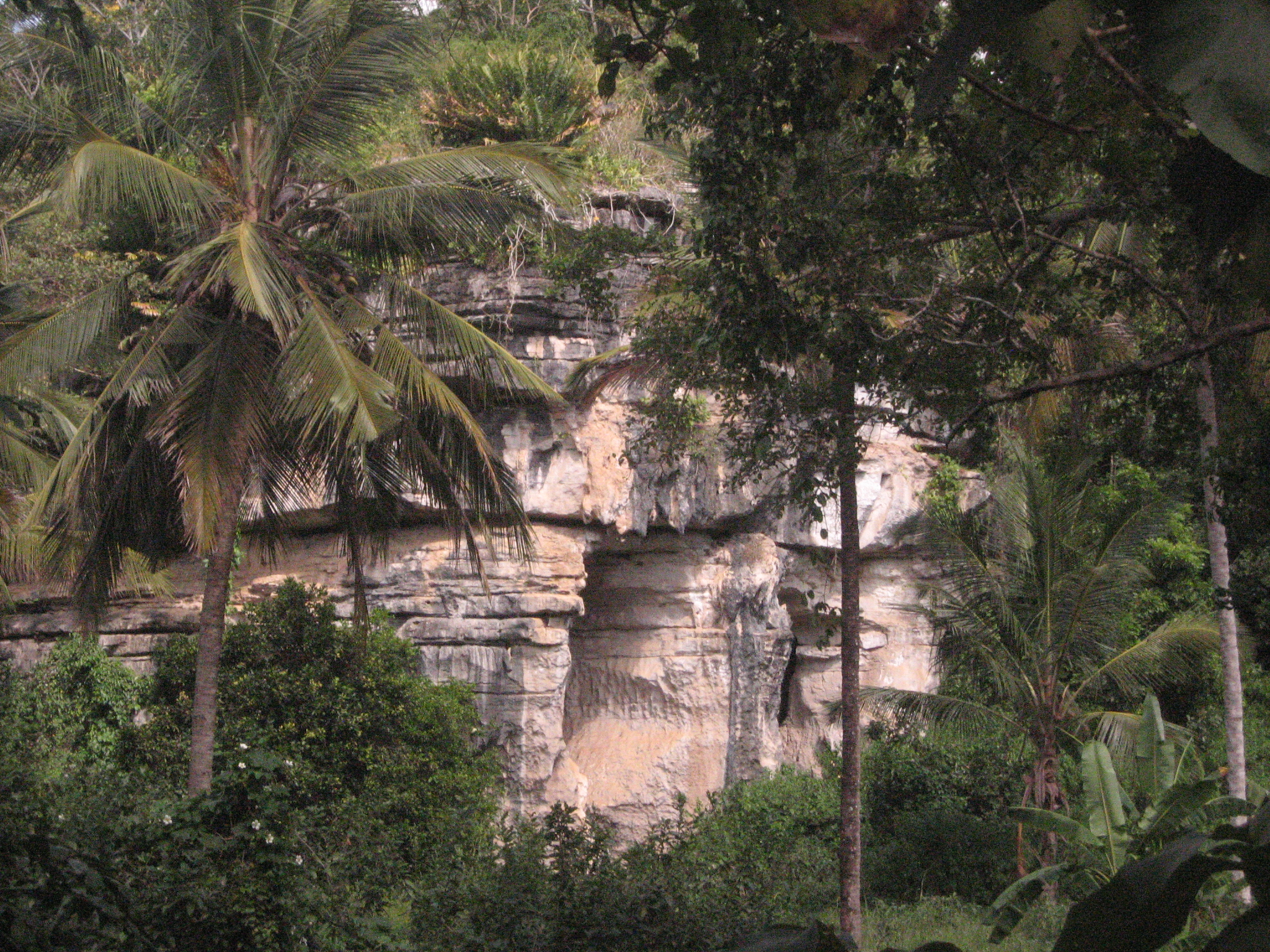
- From top to bottom: Limestone factory in Kiomoni ward & Amboni Caves in Kiomini
- Interactive map of Duga
- Coordinates: 5°3′17.28″S 38°56′58.56″E
- Country: Tanzania
- Region: Tanga Region
- District: Tanga City Council

Area
  - Total: 83.5 km^{2} (32.2 sq mi)

Population (2012)
  - Total: 6,587

Ethnic groups
  - Settler: Swahili
  - Ancestral: Digo & Segeju
- Tanzanian Postal Code: 21203

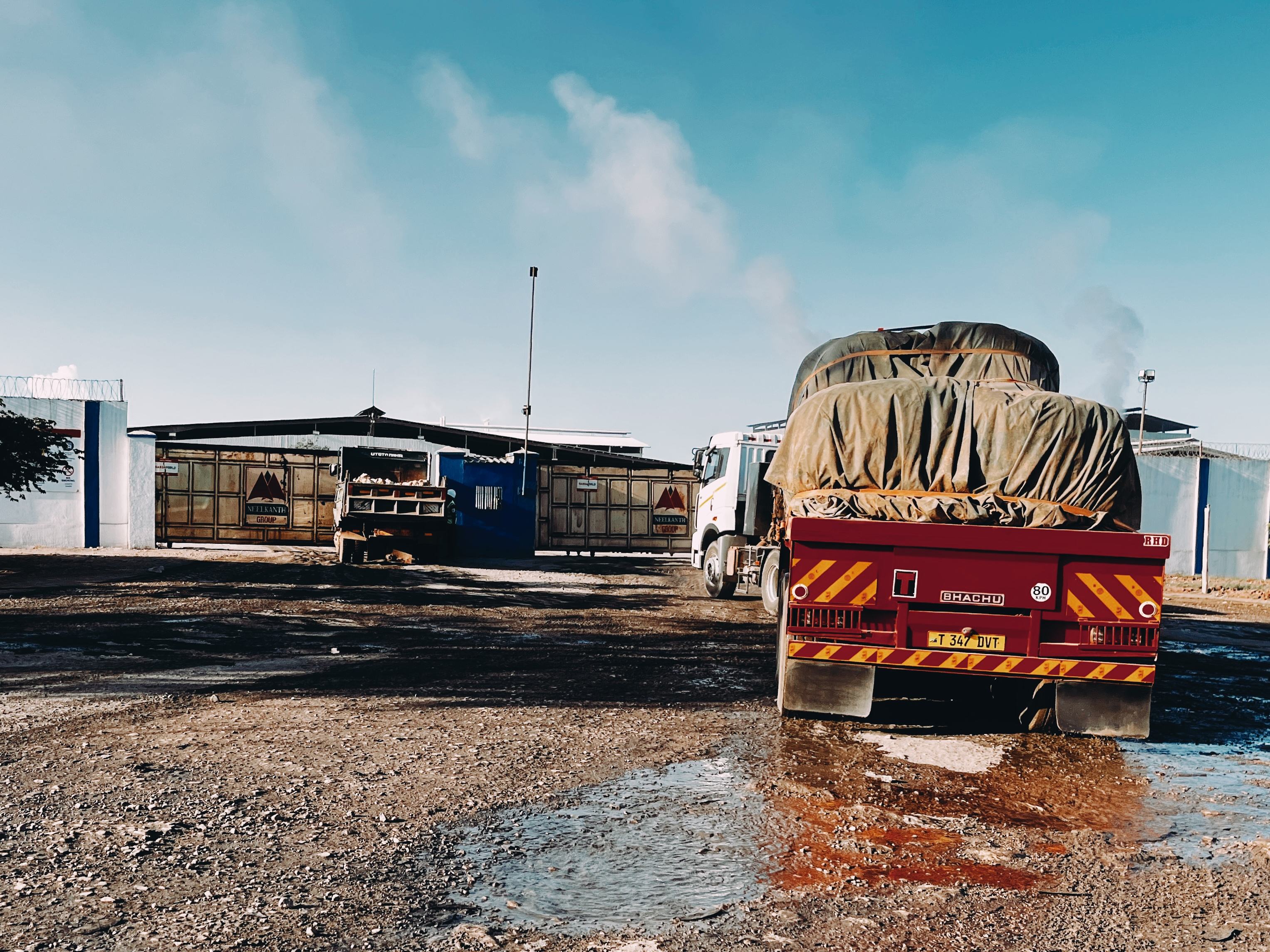
Trucks at Limestone factory, Kiomoni Ward

Kiomoni (Kata ya Kiomoni , in Swahili) is an administrative ward in Tanga City Council of Tanga Region in Tanzania. The Mzizima, Gombero, and Mnyenzani wards the latter two of Mkinga, surround the ward on its northern side. Chumbageni and Nguvumali wards are to the east. Maweni and Pongwe wards are located to the south. The Muheza District wards of Mlingoni and Pande Darajani are to the west. The ward covers an area of 83.5 km^{2} (32.2 sq mi), and has an average elevation of 52 m (171 ft). The ward is home to the Amboni Caves and also the largest limestone mine in the country. According to the 2012 census, the ward has a total population of 6,587.

== Administration ==
The postal code for Kiomoni Ward is 21114. The ward is divided into the following neighborhoods (Mitaa):

- Kiomoni
- Kivuleni
- Mabayani

- Ndumi
- Pande "A"

=== Government ===
The ward, like every other ward in the country, has local government offices based on the population served.The Kiomoni Ward administration building houses a court as per the Ward Tribunal Act of 1988, including other vital departments for the administration the ward. The ward has the following administration offices:

- Kiomoni Police Station
- Kiomoni Government Office (Afisa Mtendaji)
- Kiomoni Tribunal (Baraza La Kata) is a Department inside Ward Government Office

In the local government system of Tanzania, the ward is the smallest democratic unit. Each ward is composed of a committee of eight elected council members which include a chairperson, one salaried officer (with no voting rights), and an executive officer. One-third of seats are reserved for women councillors.

== Demographics ==
Like much of the district, the ward is the ancestral home of the Digo people and Segeju.

== Education and health ==
=== Education ===
The ward is home to these educational institutions:

- Kiomoni Primary School
- Kivuleni Primary School
- Jambe Primary School
- Kiomoni Secondary School

=== Healthcare ===
The ward is home to the following health institutions:

- Pande Health Center
