= Mabokweni =

Ward in Tanga City Council, Tanga Region

Mabokweni Kata ya Mabokweni (Swahili)
- Ward of Tanga City Council
- From top to bottom
- Interactive map of Mabokweni
- Coordinates: 5°1′28.56″S 39°3′34.92″E
- Country: Tanzania
- Region: Tanga Region
- District: Tanga City Council

Area
  - Total: 47.6 km^{2} (18.4 sq mi)

Population (2012)
  - Total: 5,433

Ethnic groups
  - Settler: Swahili
  - Ancestral: Digo & Segeju
- Tanzanian Postal Code: 21204

Mabokweni (Kata ya Mabokweni , in Swahili) is an administrative ward in Tanga City Council of Tanga Region in Tanzania. The Mtimbwani and Gombero wards of Mkinga District border the ward on the north and west, respectively. Chongoleani is to the east. The ward of Mzizima is to the south. The ward covers an area of 47.6 km^{2} (18.4 sq mi), and has an average elevation of 48 m (157 ft). According to the 2012 census, the ward has a total population of 5,433.

== Administration ==
The postal code for Mabokweni Ward is 21204. The ward is divided into the following neighborhoods (Mitaa):

- Kibafuta
- Kiruku

- Mabokweni

=== Government ===
The ward, like every other ward in the country, has local government offices based on the population served.The Mabokweni Ward administration building houses a court as per the Ward Tribunal Act of 1988, including other vital departments for the administration the ward. The ward has the following administration offices:

- Mabokweni Police Station
- Mabokweni Government Office (Afisa Mtendaji)
- Mabokweni Tribunal (Baraza La Kata) is a Department inside Ward Government Office

In the local government system of Tanzania, the ward is the smallest democratic unit. Each ward is composed of a committee of eight elected council members which include a chairperson, one salaried officer (with no voting rights), and an executive officer. One-third of seats are reserved for women councillors.

== Demographics ==
Like much of the district, the ward is the ancestral home of the Digo people and Segeju.

== Education and health ==
=== Education ===
The ward is home to these educational institutions:

- Mabokweni Primary School
- Kiruku Primary
- Kibafuta Primary School
- Mabokweni Secondary School

=== Healthcare ===
The ward is home to the following health institutions:

- Mabokweni Health Center
- Kibafuta Health Center
