= Ras Mkumbi Lighthouse =

Historic Lighthouse in Pwani Region, Tanzania

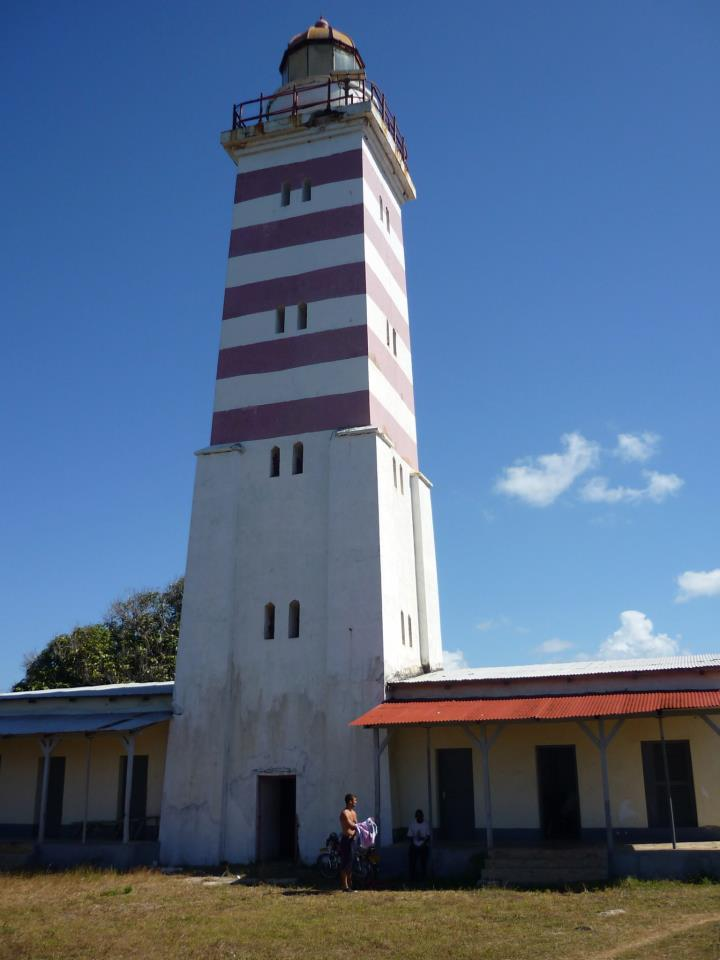
- Ras Mkumbi Lighthouse
- Location: Tanzania, Pwani Region, Mafia District, Kanga
- Coordinates: 7°38′24.4″S 39°54′19.2″E

Tower
- Constructed: 1894
- Construction: masonry tower
- Height: 30 metres (98 ft)
- Shape: 2-stage square tower with balcony and lantern attached to 1-storey keeper's house
- Markings: white lower half tower, white and red band upper half tower, red lantern dome and rail
- Operator: Tanzania Ports Authority

Light
- Focal height: 31 metres (102 ft)
- Range: 16 nautical miles (30 km; 18 mi)
- Characteristic: Fl W 5s.

The Ras Mkumbi Lighthouse (Mnara wa Taa wa Ras Mkumbi, in Swahili) is a historic lighthouse located on the northern tip (Moresby Point) of Mafia Island on Kanga ward of Mafia District in the Pwani Region of Tanzania.

== Gallery ==
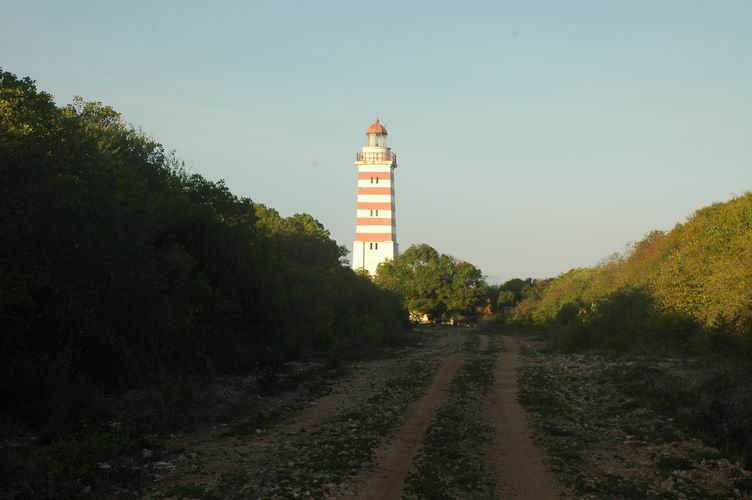

== See also ==
- List of lighthouses in Tanzania
