= Chongoleani =

Ward in Tanga City Council, Tanga Region

Chongoleani Kata ya Chongoleani (Swahili)
- Ward of Tanga City Council
- From top to bottom
- Interactive map of Chongoleani
- Coordinates: 4°59′6.72″S 39°5′8.88″E
- Country: Tanzania
- Region: Tanga Region
- District: Tanga City Council

Area
  - Total: 37 km^{2} (14 sq mi)

Population (2012)
  - Total: 4,737

Ethnic groups
  - Settler: Swahili
  - Ancestral: Digo & Segeju
- Tanzanian Postal Code: 21105

Chongoleani(Kata ya Chongoleani , in Swahili) is an administrative ward in Tanga City Council of Tanga Region in Tanzania. The Mtimbwani and Kwale wards of Mkinga border the ward to the north. Tanga Bay of Pemba Channel is to the east. The Tanga Bay is to the south. Mabokweni ward is to the west. The ward covers an area of 37 km^{2} (14 sq mi). and has an average elevation of 10 m (33 ft). According to the 2012 census, the ward has a total population of 4,737.

== Administration ==
The postal code for Chongoleani Ward is 21101. The ward is divided into the following neighborhoods (Mitaa):

- Chongoleani
- Mpirani

- Ndaoya
- Putini

=== Government ===
The ward, like every other ward in the country, has local government offices based on the population served.The Chongoleani Ward administration building houses a court as per the Ward Tribunal Act of 1988, including other vital departments for the administration the ward. The ward has the following administration offices:

- Chongoleani Police Station
- Chongoleani Government Office (Afisa Mtendaji)
- Chongoleani Tribunal (Baraza La Kata) is a Department inside Ward Government Office

In the local government system of Tanzania, the ward is the smallest democratic unit. Each ward is composed of a committee of eight elected council members which include a chairperson, one salaried officer (with no voting rights), and an executive officer. One-third of seats are reserved for women councillors.

== Demographics ==
Like much of the district, the ward is the ancestral home of the Digo people and Segeju.

== Education and health ==
=== Education ===
The ward is home to these educational institutions:

- Chongoleani Primary School
- Mambabani Primary School
- Putini Primary School
- Chongoleani Secondary School
- Ndaoya Primary School
- Ndaoya Secondary School

=== Healthcare ===
The ward is home to the following health institutions:

- Chongoleani Health Center
