= Amboni Caves =

Cave system in Tanga Region, Tanzania

- Mapango ya Amboni (Swahili)
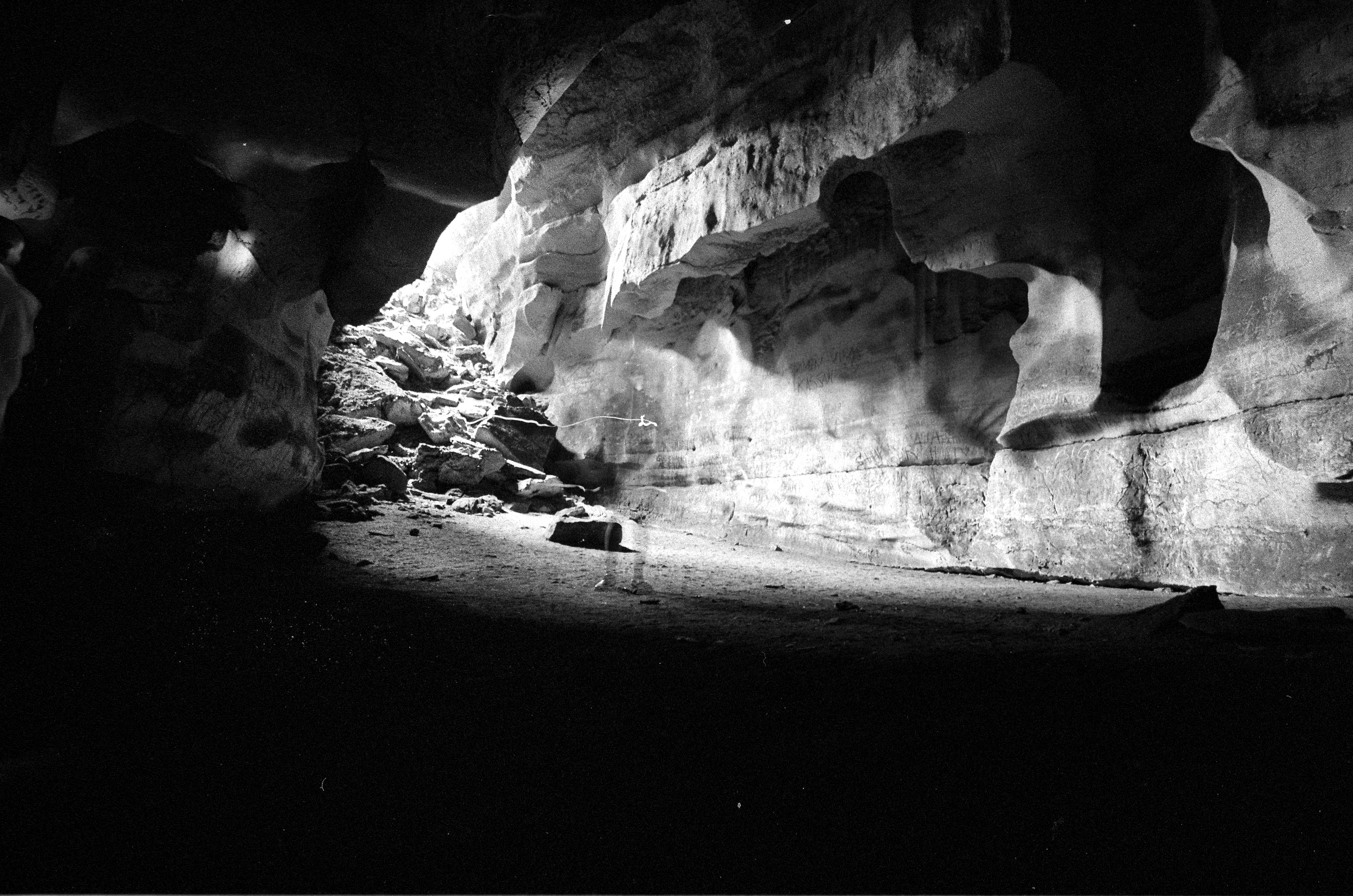
- Amboni Caves interior

- Location within Tanzania
- Location: Kiomoni, Tanga, Tanga Region, Tanzania
- Coordinates: 05°00′S 39°03′E
- Length: 755 metres (2,477 ft)
- Geology: Limestone
- Visitors: c. 70 per day

The Amboni Caves (Mapango ya Amboni, in Swahili) are a limestone cave complex in East Africa. They are located in Kiomoni ward of Tanga in Tanga Region of Tanzania off the Tanga-Mombasa road, 8 km north of Tanga City center. The reported length of the longest cave is 755m. The caves were formed about 150 million years ago during the Jurassic age. It covers an area of 234 km^{2}. According to researchers the area was under water some 20 million years ago. There are altogether ten caves but only one is used for guided tours.

== History ==
Amboni Limited, a company which was then operating sisal plantations in Tanga Region acquired the area in 1892. The company notified the British colonial government about the caves who in turn declared the caves a conservation area in 1922.

It is not known when the caves were exactly discovered but reports indicate that ethnic groups such as the Segeju, Sambaa, Bondei and Digo who lived near the caves used it for prayers.

In 1963, the then government of Tanganyika handed over the caves to the Department of Antiquities.

== Attractions ==
The cave attracts tourist as well as students for their geography lessons. The attractions include:

- Popo flight - (Popo means bat in Swahili). Many of them live in the caves. Every evening at sunset they fly out of the cave entrance.
- Rocks in the shape of: a sofa, a ship, a crocodile, an elephant, map of Africa, Statue of Liberty and a head of a male lion.

== Gallery ==
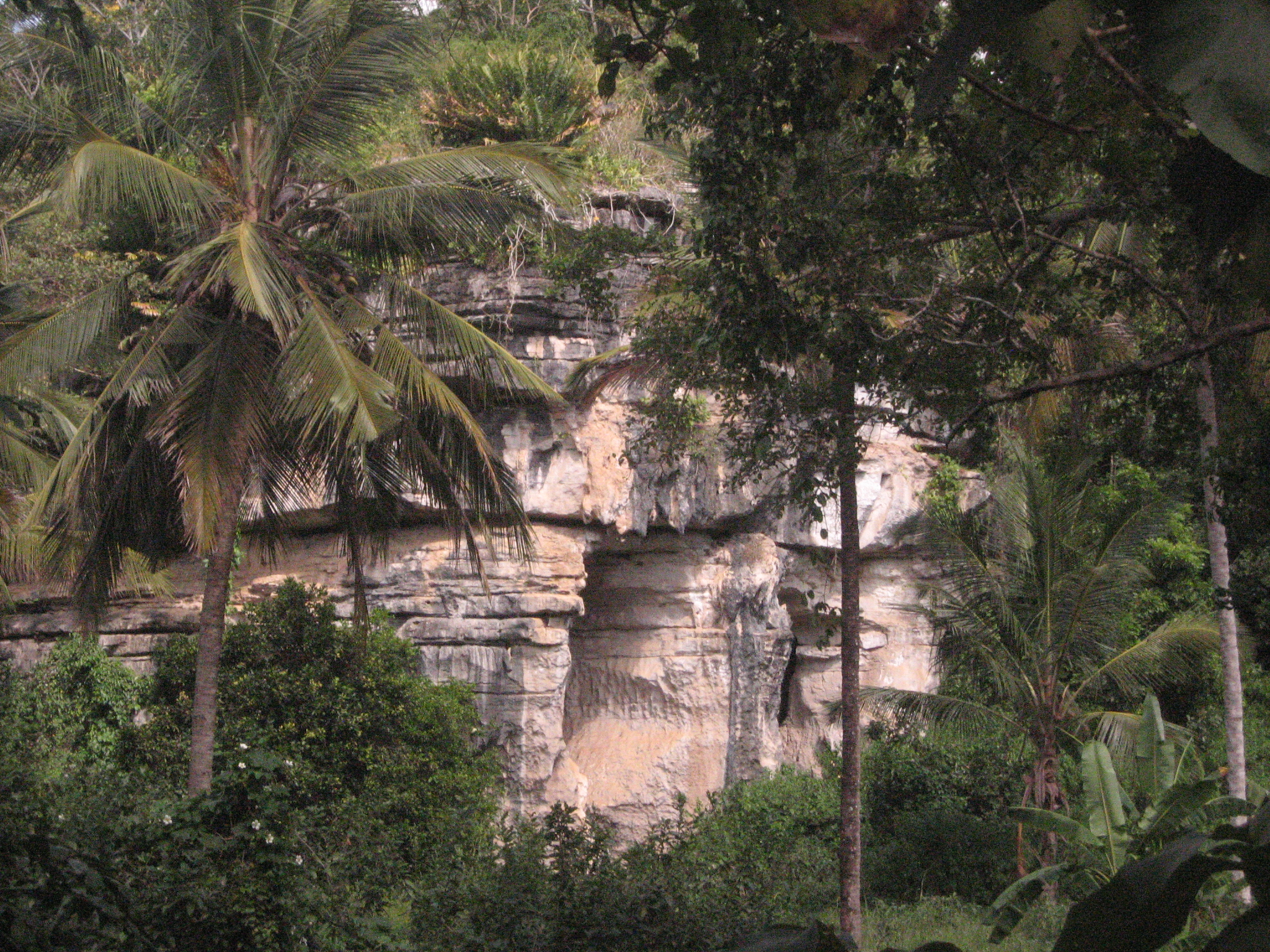
Exterior

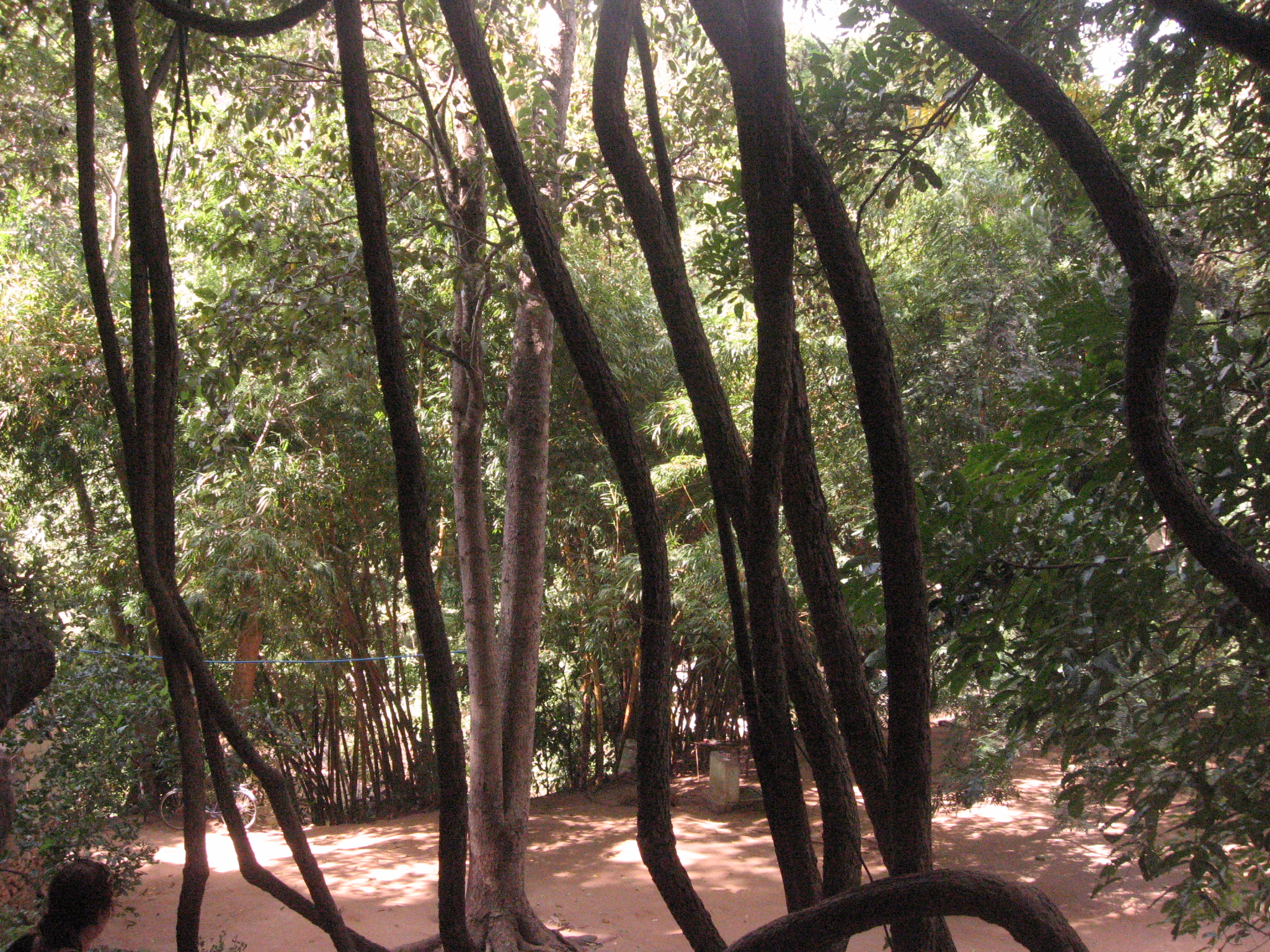
Vines
