= Zigi River =

Coordinates: 5°2′6″S 39°6′1″E

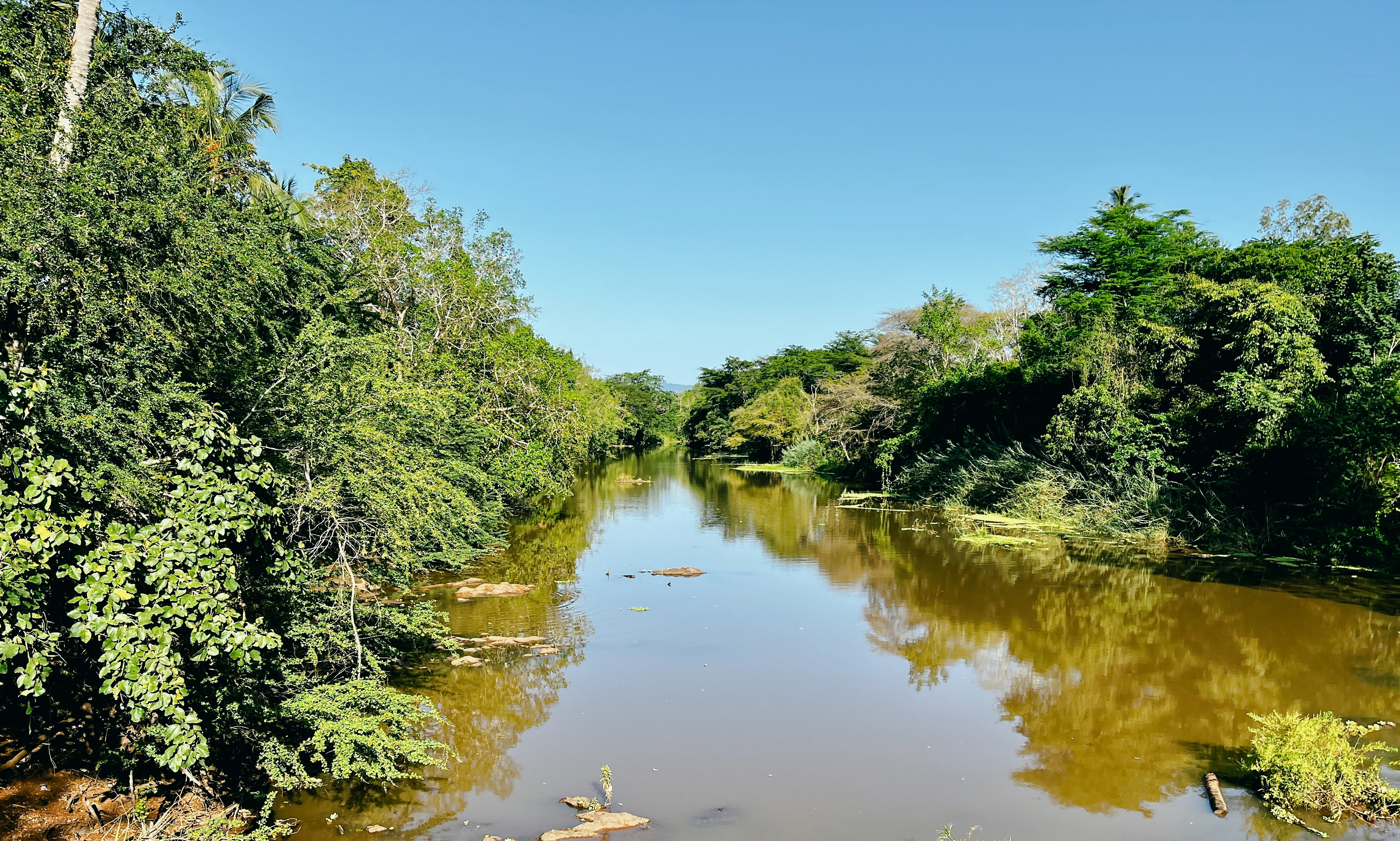
- Sigi River in Mnyanzini Ward, Mkinga

Location
- Country: Tanzania

Physical characteristics
- Source
  - location: Usambara Mountains, Muheza District, Tanzania
  - elevation: 2,290 m
- Mouth
  - location: Mzizma Ward, Tanga District
- Length: 100 km (62 mi)

Basin features
- Tributaries
  - left: Musi
  - right: Kihuhui

Zigi River also known as Sigi River (Swahili: Mto Sigi), is a river in located in east Tanga Region in Tanzania.

The river rises in the Amani Nature Reserve in the east Usambara Mountains in Muheza District, more precisely in Handei Mountains, at an altitude of 1130 meters and flows for 100 km in a long course and multiple changes of direction to its mouth 40 km north of the town of Tanga in the Indian Ocean. Its tributaries are the Kihuhui (from south) and the Musi (from North).

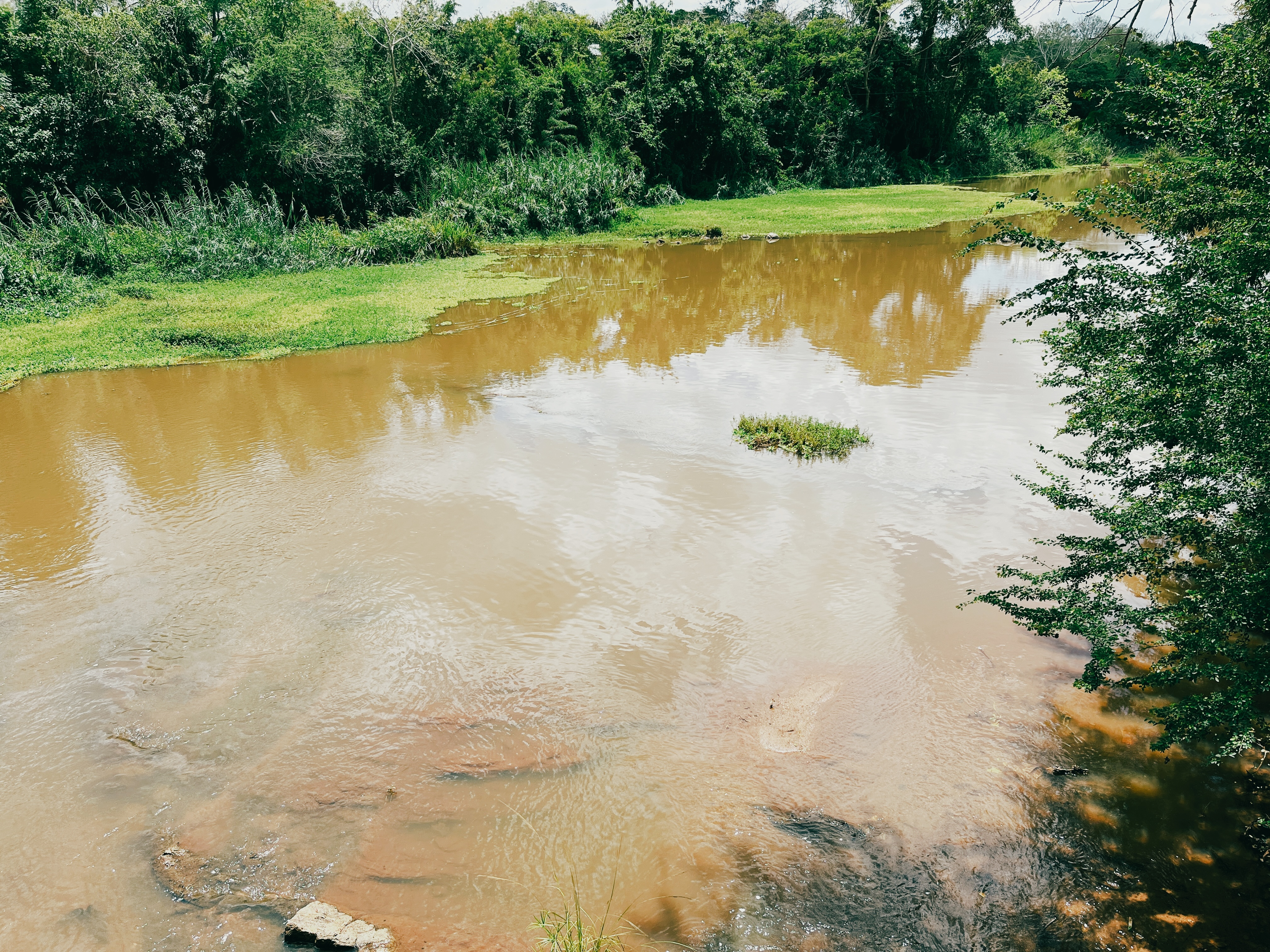
View of Sigi River in Mnyanzini Ward, Mkinga

== Hydrometrie ==
Average monthly flow of Zigi measured at the hydrological station in Lanconi Estate, approximately 10 km above the Mabayani Dam in m³ / s (1957 - 1990). The Zigi flows stimulate time-dependent, like most rivers in the region.
