= List of lighthouses in Tanzania =

This is a list of lighthouses in Tanzania.

== Lighthouses ==
Image	Name	ARLHS	Year built	Location	Region	Structure	Tower height	Focal height	Flash interval
	Chumbe	TAN–016	1904	Chumbe Island	Mjini Magharibi	Stone tower	34 metres (112 ft)	37 metres (121 ft)	11 s
	Ras Mkumbi	TAN–011	1894	Mafia Island	Pwani	Masonry tower	30 metres (98 ft)	31 metres (102 ft)	5 s
	Ras Nungwi	TAN-025	1881	Unguja	Zanzibar North Region	Stone Tower	14 metres (46 ft)	18 metres (59 ft)	5 s

== See also ==
- List of lighthouses in Kenya (to the north)
- List of lighthouses in South Africa (to the south-east)
- Lists of lighthouses and lightvessels
