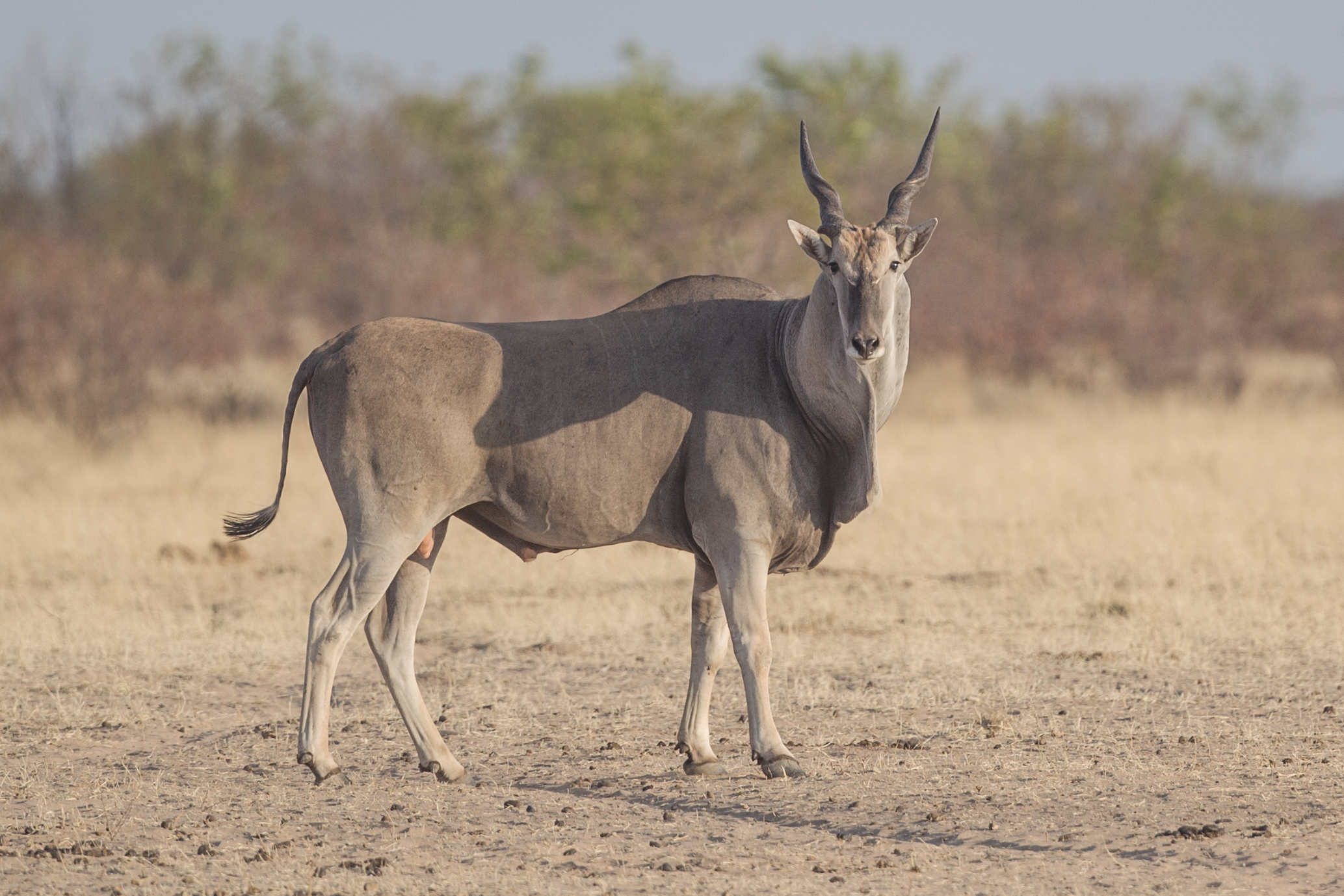
- young male T. o. oryx Etosha National Park, Namibia
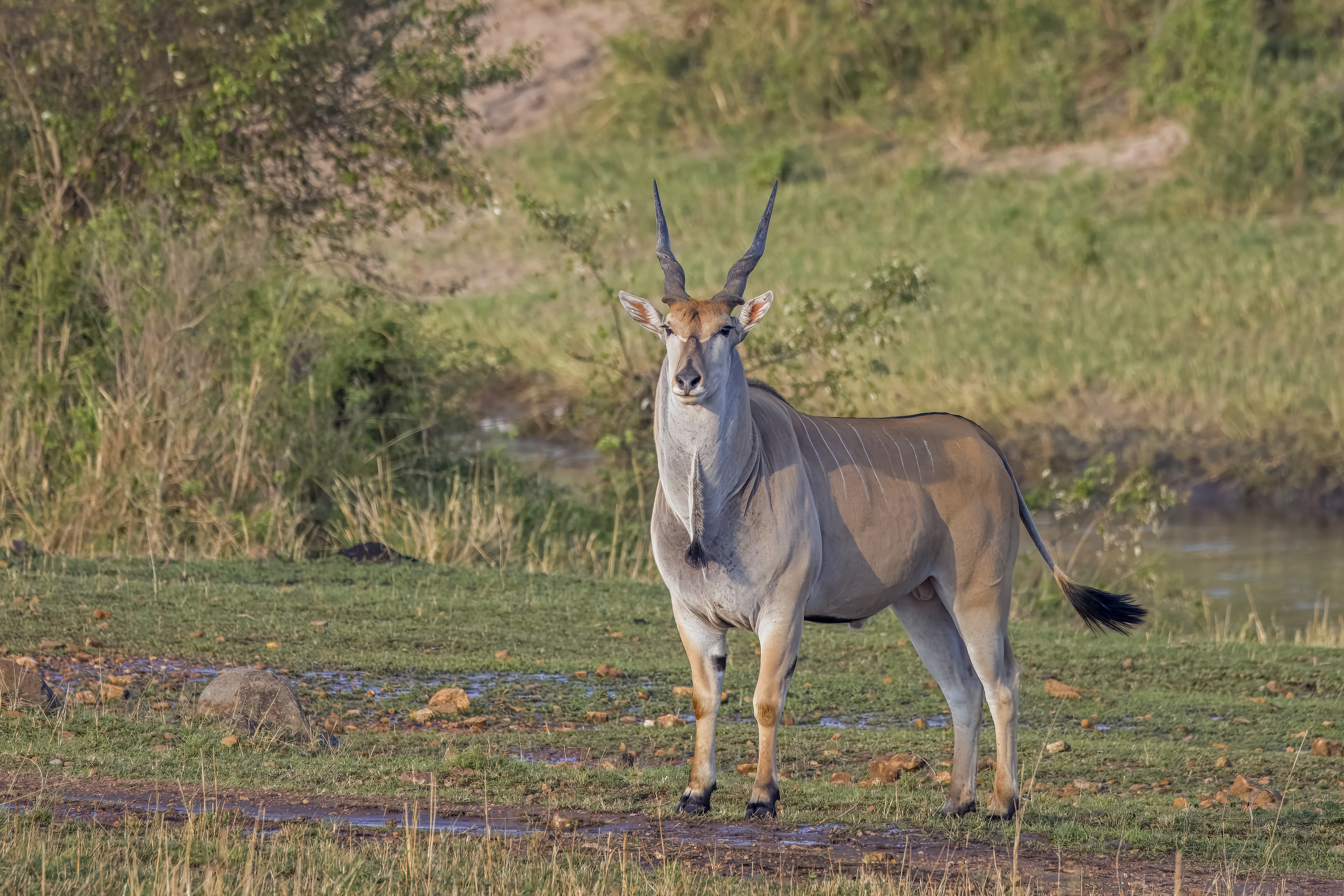
- male T. o. pattersonianus Serengeti National Park, Tanzania

Conservation status
- Least Concern (IUCN 3.1)

Scientific classification
- Kingdom: Animalia
- Phylum: Chordata
- Class: Mammalia
- Order: Artiodactyla
- Family: Bovidae
- Subfamily: Bovinae
- Genus: Tragelaphus
- Subgenus: Taurotragus
- Species: T. oryx

Binomial name
- Tragelaphus oryx (Pallas, 1766)

Subspecies
- T. o. livingstonii; T. o. oryx; T. o. pattersonianus
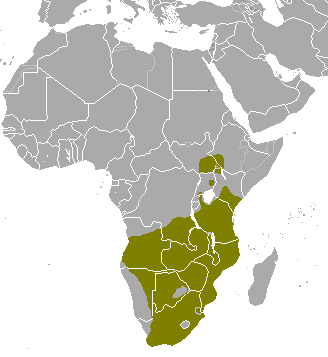
- native range

Synonyms
- Species synonymy: Tragelaphus oryx (Pallas, 1766); Taurotragus alces (Oken, 1816); Taurotragus canna (C. H. Smith, 1827); Taurotragus barbatus (Kerr, 1792); Taurotragus oreas (Pallas, 1777); Taurotragus typicus Selous, 1899; Taurotragus livingstonei (P. L. Sclater, 1864); Taurotragus billingae Kershaw, 1923; Taurotragus kaufmanni (Matschie, 1912); Taurotragus niediecki (Matschie, 1913); Taurotragus selousi Lydekker, 1910; Taurotragus triangularis (Günther, 1889); Taurotragus pattersonianus Lydekker, 1906

= Common eland =

Second largest antelope in the world

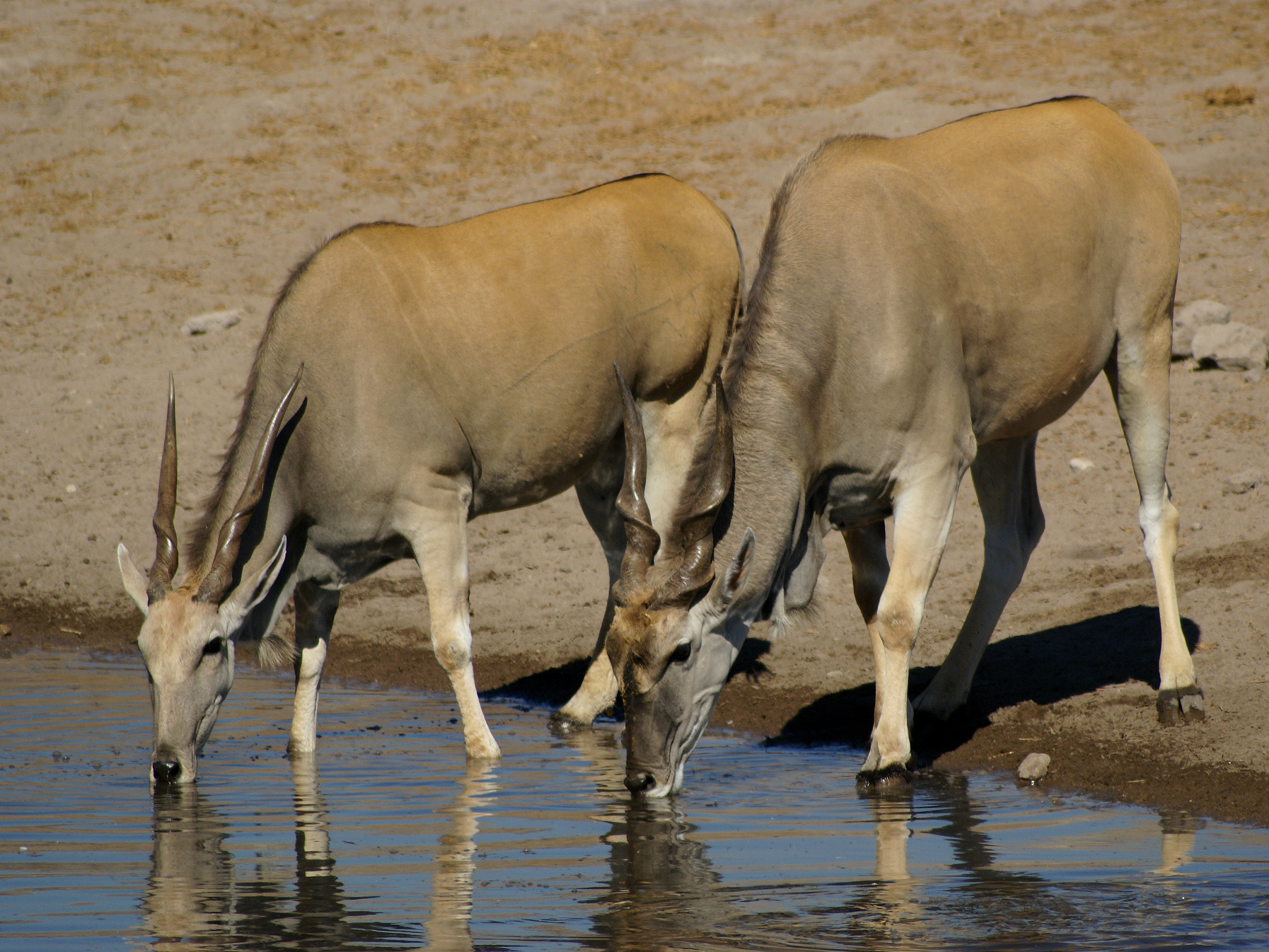
Drinking at Chudop waterhole in Etosha National Park

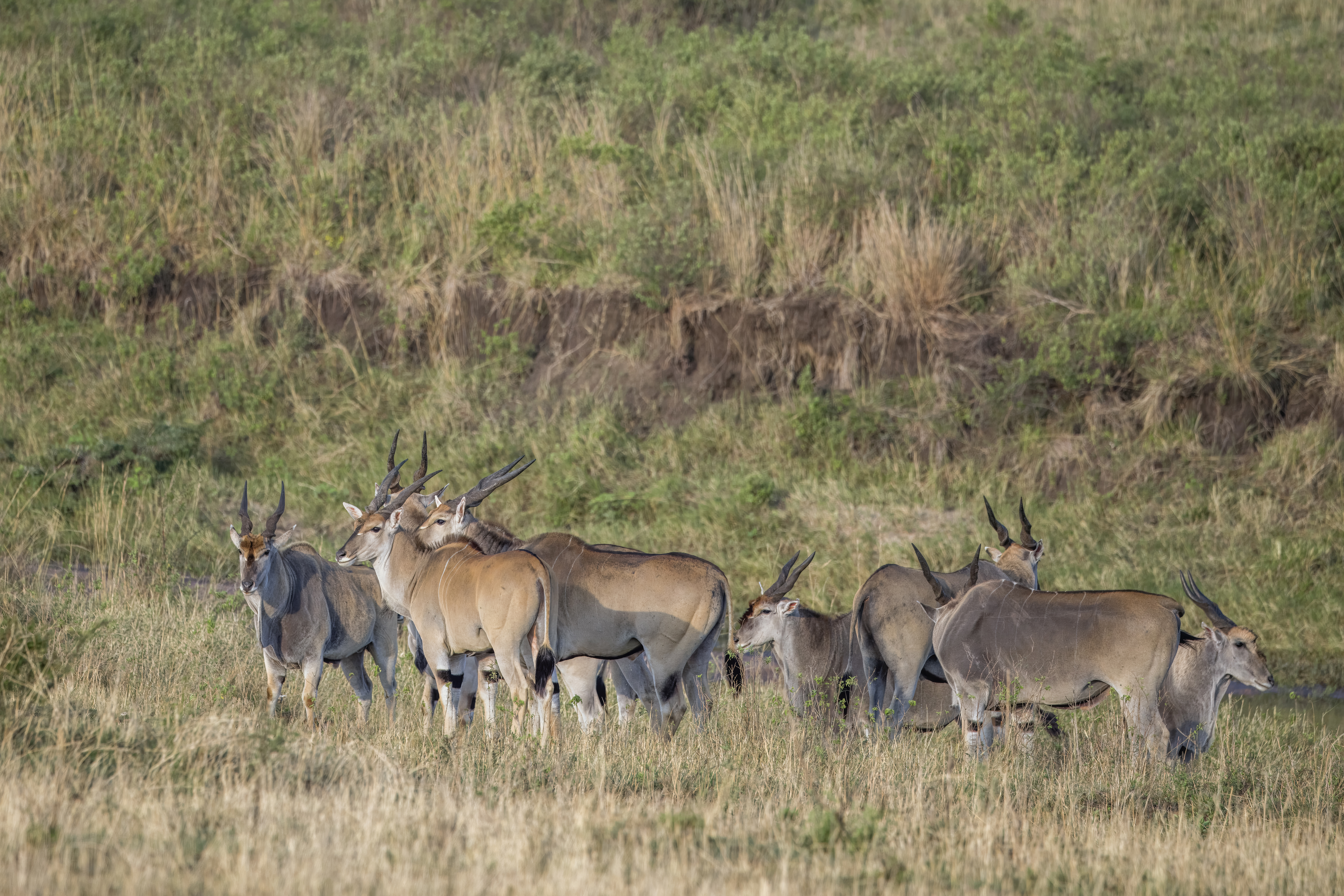
herd in Serengeti National Park

The common eland (Tragelaphus oryx), also known as the southern eland or eland antelope, is a large savannah and plains antelope found in East and Southern Africa. An adult male is around 1.6 m (5.2 ft) tall at the shoulder and can weigh up to 942 kg (2,077 lb) with a typical range of 500–600 kg (1,100–1,300 lb). Females are around 1.4 m (4.6 ft) tall and weigh 340–445 kg (750–981 lb). It was scientifically described by Peter Simon Pallas in 1766.

Mainly a herbivore, its diet is primarily grasses and leaves. Common elands form herds of up to 500 animals, but are not territorial. The common eland prefers habitats with a wide variety of flowering plants such as savannah, woodlands, and open and montane grasslands; it avoids dense forests. It uses loud barks, visual and postural movements, and the flehmen response to communicate and warn others of danger. The common eland is used by humans for leather and meat, and has been domesticated in southern Africa. Eland milk contains more butterfat than cow's milk, and can be stored for up to eight months.

It is native to Angola, Botswana, the Democratic Republic of the Congo, Eswatini, Ethiopia, Kenya, Lesotho, Malawi, Mozambique, Namibia, Rwanda, South Africa, South Sudan, Tanzania, Uganda, Zambia, and Zimbabwe, but is no longer present in Burundi. While the common eland's population is decreasing, it is classified as of least concern by the International Union for Conservation of Nature.

== Etymology ==
The scientific name of the common eland is Tragelaphus oryx. The genus name is not of modern scientific invention, but comes from ancient Greek τραγέλαφος (tragélaphos), from τράγος (trágos), meaning a "male goat", and ἔλαφος (élaphos), meaning a "deer". Oryx is Latin and Greek (genitive: orygos) for pickaxe, referring to the pointed horns of North African antelopes like the common eland and scimitar-horned oryx.

The name eland is Afrikaans for "elk" from Dutch eland of same meaning, from obsolete German Elend, probably from obsolete Lithuanian ellenis; eland itself is a direct English cognate (thus doublet) of "elk". When Dutch settlers came to the Cape of Good Hope, creating the Dutch Cape Colony, they named the animal after the large, herbivorous moose. In Dutch, the animal is called "eland antelope" to distinguish it from the moose found in northern boreal forests. Another term absorbed into Afrikaans to refer to elands in general is impofu from surrounding Bantu languages like Zulu and Swazi.

== Physical description ==
Common elands are spiral-horned antelopes. They are sexually dimorphic, with females being smaller than the males. Females weigh 300–600 kg (660–1,320 lb), measure 200–280 cm (79–110 in) from the snout to the base of the tail and stand 125–153 cm (49–60 in) at the shoulder. Bulls weigh 400–942 kg (882–2,077 lb), are 240–345 cm (94–136 in) from the snout to the base of the tail and stand 150–183 cm (59–72 in) at the shoulder. The tail is 50–90 cm (20–35 in) long. Male elands can weigh up to 1,000 kg (2,200 lb).

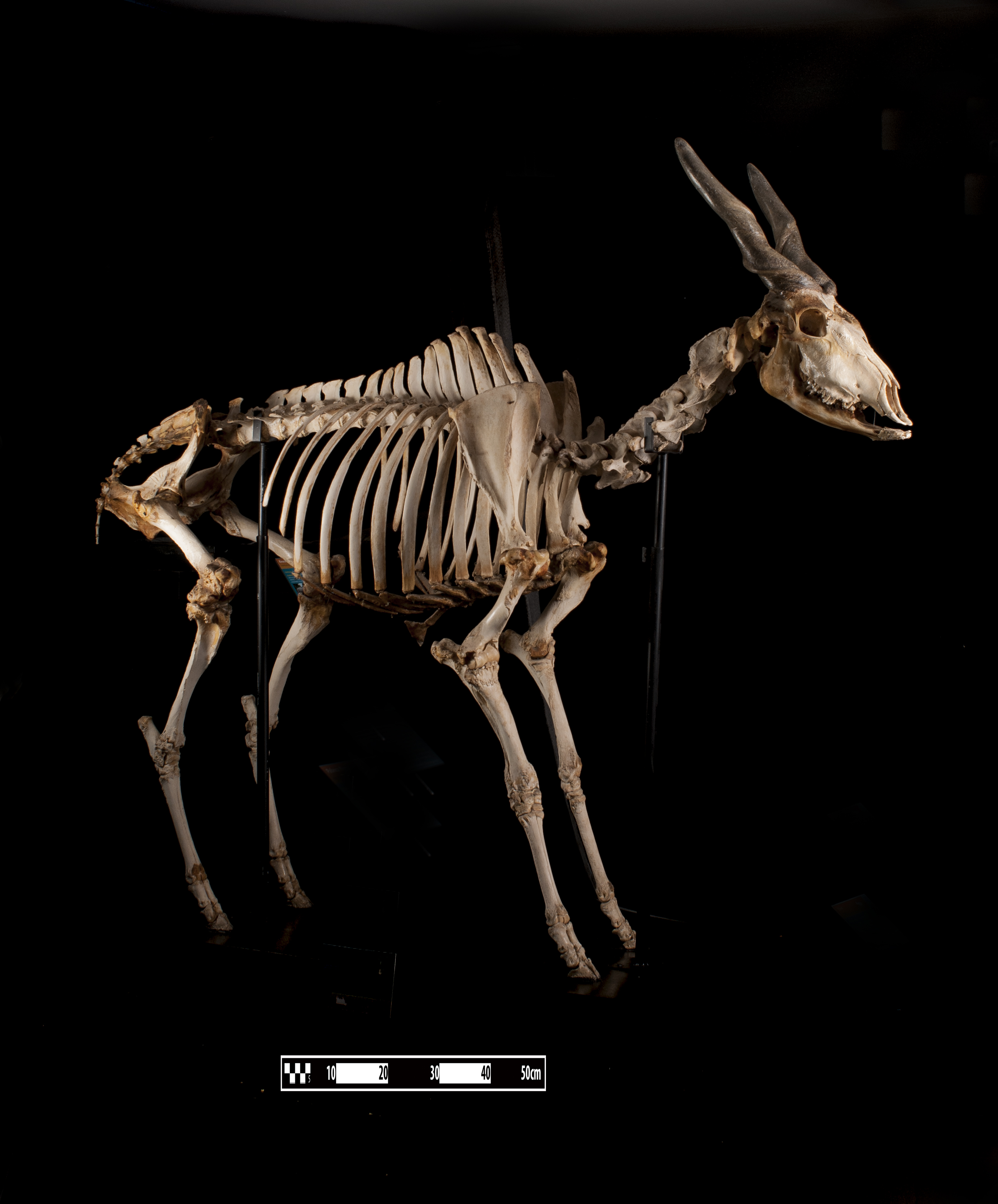
Skeleton

Their coat differs geographically, with elands in northern part of their range having distinctive markings (torso stripes, markings on legs, dark garters and a spinal crest) that are absent in the south. Apart from a rough mane, the coat is smooth. Females have a tan coat, while the coats of males are darker, with a bluish-grey tinge. Bulls may also have a series of vertical white stripes on their sides (mainly in parts of the Karoo in South Africa). As males age, their coat becomes more grey. Males also have dense fur on their foreheads and a large dewlap on their throats.

Both sexes have horns with a steady spiral ridge (resembling that of the bushbuck). The horns are visible as small buds in newborns and grow rapidly during the first seven months. The horns of males are thicker and shorter than those of females (males' horns are 43–66 cm (17–26 in) long and females' are 51–69 cm (20–27 in) long), and have a tighter spiral. Males use their horns during rutting season to wrestle and butt heads with rivals, while females use their horns to protect their young from predators.

The common eland is the slowest antelope, with a peak speed of 40 km/h (25 mph) that tires them quickly. However, they can maintain a 22 km/h (14 mph) trot indefinitely. Elands are capable of jumping up to 2.5 m (8 ft 2 in) from a standing start when startled (up to 3 m (9.8 ft) for young elands). The common eland's life expectancy is generally between 15 and 20 years; in captivity, some live up to 25 years.

Eland herds are accompanied by a loud clicking sound that has been subject to considerable speculation. The weight of the animal may cause the two halves of its hooves to splay apart, and the clicking is the result of the hoof snapping together when the animal raises its leg. The sound carries some distance from a herd, and may be a form of communication.

== Taxonomy ==
- - - - - - - Taurotragus
              - Giant eland
              - Common eland
            - - Strepsiceros
                Greater kudu
              - Tragelaphus
                - Mountain nyala
                - - - - Bongo
                      - Sitatunga
                    - - - - Cape bushbuck
                          - Harnessed bushbuck
          - Nyala
            Lowland nyala
        - Ammelaphus
          Lesser kudu

Phylogenetic relationships of the mountain nyala from combined analysis of all molecular data (Willows-Munro et.al. 2005). Subgenera (stem labels) per MDD.

The common eland was first described in 1766 by German zoologist and botanist Peter Simon Pallas. It belongs to the order Artiodactyla, family Bovidae, and subfamily Bovinae. The common eland is in the Taurotragus subgenus of the genus Tragelaphus on the basis of molecular phylogenetics, along with the giant eland (T. derbianus).

=== Subspecies ===
Three subspecies of common elands have been recognized, though their validity has been disputed.

- T. o. oryx (Pallas, 1766; Cape eland): also called alces, barbatus, canna and oreas. It is found in Southern and southwestern Africa. The fur is tawny and adults lose their stripes.
- T. o. livingstonii (Sclater, 1864; Livingstone's eland): also called kaufmanni, niediecki, selousi and triangularis. It is found in the Central Zambezian miombo woodlands. Livingstone's eland has brown fur with up to 12 stripes.
- T. o. pattersonianus (Lydekker, 1906; East African eland or Patterson's eland): also called billingae. It is found in East Africa, hence its common name. Like Livingstone's eland, its fur can also have up to 12 stripes.

Found by and named after John Henry Patterson, who describes the specimen in The Man-eaters of Tsavo (1907).

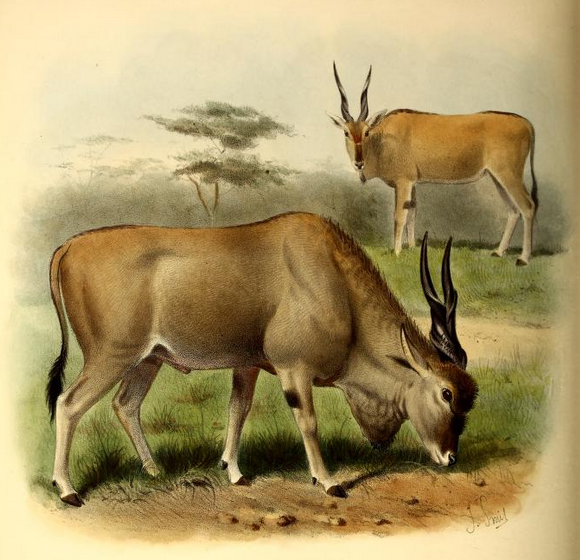
Illustration of T. o. oryx

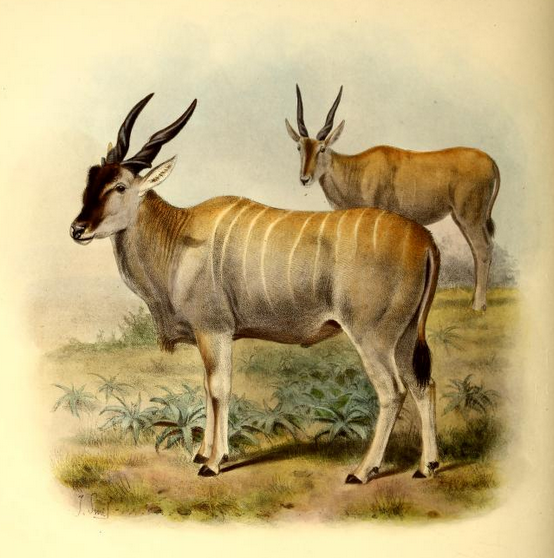
Illustration of T. o. livingstonii

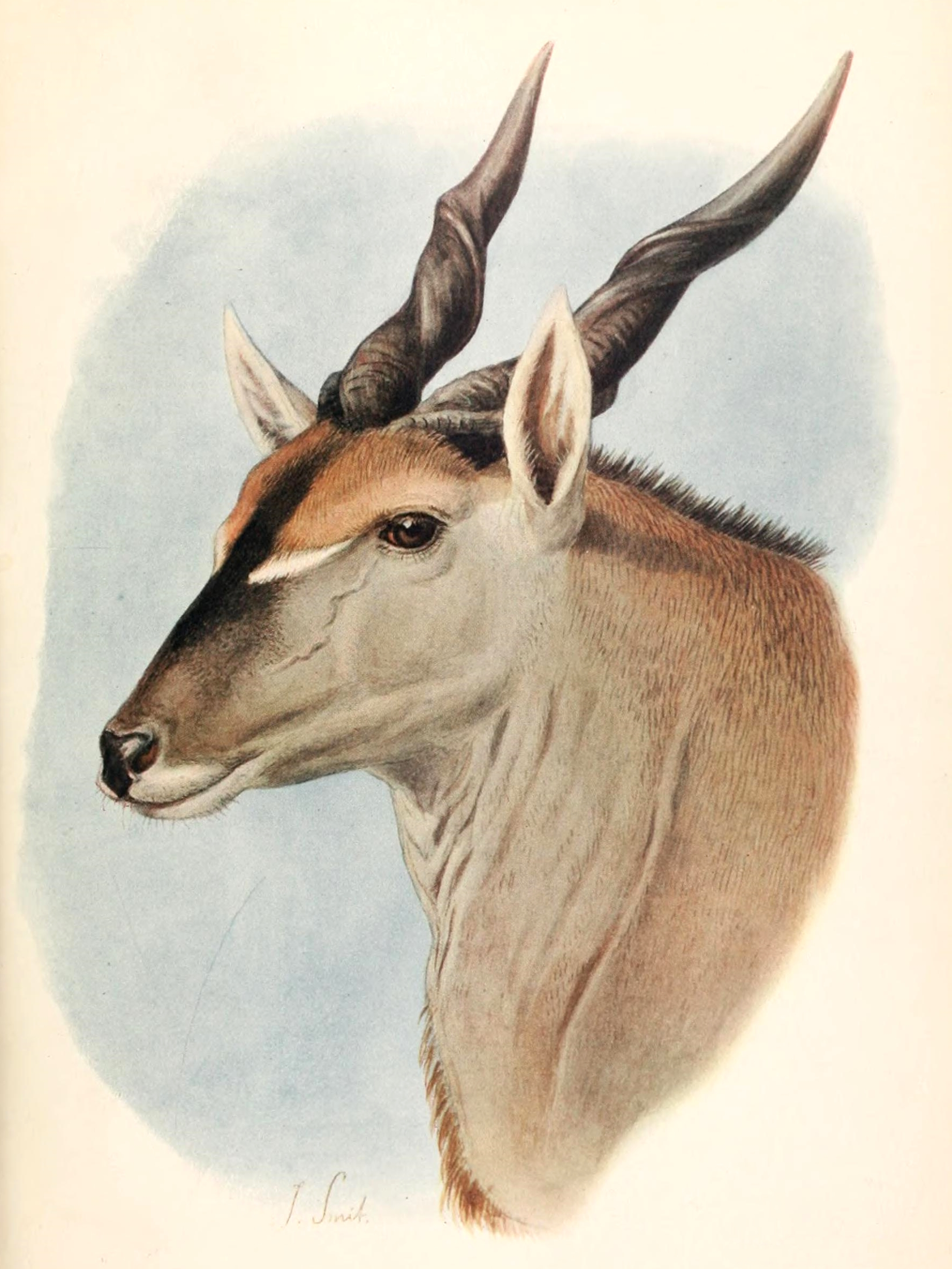
Illustration of T. o. pattersonianus

== Genetics and evolution ==
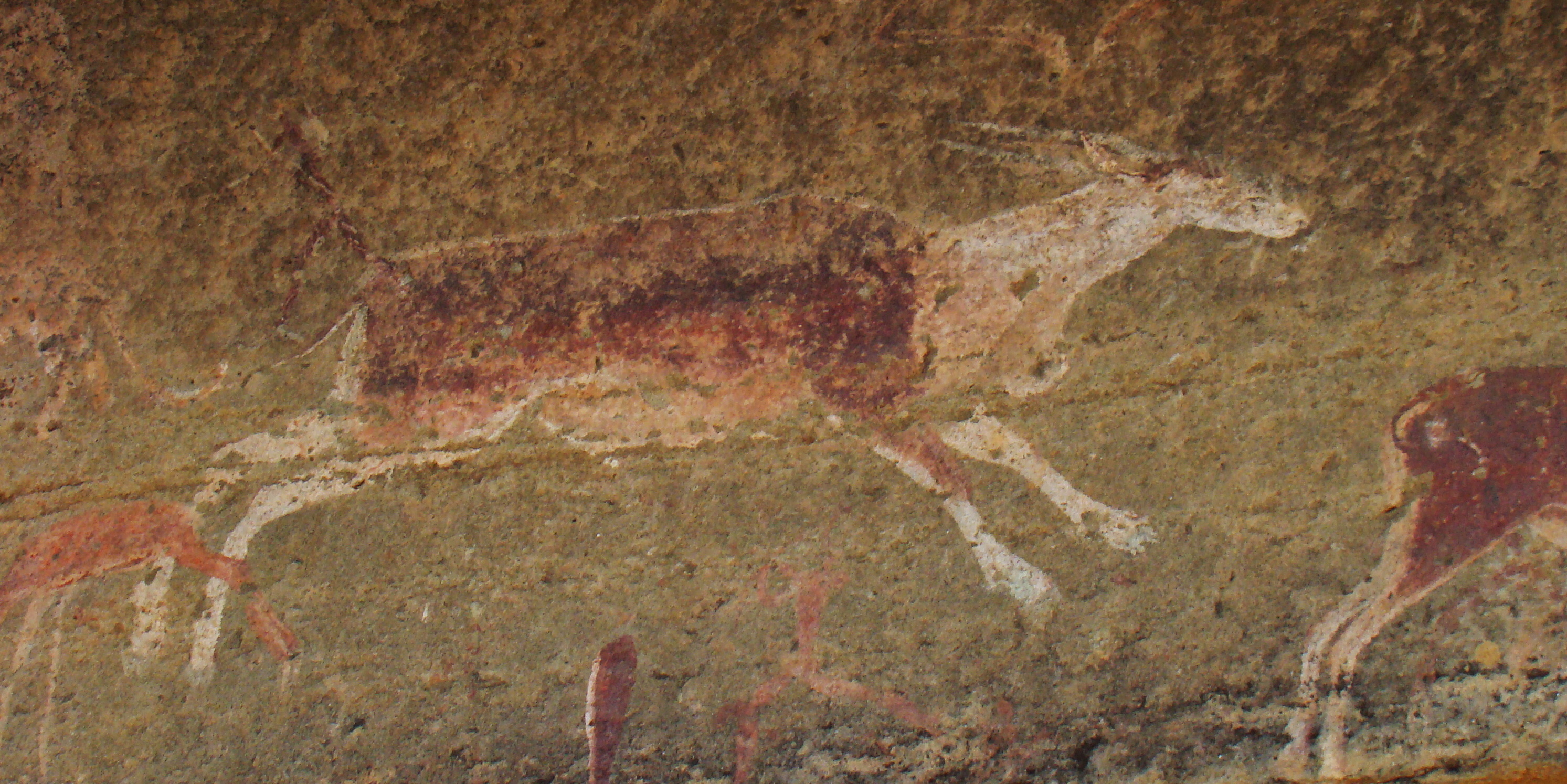
Rock art produced by the San people depicting an eland, Clarens Formation, South Africa

Male elands have 31 diploid chromosomes and females have 32. The male (Y) chromosome has been translocated to the short arm of an autosome. Both the X chromosome and Y chromosome replicate late; they do not match well and are variable. The chromosomes resemble those of the greater kudu (Tragelaphus strepsiceros).

Male elands and female greater kudus can produce a viable male hybrid, though whether it is sterile is unknown. An accidental crossing of an East African common eland (T. o. pattersonianus) with an East African kudu (T. s. bea) occurred in the San Diego Zoo Safari Park. This was believed to be due to the absence of male kudus in the herd. The hybrid produced was sterile. The study confirmed the chromosome numbers of both the eland and the kudu and the strangeness of their attached Y chromosomes. Attempt matings of male elands with domestic (Bos primigenius) and zebu cows (Bos indicus) indicated the species are not able to interbreed. Female elands have acted as surrogates for bongos.

The Bovidae family ancestors of the common eland arose approximately 20 million years ago in Africa; fossils are found throughout Africa and France, but the best records are in sub-Saharan Africa. The first members of the tribe Tragelaphini appear six million years ago during the late Miocene. An extinct ancestor of the common eland (Taurotragus arkelli) appears in the Pleistocene in northern Tanzania and the first T. oryx fossil appears in the Holocene in Algeria.

In 2010, a genetic study was made basing on the evolutionary history of common elands. Using material from East and Southern Africa, analysis of mitochondrial DNA control-region fragments from 122 individuals revealed information concerning the phylogeography, genetic diversity, and demographic history of the species. The conclusions supported the presence of a long-standing population in the southern Africa and a mosaic of Pleistocene refugia in eastern Africa. The similarity of dates obtained from other studies indicates a significant genetic event around 200 ka.

== Habitat and distribution ==
Common elands live on the open plains of Southern Africa and along the foothills of the great southern African plateau. The species extends north into Ethiopia and most arid zones of South Sudan, west into eastern Angola and Namibia, and south to South Africa. However, a low density of elands exists in Africa due to poaching and human settlement.

Elands prefer to live in semiarid areas that contain many shrub-like bushes, and often inhabit grasslands, woodlands, subdesert, bush, and mountaintops with altitudes of about 15,000 ft (4,600 m). Elands do, however, avoid forests, swamps and deserts. The places inhabited by elands generally contain Acacia, Combretum, Commiphora, Diospyros, Grewia, Rhus, and Ziziphus trees and shrubs; some of these also serve as their food.

Eland can be found in many national parks and reserves today, including Nairobi National Park and Tsavo East National Park, Tsavo West National Park, Masai Mara National Reserve, (Kenya); Serengeti National Park, Ruaha National Park and Tarangire National Park, Ngorongoro Crater, (Tanzania); Kagera National Park (Rwanda); Nyika National Park (Malawi); Lake Mburo National Park (Uganda); Kidepo Valley National Park (Uganda); Luangwa Valley and Kafue National Park (Zambia); Hwange National Park, Matobo National Park, Tuli Safari Area and Chimanimani Eland Sanctuary (Zimbabwe); Kruger National Park, Kgalagadi Transfrontier Park, Giant's Castle and Suikerbosrand NR (South Africa).

They live on home ranges that can be 200–400 km^{2} for females and juveniles and 50 km^{2} for males.

== Ecology and behavior ==
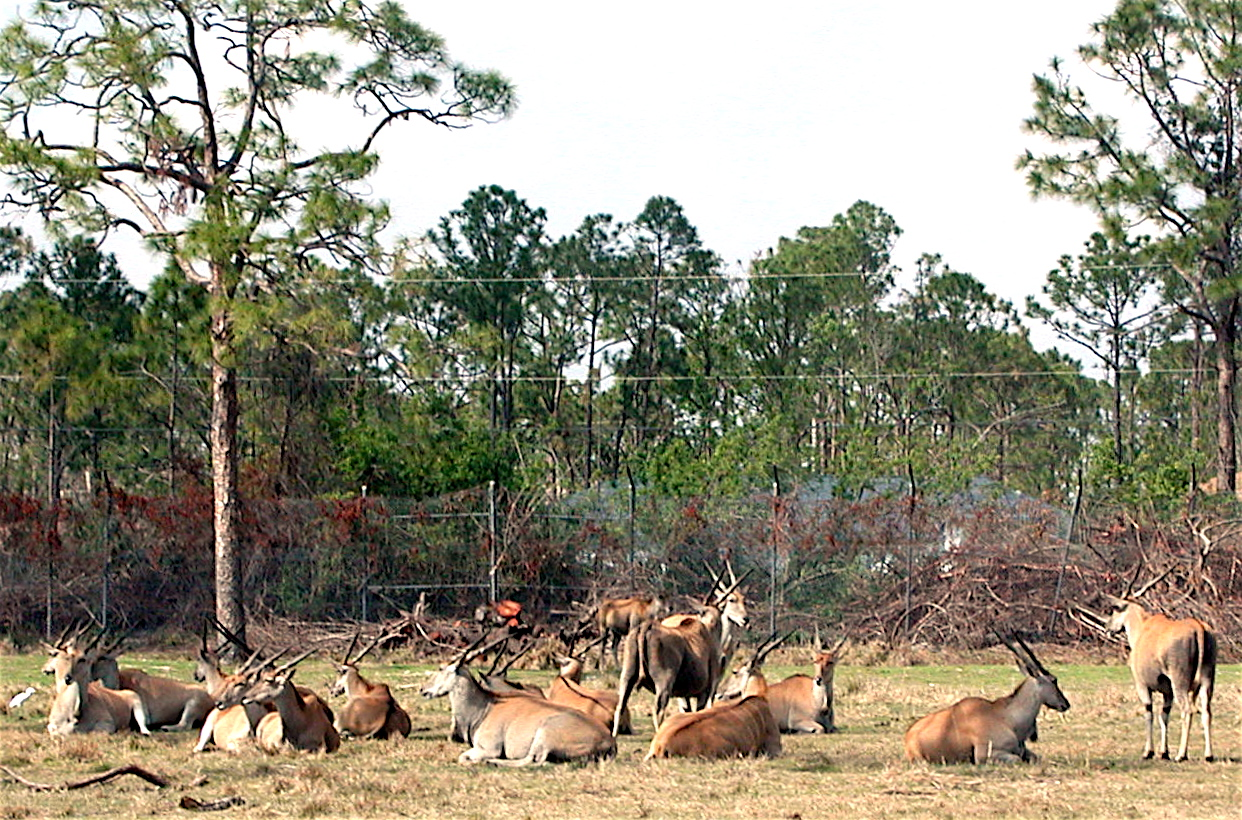
Resting in herds

Common elands are nomadic and crepuscular. They eat in the morning and evening, rest in shade when hot, and remain in sunlight when cold. They are commonly found in herds numbering up to 500, with individual members remaining in the herd from several hours to several months. Juveniles and mothers tend to form larger herds, while males may separate into smaller groups or wander individually. During estrus, mainly in the rainy season, groups tend to form more regularly. In Southern Africa, common elands will often associate with herds of zebras, roan antelopes and oryxes.

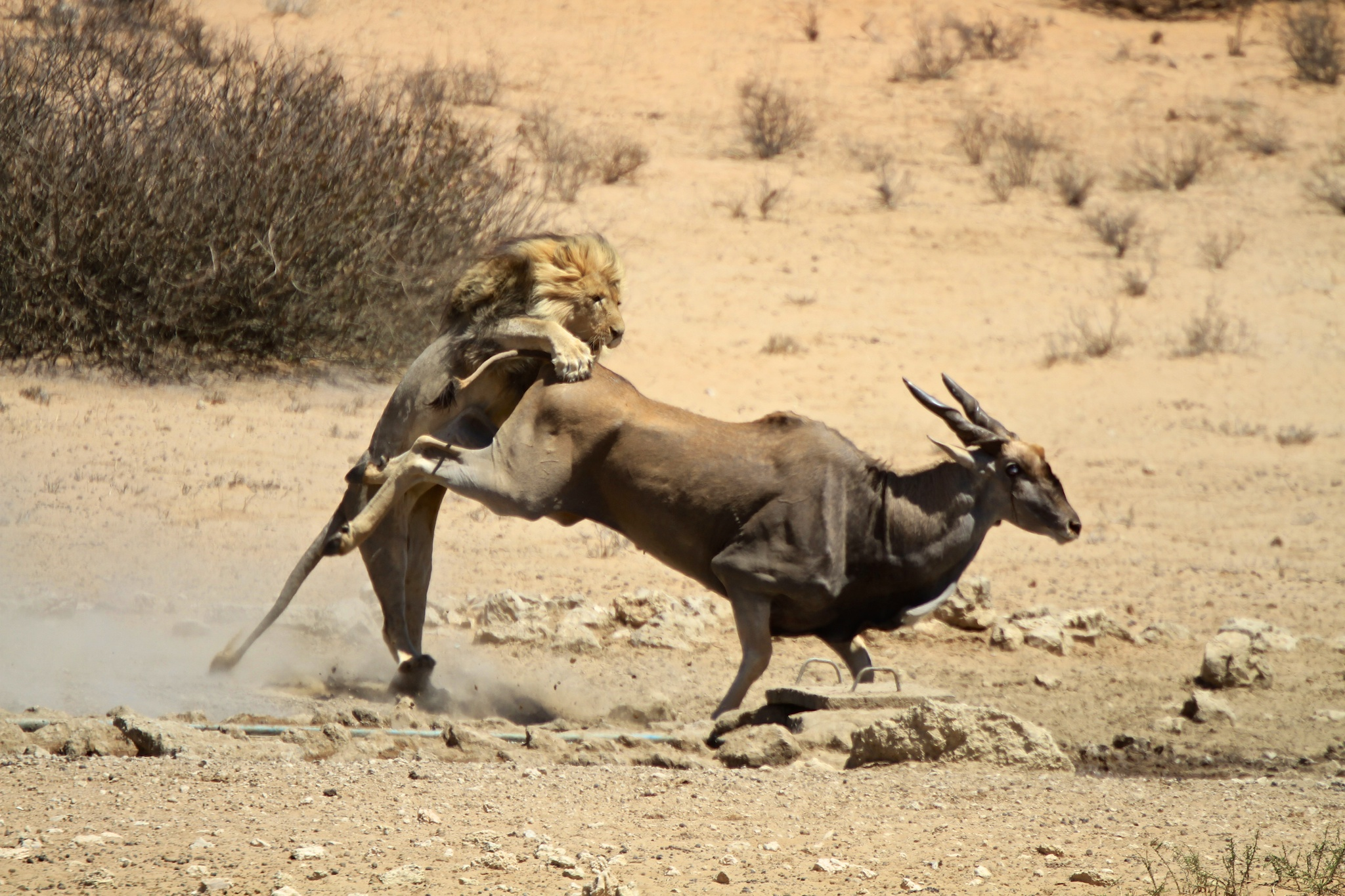
A lion hunting a cape eland (T. o. oryx), in Kgalagadi Transfrontier Park

Common elands communicate via gestures, vocalizations, scent cues, and display behaviors. The flehmen response also occurs, primarily in males in response to contact with female urine or genitals. Females urinate to indicate fertility during the appropriate phase of their estrous cycle, as well as to indicate their lack of fertility when harassed by males. If eland bulls find any of their predators nearby, they bark and attempt to attract the attention of others by trotting back and forth until the entire herd is conscious of the danger. Some of their main predators include lions, African wild dogs, cheetahs, and spotted hyenas. Eland calves are more vulnerable than adults to their predators.

=== Diet ===
Common elands are herbivores that browse during drier winter, but have also adapted to grazing during the rainy season when grasses are more common and nutritious. They require a high-protein diet of succulent leaves from flowering plants, but will consume lower-quality plant material if available, including forbs, trees, shrubs, grasses, seeds, and tubers. Grasses that elands eat include Setaria and Themeda and fruits from Securinega and Strychnos. Large antelope can survive on lower-quality food in times of little rain.

Most of their water is obtained from their food, though they drink water when available. As they quickly adjust to the surroundings due to seasonal changes and other causes, they change their feeding habits. They also use their horns to break off branches that are hard to reach.

=== Thermoregulation ===
Common elands have several thermoregulatory adaptations to help them withstand the extreme temperatures of their environments. Using peripheral thermal receptors on the skin, elands can sense heat and increase or decrease evaporative cooling accordingly. On sunnier days, common elands maintain a cooler skin temperature relative to their inner body temperature. Elands achieve cooler skin temperatures by increasing cutaneous evaporation. This allows them to feel cooler, even though their internal body temperature stays relatively the same throughout the day. The eland can also conserve water by increasing its body temperature. When temperatures rise above a certain threshold, an increase in sweating and panting is also observed. Common elands use their sparse fur coats to dissipate excess heat via reradiation. The dewlap is also believed to play a role in thermoregulation. Due to its high surface area to volume ratio, it may allow for efficient thermoregulation in larger common elands with larger dewlaps.

=== Sociability and reproduction ===
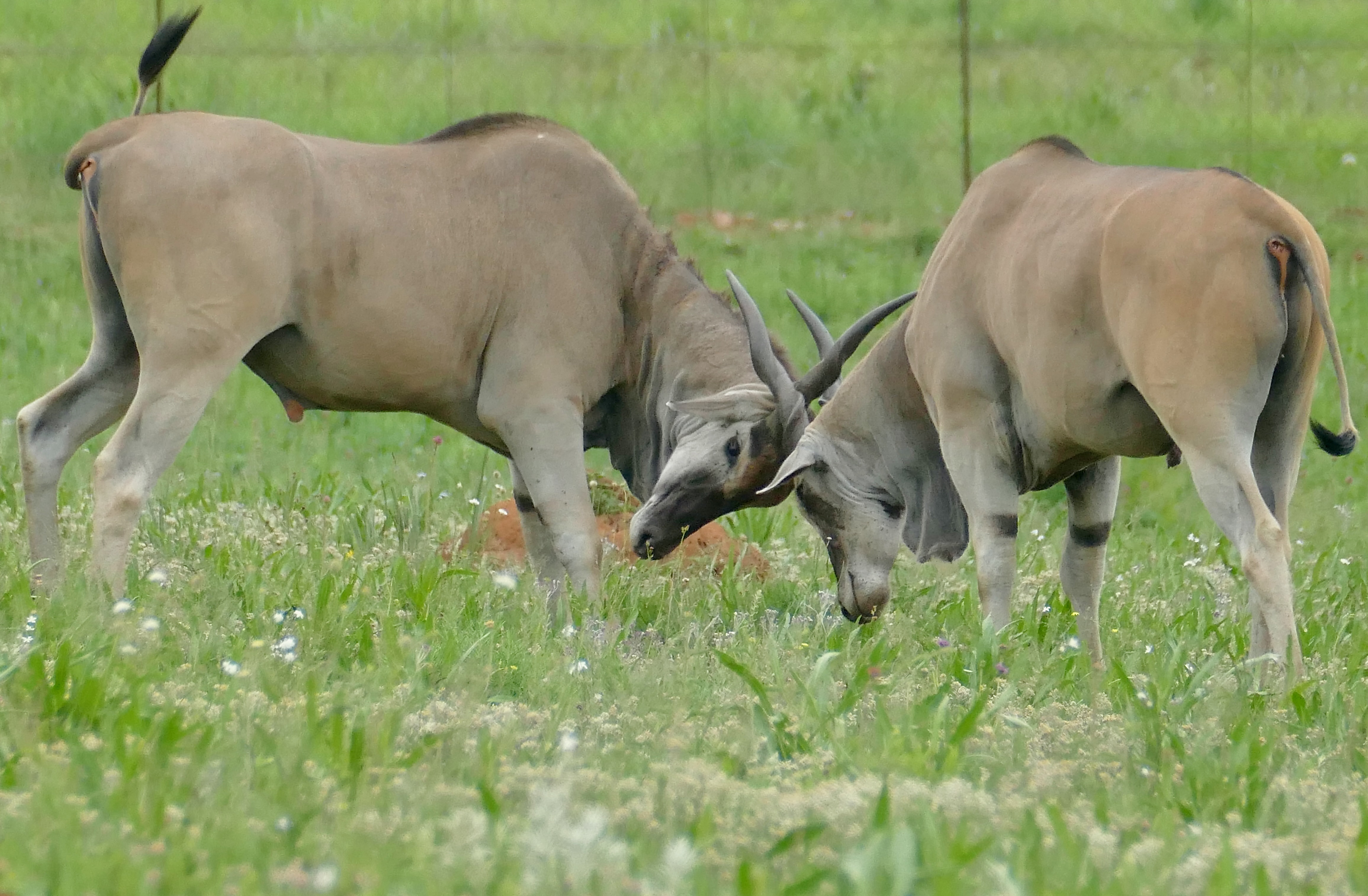
Two males fighting over dominance at Rietvlei Nature Reserve

Females are sexually mature at 15 to 36 months and males at 4 to 5 years. Mating may occur anytime after reaching sexual maturity, but is mostly seen in the rainy season. In Zambia, young are born in July and August, while elsewhere this is the mating season. Mating begins when elands gather to feed on lush, green plains with plentiful grass, and some males and females start mating with each other in separate pairs. Males chase the females to find out if they are in estrus. They also test the female's urine. Usually, a female chooses the most dominant and fit male to mate with. Sometimes, she runs away from males trying to mate, causing more attraction. This results in fights between males, in which their hard horns are used. A female allows a male to mount after two to four hours. Males usually keep close contact with females in the mating period. The dominant male can mate with more than one female. Females have a gestation period of nine months, and give birth to only one calf each time.

Males, females, and juveniles each form separate social groups. The male groups are the smallest; the members stay together and search for food or water sources. The female group is much larger and covers greater areas. They travel the grassy plains in wet periods and prefer bushy areas in dry periods. Females have a complex linear hierarchy. The nursery and juvenile group is naturally formed when females give birth to calves. After about 24 hours of the delivery, the mother and calf join this group. The calves start befriending each other and stay back in the nursery group, while the mother returns to the female group. The calves leave the nursery group when they are at least two years old and join a male or female group.

=== Diseases and parasites ===
Common elands are resistant to trypanosomiasis, a protozoan infection that has the tsetse fly as a vector, but not to the Rhipicephalus-transmitted disease theileriosis. The disease-causing bacterium Theileria taurotragi has caused many eland deaths. Clostridium chauvoei, another bacterium, can be harmful, as well. Elands are also hosts to several kinds of ticks. In one study, an eland was found to be host to the Amblyomma species A. gemma and A. variegatum, and Rhipicephalus species R. decoloratus, R. appendiculatus, R. evertsi, R. pulchellus and R. pravus. Elands produce antibodies for Brucella bacteria, but none for Mycobacterium paratuberculosis or various types of pneumonia like contagious bovine pneumonia and contagious caprine pneumonia, normally infectious in cows or antelopes.

== Interaction with humans ==
=== Conservation ===
Currently, common elands are not endangered. They are conserved by the United States Endangered Species Act, and regulated in international trade by the Convention on International Trade in Endangered Species. A 2016 assessment for the International Union for Conservation of Nature (IUCN) Red List estimates the number of mature individuals to be 90,000-110,000, with populations considered stable or increasing in the countries of Namibia, Botswana, Zimbabwe, South Africa, Malawi, Kenya and Tanzania.

The population is, however, gradually decreasing due to habitat loss, caused by expanding human settlements and poaching for its superior meat. As they are docile and inactive most of the time, they can easily be killed. The species became extinct in Eswatini and Zimbabwe, but has been reintroduced.

The IUCN states that about half of the estimated total population lives in protected areas and 30% on private land. Protected areas that support major populations include Omo (Ethiopia), Serengeti, Katavi, Ruaha, and Selous-Kilombero (Tanzania), Kafue and North Luangwa (Zambia), Nyika (Malawi), Etosha (Namibia), Kgalagadi Transfrontier Park (Botswana/South Africa) and Ukhahlamba Drakensberg Park (South Africa). Most of these populations appear to be stable. Relatively large numbers of common elands now live on private land, particularly in Namibia, Zimbabwe, and South Africa, reflecting its value as a trophy animal. Common elands have also been widely domesticated in Zimbabwe, South Africa, Kenya, Russia, and Ukraine.

=== Uses ===
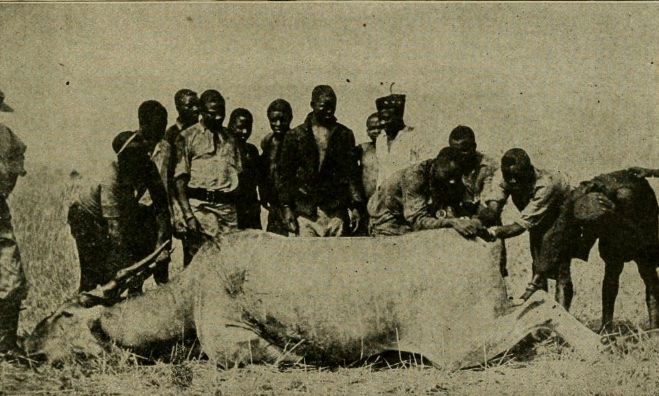
Being skinned for its leather

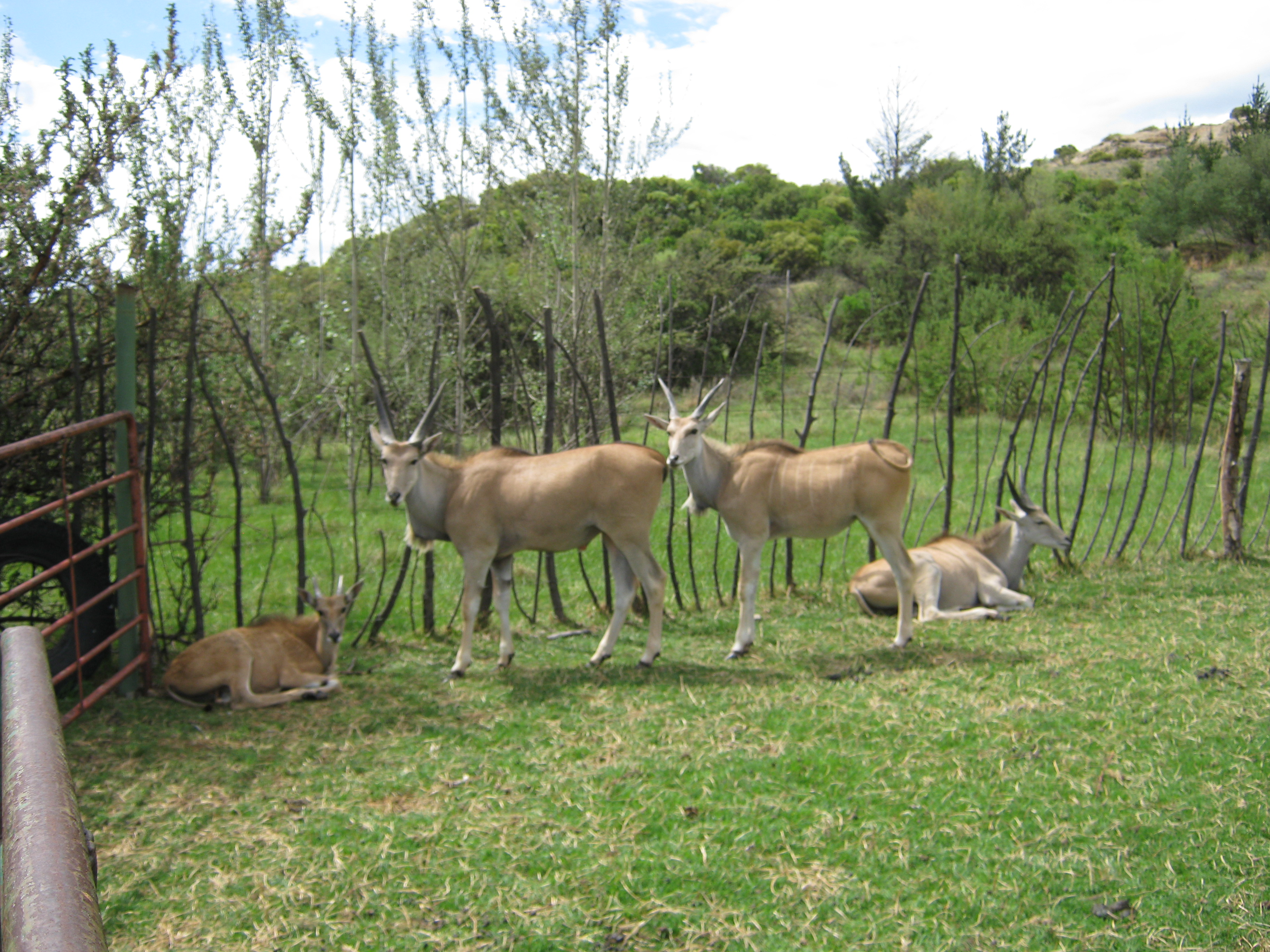
Domesticated elands

Coat of arms of Grootfontein, Namibia

The common eland is sometimes farmed and hunted for its meat, and in some cases can be better used than cattle because it is more suited to African climates. This has led to some Southern African farmers switching from cattle to eland. Common elands are also pictured as supporters in the coat of arms of Grootfontein, Namibia.

=== Husbandry ===
Common elands have a mild temperament and have been successfully domesticated for meat and milk production in South Africa and Russia. Their need for water is quite low because they produce urine with a high urea content, but they require a substantial grazing area, along with salt licks and large amounts of supplementary feed such as maize, sorghum, melons, and beans, which can be expensive. A female can produce up to 7 kg (15 lb) of milk per day that is richer in milkfat than cow milk. The pleasant-tasting milk has a butterfat content of 11-17% and can be stored for up to eight months if properly prepared, versus several days for cow milk.

Housing common elands is difficult due to their ability to jump over fences as high as 3 m (9.8 ft) or simply break through using their substantial mass. Sometimes, wild elands break through enclosures to mix with domesticated ones. Common elands can reproduce in captivity, but calf survival is low and the young may need to be separated from their mothers to ensure health and adequate feeding. Husbandry requires care because the generally placid animals startle easily and require large amounts of space.
