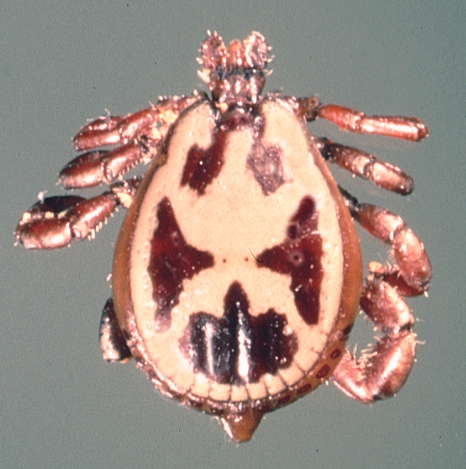
- Dorsal view of male.
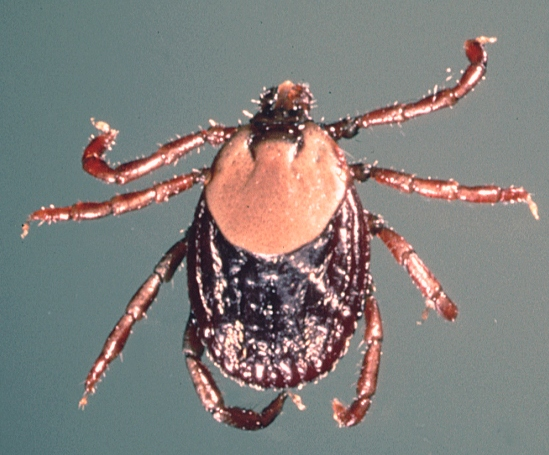
- Dorsal view of female

Scientific classification
- Kingdom: Animalia
- Phylum: Arthropoda
- Subphylum: Chelicerata
- Class: Arachnida
- Order: Ixodida
- Family: Ixodidae
- Genus: Rhipicephalus
- Species: R. pulchellus

Binomial name
- Rhipicephalus pulchellus (Gerstäcker, 1873)

Synonyms
- Dermacentor pulchellus Gerstäcker, 1873; Rhipicephalus marmoreus Pocock, 1900; Rhipicephalus (Eurhipephalus) pulchellus; Eurhipephalus pulchellus; Rhipicephalus (Lamellicauda) pulchellus; Rhipicephalus (Tendeirodes) pulchellus

= Rhipicephalus pulchellus =

Species of tick

The zebra tick or yellow back tick (Rhipicephalus pulchellus) is a species of hard tick. It is common in the Horn of Africa, with a habitat of the Rift Valley and eastward. It feeds upon a wide variety of species, including livestock, wild mammals, and humans, and can be a vector for various pathogens. The adult male has a distinctive black and ivory ornamentation on its scutum.

== Taxonomy and names ==
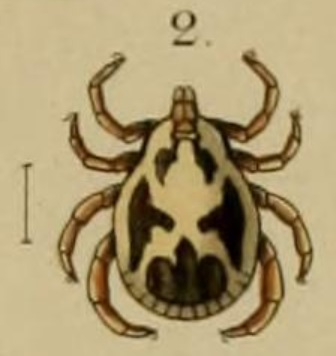
Male in Gerstaecker's description

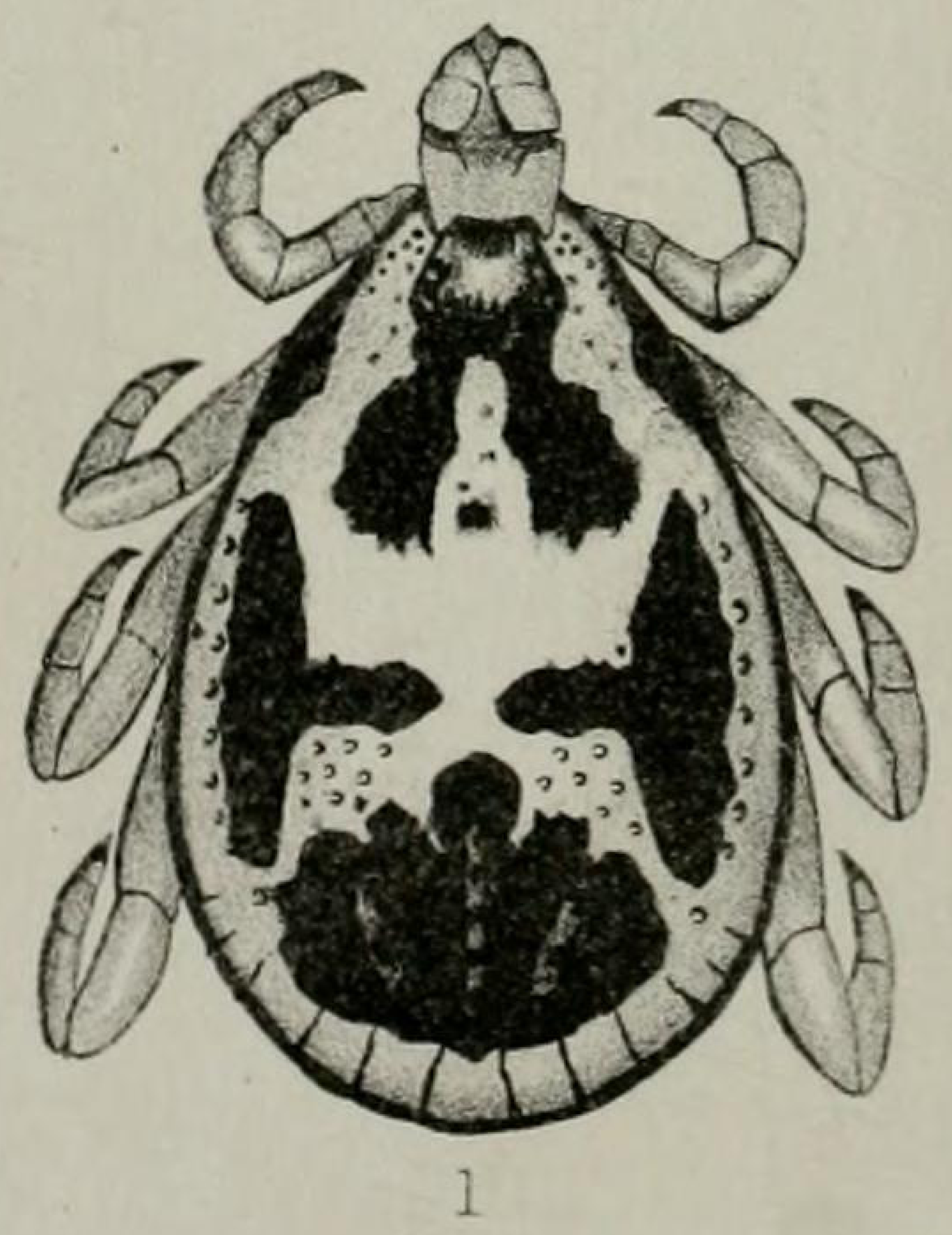
Male in Pocock's description

Rhipicephalus pulchellus was described by Carl Eduard Adolph Gerstaecker, who initially placed it in the genus Dermacentor due to the ornamentation; all Dermacentor ticks are ornate. Its syntypes are at the Museum für Naturkunde. Georges Neumann transferred this species to Rhipicephalus in 1897. R. I. Pocock described a junior synonym, R. marmoreus, in 1900; its holotype was deposited at the Natural History Museum, London. By 1901, Neumann had synonymized it with R. pulchellus.

In 1926, Maria Tonelli-Rondelli described a subspecies R. p. humeralis, but in 1949, Fritz Konrad Ernst Zumpt reclassified it as its own species, R. humeralis.

In 1904, Neumann circumscribed a new subgenus, (Eurhipicephalus), and included among its species R. (E.) pulchellus. Aldo Castellani and Albert J. Chalmers then referred to this species as Eurhipicephalus pulchellus, treating Neumann's subgenus as its own genus. B. I. Pomerantsev circumscribed a new Rhipicephalus subgenus (Lamellicauda) in 1936, which included R. (L.) pulchellus.

J. A. T. Santos Dias circumscribed a subgenus, (Tendeirodes) including R. (T.) pulchellus and the three other rhipicephalids with ornamentation, i.e., R. (T.) dux, R. (T.) humeralis, and R. (T.) maculatus, but this subgenus is not recognized by Jane Brotherton Walker and colleagues. In 1998, Pierre-Claude Morel created a pulchellus species group within the nominate subgenus (Rhipicephalus) consisting of these four species.

Based on the larval and nymphal forms of Rhipicephalus species, Walker and colleagues placed R. pulchellus in the R. appendiculatus species group, consisting of R. appendiculatus, R. armatus, R. carnivoralis, R. duttoni, R. humeralis, R. maculatus, R. muehlensi, R. nitens, R. pulchellus, R. sculptus, and R. zambeziensis.

In Neumann's 1901 description of R. maculatus, he mistakenly described female specimens of R. pulchellus as representing the female of this new species.

The specific epithets pulchellus and marmoreus are Latin adjectives meaning "beautiful little" and "made or consisting of marble", respectively; the word pulchellus is a diminutive of pulcher "beautiful". These refer to the male scutal pattern. It is also known by the common name "zebra tick" both due to its black and white ornamentation and having the zebra as a frequent host. It is also sometimes known as the "yellow-backed tick".

== Description ==
=== Adult male ===
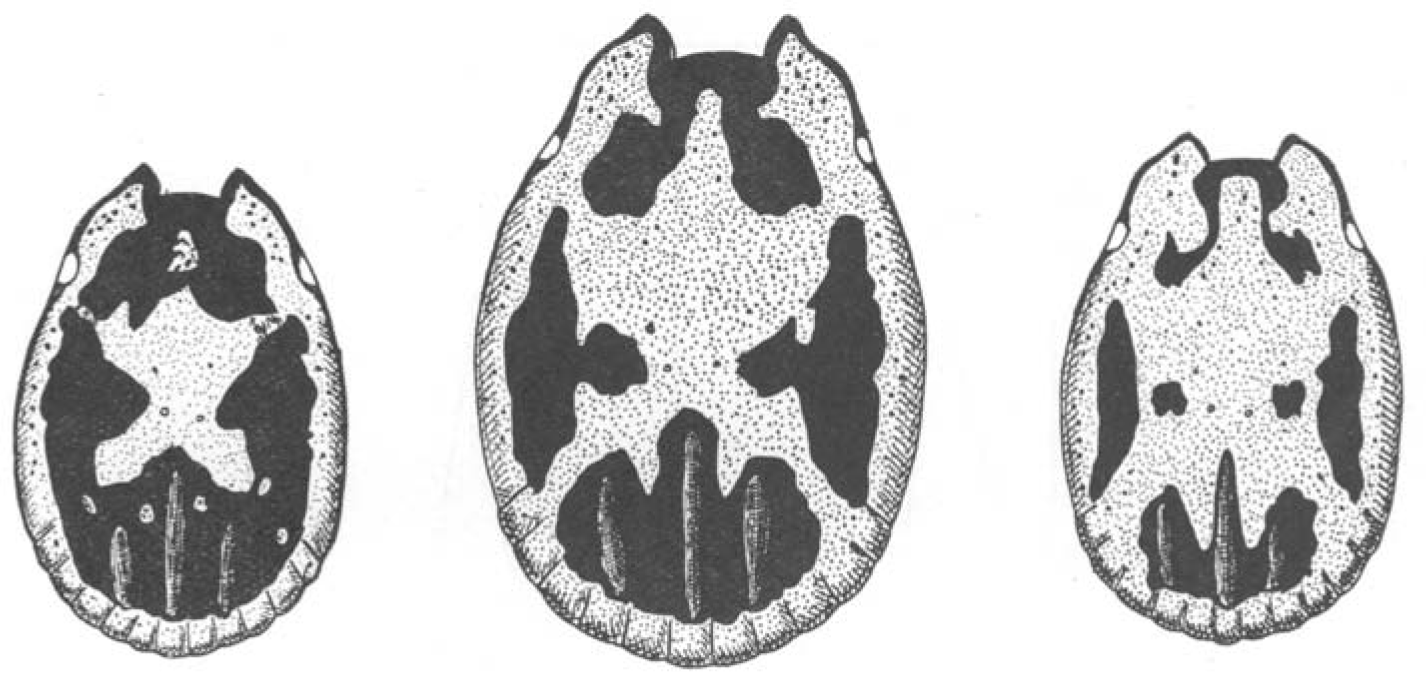
Variation in the ornamentation patterns of the male.

The males have ivory ornamentation surrounding the edge of the conscutum and much of its center. The male gnathosoma is significantly longer than it is broad, with dimensions of .84 mm × .69 mm (0.033 in × 0.027 in) to 1.07 mm × .83 mm (0.042 in × 0.033 in). Its conscutum measures 3.44 mm × 2.29 mm (0.135 in × 0.090 in) to 4.61 mm × 3.14 mm (0.181 in × 0.124 in).

=== Adult female ===
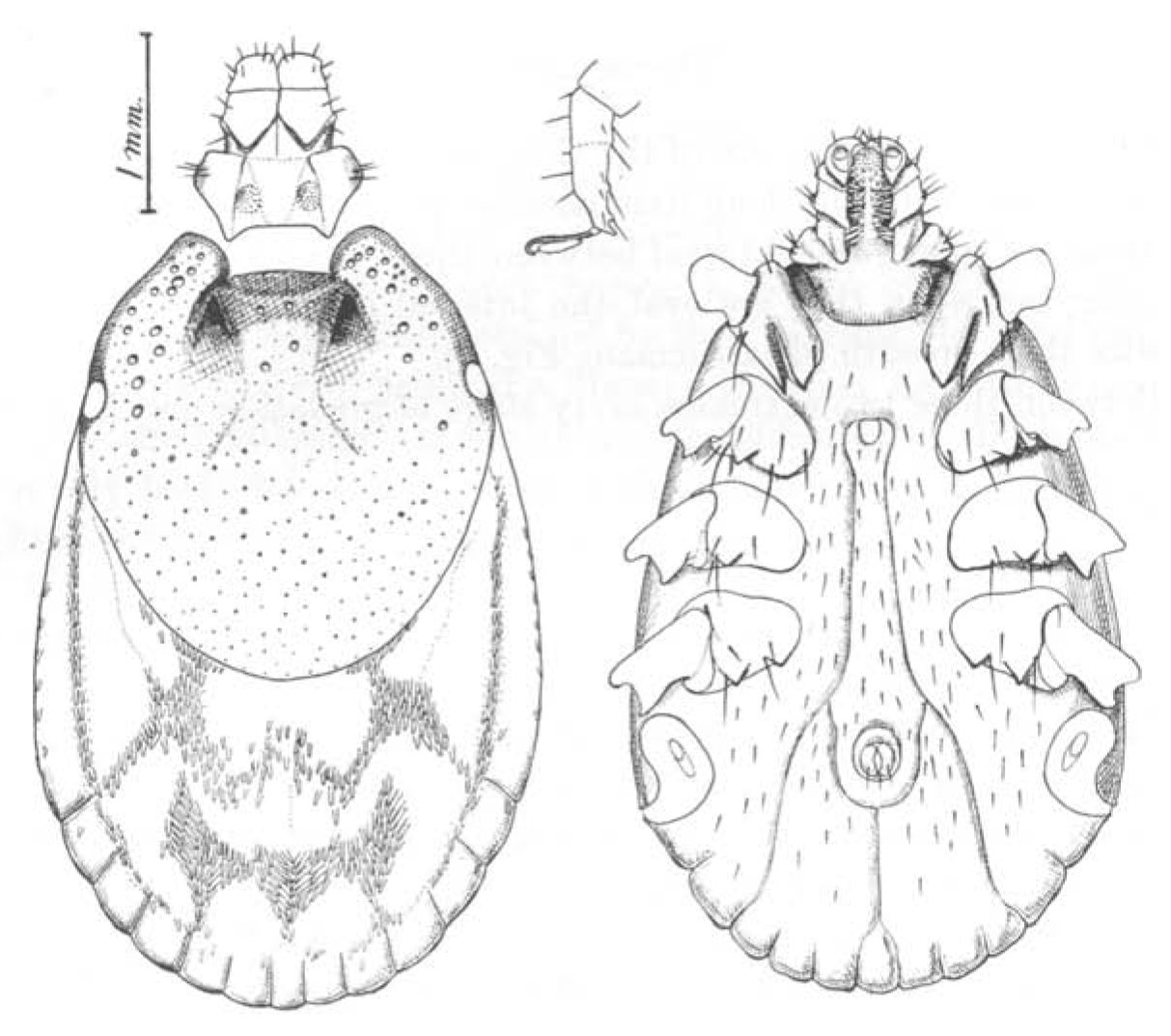
Large "extreme" of female R. pulchellus, showing dorsal and ventral views as well as its tarsus IV.

The female gnathosoma is slightly longer than it is broad, with dimensions of .8 mm × .77 mm (0.031 in × 0.030 in) to 1.02 mm × .98 mm (0.040 in × 0.039 in). Its scutum measure 1.82 mm × 1.68 mm (0.072 in × 0.066 in) to 2.5 mm × 2.17 mm (0.098 in × 0.085 in). Its scutum is mostly ivory colored and its alloscutum is dark brown.

== Hosts ==
This tick has been found on many species, including both livestock and wild animals, particularly ungulates; common hosts include Burchell's and Grevy's zebras, the black rhinoceros, and antelopes such as the gemsbok, eland, and hartebeest. In one study conducted in Kenya, hundreds of specimens were found on Masai giraffes.

They have been found on baboons in the Amboseli region of Kenya near Mount Kilimanjaro, although they only made up 1.8% of all ticks recorded in this study. These ticks have also been known to have elephants as their hosts.

Although they far less frequently parasitize birds than they do mammals, examples exist of the ostrich and the yellow-necked francolin as hosts for this species, as well.

It is a very common tick of cattle; in some parts of Ethiopia, 90% of all ticks collected from cattle and camels are R. pulchellus. This tick is present on 80% of cattle, and individuals are hosts to over 1000 of this tick each.

In one study, adult ticks were found on their hosts' neck and belly (45%), head (36%), forelegs (7%), hump region (13%), and hing legs (3%), with immature ticks found on the head and forelegs.

=== Humans ===
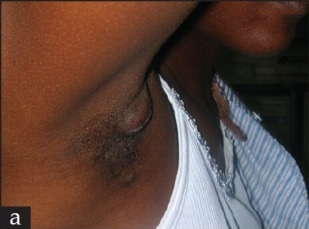
Ulcer from R. pulchellus bite

Immatures have been known to host on legs of humans. The tick has been described as having a "strong affinity for human being"; ulcers generally form where larvae and nymphs feed on humans, and adults have also been found feeding on humans.

== Disease transmission ==
Many pathogens harmful to humans and other animals can be transmitted by this tick. The Dugbe virus has been isolated from R. pulchellus collected from sheep in Ethiopia. There is also evidence that this tick can transmit Rickettsia conorii as guinea pigs tested positive for its antibodies after being fed on. One study suggested a possible link between this tick and typhus due to a similar distribution in Kenya, although transmission was unsuccessful in laboratory settings.

The Crimean–Congo hemorrhagic fever virus has been extracted from this tick. The West Nile virus has also been extracted from R. pulchellus.

It has also been shown to transmit Nairobi sheep disease, and is likely its main vector in northern Somalia. It is the main vector for the Kismayo virus. The piroplasm Theileria taurotragi has R. pulchellus as one of its main vectors.

== Predators ==
The red-billed oxpecker regularly eats this tick.

== Habitat and distribution ==
This tick inhabits the Afrotropical biogeographic realm. It has been reported in the Palearctic, namely in the Giza Governorate, Egypt, but some researchers are hesitant about listing the Palearctic in its distribution based on just that report.

Adult ticks looking for hosts inhabit scrub and long-grass areas.

It occurs in the Horn of Africa, particularly in the Rift Valley and eastward.

It lives between elevations of 500 and 2,000 m (1,600 and 6,600 ft) in semiarid bushlands and plains with an annual rainfall of 100–800 mm (3.9–31.5 in).

One study predicted that its habitat range will increase throughout 2100 due to climate change.

It is most active during the rainy season.

=== Population ===
It was the most common tick in one study conducted in Haller Park, Kenya. In the early 1900s, it was very common in Kenya's Athi Plains, and also found near Nairobi, Kiambu, and Ruiru, and is the predominant tick collected from grass in the Kilimani area of Nairobi in a 1935 study. One long-term study conducted in Laikipia, Kenya involved people walking for 400 m (1,300 ft) and counting the number of ticks found on their clothing; the average number of R. pulchellus adults peaked at three.

=== As introduced species ===
R. pulchellus has been reported as being found on animals such as giraffes, zebras, rhinoceroses, and others that were imported into the United States, but it does not seem to have become established anywhere in the Nearctic realm.
