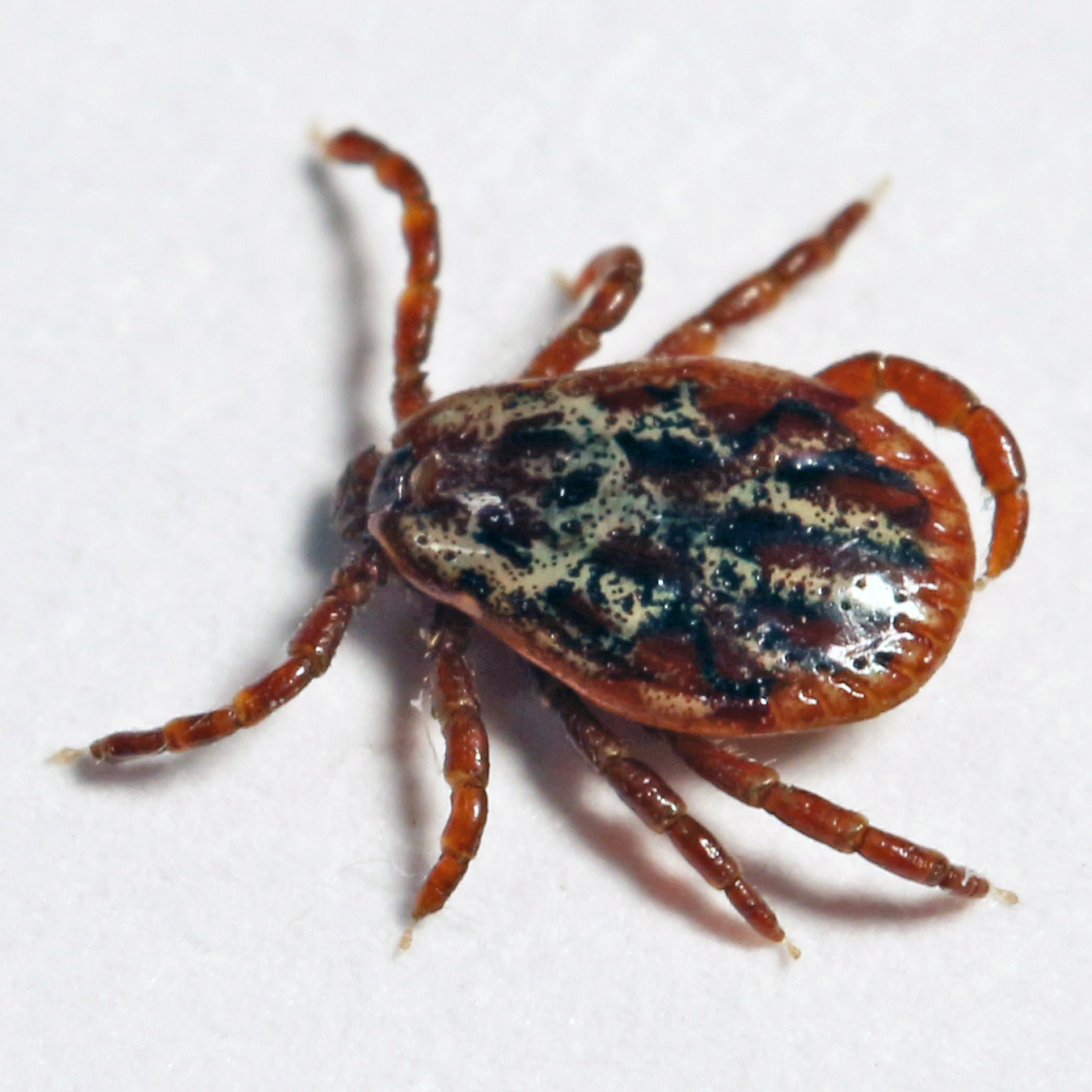

Scientific classification
- Kingdom: Animalia
- Phylum: Arthropoda
- Subphylum: Chelicerata
- Class: Arachnida
- Order: Ixodida
- Family: Ixodidae
- Genus: Dermacentor
- Species: D. reticulatus

Binomial name
- Dermacentor reticulatus Fabricius, 1794

Synonyms
- Acarus reticulatus Fabricius, 1794; Dermacentor pictus Hermann, 1804

= Dermacentor reticulatus =

Species of tick

Dermacentor reticulatus, also known as the ornate cow tick, ornate dog tick, meadow tick, and marsh tick, is a species of tick from the family Ixodidae. It is the type species for the genus Dermacentor. Dermacentor reticulatus is an ornate tick. The female varies in size from 3.8–4.2 mm (unfed) to 10 mm when engorged after feeding. The unfed male is 4.2–4.8 mm long. D. reticulatus is found in Europe and Western Asia, generally in wooded areas.

== Genomics ==
A chromosome-scale genome assembly of Dermacentor reticulatus was published in 2026. The genome is approximately 2.44 Gb in size and was assembled into 11 chromosomes. The assembly has a BUSCO completeness score of 97.9%, and 21,592 protein-coding genes were predicted.

== Lifecycle ==
Dermacentor reticulatus has a three-host development cycle. The adult female remains on a host for 9–15 days, and can lay 3000–4500 eggs, although the total number of eggs depends on the size of the female. The larva hatches from the egg in 14–21 days.

== Disease transmission ==
Dermacentor reticulatus is a vector of various disease organisms, including Babesia canis, Francisella tularensis, Coxiella burnetti, Theileria equi, and several Rickettsia species, such as Rickettsia slovaca.

== See also ==
- Ticks of domestic animals
