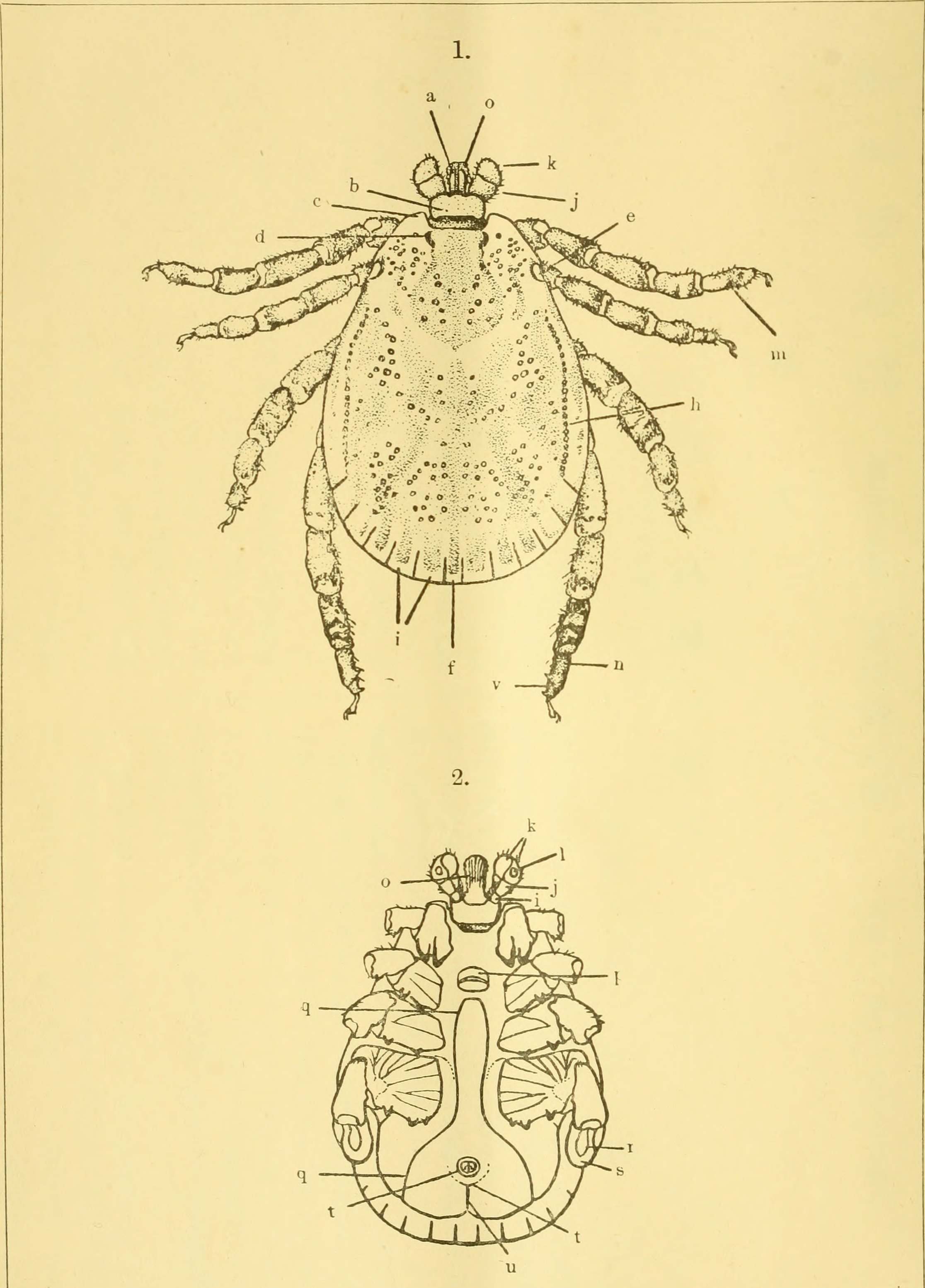
- Dermacentor auratus auratus

Scientific classification
- Domain: Eukaryota
- Kingdom: Animalia
- Phylum: Arthropoda
- Subphylum: Chelicerata
- Class: Arachnida
- Order: Ixodida
- Family: Ixodidae
- Genus: Dermacentor
- Species: D. auratus

Binomial name
- Dermacentor auratus Supino, 1897

Synonyms
- Dermacentor auratus auratus Neumann, 1911; Dermacentor (Indocentor) auratus Wassef & Hoogstraal, 1984; Dermacentor (Indocentor) auratus sumatranus Toumanoff, 1944; Indocentor auratus Schulze, 1933

= Dermacentor auratus =

Species of tick

Dermacentor auratus is a hard-bodied tick of the genus Dermacentor. It is found in India, Sri Lanka, Indonesia, and Vietnam. The length from capitulum to middle festoon is 7 mm and maximum breadth at its mid length is 5 mm. Adult has highly ornate scutum, capitulum, and legs. A pair of eyes was present at the level of second coxae. Brown base color markings on the dorsal scutum is the characteristic feature.

Adults are a potential vector for numerous strains of Anaplasma platys, Rickettsia, Hepatozoon species, and more recently for Lanjan virus. It is an ectoparasite of wild pigs, deer, humans, and possibly pythons.

The complete mitochondrial genome of Dermacentor auratus has been described in 2021. The circularised genome has a total length of 14,766 bp and contains 37 genes, including 13 protein-coding genes, 22 transfer RNA genes, 2 ribosomal RNA genes, 2 non-coding control regions and 3 "tick-boxes".
