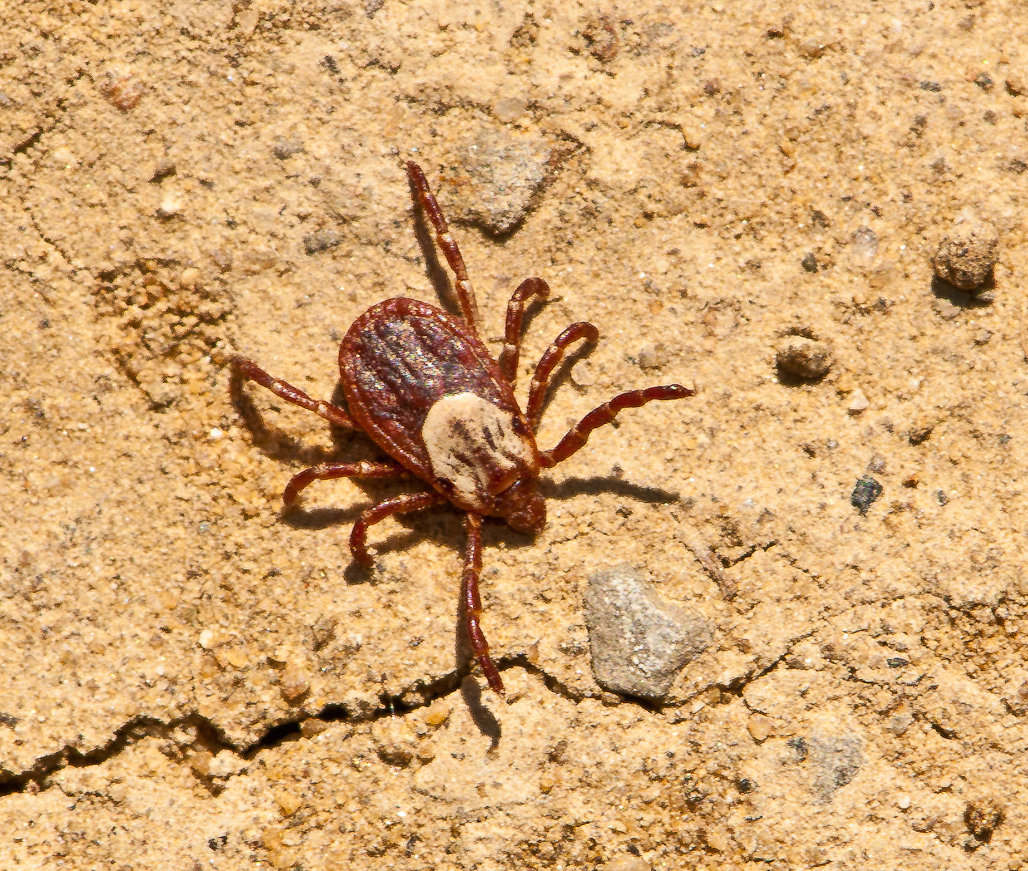
- Dermacentor occidentalis

Scientific classification
- Kingdom: Animalia
- Phylum: Arthropoda
- Subphylum: Chelicerata
- Class: Arachnida
- Order: Ixodida
- Family: Ixodidae
- Subfamily: Rhipicephalinae
- Genus: Dermacentor; C.L.Koch, 1844

Type species
- Dermacentor reticulatus (Fabricius, 1794)

Synonyms
- Amblyocentor Schulze, 1932; Anocentor Schulze, 1937

= Dermacentor =

Dermacentor Temporal range: Neogene–present

Genus of ticks

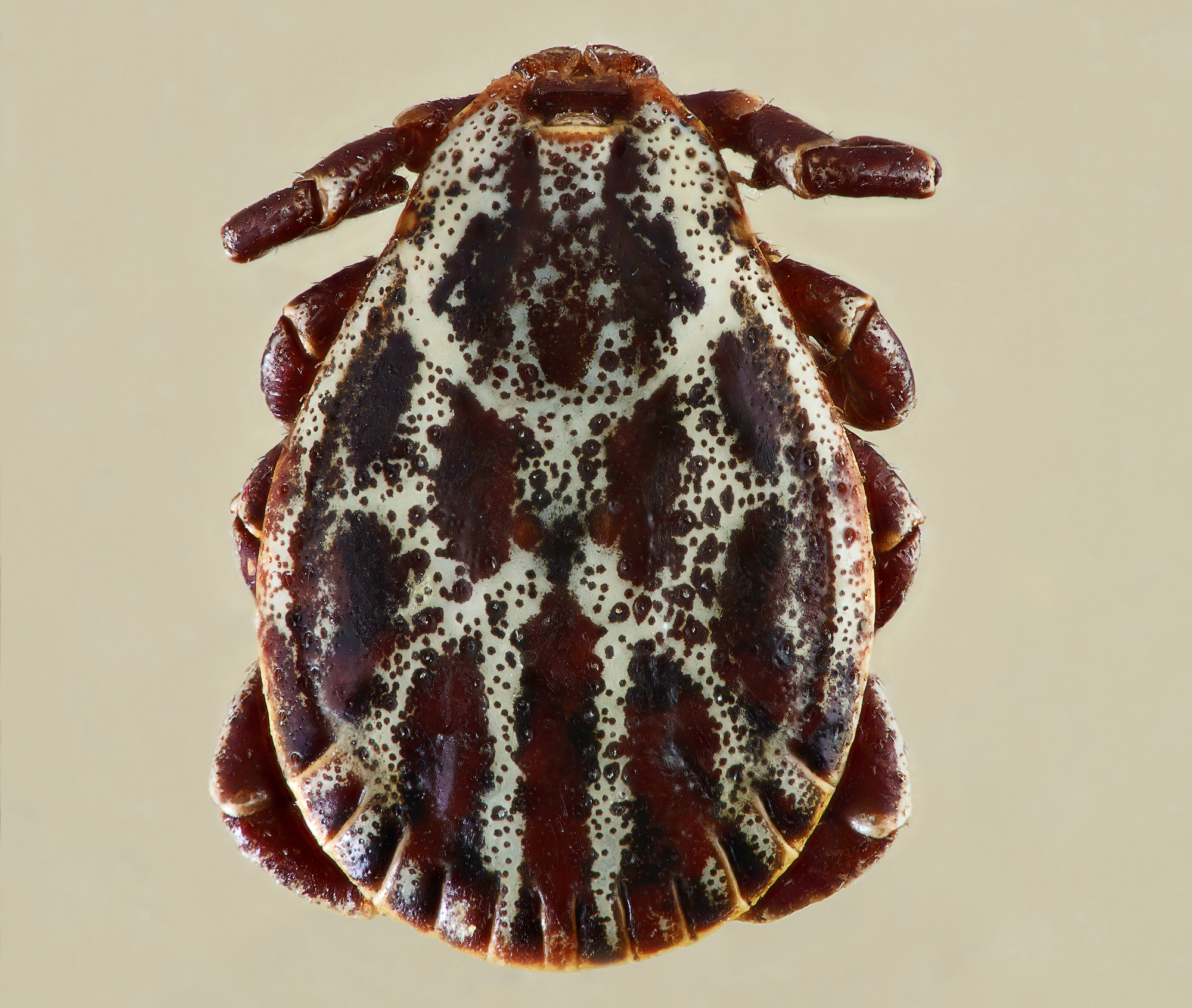
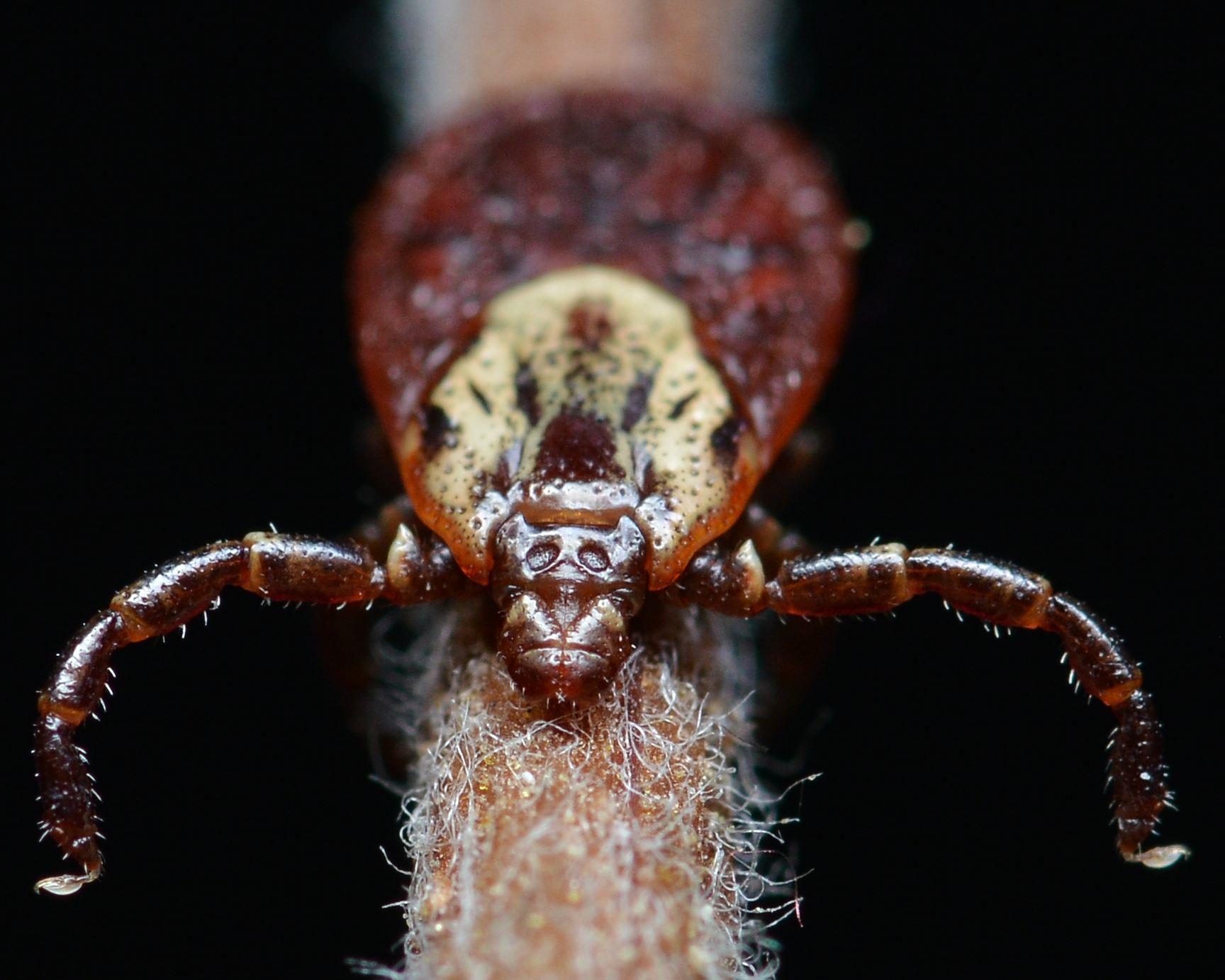
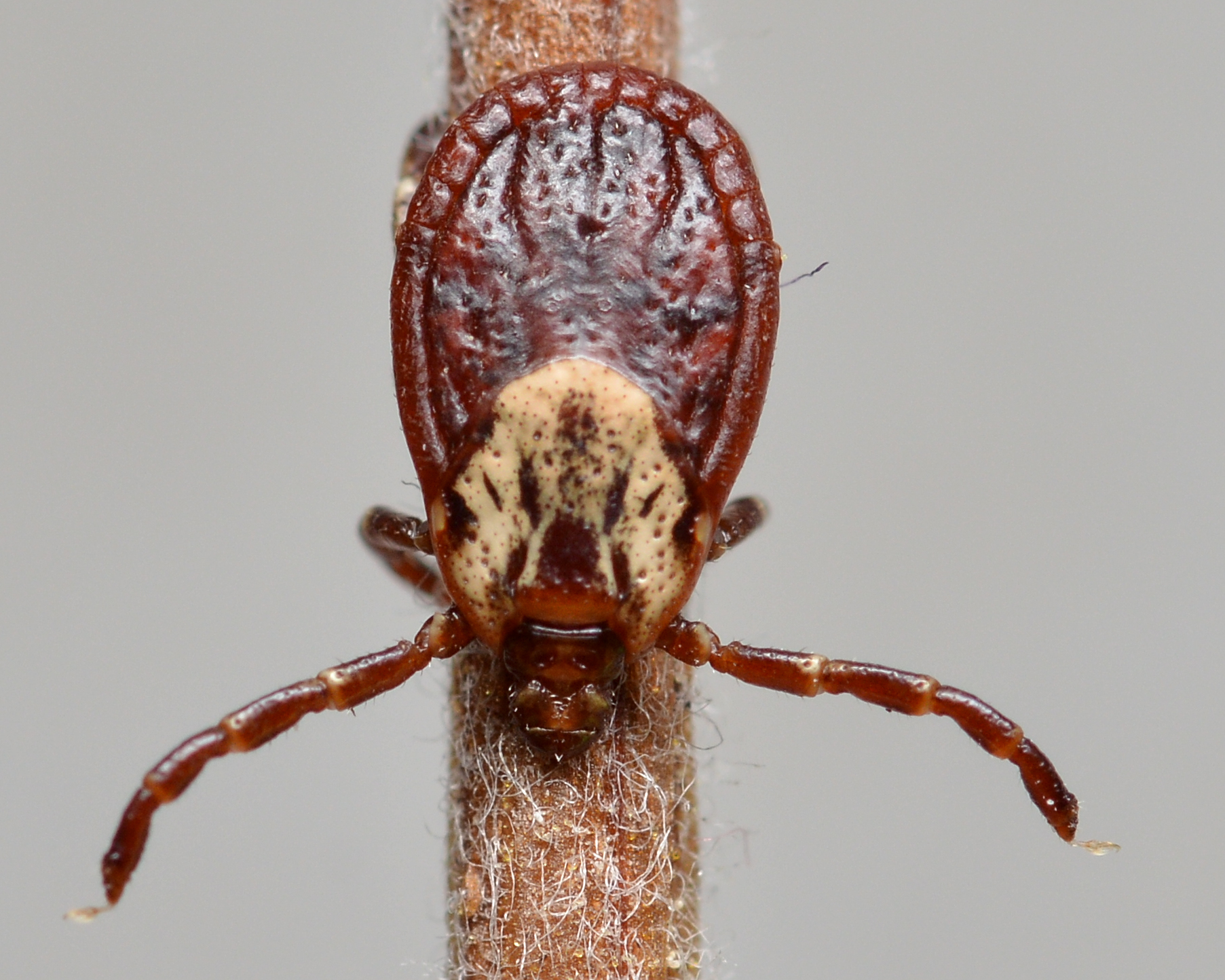
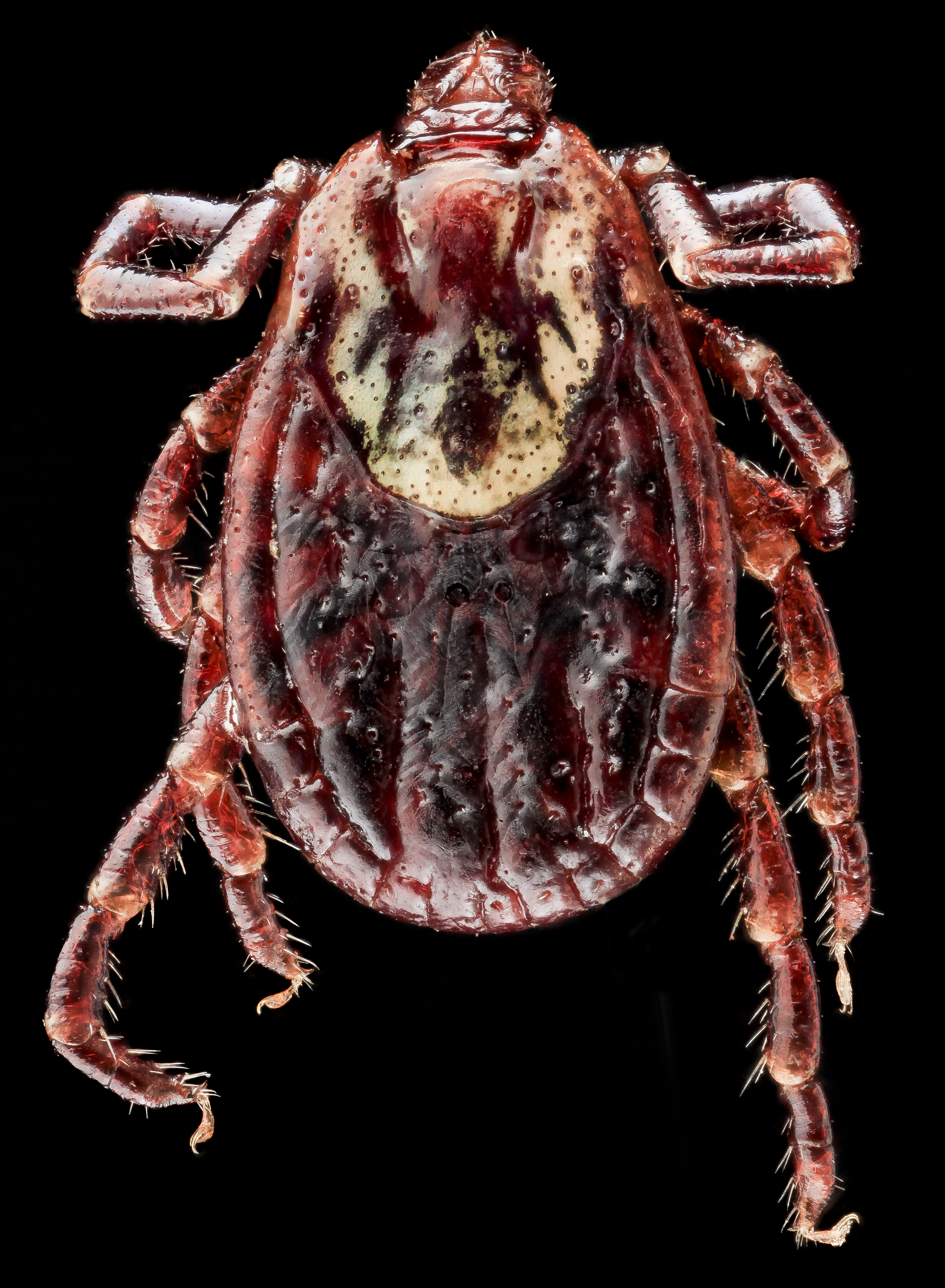
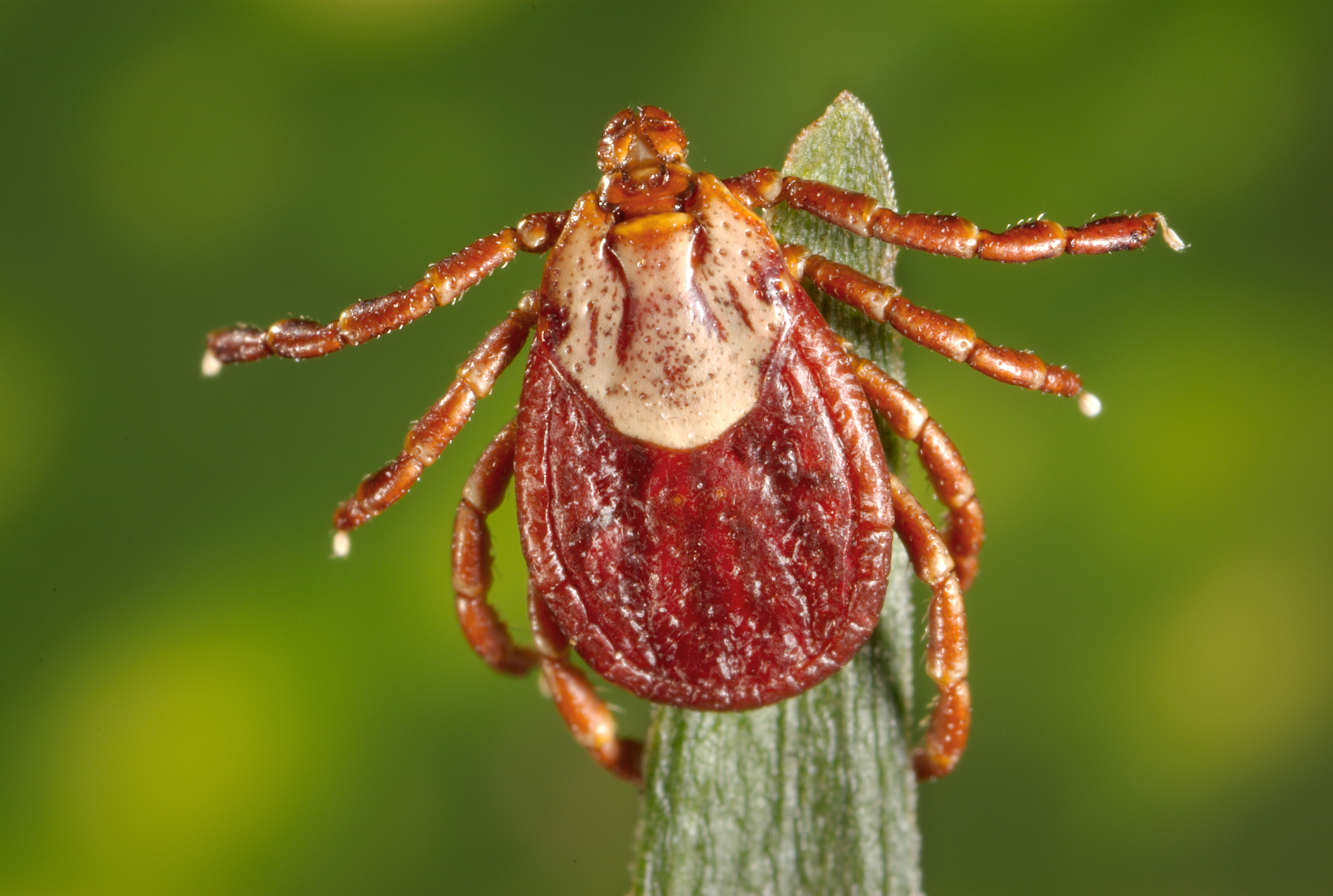
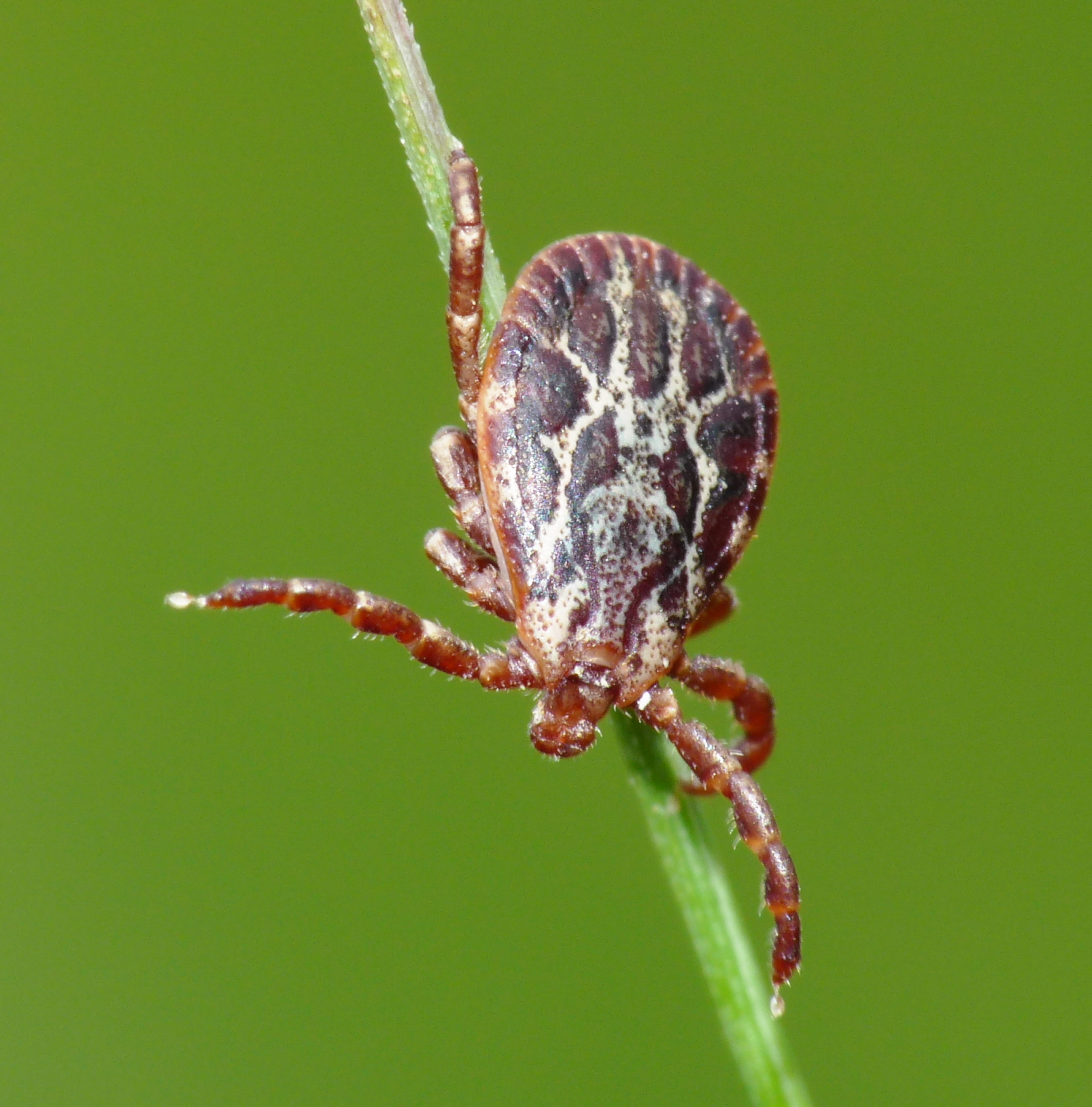
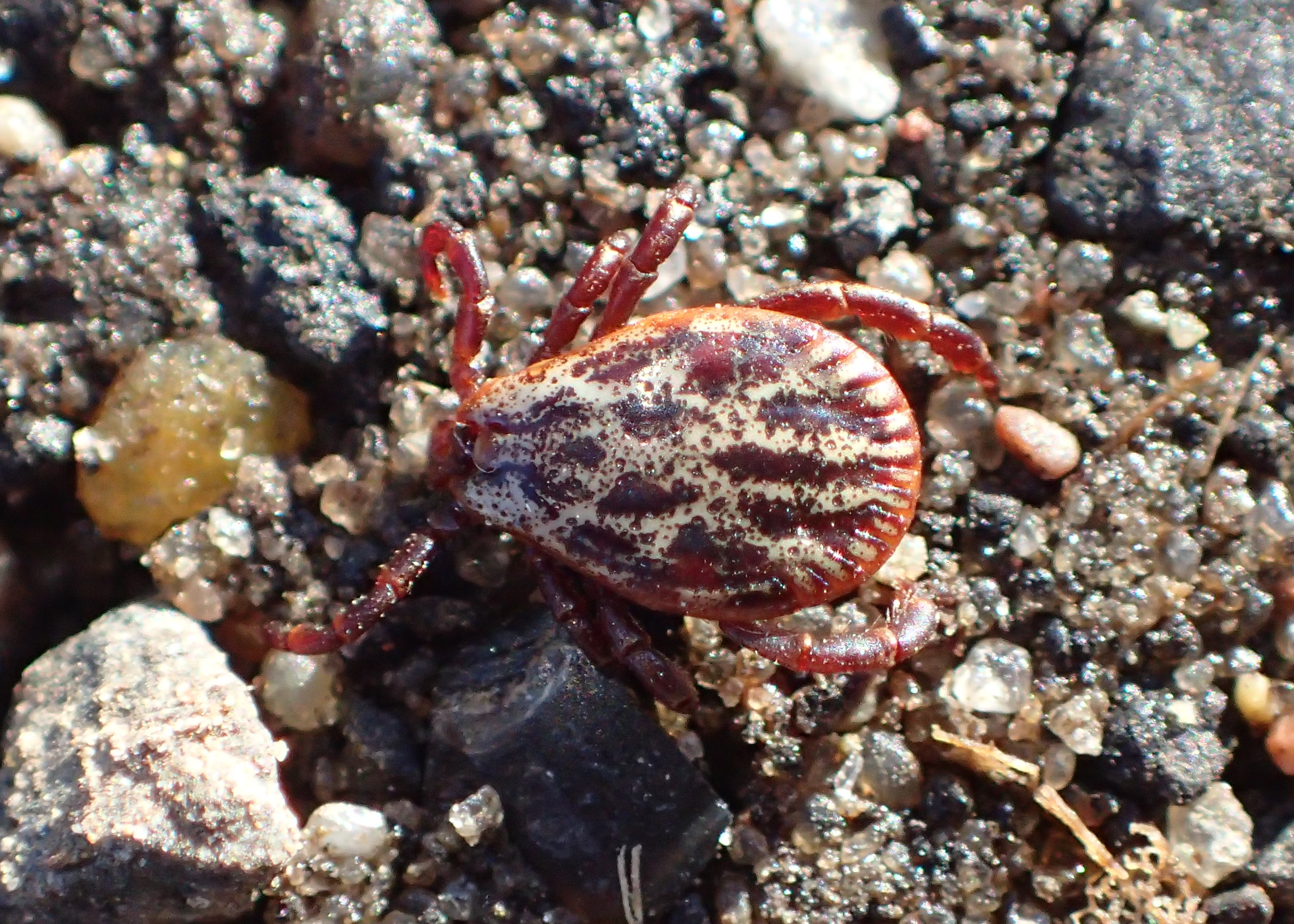
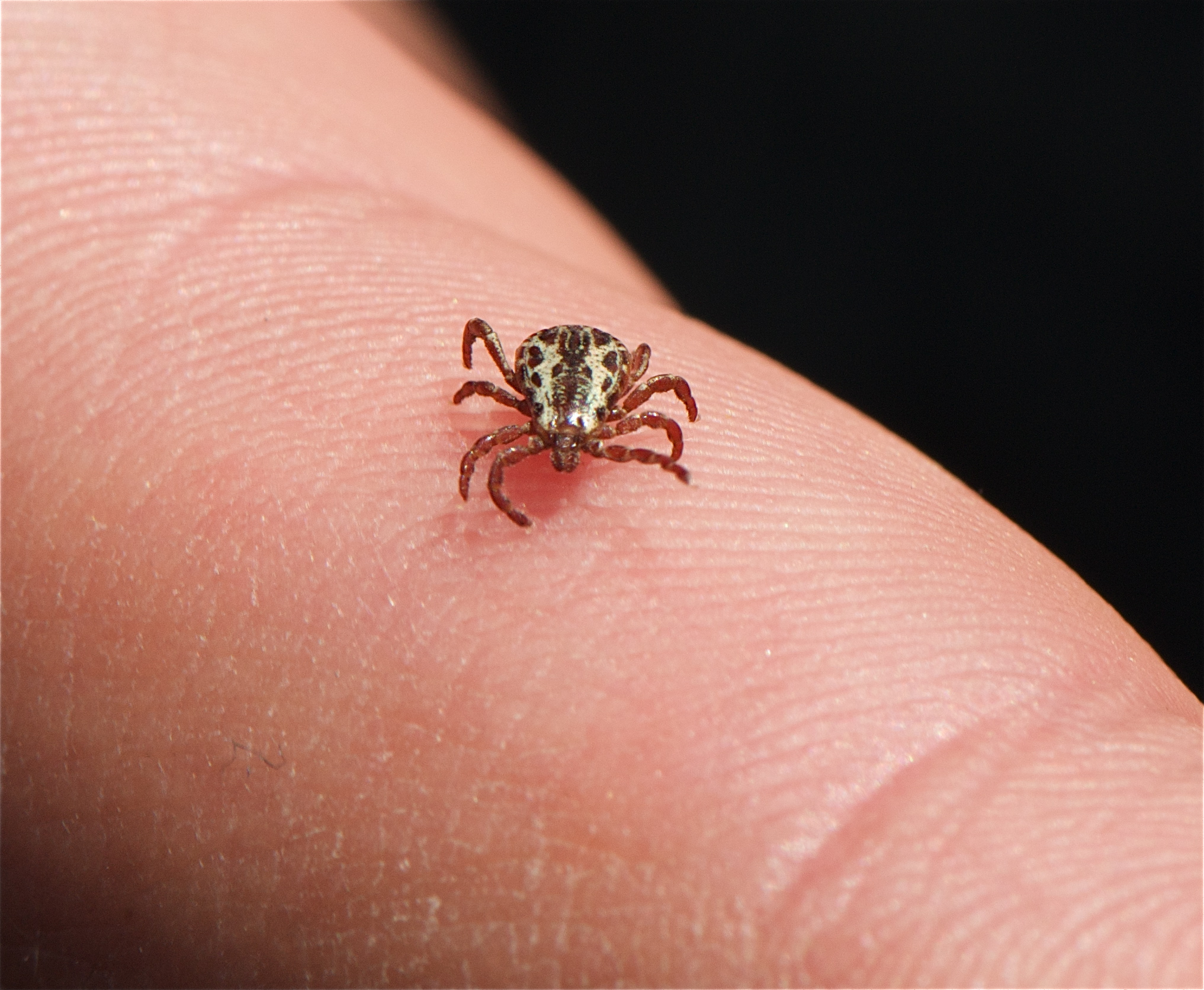
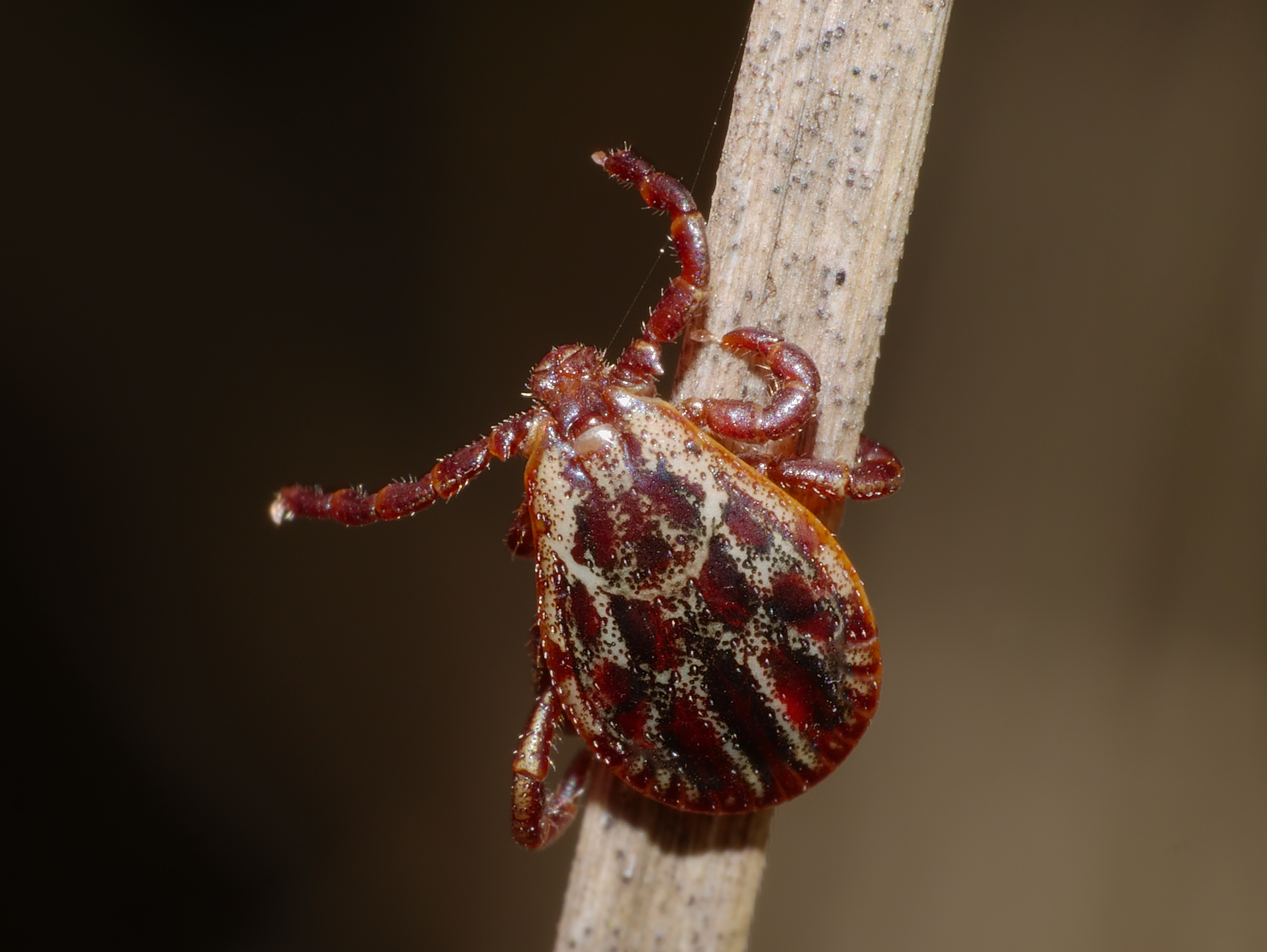
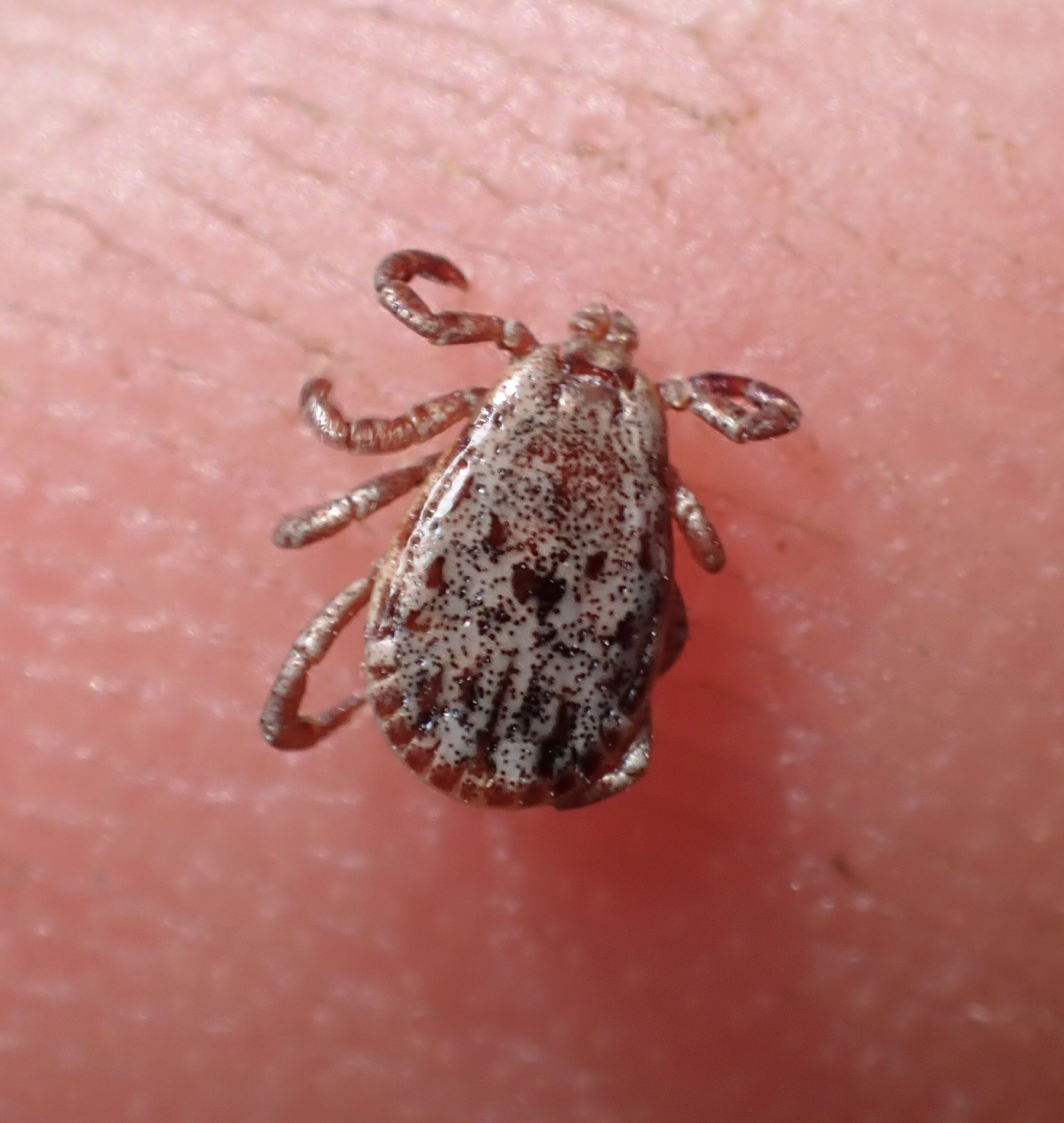
L>R, top down: Dermacentor marginatus, Dermacentor variabilis, Dermacentor variabilis, Dermacentor variabilis, Dermacentor andersoni, Dermacentor marginatus, Dermacentor reticulatus, Dermacentor variabilis, Dermacentor marginatus, Dermacentor variabilis, Dermacentor occidentalis

Dermacentor is a genus of ticks in the family Ixodidae, the hard ticks. The genus has a cosmopolitan distribution, with native species on all continents except Australia.

Hosts of Dermacentor ticks include many large and small mammals, including horses, deer, cattle, lagomorphs, peccaries, porcupines, tapirs, desert bighorn sheep, and humans. The American dog tick (D. variabilis) is a member of the genus.

Dermacentor species are vectors of many pathogens, including Rickettsia rickettsii, which causes the disease Rocky Mountain spotted fever, Coxiella burnetii, which causes Q fever, Anaplasma marginale, which causes anaplasmosis in cattle, Francisella tularensis, which causes tularemia, Babesia caballi, which causes equine piroplasmosis, and the Flavivirus that causes Powassan encephalitis. Dermacentor ticks inject a neurotoxin that causes tick paralysis.

== Species ==
As of 2025, 43 species are placed in the genus:

- Dermacentor albipictus Packard, 1869 – winter tick
- Dermacentor andersoni Stiles, 1908 – Rocky Mountain wood tick
- Dermacentor asper Arthur, 1960
- Dermacentor auratus Supino, 1897
- Dermacentor bellulus Schulze, 1933
- Dermacentor circumguttatus Neumann, 1897
- Dermacentor compactus Neumann, 1901
- Dermacentor confragus Schulze, 1933
- Dermacentor dispar Cooley, 1937
- Dermacentor dissimilis Cooley, 1947
- Dermacentor everestianus Hirst, 1926
- Dermacentor falsosteini Apanaskevich, Apanaskevich & Nooma, 2020
- Dermacentor filippovae Apanaskevich & Apanaskevich, 2015
- Dermacentor halli McIntosh, 1931
- Dermacentor hunteri Bishopp, 1912
- Dermacentor imitans Warburton 1933
- Dermacentor kamshadalus Neumann, 1908
- Dermacentor laothaiensis Apanaskevich et al., 2019
- Dermacentor latus Cooley, 1937
- Dermacentor limbooliati Apanaskevich & Apanaskevich, 2015
- Dermacentor marginatus Sulzer, 1776
- Dermacentor montanus Filippova & Panova, 1974
- Dermacentor nitens Neumann, 1897
- Dermacentor niveus Neumann 1897
- Dermacentor nuttalli Olenev, 1928
- Dermacentor occidentalis Marx, 1892 - Pacific Coast tick
- Dermacentor panamensis Apanaskevich & Bermúdez, 2013
- Dermacentor parumapertus Neumann, 1901
- Dermacentor pasteuri Apanaskevich et al., 2020
- Dermacentor pavlovskyi Olenev 1927
- Dermacentor pomerantzevi Serdyukova, 1951
- Dermacentor pseudocompactus Apanaskevich & Apanaskevich, 2016
- Dermacentor raskemensis Pomerantsev, 1946
- Dermacentor reticulatus Fabricius, 1794 – ornate cow tick, ornate dog tick, meadow tick, marsh tick
- Dermacentor rhinocerinus Denny, 1843
- Dermacentor silvarum Olenev 1931
- Dermacentor similis Lado, Glon, and Klompen, 2021
- Dermacentor sinicus Schulze, 1932
- Dermacentor steini Schulze, 1933
- Dermacentor taiwanensis Sugimoto, 1935
- Dermacentor tamokensis Apanaskevich & Apanaskevich, 2016
- Dermacentor tricuspis Schulze, 1933
- Dermacentor ushakovae Filippova & Panova 1987
- Dermacentor variabilis Say, 1821 – wood tick, American dog tick
