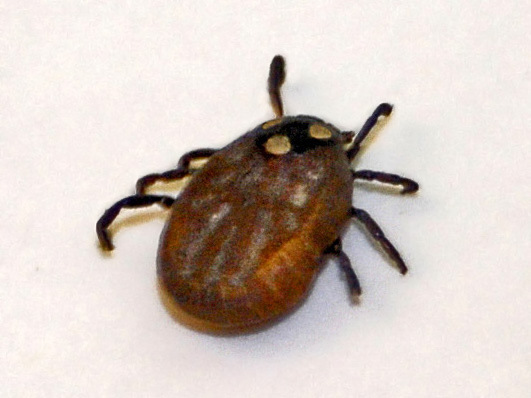
- Female of D. circumguttatus, museum specimen

Scientific classification
- Domain: Eukaryota
- Kingdom: Animalia
- Phylum: Arthropoda
- Subphylum: Chelicerata
- Class: Arachnida
- Order: Ixodida
- Family: Ixodidae
- Genus: Dermacentor
- Species: D. circumguttatus

Binomial name
- Dermacentor circumguttatus Neumann, 1897

= Dermacentor circumguttatus =

Species of tick

Dermacentor circumguttatus is a species of hard tick belonging to the family Ixodidae.

== Description ==
Dermacentor circumguttatus can reach a length of 3–5 mm (0.12–0.20 in). Ornamentation of males consists of eight pale spots near the periphery of the scutum. Festoons and central areas are inornate. In the females, the colour pattern is limited to three patches, one posteriorly and one anterolaterally on each side.

This African species has been found only on elephants and on the grey duiker (Sylvicapra grimmia). The main hosts of these hard ticks are the African bush elephant (Loxodonta africana) and the African forest elephant (Loxodonta cyclotis).
