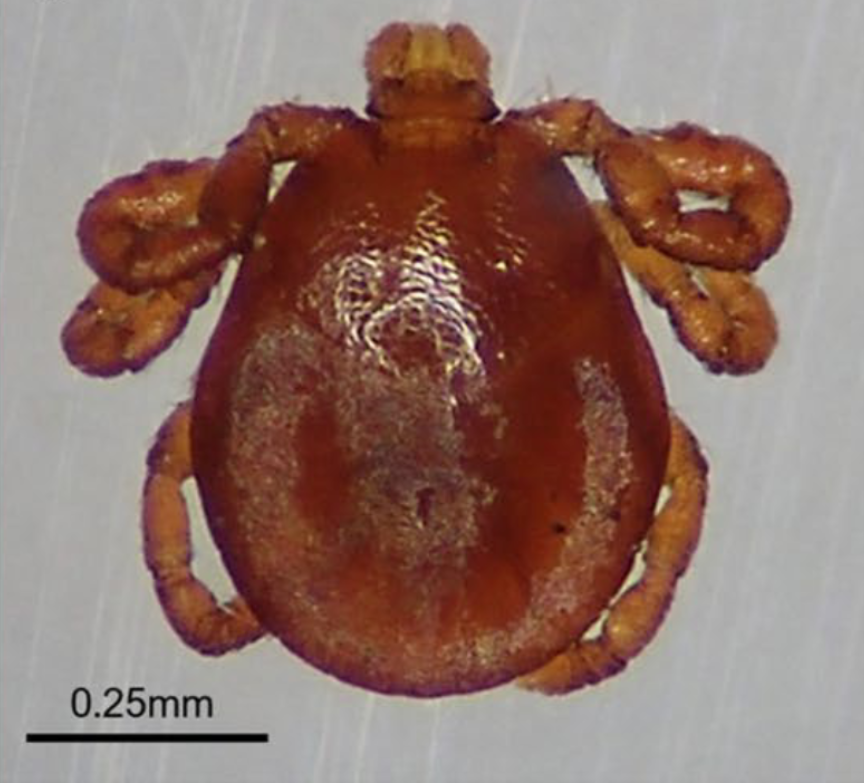
- Larva of winter tick

Conservation status
- Secure (NatureServe)

Scientific classification
- Kingdom: Animalia
- Phylum: Arthropoda
- Subphylum: Chelicerata
- Class: Arachnida
- Order: Ixodida
- Family: Ixodidae
- Genus: Dermacentor
- Species: D. albipictus

Binomial name
- Dermacentor albipictus (Packard, 1869)

= Dermacentor albipictus =

Species of tick

Dermacentor albipictus, the winter tick, is a species of hard tick that parasitizes many different mammal species in North America. It is commonly associated with cervid species such as elk (Cervus canadensis), white-tailed deer (Odocoileus virginianus), mule deer (O. hemionus) and caribou (Rangifer tarandus) but is primarily known as a serious pest of moose (Alces alces). As early as 1909, Ernest Thompson Seton described the winter tick as a greater enemy of the moose than were "wolves, bears, and cougars." Feral swine, another common host, is also home to many other tick species, which can help increase the population of winter tick and increase the distribution of the population in some areas, harming moose and ecosystems further. The ticks do not have a preference of host but moose are the most affected because of the areas they traverse through and their struggle to get them off. White-tailed deer are significantly better at getting rid of the pests.

The tick can be found all across North America, and has a large geographic distribution. While it can be found in several different habitats, it is often located in areas with a presence of moose. The tick prefers vegetation up to 1.25 m in height, for ease of finding a host.

Some evidence indicates that increasing populations of the winter tick may be responsible for a steep decline in the eastern moose population throughout the southern half of their range. In recent years, heavy infestations up to 150,000 ticks have been seen on single moose, which can lead to the death of the animal.

== Description ==
The winter tick is sexually dimorphic, with adult females larger than the males. The adult female is mostly reddish-brown, but with a white dorsal shield behind the head. The smaller adult male is dark brown with some white markings.

Female ticks become unusually large toward the end of winter, measuring up to 15 mm (0.6 in).

== Lifecycle ==
The lifecycle of D. albipictus lasts for about a year, and it is a single-host tick. This means that most of their life cycle is spent on a single host. Reproduction is done at the end of the lifecycle when the female tick is fully engorged, it falls off the host in late winter to early spring into the leaf litter and lays its eggs in mass of up to 3,000. The eggs hatch in late summer or early spring. After lying dormant for some time, they start to ascend vegetation to group in clusters of about 1,000 on plants up to 1.25 m in height. This allows them to latch onto animals that pass by and begin to feed on their hosts. While on a host, the larvae go through the nymphal stage and then finally metamorphose into adults. The male ticks live their entire nymph to adult lives on the single host, never falling off to reproduce like the female; they die on the host.

Larvae became nymphs about 10 days after being applied to the moose. Nymphs then undergo a long diapause before becoming adults in roughly mid-February. One moose, which had been infected with larvae 37 days after the others, still showed a similar timing of adult ticks appearing. The diapause may serve to delay maturity until the onset of warmer weather, as has been seen in other species of ticks.

During late winter, the ticks mate, and blood-filled females drop off the host to lay their eggs and die. For captive moose observed in Ontario in 1988, tick detachment occurred in late March to early April.

== Effect on ecosystems ==
Tick populations and their effects on moose have been observed to vary from year to year. Winters that are shorter and warmer have been shown to correlate with increased numbers of ticks in moose populations. In a study conducted by Vermont Fish and Wildlife Department between 2017 and 2019, they captured 36 adult cows and 90 calves and concluded that 74% of all mortalities were in relation to winter tick infestation, with 91% of those deaths being calves.

The tick not only directly affects mammals, but also has adverse indirect effects on ecosystems, and other wildlife that can be connected with the moose. In 2001, the moose abundance on Isle Royale was around 1200, but due to the ticks, the moose population fell to around 400 in 2007. The long-term average of years of data show that moose on Isle Royale show about 51% hair loss from excessive grooming in reaction to the infestation of the winter tick. With the decreased moose population, the main food source of the moose--various shrubs species and balsam fir--has had an increase in abundance.

Winter tick also affects most other ungulates, including elk, caribou, and white-tailed deer, also causing anaemia, hair loss, and reduced fitness. Winter ticks do not have a preference for a specific mammalian host; they grab onto any animal that passes by in the larval stage. They affect moose the most aggressively because the moose struggle to detach them the most; therefore, the ticks have a higher chance of survival on the host and can cluster in larger masses. Luckily, winter ticks do not transmit diseases to moose, humans, or pets.
