= Rhipicephalus turanicus =

Scientific classification
- Kingdom: Animalia
- Phylum: Arthropoda
- Subphylum: Chelicerata
- Class: Arachnida
- Order: Ixodida
- Family: Ixodidae
- Genus: Rhipicephalus
- Species: R. turanicus

Binomial name
- Rhipicephalus turanicus Pomerantzev, 1936

Synonyms
- Rhipicephalus gpe sanguineus Yeruham et al., 1996; Rhipicephalus (Rhipicephalus) turanicus Morel, 1969; Rhipicephalus turanicus Uzakov, 1964; Rhipicephalus secundus Feldman-Muhsam, 1952

Species of hard tick

Rhipicephalus turanicus is a hard tick commonly found in the Palearctic and Afrotropics.
