= Dermacentor similis =

Scientific classification
- Domain: Eukaryota
- Kingdom: Animalia
- Phylum: Arthropoda
- Subphylum: Chelicerata
- Class: Arachnida
- Order: Ixodida
- Family: Ixodidae
- Genus: Dermacentor
- Species: D. similis

Binomial name
- Dermacentor similis Lado, Glon, and Klompen, 2021

Species of tick

Dermacentor similis is the Western United States tick species corresponding to Dermacentor variabilis in the Eastern United States.

Using an integrative taxonomy framework, analyses comprising mitochondrial and nuclear molecular markers and morphology of specimens collected from central-eastern and western United States yielded strong evidence that D. variabilis corresponds to two species, Dermacentor variabilis in the east and Dermacentor similis n. sp. in the west.

Since Dermacentor variabilis is a three-host tick and the transmitter of several pathogens, it is crucial to delineate Dermacentor similis' host range and vector competency to establish what pathogens it may transmit.
