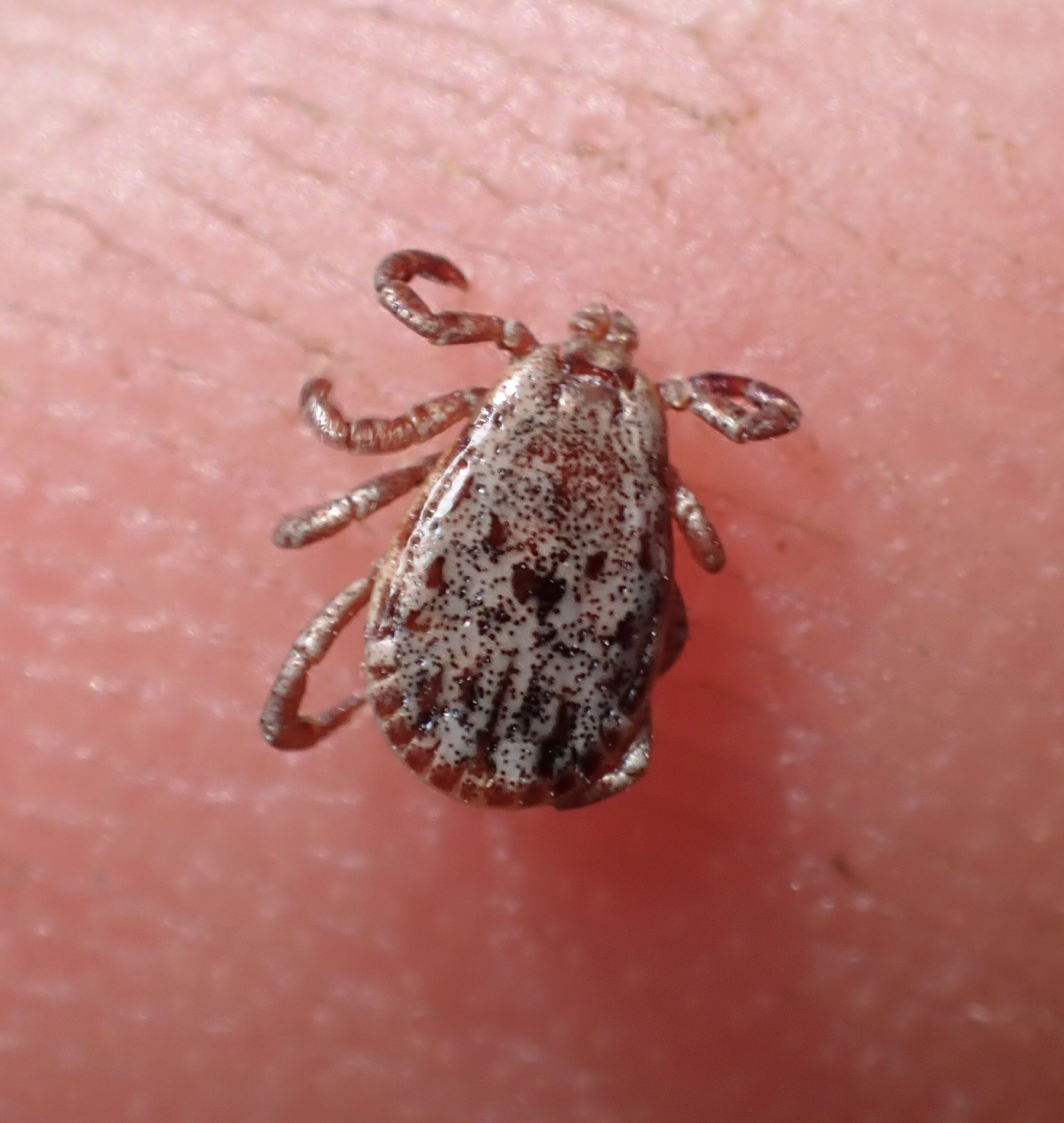

Scientific classification
- Domain: Eukaryota
- Kingdom: Animalia
- Phylum: Arthropoda
- Subphylum: Chelicerata
- Class: Arachnida
- Order: Ixodida
- Family: Ixodidae
- Genus: Dermacentor
- Species: D. occidentalis

Binomial name
- Dermacentor occidentalis Marx, 1892

= Dermacentor occidentalis =

Species of wood tick

Dermacentor occidentalis, also known as the Pacific coast tick, is a species of wood tick in the arthropod family Ixodidae. This species is part of the coastal California biome. Host species include humans. When not engorged with blood, they measure about 4.5 millimeters long. The exoskeleton is a silvery-gray color.
