= Boris Ivanovich Pomerantsev =

Russian acarologist (1903–1939)

Boris Ivanovich Pomerantsev (3 March 1903 - 22 June 1939) was a Russian acarologist and specialist on the ixodid ticks.

Pomerantsev was born in St. Petersburg and grew up in Saratov. He worked many jobs after his school and the death of his father in 1917. He joined the state university of Saratov in 1920 to study hydrotechnology but the department was closed in 1924 and he moved to Leningrad to study Ixodid ticks in the Novgorod region that spread a piroplasma of cattle. He graduated in 1929 and then worked in the All-Union Institute of Plant Protection in the Department of Crop Pests. In 1934 he joined the USSR Academy of Sciences in the Department of Parasitology. He described numerous ticks from the USSR in a monograph and worked on tick-borne encephalitis in Siberia around 1939 and while researching it he was himself infected and died from encephalitis, unable to complete his PhD thesis. Several of his works were published posthumously. Ixodes pomeranzevi and Dermacentor pomerantzevi have been named in his honour.
