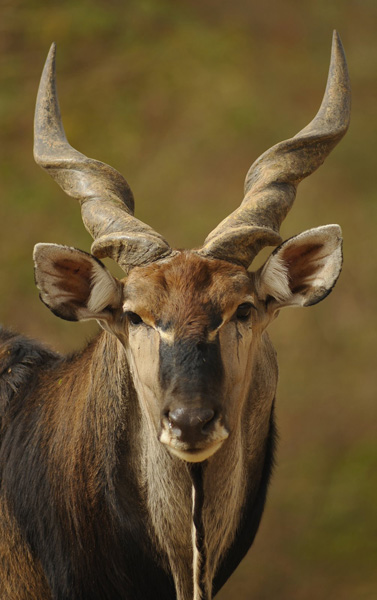
- Giant eland showing the characteristic spiral-horns seen in this group of bovines.

Scientific classification
- Kingdom: Animalia
- Phylum: Chordata
- Class: Mammalia
- Order: Artiodactyla
- Family: Bovidae
- Subfamily: Bovinae
- Tribe: Tragelaphini; Blyth, 1863 sensu Sokolov, 1953

Type species
- Antilope sylvatica Pallas, 1766

Genera
- See text: †Pheraios Kostopoulo & Koufos, 2006; †Pontoceros Vereshchagin et al., 1971; Taurotragus Wagner, 1855; Tragelaphus Blainville, 1816

Synonyms
- List: Strepsiceriae Gray, 1846; Strepsicerotini Gray, 1846 sensu Simpson, 1945; Tragelaphinae Blyth, 1863; Taurotragidae Knottnerus-Meyer, 1907; Taurotragini Knottnerus-Meyer, 1907 sensu Leakey, 1965

= Tragelaphini =

Tragelaphini Temporal range: Middle Miocene – present, 15–0 Ma

Tribe of antelopes

The tribe Tragelaphini (referred to by some authors as "Strepsicerotini"), or the spiral-horned antelopes, are bovines that are endemic to sub-Saharan Africa. These include the bushbucks, kudus, and the elands. The scientific name is in reference to the mythical creature the tragelaph, a Chimera with the body of a stag and the head of a goat. They are medium-to-large, tall, long-legged antelopes characterized by their twisted horns and striking pelage coloration patterns (most common is the distinctive white, vertical barring).

Despite being among the largest species of antelope, they are actually more closely related to cattle (Bos taurus), and together along with a few apparent Asiatic species belong to the subfamily Bovinae. While the group's evolutionary history occurred in Africa, there have been fossil species that have been found in Eurasia (which may also be the place of origin for this group). The number of genera and species is debated as some consider there to be one or two genera with nine species, while others consider there to be five genera and 25 species. In general, spiral-horned antelopes can be roughly divided into two groups: robust forms (which only consists of the two eland species, Taurotragus) and gracile forms (the rest of them, in the genus Tragelaphus, although this taxon is an unnatural grouping, and might warrant additional genera).

Spiral-horned antelopes are browsers, found in a wide variety of environments both arid and humid, including semi-deserts, savannas, rainforests and mountains. In all these environments, however, they prefer to live in dense bush or thicket, which offer concealment from their natural predators. Considered among the most beautiful and charismatic bovids, the various species of spiral-horned antelopes are popular in zoos and game reserves. The two eland species have been ranched as alternatives to cattle, being hardy in extreme environments, relatively placid in character, and nutritionally superior as a meat source.

== Etymology ==
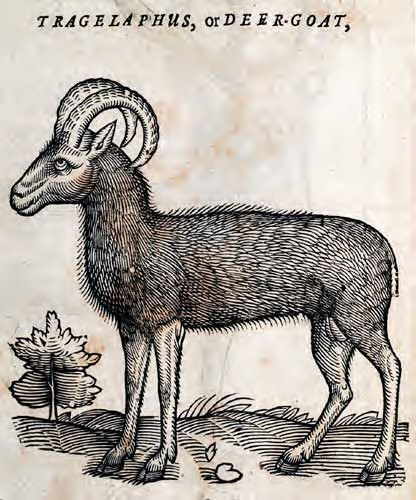
This is a woodcut is of the tragelaph from the book, The History of Four-footed Beasts and Serpents by Edward Topsell.

The tribe name "Tragelaphini" was published as a subfamily ("Tragelaphinae") by British zoologist Edward Blyth in 1863, and was downgraded to tribe by Russian zoologist Vladimir Sokolov in 1953. It refers to the mythical tragelaph which was imagined to be half-goat, half-stag. The root words come from Greek, with τράγος (trágos) meaning "male goat" and έλαφος (élaphos) meaning "stag". The suffix "–ini" refers to their ranking as a tribe.

The alternative name "Strepsicerotini" was published by another British zoologist John Edward Gray as "Strepsiceriae" earlier in 1846. It comes from Greek with στρεπτός (streptós) meaning "twisted" and κέρατος (kératos) meaning "horn", referring to the shape of this group's horns. However, "Strepsiceriae" had the incorrect prefix and suffix, which this was corrected to "Strepsicerotini" in 1945 by American paleontologist George Gaylord Simpson. While the name "Strepsicerotini" was published first, most scientists used the latter name "Tragelaphini" as it is more widely used.

== Systematics ==
=== Placement within Bovinae ===
- - Bovinae
    - Boselaphini (four-horned antelope and nilgai)
    - - Tragelaphini (spiral-horned antelopes)
      - Bovini (saola, buffalos, bison, and wild cattle)

Phylogenetic relationships of the Bovinae (Bibi et al., 2013)

The spiral-horned antelopes belong to the subfamily Bovinae which also includes oxen of the tribe Bovini and two aberrant species of Asian antelope, the four-horned antelope and the nilgai which belong to the tribe Boselaphini. The relationship between the tribes varies in research concerning their phylogeny. Most molecular research supports a Bovini and Tragelaphini subclade of Bovinae. There are also some morphological support for oxen being the closet living relatives to the spiral-horned antelopes, most notably both groups have horn cores with a pedicle (the attachment point to the skull).

There has been a few studies which have supported alternate arrangements, one being a sister relationship between the nilgai (Boselaphus tragocamelus) and the spiral-horned antelopes. Historically, the nilgai was classified as a tragelaphine by some scientists. Benirschke et al. (1980) worked on karyotypes with the lesser kudu and found them to share with the nilgai an X chromosome fused with autosome 14. Another study that analyzed the COII gene found the nilgai and lesser kudu being sister species (although the support was low and had limited species sampling). The majority of other molecular and morphological work do not support the placement of the nilgai in Tragelaphini, as it contradicts with their data and results.

=== The fossil record ===
Tragelaphini has diverged from their closet sister taxon for the last 15 to 18 million years. It was once thought that spiral-horned antelopes were uniquely African, but there have been Eurasian fossils found in Greece and the Caucasus. Kostopoulos and Koufos (2006) have described Pheraios chryssomallos from fossils found in the Turolian locality of Thessaly, Greece. The authors have found cladistic support of P. chryssomallos being the basal most tragelaphin (or at least a sister taxon to the group) based on 46 cranial features. This suggests that the ancestor of all known species of spiral-horned antelope must have originated in Europe during the late Miocene. The eastern European genus Pontoceros is another example, although this animal has been found in early Pleistocene beds of the Mygdonia basin. This suggests that spiral-horned antelopes have emigrated from Africa and into Eurasia during a latter period in their evolutionary history. In addition, undescribed fossils found in South Asia could be related to spiral-horned antelopes.

Fossils from Africa have been recovered in places such as Olduvai Gorge in Tanzania, but they are sometimes consist of fragmented pieces of leg bone and horn. The oldest known of these species is Tragelaphus moroitu which has been found in the late Miocene to early Pliocene deposits of the Asa Koma, Kuseralee and the Middle Awash deposits in the horn of Africa. Similar in appearance to the nyala (Tragelaphus angasii), T. moroitu was a small antelope and has primitive characteristics in the horn core, making it the most primitive known species of spiral-horn antelope in Africa. The evolution of spiral-horned antelopes based on the abundance of fossils shows they were among the most common species of antelope in Africa, and as climatic changes have occurred throughout their evolution, they have undergone faunal turnovers and adapting to new environments.

Below is the list of fossil species that have been described so far listed in alphabetical order:

- Tribe Tragelaphini Blyth, 1863 sensu Sokolov, 1953
  - Genus †Pheraios Kostopoulo & Koufos, 2006
    - †Pheraios chryssomallos Kostopoulo & Koufos, 2006
  - Genus †Pontoceros Vereshchagin et al., 1971
    - †Pontoceros surprine Vekua, 2012
    - †Pontoceros ambiguus Vereshchagin et al., 1971
  - Genus †Spirocerus Boule & Chardin, 1928
    - †Spirocerus kiakhtensis Boule & Chardin, 1928
  - Genus Taurotragus Wagner, 1855
    - †Taurotragus arkelli Leakey, 1965
    - †Taurotragus maroccanus Arambourg, 1939
  - Genus Tragelaphus de Blainville, 1816
    - †Tragelaphus algericus Geraads, 1981
    - †Tragelaphus gaudryi Thomas 1884
    - †Tragelaphus kyaloae Harris, 1991
    - †Tragelaphus lockwoodi Reed & Bibi, 2011
    - †Tragelaphus moroitu Haile-Selassie et al., 2009
    - †Tragelaphus nakuae Arambourg, 1941
    - †Tragelaphus nkondoensis Geraads & Thomas, 1994
    - †Tragelaphus pricei Wells & Cooke, 1956
    - †Tragelaphus rastafari Bibi, 2011
    - †Tragelaphus saraitu Geraads et al., 2009

=== Taxonomy ===
- - - - - - - - Giant eland
              - Common eland
            - - Greater kudu
              - - Mountain nyala
                - - - - Bongo
                      - Sitatunga
                    - Bushbuck
    - Nyala
  - Lesser kudu

Phylogenetic relationships from combined analysis of all molecular data (Willows-Munro et al., 2005)

Traditionally the tribe was divided into two genera and seven species as shown below:

- Tribe Tragelaphini Blyth, 1863
  - Genus Taurotragus Wagner, 1855 – elands
    - Taurotragus derbianus (Gray, 1847) – giant eland
    - Taurotragus oryx (Pallas, 1767) – common eland
  - Genus Tragelaphus de Blainville, 1816
    - Tragelaphus imberbis (Blyth, 1869) – lesser kudu
    - Tragelaphus angasii Angas, 1849 – nyala
    - Tragelaphus strepsiceros (Pallas, 1766) – greater kudu
    - Tragelaphus sylvaticus (Sparrman, 1780) - cape bushbuck
    - Tragelaphus scriptus (Pallas, 1766) – harnessed bushbuck
    - Tragelaphus buxtoni (Lydekker, 1910) – mountain nyala
    - Tragelaphus euryceros (Ogilby, 1837) – bongo
    - Tragelaphus spekii Speke, 1863 – sitatunga

However recent molecular studies have shown a different arrangement. According to the molecular work on the nuclear DNA and mitochondrial DNA, the lesser kudu and the nyala are the basal most living species. Then around 10 million years ago there was a split between forest-dwelling, gracile species and larger, open-plains species. This renders Tragelaphus paraphyletic in respect to Taurotragus, which either means to make the latter genus into a junior synonym of the former genus or split Tragelaphus into several genera to maintain Taurotragus. In a 2011 large scale taxonomic reorganisation of ungulates by Groves and Grubb, they recognised new cryptic species, and split the traditional species into several geographical species. This was based on morphological comparisons between the species (in particular the dimensions of the skull elements and skin colouration) and defined species based on phylogenetic species concept. Groves and Grubb (2011) furthermore establish of several new genera in light of Tragelaphus being paraphyletic. They have a slight different arrangement of the species in Tragelaphus sensu stricto than suggested by genetics. Other scientists have mixed reactions to this proposal, with some preferring the traditional number of species to be seven and others preferring the new taxonomy from Groves and Grubb (2011).

Below is the alternative taxonomy based on Groves and Grubb (2011), with species and subspecies names following Castelló (2016) from Bovids of the World:

- Tribe Tragelaphini Blyth, 1863 sensu Sokolov, 1953 – spiral-horned antelopes
  - Genus Ammelaphus Heller, 1912 – lesser kudus
    - Ammelaphus imberbis (Blyth, 1869) – northern lesser kudu
    - Ammelaphus australis Heller, 1913 – southern lesser kudu
  - Genus Nyala Heller, 1912
    - Nyala angasii (Angas, 1849) – lowland nyala
  - Genus Taurotragus Wagner, 1855 – elands
    - Taurotragus derbianus (Gray, 1847) – giant eland
      - Taurotragus derbianus gigas Heuglin, 1863 – eastern giant eland
      - Taurotragus derbianus derbianus (Gray, 1847) – western giant eland
    - Taurotragus oryx (Pallas, 1767) – common eland
      - Taurotragus oryx ivingstonii Sclater, 1864 – Livingstone's eland
      - Taurotragus oryx pattersonianus Lydekker, 1906 – East African eland
      - Taurotragus oryx oryx (Pallas, 1767) – Cape eland
  - Genus Strepsiceros Hamilton Smith, 1827 – greater kudus
    - Strepsiceros strepsiceros (Pallas, 1766) – Cape greater kudu
    - Strepsiceros zambesiensis (Lorenz, 1894) – Zambezi greater kudu
    - Strepsiceros chora (Cretzschmar, 1826) – northern greater kudu
    - Strepsiceros cottoni (Dollman & Burlace, 1928) – western greater kudu
  - Genus Tragelaphus de Blainville, 1816
    - Tragelaphus scriptus (Pallas, 1766) – western bushbuck
      - Tragelaphus phaleratus (Hamilton Smith, 1827) – central bushbuck
      - Tragelaphus bor Heuglin, 1877 – Nile bushbuck
      - Tragelaphus decula (Rüppell, 1835) – Abyssinian bushbuck
      - Tragelaphus meneliki Neumann, 1902 – Menelik's bushbuck
      - Tragelaphus fasciatus Pocock, 1900 – eastern coastal bushbuck
      - Tragelaphus ornatus Pocock, 1900 – Chobe bushbuck
      - Tragelaphus sylvaticus (Sparrman, 1780) – Cape bushbuck
    - Tragelaphus buxtoni (Lydekker, 1910) – mountain nyala
    - Tragelaphus euryceros (Ogilby, 1837) – bongo
      - Tragelaphus euryceros isaaci (Thomas, 1902) – mountain bongo
      - Tragelaphus euryceros euryceros (Ogilby, 1837) – lowland bongo
    - Tragelaphus spekii group Speke, 1863 – sitatungas
      - Tragelaphus spekii Speke, 1863 – East African sitatunga
      - Tragelaphus sylvestris (Meinertzhagen, 1916) – Nkosi Island sitatunga
      - Tragelaphus larkenii (St. Leger, 1931) – Nile sitatunga
      - Tragelaphus ugallae Matschie, 1913 – Tanzanian sitatunga
      - Tragelaphus gratus Sclater, 1880 – western sitatunga
      - Tragelaphus selousi Rothschild, 1898 – Zambezi sitatunga

== Natural history ==
=== General description ===
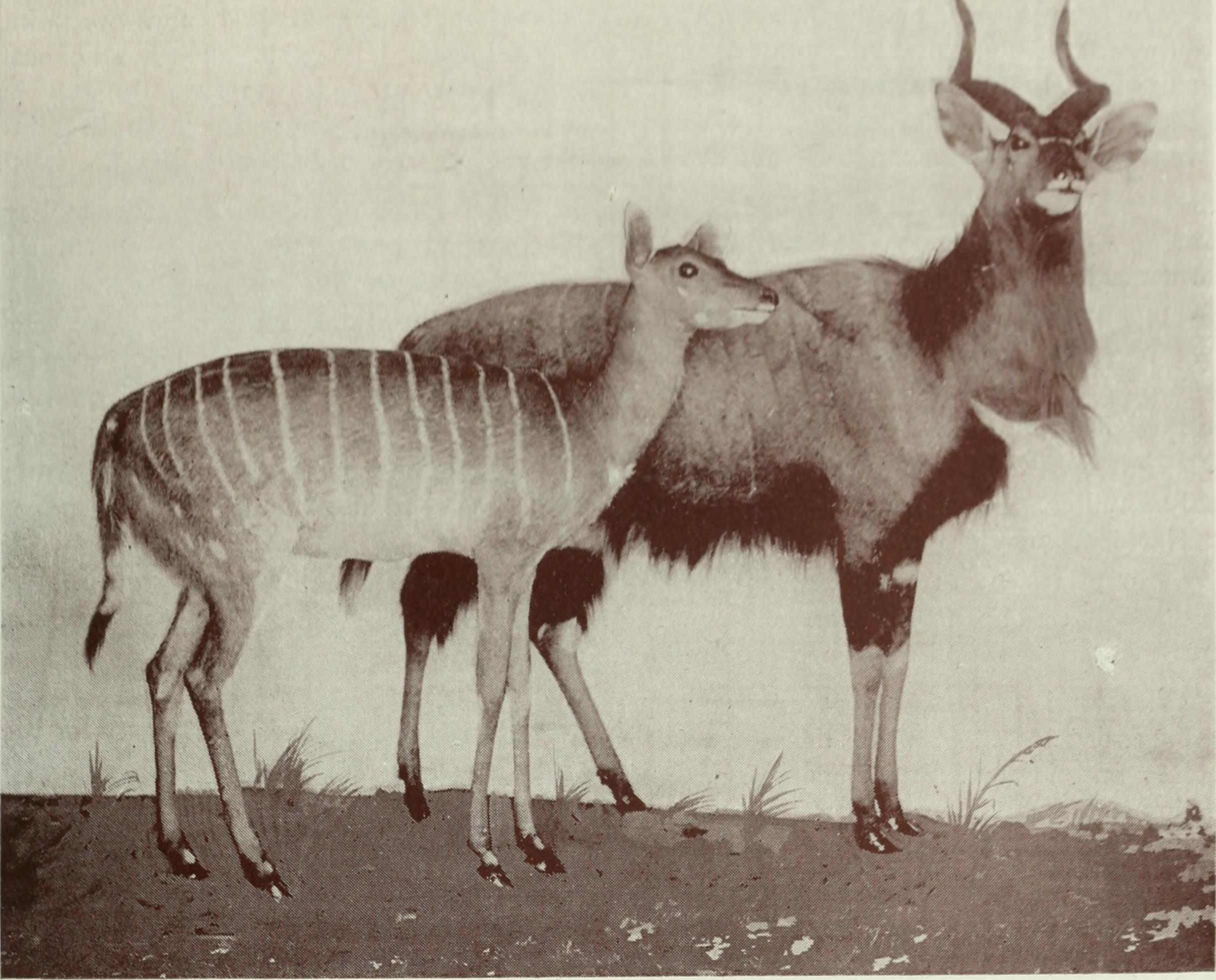
Taxiderm mounts of nyala showing the general characteristics seen in this group.

The spiral-horned antelopes are medium to large antelopes and generally are tall and long-legged. Horns are present in the males of all species, while females lack them with the exception of bongos and elands. The horns primarily role is used for defensive horn-wrestling which are common during territorial disputes, as well has for horn soiling and sexual display. Other examples of extreme sexual dimorphism can be seen among spiral-horned antelopes. Males are much larger in size than the females, and both sexes have very contrasting pelage coloration. The coloration in females is generally tan to red-brown. Males area a darker hue of the female coloration, which they darken as the animal gets older. Regardless of the coloration of the sexes, most species of spiral-horned antelopes have disruptive coloration that is a distinctive white vertical barring (striped pattern). A spotting pattern can occur as well. Both patterns are individually and geographically variable. These patterns help them to conceal themselves in the dense vegetation from predators. Most species have a white chevron between the eyes, spotted cheeks, the throat having a white patch and the upper-forelegs with dark garters. All except the nyala and the greater kudu have a chest crescent. In addition there are also physical attributes that serve a purpose in social communication such as dorsal crests, white scuts and white tips on the horns. These features help express the animal's emotions as well as alerting members of the herd from predators. Underneath the hair fringe in the hind feet are special glands that encircles the false hooves.

=== Distribution and ecology ===
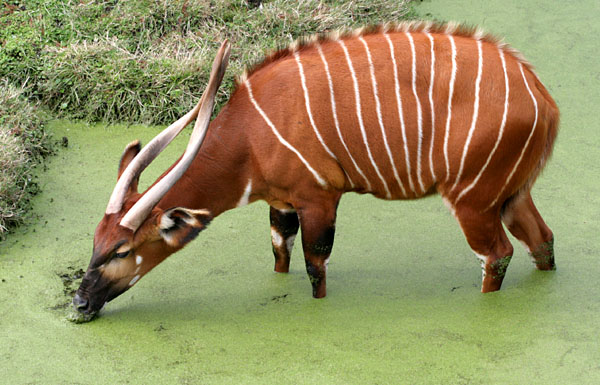
A bongo drinks from a swamp.

All species are found in a majority of sub-Saharan Africa in various woodland habitats such as rainforests, swamps, open savannahs, mountains, and sub-deserts. With the exception of the eland and sitatunga, spiral-horned antelopes are all browsers. All species forage on green foliage as well as rely on them for cover. During the dry seasons their diet consists mostly foliage from bushes and trees, shoots, twigs and herbs. They also supplement fruit, flowers, and fresh grass when the rainy season arrives. In response to living in dense cover, spiral-horned antelopes are able to move through the thickett by bounding, rushing, and dodging through the vegetation. Most species are water dependent though kudus and elands do not rely on it as they live in more arid environments. Unlike most species of bovids, spiral-horned antelopes are primarily nocturnal though some species can be seen in the early morning and late afternoon. As with all species of antelope, spiral-horned antelopes (especially the young, the old and the weak) are susceptible to some of Africa's major predators, such as lions, leopards, cheetahs, spotted hyenas, and African wild dogs.

=== Behavior and reproduction ===
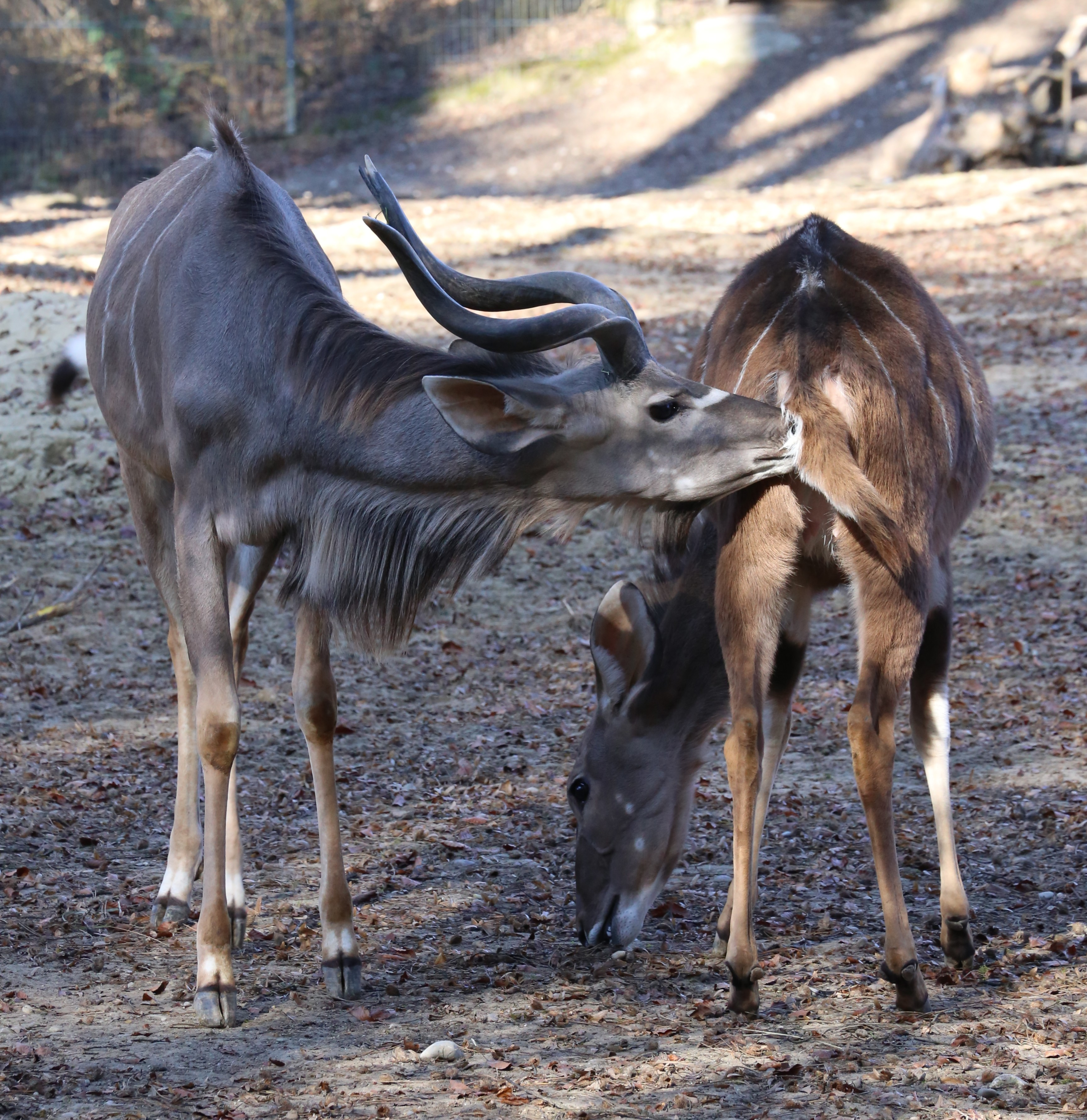
A male greater kudu expecting a female in estrus

When alert to the presence of danger, the necks of these bovines are raised as high as possible. They move in a "goatlike" gait, as they move their neck in a pecking motion (moving the head backwards and forwards). As they spot the predator they immediately stop. The ultimate antipredator strategy is concealment in dense, tall bush, enough for the animal to perfectly camouflage in the vegetation. Sometimes they would raise one leg. If that fails they would sprint away in abrupt flight. They are not known to have high stamina for running, although they are known to jump incredibly high.

Given the various species of spiral-horned antelope the social organization varies between. The extreme ends of the spectrum are the predominately solitary bushbuck and at the other end the highly social giant eland. In general the herd size of spiral-horned antelopes are not large as they rarely exceed more than a few dozen individuals, and are mostly sedentary in nature. The herd composition is unisexual which is mostly females and their young. It is currently believed to be the reason why some spiral-horned antelopes practicing herd as a defense mechanism to protect the young from predators. In the bongo and eland species this led to the development of larger sizes in the females and horns, along with intense social hierarchical ranking (which is not seen in other species which it is only the larger males that dominate over the smaller females). With the exception of the mother and her calf there are no strong social bonds in the herd. These herds are sometimes very open and loosely defined as sometimes females come and go. Males born in the herd will remain in the herd until they developed their primary and secondary sexual characteristics. Once they have developed these traits males leave the herd and become nomads.

It is only during the breeding season males congregate around a female in estrus for a few hours. All spiral-horned antelope species are polyandrous. Aggression is very low among individuals of both sexes though intraspecific competition does occur. In females often they neck-fight as well poke and snap at each other. Males would use their horns for wrestling where they try to attack the face. Sometimes there is even intimation from the males to persuade the female into submission as often she would try and retaliate. The gestation period occurs once the female has been inseminated from the male successfully. In most species it lasts approximately seven months, although in the larger species this extends to eight or nine months. They only give birth to a single calf. Once the young are born, they will not wean until they are around five to six months of age. Females sexually mature by two to three years while for males it is four to five years.

=== Genetics and hybridization ===
The chromosome number of various species varies. This correlates nicely with the evolutionary relationships among the spiral-horned antelopes. The ancestral Y chromosome was subacrocentric but a pericentric inversion occurred making it submetacentric after the separation of the lesser kudu and nyala. Ancient hybridization also played a key part in the evolution of the chromosomes in all species. Below is a listing of the diploid number 2n as follows (male/female):

- Nyala: 2n = 55/56
- Lesser kudu: 2n = 38/38
- Common eland: 2n = 31/32
- Greater kudu: 2n = 31/32
- Bushbuck: 2n = 33/34
- Sitatunga: 2n = 30/30
- Bongo: 2n = 33/34

Hybridization between bongos and sitatunga produce fertile offspring known as "bongsis" and are well documented. These hybrid animals have a diploid number 2n = 33 and all known cases produced female animals, which had developed horns like female bongos while their stripping pattern was intermediate between bongos and sitatungas with an overall orange coloring. The hybridization of these species adds further support in the bongo and sitatunga being each other's closet relatives. Other hybrids have been documented, such as a male common eland x greater kudu resulting from an accidental crossing from the San Diego Zoo Safari Park in the 1970s. Notable mixed inherited traits were pointed ears as the eland's, but a bit widened like kudu's. The tail was half the length of that of an eland, with a terminal tuft of hair as in kudu. The individual was, however, azoospermic as analysis showed that it completely lacked germ cells, which produce gametes.

== Relationships with humans ==
=== Conservation ===
Spiral-horned antelopes as a whole are not an endangered group of mammals. Most species are recognized by the IUCN Red List as "least concern", with only the giant eland and mountain nyala being classified as vulnerable and endangered respectively. In addition some local populations and subspecies of the other species have been declining. The main threats to the survival of spiral-horned antelope is habitat destruction and being hunted for bush meat, although most species live in habitat unsuitable for agriculture. In fact in some cases some species might be expanding their numbers (although the accurate population estimates in some species is unknown).

=== Domestication ===
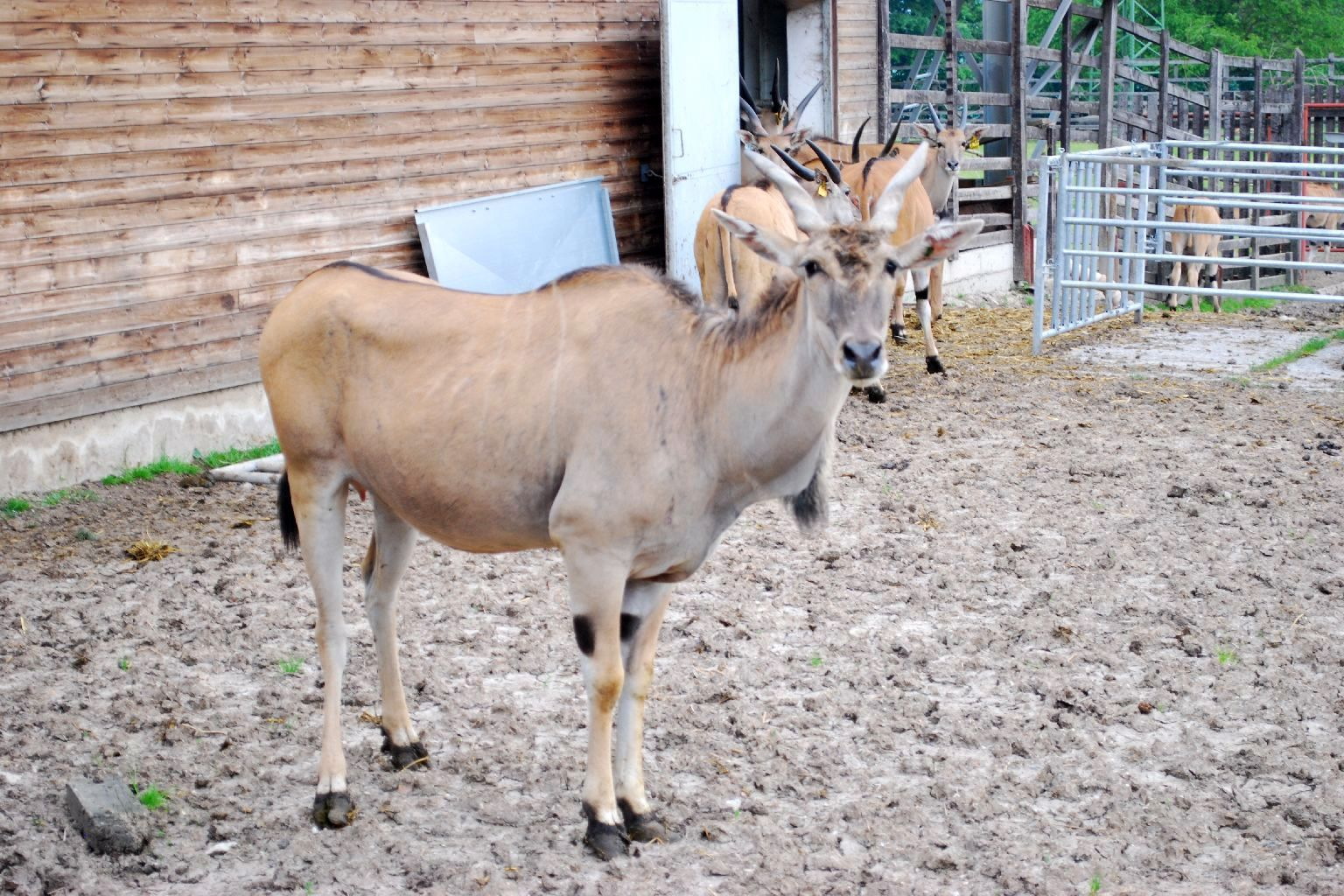
Several common elands on a farm.

The two eland species are now semi-domesticated as their docile dispositions, large quantities of meat, and resilience in Africa's harsh environments has made them ideal alternatives to cattle in some parts in Africa. In a 2014 comparison between the quality of meat from common elands and cattle, it was found that the meat from male elands was low-fat and more beneficial for human nutritional health but it lacks the sensory texture and flavor that makes cattle meat so appealing to consumers. In addition to being on farm as exotic livestock, elands as well as the other species of spiral-horned antelope have also been brought to private game reserves across the planet (in particular parts in North America and Africa) for recreational hunting. Unlike eland however, most of the other species are not as docile or tolerant of humans as they avoid any contact as possible.

== See also ==
- Tragelaph
- Antelope
- Cryptic species
- Species complex
