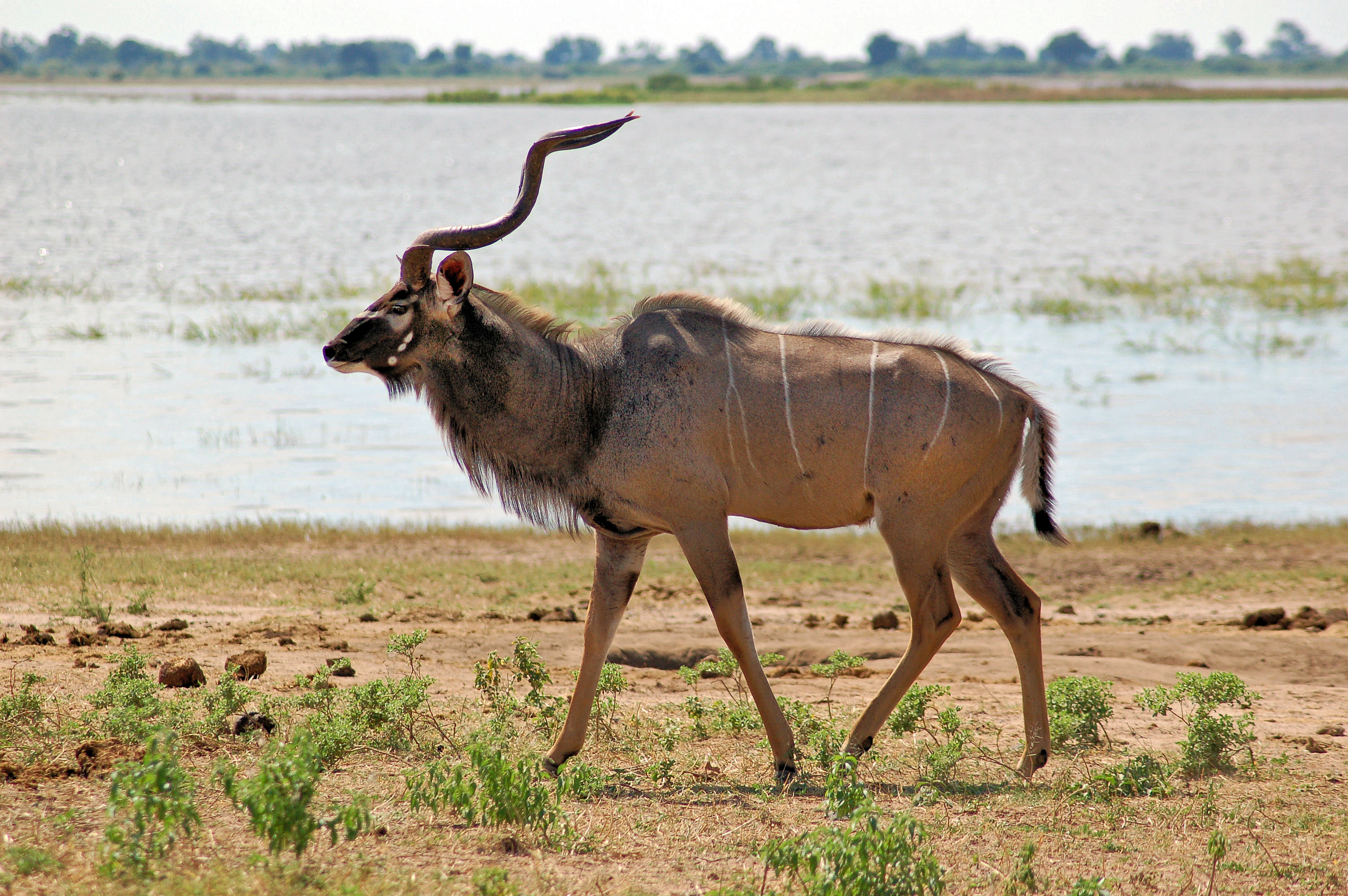
- An adult male greater kudu by the Chobe River, Botswana

Scientific classification
- Kingdom: Animalia
- Phylum: Chordata
- Class: Mammalia
- Order: Artiodactyla
- Family: Bovidae
- Subfamily: Bovinae
- Tribe: Tragelaphini
- Genus: Tragelaphus (Blainville, 1816)

Type species
- Antilope sylvatica (= Antilope scripta) Sparrman, 1780

Species
- See cladogram

= Tragelaphus =

Genus of mammals

Tragelaphus is a genus of medium-to-large-sized spiral-horned antelopes. It contains several species of bovines, all of which are relatively antelope-like. Species in this genus tend to be large in size and lightly built, and have long necks and considerable sexual dimorphism. The name "Tragelaphus" comes from the mythical tragelaph.

== Taxonomy and phylogeny ==
- - - - - - - Taurotragus
              - Giant eland
              - Common eland
            - - Strepsiceros
                Greater kudu
              - Tragelaphus
                - Mountain nyala
                - - - - Bongo
                      - Sitatunga
                    - - - - Cape bushbuck
                          - Harnessed bushbuck
          - Nyala
            Lowland nyala
        - Ammelaphus
          Lesser kudu

Phylogenetic relationships of the mountain nyala from combined analysis of all molecular data (Willows-Munro et.al. 2005). Subgenera (stem labels) per MDD.

Tragelaphus /trəˈdʒɛləfəs/ is a genus in the tribe Tragelaphini and the family Bovidae. The genus authority is French zoologist Henri Marie Ducrotay de Blainville, who first mentioned it in the journal Bulletin des Sciences, par la Société Philomatique in 1816. The name is not of modern scientific invention, but comes from ancient Greek τραγέλαφος (tragélaphos), from τράγος (trágos), meaning a "male goat", and ἔλαφος (élaphos), meaning a "deer".

While traditionally the genus Taurotragus has been used for the two species of elands, this creates a paraphyly. As such, Taurotragus has been demoted to a subgenus. Similarly, the nyala, the lesser kudu, and the greater kudu each have their own monospecific subgenera, respectively Nyala, Ammelaphus, and Strepsiceros. Genus Boocercus formerly contained T. eurycerus.

== Extant species ==
The following 10 species are assigned to this genus:

| Male | Female | Common name | Subgenus | Scientific name | Distribution |
|---|---|---|---|---|---|
| | | Lesser kudu | Ammelaphus | T. imberbis | Ethiopia, Kenya, Somalia, South Sudan, Tanzania, and Uganda |
| | | Lowland nyala or Nyala | Nyala | T. angasii | Eswatini, Malawi, Mozambique, South Africa, Zambia, and Zimbabwe. |
| | | Greater kudu | Strepsiceros | T. strepsiceros | eastern and southern Africa |
| | | Giant eland | Taurotragus | T. derbianus | Senegal to Mali (western subspecies) and Cameroon to South Sudan (western subspecies) |
| | | Common eland | Taurotragus | T. oryx | Angola, Botswana, the Democratic Republic of the Congo, Eswatini, Ethiopia, Kenya, Lesotho, Malawi, Mozambique, Namibia, Rwanda, South Africa, South Sudan, Tanzania, Uganda, Zambia, and Zimbabwe |
| | | Bongo | Tragelaphus | T. eurycerus | Kenya, Central and western Africa |
| | | Cape bushbuck | Tragelaphus | T. sylvaticus | Cape in South Africa to Angola and Zambia and up the eastern part of Africa to Ethiopia and Somalia. |
| | | Harnessed bushbuck | Tragelaphus | T. scriptus | distributed from Senegal and southern Mauritania across the Sahel, east to Ethiopia, and south to Angola and the southern Democratic Republic of the Congo. |
| | | Mountain nyala | Tragelaphus | T. buxtoni | central Ethiopia. |
| | | Sitatunga | Tragelaphus | T. spekii | Democratic Republic of the Congo, the Republic of the Congo, Cameroon, parts of Southern Sudan, Equatorial Guinea, Burundi, Ghana, Botswana, Rwanda, Zambia, Gabon, the Central African Republic, Tanzania, Uganda and Kenya. |

In terms of divergence time estimates, a 2006 study showed that core Tragelaphus (now known to exclude T. angasii and T. imberbis) diverged from Taurotragus (elands) towards the end of the Late Miocene.
