= The Trusty Servant =

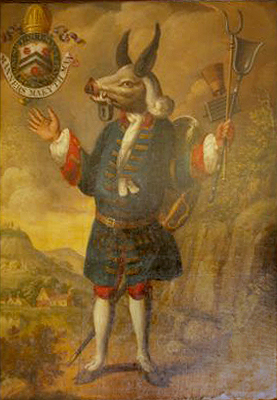
The Trusty Servant

The Trusty Servant is an emblematic figure in a painting at Winchester College and the name of the college's alumni magazine. It was first painted in 1579 by John Hoskins. The current painting is by William Cave, 1809. It hangs on the wall beside the kitchen along with texts in Latin and English.

The painting has a didactic function: it is accompanied by allegorical verses that associate the servant's various animal parts with distinctive virtues that the students of Winchester College are meant to follow.

== Description ==
The wall-painting called The Trusty Servant was painted by John Hoskins in 1579. It was reworked by William Cave in 1809, giving the painting now on display there. It hangs outside the college's kitchen.

The American author Arthur Cleveland Coxe (1818-1896) described the painting as "the time-honoured Hircocervus, or picture of 'the Trusty-servant,' which hangs near the kitchen, and which emblematically sets forth those virtues in domestics, of which we Americans know nothing. It is a figure, part man, part porker, part deer, and part donkey; with a padlock on his mouth, and various other symbols in his hands and about his person, the whole signifying a most valuable character."

== Function ==
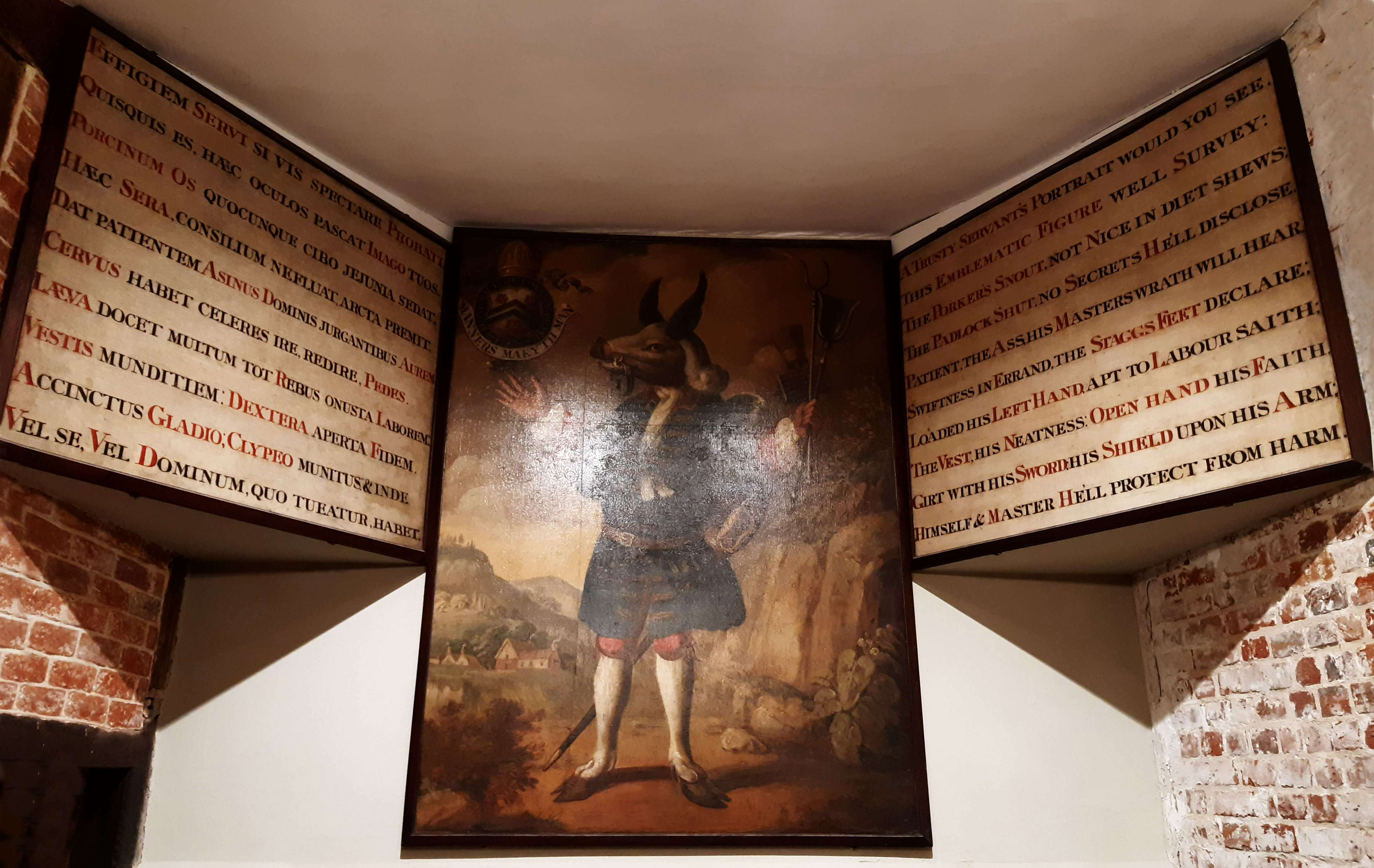
The Trusty Servant and accompanying Latin and English texts, on the wall beside the kitchen, Winchester College

The painting of The Trusty Servant had a didactic function: it is accompanied by allegorical verses that associate the servant's various animal parts with distinctive virtues that the students of Winchester College were meant to follow.

Texts accompanying The Trusty Servant painting on the wall beside the kitchen in Winchester College
Latin

Effigiem servi si vis spectare probati,
Quisquis es, haec oculos pascat imago tuos.
Porcinum os quocunque cibo jejunia sedat:
Haec sera, consilium ne fiat, arcta premit.
Dat patientem asinus dominis jurgantibus aurem;
Cervus habet celeres ire, redire, pedes.
Laeva docet multum tot rebus onusta laborem;
Vestis munditiem, dextera aperta fidem.
Accinctus gladio, clypeo munitus; et inde
Vel se, vel Dominum, quo tueatur, habet.

English

A Trusty Servant's Portrait would you see,
This Emblematic Figure well Survey.
The Porker's Snout not Nice in diet shows;
The Padlock Shut, no Secrets he'll disclose;
Patient the Ass, his Master's wrath will bear;
Swiftness in Errand, the Stagges feet declare;
Loaded his left Hand, apt to Labour saith;
The Vest his Neatness; Open hand his Faith;
Girt with his Sword, his Shield upon his Arm,
Himself and Master he'll protect from Harm.

== Legacy ==
In 2014 Winchester College commissioned a medal by Old Wykehamist Anthony Smith to be awarded to staff in recognition of "Long And Loyal Service". The medal features a relief sculpture of The Trusty Servant as it appears in the painting. The Trusty Servant is the name of the Winchester College alumni magazine. There is a Trusty Servant Inn at Minstead in the New Forest.

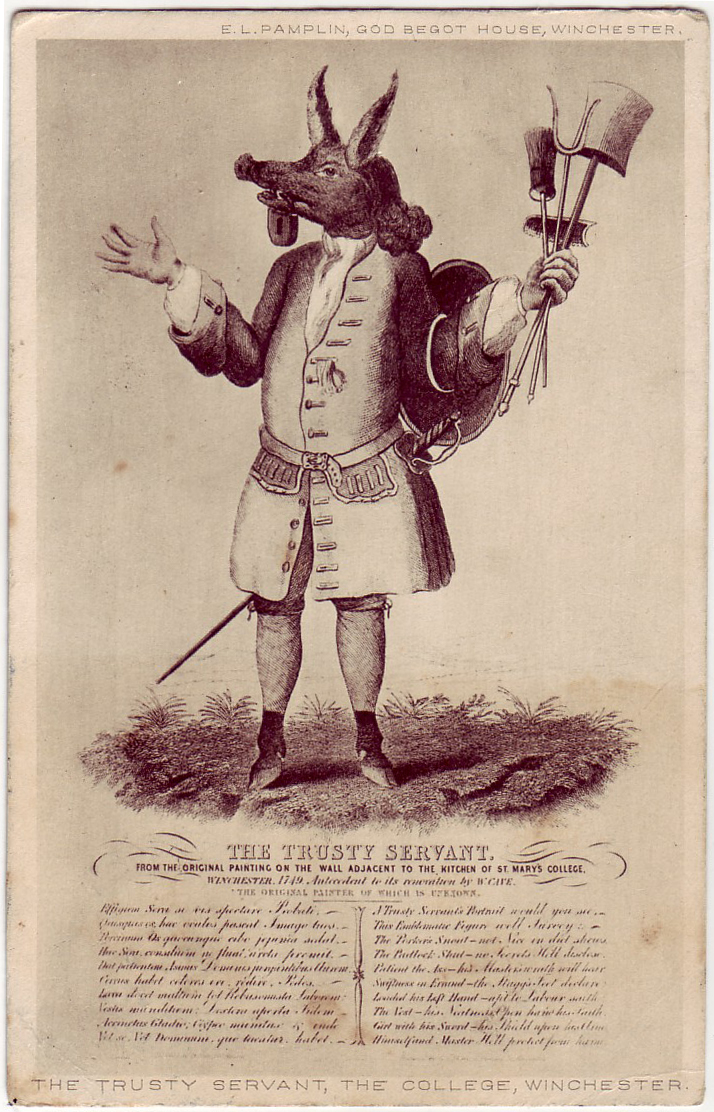
18th century engraving of The Trusty Servant

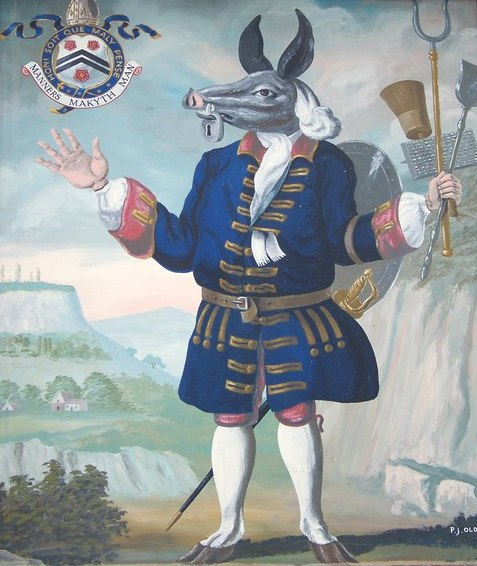
Inn sign at The Trusty Servant Inn, Minstead, Hampshire, painted by P J Oldreive
