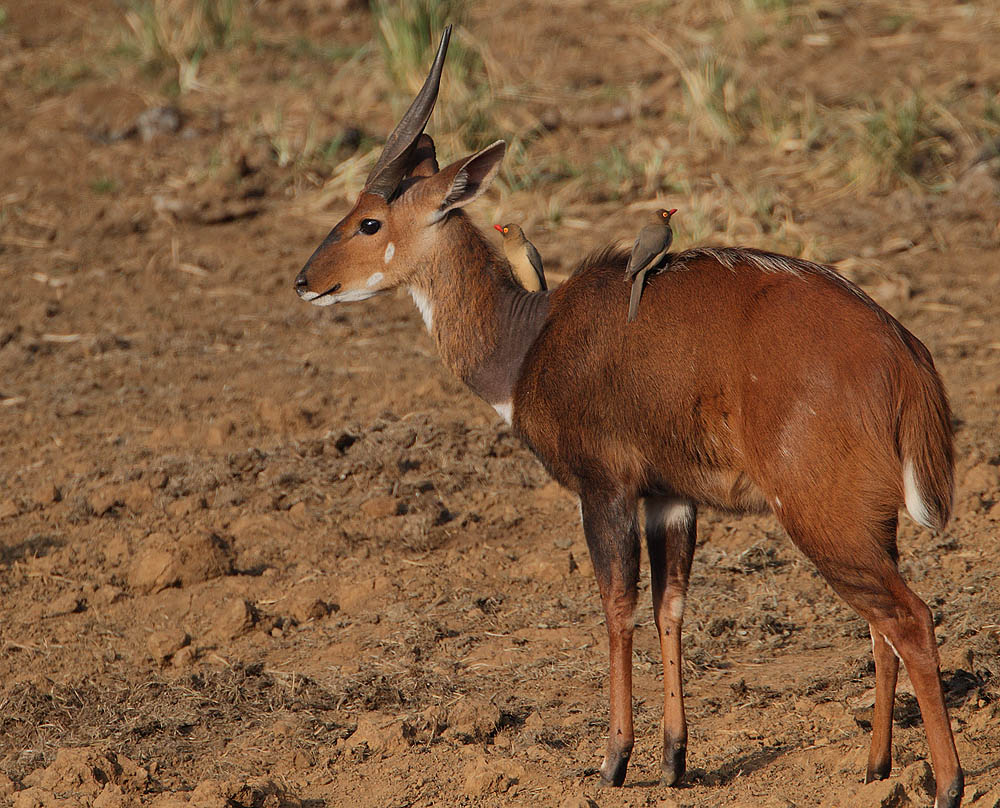
- Male, Kenya
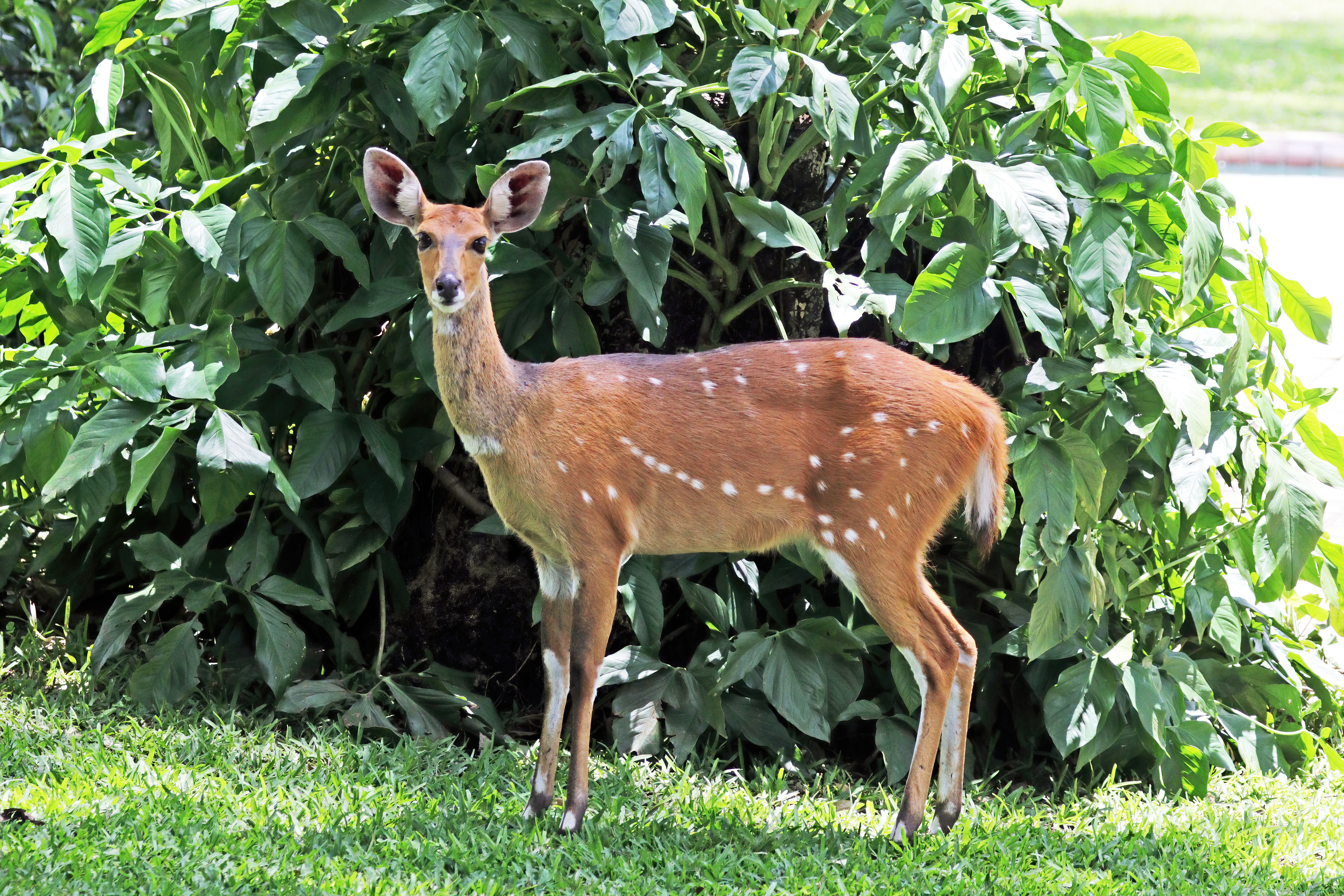
- Female, Zimbabwe

Conservation status
- Least Concern (IUCN 3.1)

Scientific classification
- Kingdom: Animalia
- Phylum: Chordata
- Class: Mammalia
- Order: Artiodactyla
- Family: Bovidae
- Subfamily: Bovinae
- Genus: Tragelaphus
- Subgenus: Tragelaphus
- Species: T. sylvaticus

Binomial name
- Tragelaphus sylvaticus (Sparrman, 1780)
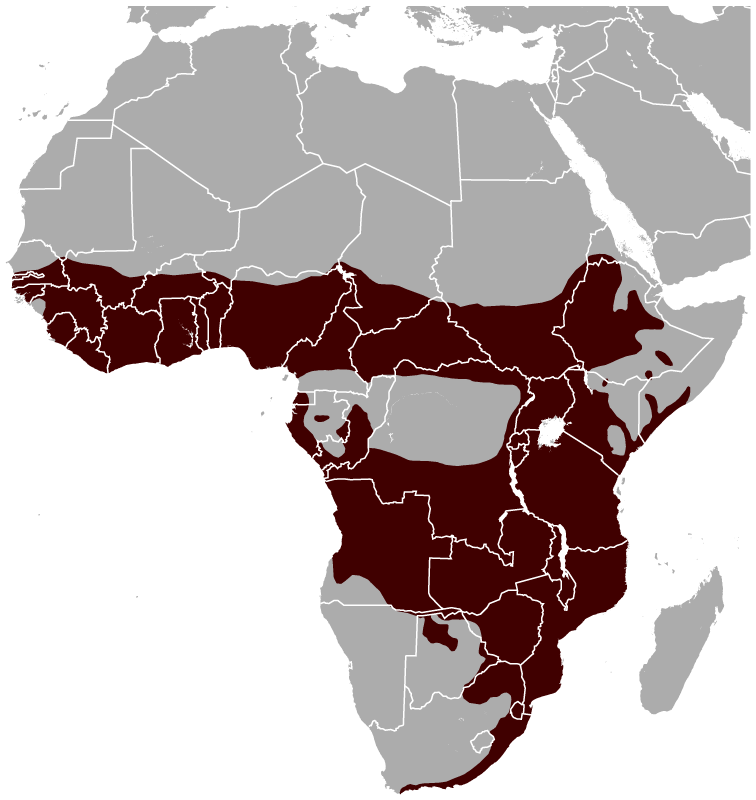
- Combined range of Cape and harnessed bushbuck

= Cape bushbuck =

Species of mammal

The Cape bushbuck (Tragelaphus sylvaticus), also known as imbabala and southern bushbuck, is a common, medium-sized bushland-dwelling, and a widespread species of antelope in sub-Saharan Africa. It is found in a wide range of habitats, such as rain forests, montane forests, forest-savanna mosaic, savanna, bushveld, and woodland. It stands around 90 cm (35 in) at the shoulder and weigh from 45 to 80 kg (99 to 176 lb). They are generally solitary, territorial browsers.

== Taxonomy ==
- - - - - - - Taurotragus
              - Giant eland
              - Common eland
            - - Strepsiceros
                Greater kudu
              - Tragelaphus
                - Mountain nyala
                - - - - Bongo
                      - Sitatunga
                    - - - - Cape bushbuck
                          - Harnessed bushbuck
          - Nyala
            Lowland nyala
        - Ammelaphus
          Lesser kudu

Phylogenetic relationships of the mountain nyala from combined analysis of all molecular data (Willows-Munro et.al. 2005). Subgenera (stem labels) per MDD.

The taxonomy of bushbuck, and of the Tragelaphini tribe in general, has been contested. Bushbuck have been fractured into over 40 subspecies in the past. mtDNA profiles of a large number of samples were resolved in 2009 as belonging to 19 groups, some corresponding to previously described subspecies, while others were previously unrecognised and remained unnamed. These groups were then organised into two taxa - a nominate northern subspecies (T. s. scriptus) and a southern subspecies T. s. sylvaticus. In the 1780 original description of T. sylvaticus from the Cape Region by Sparrman, no mention was made of striping. According to Moodley et al., males of type populations in West Africa are more often striped than southern and eastern specimens, although this is not always the case.

In 2011, Groves and Grubb advocated recognising eight species of bushbuck: T. scriptus (Pallas, 1766); T. phaleratus (Hamilton Smith, 1827); T. bor Heuglin, 1877; T. decula (Rüppell, 1835); T. meneliki Neumann, 1902; T. fasciatus Pocock, 1900; T. ornatus Pocock, 1900; and T. sylvaticus (Sparrman, 1780), grouped in a northern and southern 'group'. The Ethiopian endemic species known as Menelik's bushbuck or decula was classified as a scriptus group species as opposed to Woodley. In the case of Tragelaphus, these 'species' would be based mostly on geography and pelage as opposed to genetics. These proposals are controversial.

In 2018, Hassanin et al. published a molecular phylogenetic study that provided support for the scriptus and sylvaticus species, with a divergence time of at least 2 million years, albeit with considerable genetic diversity within each of these groups.

== Description ==
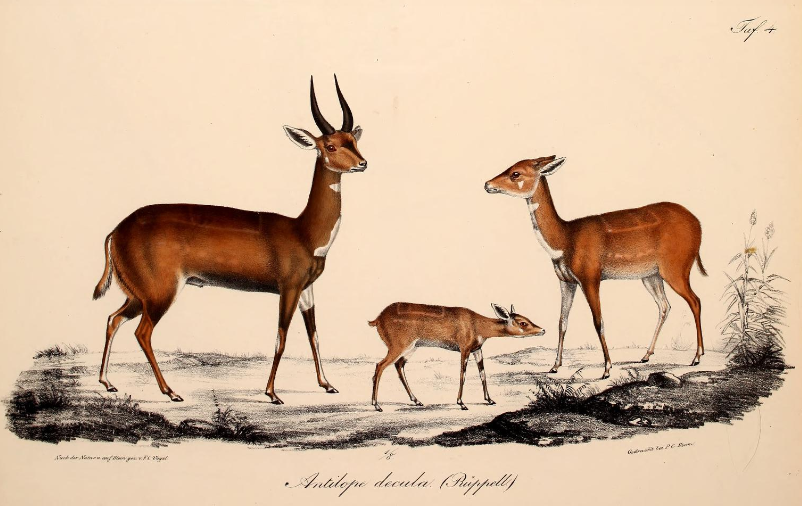
Rüppell's depiction of the Abyssinian bushbuck (1835)

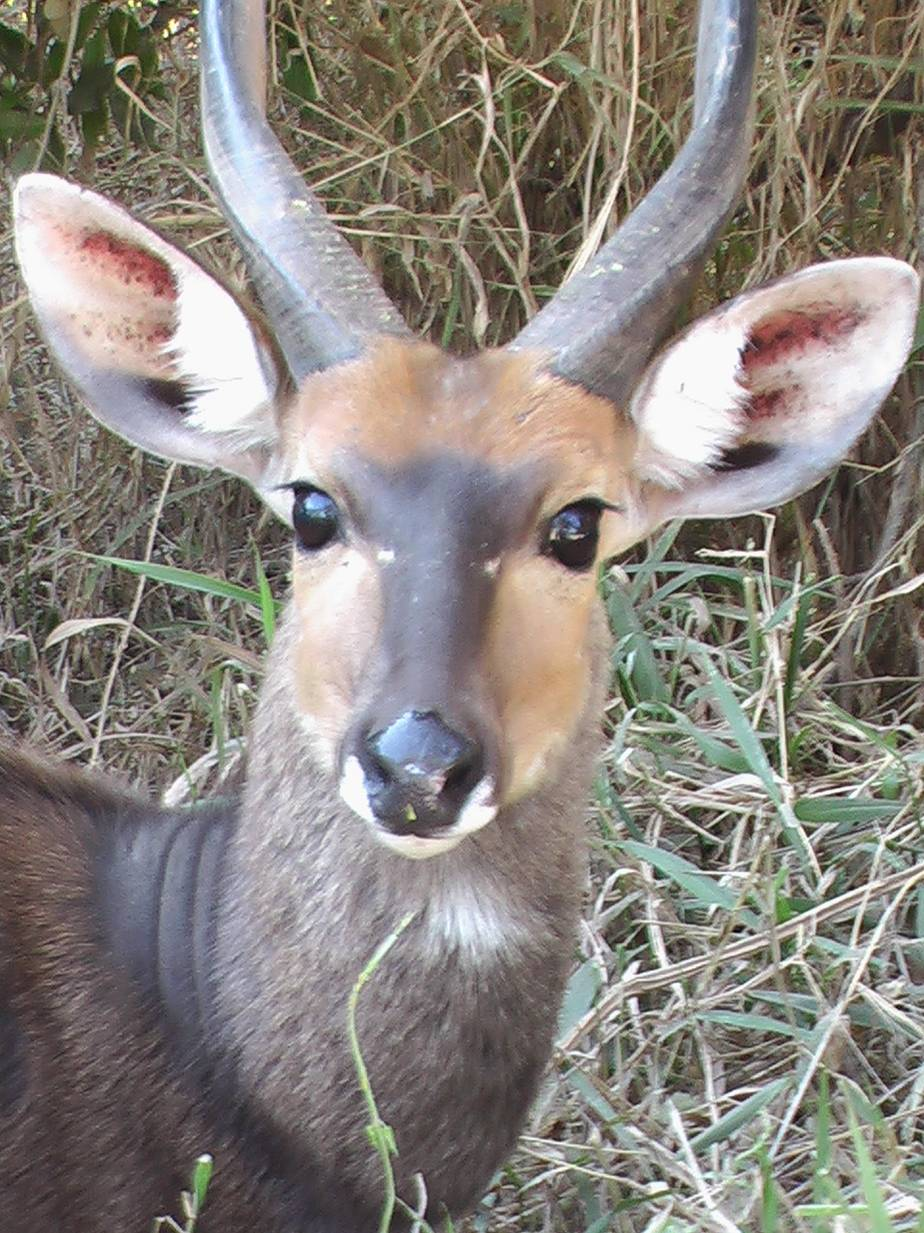
Close-up of a bushbuck ram from the Kruger National Park, South Africa

Cape bushbucks stand around 90 cm (35 in) at the shoulder and weigh from 60 to 80 kg (130 to 180 lb) in males and 25 to 60 kg (55 to 132 lb)in females. They have a light brown coat, with up to seven white stripes and white splotches on the sides. The white patches are usually geometrically shaped and on the most mobile parts of their bodies, such as the ears, chin, tail, legs, and necks. The muzzles are also white. Horns, found only on the males, can reach over half a metre and have a single twist. At 10 months old, young males sprout horns that are particularly twisted and at maturity form the first loop of a spiral.

The Cape bushbuck has on average less striping and more uniform colouration than populations in West Africa. Cape bushbuck occur from the Cape in South Africa to Angola and Zambia and up the eastern part of Africa to Ethiopia and Somalia, according to one interpretation. Other interpretations restrict the taxon to Southern Africa sensu stricto or consider them sensu lato to occur in the above range except eastern Sudan, Ethiopia, and Somalia. The first Latin name that can be attributed to the Cape bushbuck was Antilope sylvatica after Sparrman (1780), described from the Cape Colony.

== Ecology ==
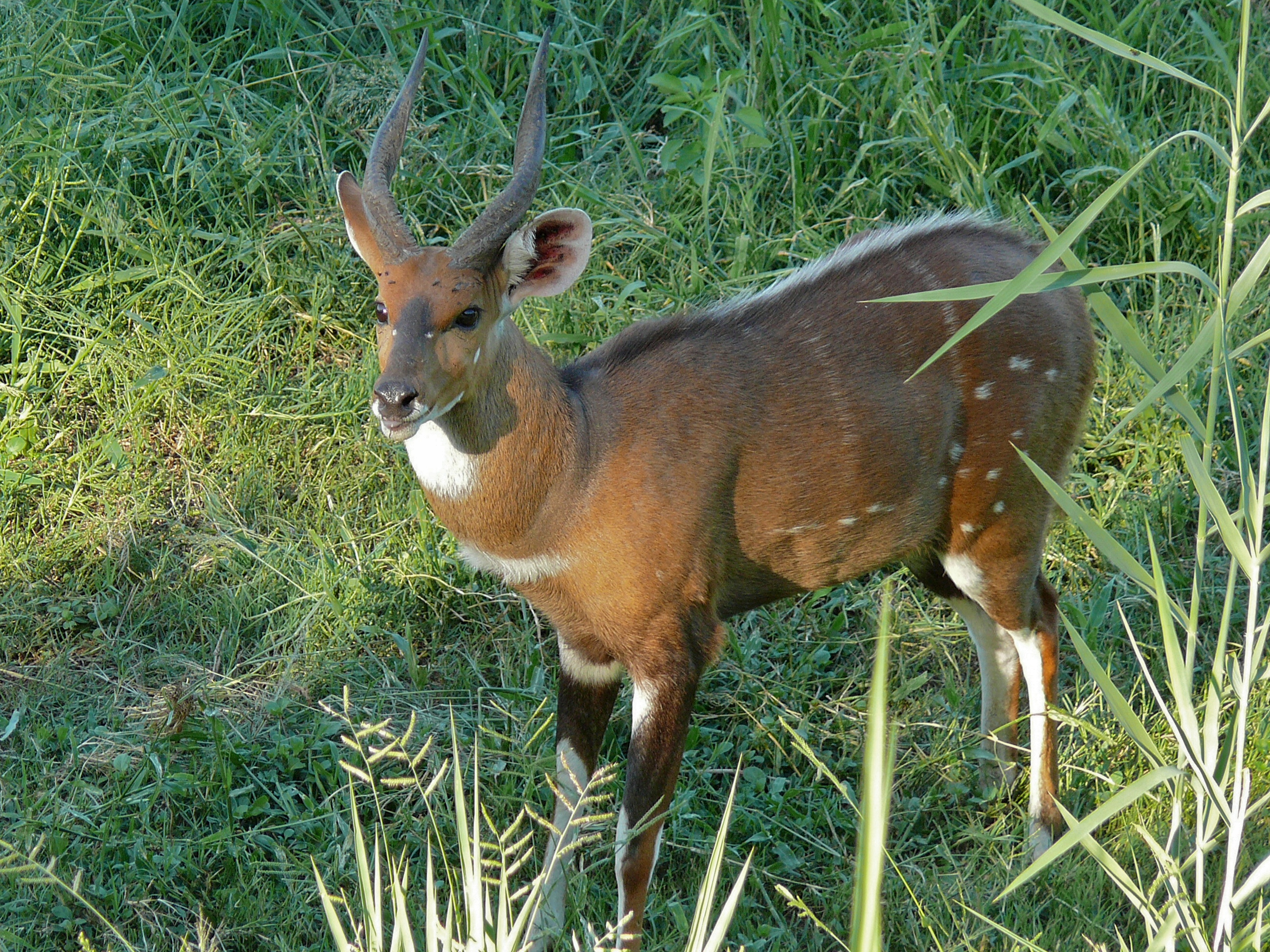
Male with conspicuous striping near Letaba Camp, Kruger National Park, South Africa

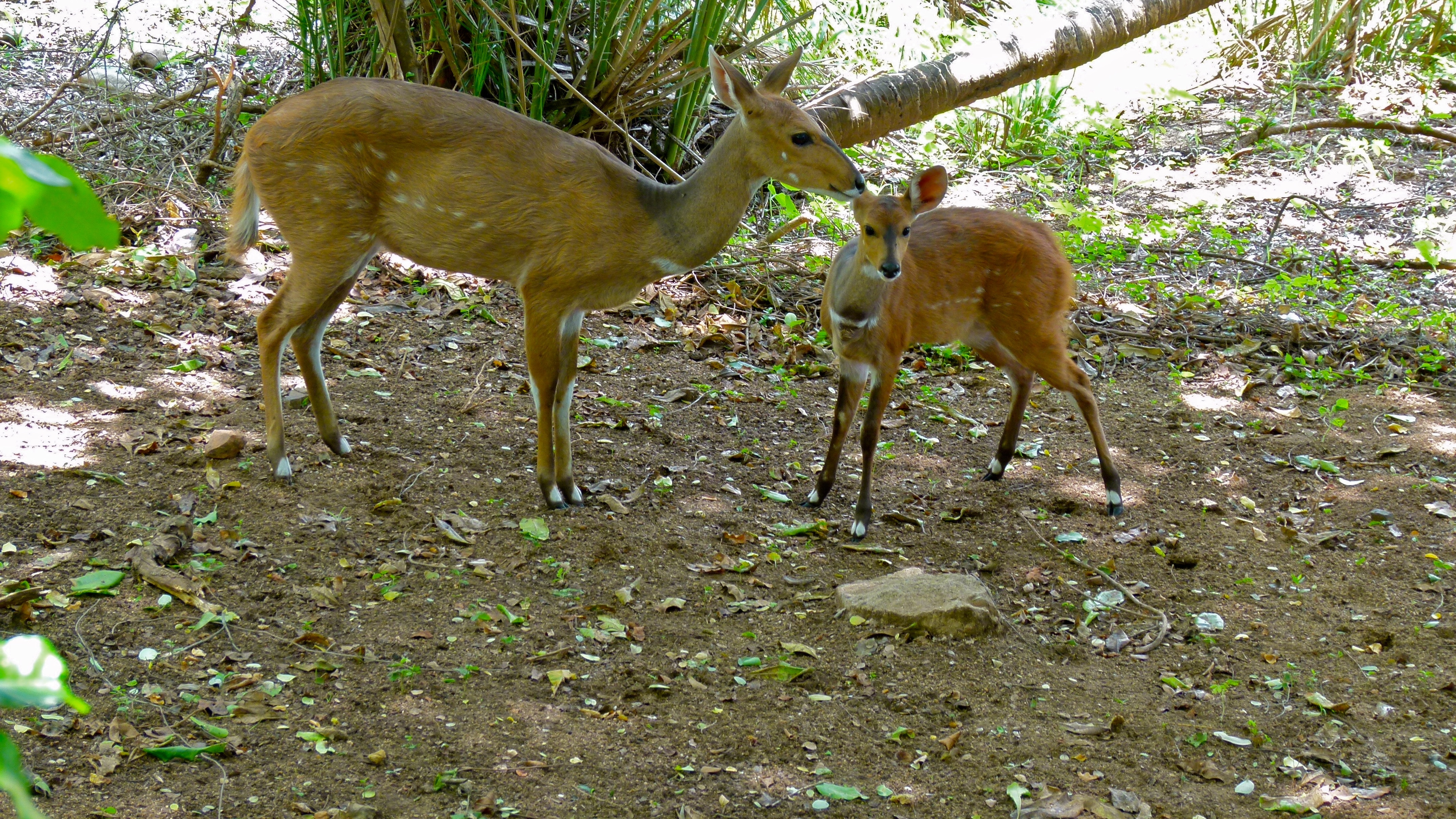
Female and young in Tshokwane, Kruger National Park, South Africa

Bushbuck browse on trees, shrubs, and forbs; they rarely if ever eat grasses. Studies of free-ranging bushbuck in various parts of southeastern Africa using DNA metabarcoding show that bushbuck frequently forage on acacias (Senegalia, Vachellia) and other legumes, along with mallows (Grewia, Hibiscus), bushwillows (Combretum), buckthorns (Berchemia, Ziziphus) and various other plants. Bushbuck are active throughout the day, but tend to be nocturnal near human habitations.

Bushbuck are solitary animals, but are not aggressively antisocial, and individuals sometimes forage in close proximity. Bushbuck live within a "home" area, which is usually around 50,000 m^{2} (540,000 sq ft) on the savannah and much larger in the forest, that they will not normally leave. These areas usually overlap other bushbuck home areas.

Some game farmers in southern Africa discovered that the bushbuck may compete with the closely related, larger nyala when they tried to introduce the two species to the same area. However, the two species are often found in close proximity in natural communities (e.g., in Gorongosa National Park, Mozambique).
