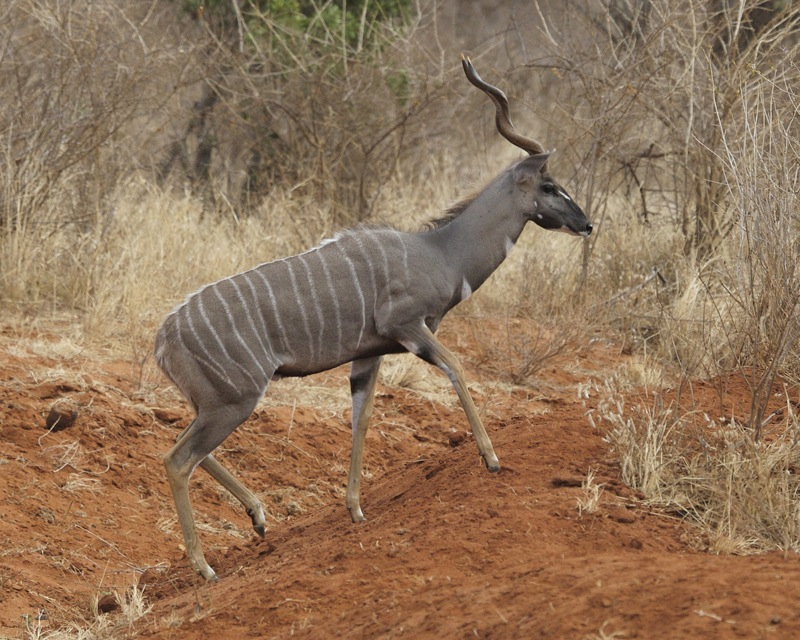
- Adult male

Conservation status
- Near Threatened (IUCN 3.1)

Scientific classification
- Kingdom: Animalia
- Phylum: Chordata
- Class: Mammalia
- Order: Artiodactyla
- Family: Bovidae
- Subfamily: Bovinae
- Genus: Tragelaphus
- Subgenus: Ammelaphus; Heller, 1912
- Species: T. imberbis

Binomial name
- Tragelaphus imberbis (Blyth, 1869)
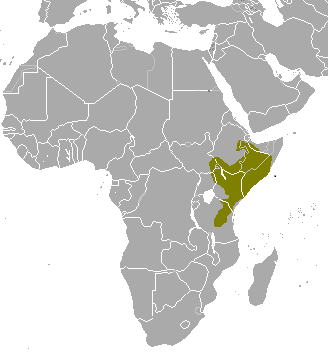
- Range map

Synonyms
- Ammelaphus strepsiceros (Heller, 1912); Ammelaphus australis (Heller, 1913)

= Lesser kudu =

Species of antelope

The lesser kudu (Tragelaphus imberbis) is a medium-sized antelope found in East Africa. The species is not especially closely related to the greater kudu, though both belong the artiodactyl tribe Tragelaphini (family Bovidae), of striped, spiral-horned African bovids, along with the nyala, elands, balbok, bushbucks, bongo, and sitatunga. It was first scientifically described by English zoologist Edward Blyth in 1869. The species is sometimes assigned as the only species of the genus Ammelaphus, with that designation typically as a subgenus.

The lesser kudu is a browser subsisting off of foliage from tall bushes, trees, and herbaceous perennial plants. They are not territorial, and mainly crepuscular, preferring to be active after dusk until the dawn hours, seeking shelter in dense thickets just after the sunrise. The Lesser Kudu inhabits dry bushland regions, bordering on arid grasslands, as well as scrubland and light open forest habitat.

The lesser kudu is native to Ethiopia, Kenya, Somalia, South Sudan, Tanzania, and Uganda, but it is possibly extirpated from Djibouti. It may have been present in Saudi Arabia and Yemen as recently as 1967, though its presence in the Arabian Peninsula is still controversial.

The total population of the Lesser Kudu is decreasing. Presently, the International Union for Conservation of Nature rates the Lesser Kudu as "near threatened".

The handsome head of the male Lesser Kudu, with his elegant spiraled horns, is the symbol of the Saint Louis Zoo.

== Taxonomy and genetics ==
- - - - - - - Taurotragus
              - Giant eland
              - Common eland
            - - Strepsiceros
                Greater kudu
              - Tragelaphus
                - Mountain nyala
                - - - - Bongo
                      - Sitatunga
                    - - - - Cape bushbuck
                          - Harnessed bushbuck
          - Nyala
            Lowland nyala
        - Ammelaphus
          Lesser kudu

Phylogenetic relationships of the mountain nyala from combined analysis of all molecular data (Willows-Munro et.al. 2005). Subgenera (stem labels) per MDD.

The scientific name of the lesser kudu is Tragelaphus imberbis. The animal is classified under the genus Tragelaphus in family Bovidae. It was first described by the English zoologist Edward Blyth in 1869. The generic name, Tragelaphus, derives from Greek word tragos, meaning a male goat, and elaphos, which means a deer, while the specific name imberbis comes from the Latin term meaning unbearded, referring to this kudu's lack of mane. The vernacular name kudu (or koodoo) may have originated from the Khoikhoi kudu, or via the Afrikaans koedoe. The term "lesser" denotes the smaller size of this antelope as compared to the greater kudu.

In 1912, the genus Ammelaphus was established for just the lesser kudu by American zoologist Edmund Heller, the type species being A. strepsiceros. The lesser kudu is now typically placed in Tragelaphus. A 2011 publication by Colin Groves and Peter Grubb argues for the lesser kudu's renewed placement in the genus Ammelaphus on the grounds that this species is part of the earliest-diverging lineage of its tribe, having split from the main lineage before it separated into Tragelaphus and Taurotragus. However, As of 2026 the American Society of Mammalogists lists the species as Tragelaphus imberbis.

In 2005, Sandi Willows-Munro (of the University of KwaZulu-Natal) and colleagues carried out a mitochondrial analysis of the nine Tragelaphus species. mtDNA and nDNA data were compared. The results showed that the tribe Tragelaphini is monophyletic with the lesser kudu basal in the phylogeny, followed by the nyala (T. angasii). On the basis of mitochondrial data, the lesser kudu separated from its sister clade around 13.7 million years ago. However, the nuclear data show that lesser kudu and nyala form a clade, and collectively separated from the sister clade 13.8 million years ago.

The lesser kudu has 38 diploid chromosomes. However, unlike others in the subfamily Tragelaphinae, the X chromosome and Y chromosome are compound and each is fused with one of two identical autosomes.

== Physical description ==
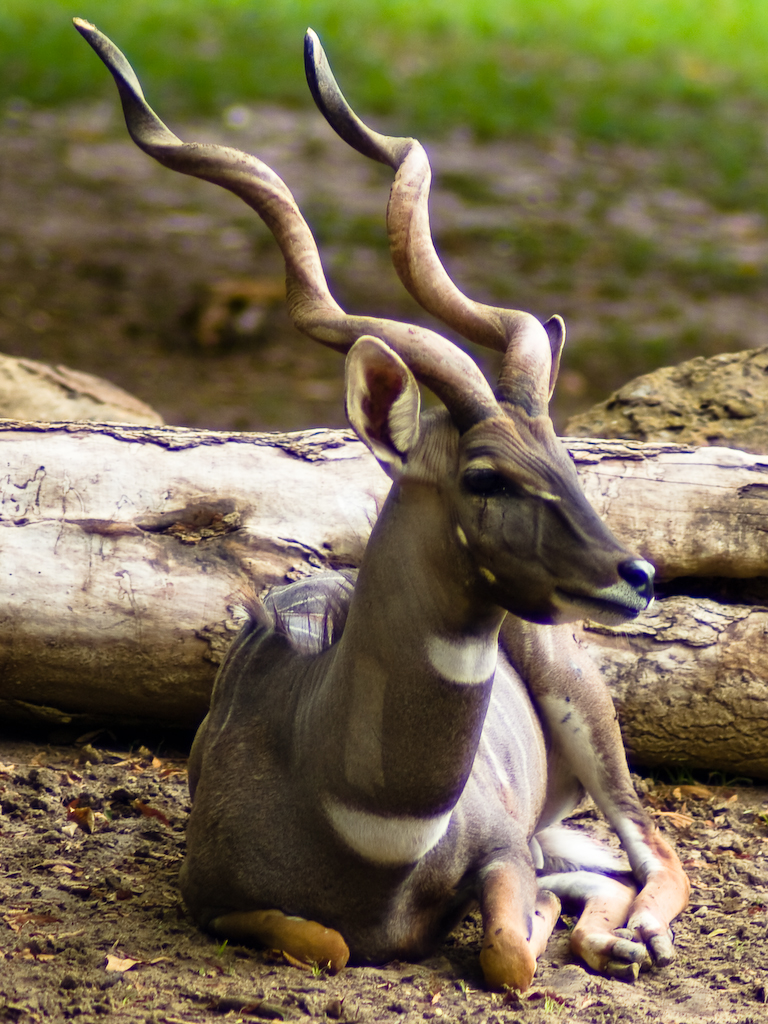
Male lesser kudu

The lesser kudu is a spiral-horned antelope, characterised by large, rounded ears. The head-and-body length is typically between 110 and 140 cm (43 and 55 in). Males reach about 95–105 cm (37–41 in) at the shoulder, while females reach 90–100 cm (35–39 in). Males typically weigh 92–108 kg (203–238 lb) and females 56–70 kg (123–154 lb). The bushy tail is 25–40 cm (9.8–15.7 in) long, white underneath and with a black tip at the end.

Distinct signs of sexual dimorphism are seen in the antelope. The female is considerably smaller than the male. The females and juveniles have a rufous coat. Females have four teats.

Horns are present only on males. The spiral horns are 50–70 cm (20–28 in) long, and have two to two-and-a-half twists. The base circumference is 156–171 cm (61–67 in). The slender horns are dark brown and tipped with white. Males begin developing horns after 6-8 months, which reach full length after 3 years. Their rufous body coat becomes yellowish grey or darker after the age of 2 years. The male has a more prominent black crest of hair on the neck than the female. Males also have distinct black "masks" on their faces, with a black underside going up to the sternum.

In juveniles and adults of both sexes, one long white stripe runs along the back, with 11–14 white stripes branching towards the sides. The chest has a central black stripe, and unlike in the Greater Kudu or Nyala, no throat beard is present. A black stripe runs from each eye to the nose and a white one from each eye to the centre of the dark face. A chevron is present between the eyes. The area around the lips is white, the throat has white patches, and two white spots appear on each side of the lower jaw. The underparts are completely white, while the slender legs are tawny and have black and white patches. These markings may aid in camouflaging and hiding amidst shrubbery, as well as helping to cool specific areas of the body through albedo.

== Ecology and behavior ==
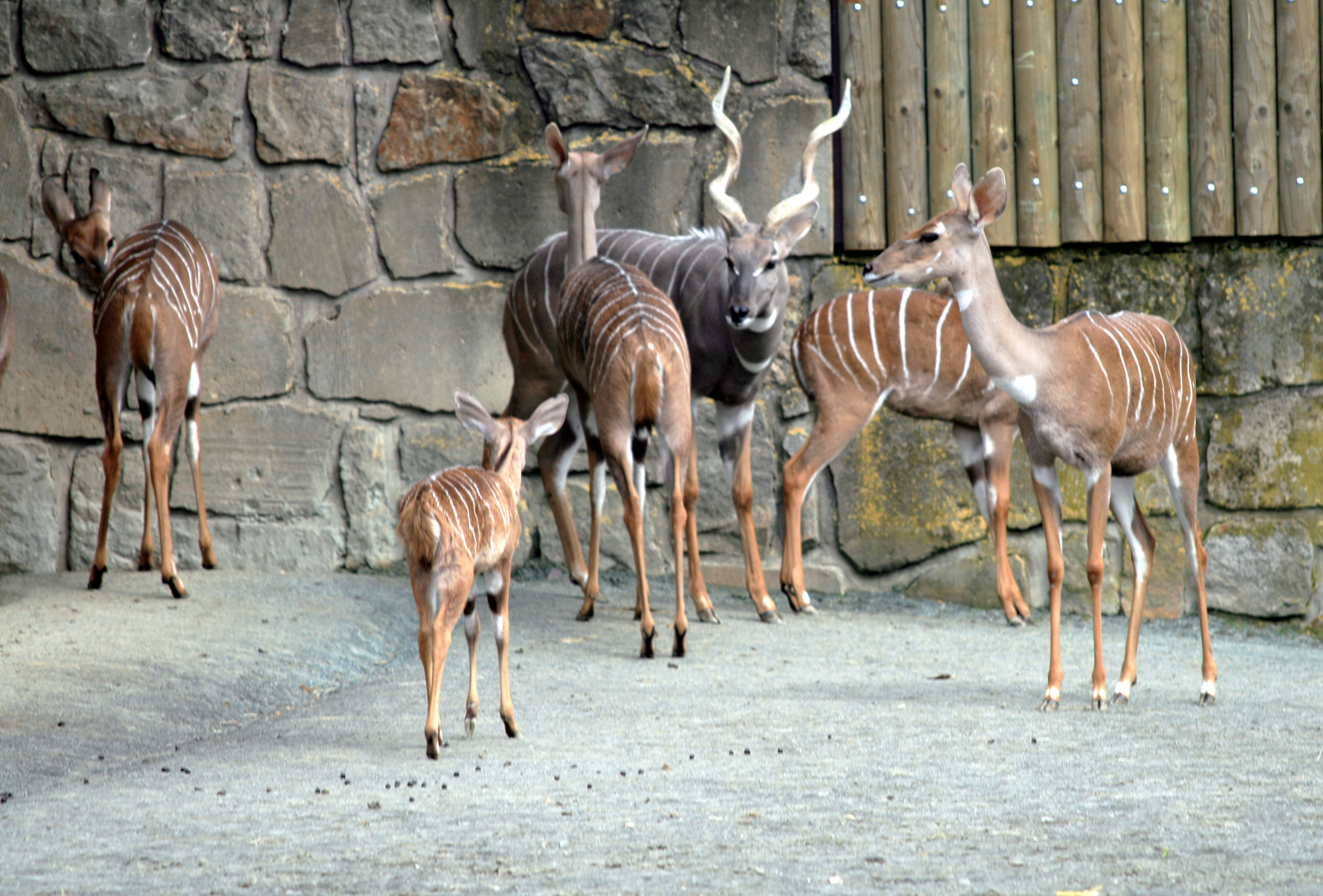
Herd of lesser kudu in Dvůr Králové Zoo

The lesser kudu is mainly active at night and during the dawn, and seeks shelter in dense thickets just after the sunrise. The midday is spent in rest and rumination in shaded areas. They spend about equal time foraging, standing and lying, and roaming.

The lesser kudu is a shy and wary animal. It can camouflage so well in dense vegetation such that only its ears and tail can indicate its presence. The lesser kudu's thin torso allows it to move through dense vegetation with ease. When alarmed, the animal stands motionless. If it senses any approaching predator, it gives out a short sharp bark, similar to the bushbuck's, then makes multiple leaps up to 2 m (6.6 ft) high with an upraised tail. If captured, the victim gives a loud bleat.

Lesser kudus are gregarious in nature, especially females. No distinct leader or any hierarchy is noted in the social structure; with no territorial behavior, fights are uncommon. While fighting, the lesser kudus interlock horns and try pushing one another. Mutual grooming is rarely observed. Unlike most tragelaphines, females can be closely associated for several years. One to three females, along with their offspring, may form a group. Juvenile males leave their mothers when aged a year and a half, and may form pairs. However, at the age of 4-5 years, males prefer a solitary lifestyle and avoid one another, though four or five bulls may share the same home range. Lesser kudu do not usually associate with other animals, except when they feed in the same area.

Its tracks are similar to the Greater Kudu's.

=== Diet ===
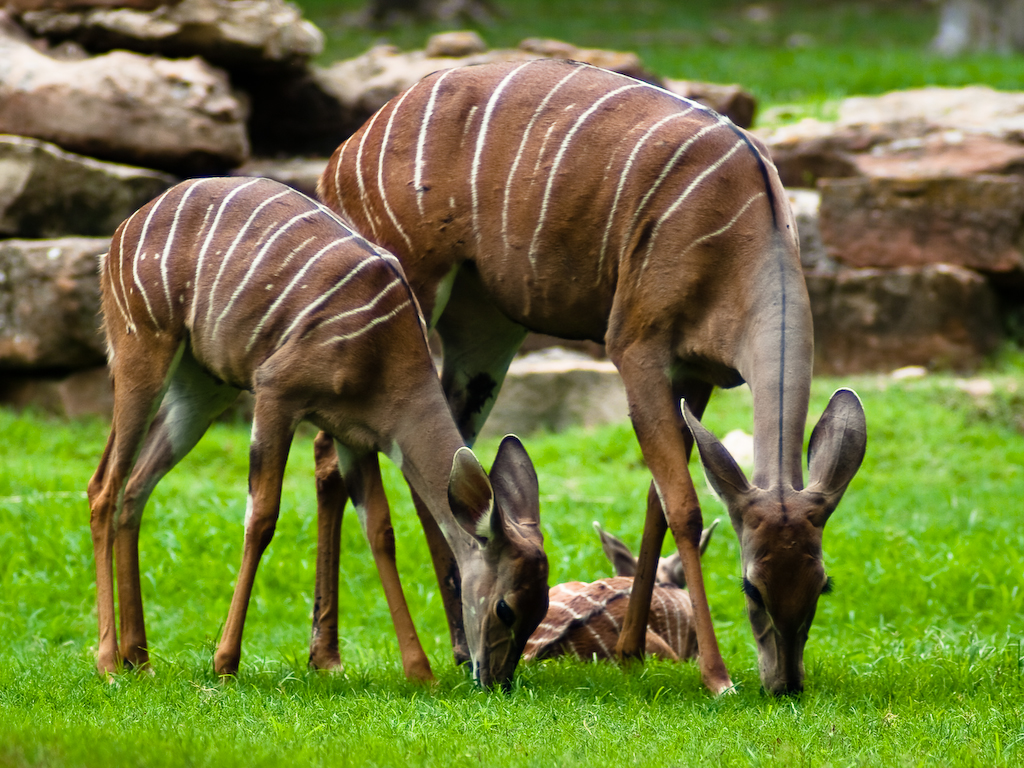
Feeding female and juvenile

The lesser kudu browses primarily at dusk or dawn, or nocturnally, and is sometimes associated with gerenuk and the impala. The lesser kudu and the gerenuk might compete for evergreen species in the dry season. However, unlike the long-necked gerenuk, the lesser kudu rarely consumes Acacia species, and does not stand on its hindlegs while feeding. The lesser kudu likewise does not have a great requirement for water, and can thrive in arid environments as it is able to extract sufficient moisture from succulent plants, such as the leaves of wild sisal and Sansevieria ('snake-plants', genus Dracaena), and certain species of the poisonous Euphorbiaceae family; it drinks water readily when rains come or when sources are available.

A browser, the lesser kudu feeds on foliage from herbs, bushes and trees. It also eats flowers and fruits if available, and takes small proportions of grasses, usually in the wet season. Despite seasonal and local variations, foliage from trees and shrubs constitutes 60-80% of the diet throughout the year. Foliage from creepers and vines (such as Thunbergia guerkeana and some species of Cucurbitaceae and Convulvulaceae) forms 15-25% of the diet in the wet season. Fruits are consumed mainly in the dry season. Olfactory searching, much in the same posture as grazing, is used to find fallen fruits (such as Melia volkensii and Acacia tortilis), while small fruits (such as Commiphora species) are directly plucked from trees. The size and structure of its stomach also suggests its primary dependence on browse.

=== Reproduction ===
Both the males and females become sexually mature by the time they are a year and a half old. However, males actually mate after the age of four to five years. Males and females are most reproductive till the age of 14 and 14–18 years, respectively, with the maximum age of successful lactation in females being 13–14 years.

Lesser Kudus have no fixed breeding season; births may occur at any time of the year. A study at Dvůr Králové Zoo (Czech Republic) showed that 55% of the births occurred between September and December. A rutting male tests the urine of any female he encounters, to which the female responds by urinating. Having located a female in estrus, the male follows her closely, trying to rub his cheek on her rump, head, neck, and chest. He performs gasping movements with his lips. Finally, the male mounts the female, resting his head and neck on her back, in a similar way as other tragelaphines.

The gestational period is 7-8 months, after which a single calf is born. A female about to give birth isolates herself from her group, and remains alone for some days afterward. The newborn calf weighs 4–7.5 kg (8.8–16.5 lb). Around 50% of the calves die within the first six months of birth, and only 25% can survive after three years. In a study at Basle Zoo (Switzerland), where 43% of the offspring from captive breeding died before reaching the age of six months, the major causes of high juvenile mortality were found to be the spread of white muscle disease and deficiency of vitamin E and selenium in diets. The herd size, sex, interbreeding, and season did not play any role in juvenile mortality. The mother hides her calf while she goes out to feed, and returns mainly in the evening to suckle her young. She checks the calf's identity by sniffing its rump or neck. In the first month, suckling may occur for 8 minutes. The mother and calf communicate with low bleats. She licks her offspring, particularly in the perineal region, and may consume its excreta.

The average lifespan is 10 years in the wild, and 15 years in captivity.

== Habitat and distribution ==
The Lesser Kudu inhabits dry bushland regions. It is closely associated with Acacia and Commiphora thornbush in semiarid areas of northeastern Africa. The animal avoids open areas and long grass, preferring shaded areas with short grasses instead. Found in woodlands and hilly areas, as well, the lesser kudu is generally found at altitudes below 1,200 m (3,900 ft); though they have been recorded at heights about 1,740 m (5,710 ft) near Mount Kilimanjaro. While individual home ranges of these animals are 0.4–6.7 km^{2} (4,300,000–72,000,000 sq ft) in size, those of males have an average size of 2.2 km^{2} (24,000,000 sq ft) and those of females 1.8 km^{2} (19,000,000 sq ft).

The Lesser Kudu is largely confined to the Horn of Africa today, historically ranging from Awash southward through southern and eastern Ethiopia, and most parts of Somalia (except the northeast) and Kenya (except the southwest). It also occurred in eastern South Sudan and northeastern and eastern parts of Uganda and Tanzania, but it has been extirpated in Djibouti.. Evidence for its existence in the Arabian Peninsula includes a set of horns obtained in 1967 from an individual shot in South Yemen and another in Saudi Arabia, as well as a recent analysis of early and middle Holocene rock art sites in Jubbah and Shuwaymis, Ha'il province, Saudi Arabia.

== Threats and conservation ==
The Lesser Kudu's shyness and its ability to camouflage itself in dense cover has protected it from the risks of poaching. For instance, the Lesser Kudu is widespread in the Ogaden region, which is rich in dense bush, despite intense hunting by local people.

However, rinderpest outbreaks, to which the Lesser Kudu is highly susceptible, have resulted in a steep decline of 60% in the animal's population in Tsavo National Park in Kenya.

Around a third of the population of the Lesser Kudu occurs in protected areas such as Awash, Omo and Mago National Parks (Ethiopia); Lag Badana National Park (Somalia); Tsavo National Park (Kenya); Ruaha National Park and game reserves (Tanzania), though it occurs in larger numbers outside these areas. Population density rarely exceeds 1/km^{2}., and is generally much lower.

Overgrazing, human settlement, and loss of habitat are some other threats to their survival. The total population has been estimated to be nearly 118,000, with a decreasing trend in populations. The rate of decline has increased to 20% over two decades. Presently, the IUCN rates the Lesser Kudu as "near threatened".
