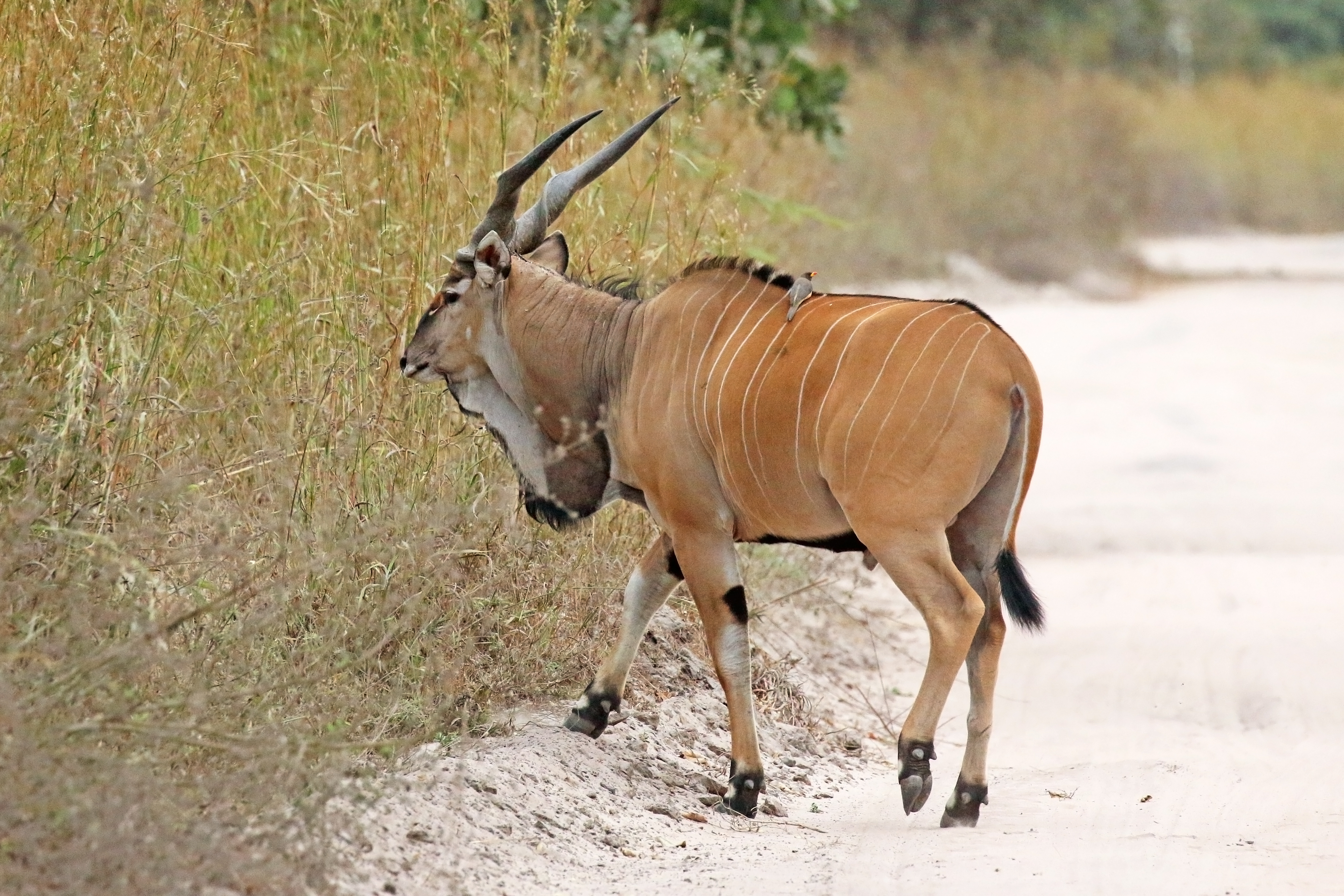
- T. d. derbianus Senegal
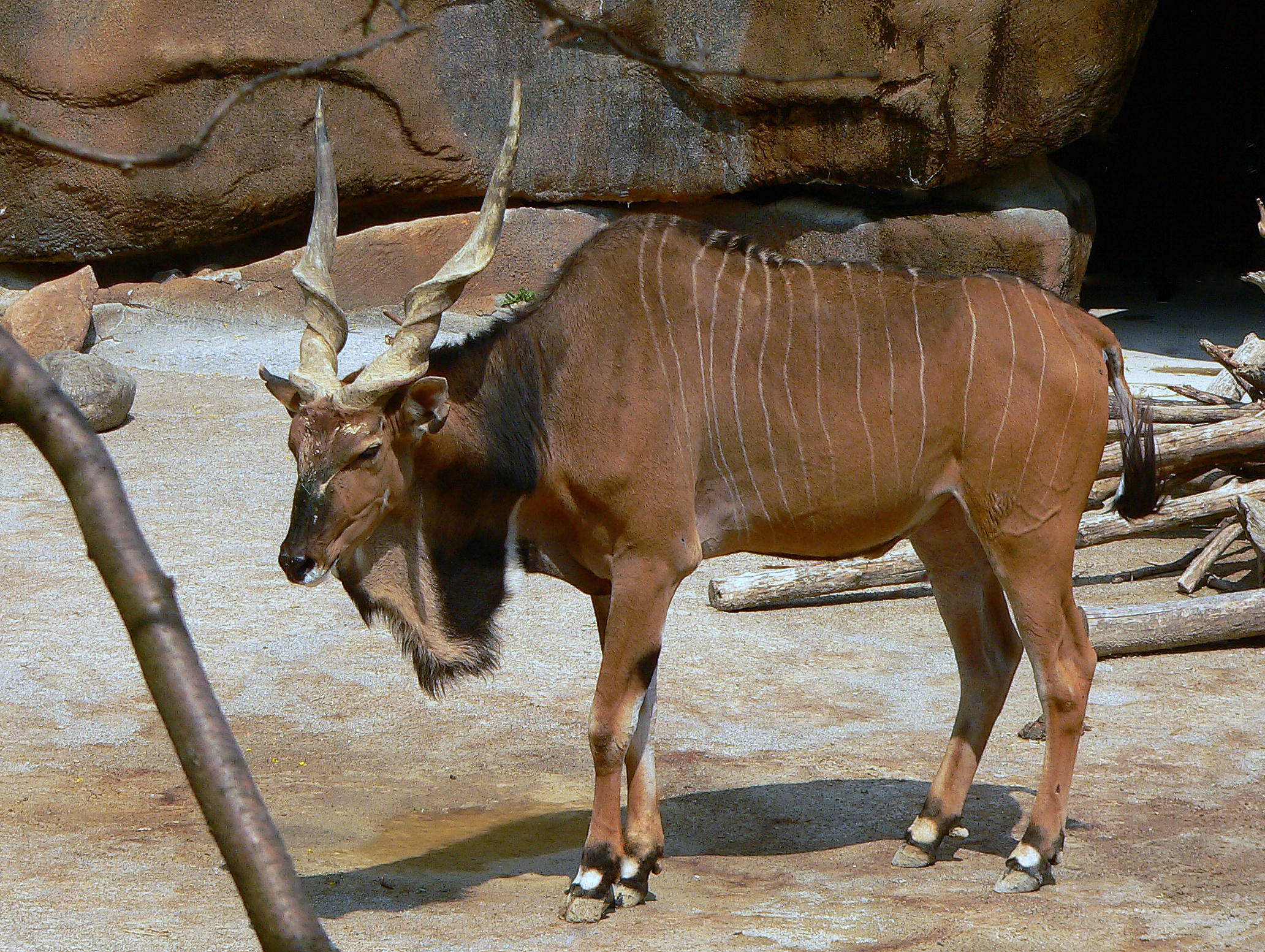
- T. d. gigas at the Cincinnati Zoo

Conservation status
- Vulnerable (IUCN 3.1)

Scientific classification
- Kingdom: Animalia
- Phylum: Chordata
- Class: Mammalia
- Order: Artiodactyla
- Family: Bovidae
- Subfamily: Bovinae
- Genus: Tragelaphus
- Subgenus: Taurotragus
- Species: T. derbianus

Binomial name
- Tragelaphus derbianus (J.E. Gray, 1847)

Subspecies
- T. d. derbianus; T. d. gigas
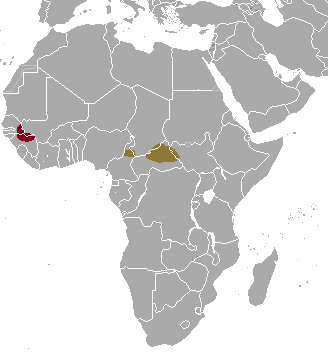
- Distribution of giant eland subspecies: Western giant eland Eastern giant eland

Synonyms
- Species synonymy: Tragelaphus derbianus (J.E. Gray, 1847); Boselaphus derbianus J.E. Gray, 1847; Tragelaphus colini (de Rochebrune, 1883); Tragelaphus typicus Rowland Ward, 1910; Tragelaphus gigas (Heuglin, 1863); Tragelaphus cameroonensis Millais, 1924; Tragelaphus congolanus W. Rothschild, 1913; Tragelaphus derbii (Johnston, 1884)

= Giant eland =

Species of bovine mammal

The giant eland (Tragelaphus derbianus), also known as Lord Derby's eland or greater eland, is an open-forest and savanna antelope. A species of the family Bovidae and genus Tragelaphus, it was described in 1847 by John Edward Gray. The giant eland is the largest species of antelope, with a body length ranging from 220–290 cm (7.2–9.5 ft). There are two subspecies: T. d. derbianus and T. d. gigas.

The giant eland is a herbivore, eating grasses, foliage and branches. They usually form small herds consisting of 15–25 members, both males and females. Giant elands are not territorial, and have large home ranges. They are naturally alert and wary, which makes them difficult to approach and observe. They can run at up to 70 km/h (43 mph) and use this speed as a defence against predators. Mating occurs throughout the year but peaks in the wet season. They mostly inhabit broad-leafed savannas, woodlands and glades.

The giant eland is native to Cameroon, Central African Republic, Chad, Democratic Republic of the Congo, Guinea, Mali, Senegal, and South Sudan. It is no longer present in The Gambia, Ghana, Ivory Coast, and Togo. It can also be found in the Jos wildlife park in Nigeria, Guinea-Bissau, and Uganda. The subspecies have been listed with different conservation statuses by the International Union for Conservation of Nature (IUCN).

== Etymology ==
The scientific name of the giant eland is Tragelaphus derbianus. The genus name is not of modern scientific invention, but comes from ancient Greek τραγέλαφος (tragélaphos), from τράγος (trágos), meaning a "male goat", and ἔλαφος (élaphos), meaning a "deer".

The giant eland is also called "Lord Derby's eland" in honour of Edward Smith-Stanley, 13th Earl of Derby. It was due to his efforts that the giant eland was first introduced to England between 1835 and 1851. Lord Derby sent botanist Joseph Burke to collect animals, either alive or dead, from South Africa for his museum and menagerie. The first elands introduced in England were a pair of common elands, and what would later be identified as a giant eland bull. The details were recorded in Smith-Stanley's privately printed work, Gleanings from the Menagerie at Knowsley Hall. The Latin name indicates that it "belonged to" (given by the suffix -anus) Derby, hence derbianus.

Although the giant eland is somewhat larger than the common eland, the epithet 'giant' actually refers to its large horns. The name 'eland' is Dutch for "elk" or "moose". It has a Baltic source similar to the Lithuanian élnis, which means "deer". It was borrowed earlier as ellan (French) in the 1610s or elend (German).

== Taxonomy ==
- - - - - - - Taurotragus
              - Giant eland
              - Common eland
            - - Strepsiceros
                Greater kudu
              - Tragelaphus
                - Mountain nyala
                - - - - Bongo
                      - Sitatunga
                    - - - - Cape bushbuck
                          - Harnessed bushbuck
          - Nyala
            Lowland nyala
        - Ammelaphus
          Lesser kudu

Phylogenetic relationships of the mountain nyala from combined analysis of all molecular data (Willows-Munro et.al. 2005). Subgenera (stem labels) per MDD.

The giant eland was first described in 1847 by John Edward Gray, a British zoologist, who called it Boselaphus derbianus. At that time, it was also called the 'black-necked eland' and Gingi-ganga.

Giant eland is placed in the genus Tragelaphus of family Bovidae. The genus is split into multiple subgenera on the basis of molecular phylogenetics, with this species assigned to the subgenus Taurotragus, along with the common eland (T. oryx). Although some authors, like Theodor Haltenorth, regarded the giant eland as conspecific with the common eland, they are usually considered two distinct species.

Two subspecies of giant eland have been recognized:

Image	Name	Distribution
	T. d. derbianus J. E. Gray, 1847 – western giant eland	found in western Africa, particularly Senegal to Mali
	T. d. gigas Heuglin, 1863 – eastern giant eland	found in central to eastern Africa, particularly Cameroon to South Sudan

== Description ==
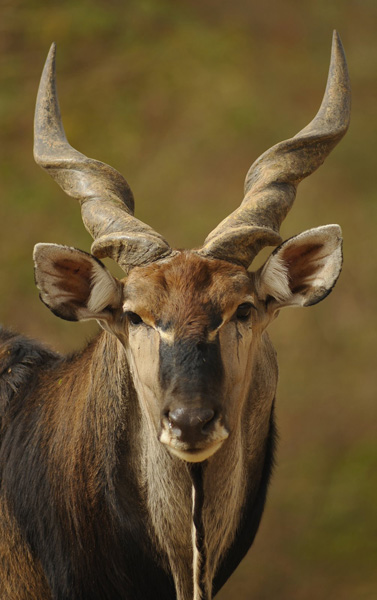
Giant elands have tightly spiraled, V-shaped horns.

The giant eland is a spiral-horned antelope. Despite its common name, this species broadly overlaps in size with the common eland (Tragelaphus oryx). However, the giant eland is somewhat larger on average than the common eland and is thus the largest species of antelope in the world. It is typically between 219 and 291 cm (7.19 and 9.55 ft) in head-and-body length and stands approximately 128 to 181 cm (4.20 to 5.94 ft) at the shoulder. Giant elands exhibit sexual dimorphism, as males are larger than females. The males weigh 400 to 1,200 kg (880 to 2,650 lb) and females weigh 300 to 600 kg (660 to 1,320 lb). The tail is long, having a dark tuft of hair, and averages 91 cm (36 in) in length. The life expectancy of the giant eland is up to 25 years.

The smooth coat is reddish-brown to chestnut, usually darker in males than females, with 8–12 well-defined vertical white stripes on the torso. The colour of the male's coat darkens with age. According to zoologist Jakob Bro-Jørgensen, the colour of the male's coat can reflect the levels of androgen, a male hormone, which is highest during rutting. Comparing the subspecies, T. d. derbianus is characterised by 15 body stripes, smaller size, and a rufous colour, while T. d. gigas is larger, a sandy colour, and has 12 body stripes.

A crest of short black hair extends down the neck to the middle of the back, and is particularly prominent on the shoulders. The slender legs are slightly lighter on their inner surfaces, with black and white markings just above the hooves. There are large black spots on the upper forelegs. The bridge of the nose is charcoal black, and there is a thin, indistinct tan-coloured line, which is the chevron, between the eyes. The lips are white, as are several dots along the jawline. A pendulous dewlap, larger in males than females, originates from between the jowls and hangs to the upper chest when they reach sexual maturity, with a fringe of hair on its edge. The large ears of the giant eland serve as signaling devices. Giant elands have comparatively longer legs than the common eland, as well as much brighter black and white markings on the legs and pasterns.

Both sexes have tightly spiraled, V-shaped horns. They can be up to 124 cm (4.07 ft) long on males and 67 cm (2.20 ft) on females. Males have horns that are thicker at the ends, longer, and more divergent than those of females. These features of the horns suggest that the giant eland evolved from an ancestor with true display horns.

=== Parasites ===
Fecal studies of the western giant eland revealed the presence of a newly found species Eimeria derbani, of genus Eimeria, which consists of Apicomplexan parasites. The sporulation lasted for two days at a temperature of 23 °C (73 °F). The species has been differentiated from E. canna and E. triffittae, which parasitize the common eland (T. oryx). The giant eland is also parasitised by Carmyerius spatiosus (a trematode species), Taenia crocutae and T. hyaennae (two tapeworm species).

== Genetics and evolution ==
The giant eland has 31 male chromosomes and 32 female chromosomes. In a 2008 phylogenomic study of spiral-horned antelopes, chromosomal similarities were observed between cattle (Bos taurus) and eight species of spiral-horned antelopes, namely: nyala (Tragelaphus angasii), lesser kudu (T. imberbis), bongo (T. eurycerus), bushbuck (T. scriptus), greater kudu (T. strepsiceros), sitatunga (T. spekei), giant eland and common eland (T. oryx). It was found that chromosomes involved in centric fusions in these species used a complete set of cattle painting probes generated by laser microdissection. The study confirmed the presence of the chromosome translocation known as Robertsonian translocation (1;29), a widespread evolutionary marker common to all known tragelaphid species.

An accidental mating between a male giant eland and a female kudu produced a male offspring, but it was azoospermic. Analysis showed that it completely lacked germ cells, which produce gametes. Still, the hybrid had a strong male scent and exhibited male behaviour. Chromosomal examination showed that chromosomes 1, 3, 5, 9, and 11 differed from the parental karyotypes. Notable mixed inherited traits were pointed ears like the eland's, but a bit widened like kudu's. The tail was half the length of that of an eland with a tuft of hair at the end as in kudu.

Previous genetic studies of African savanna ungulates revealed the presence of a long-standing Pleistocene refugium in eastern and southern Africa, which also includes the giant eland. The common eland and giant eland have been estimated to have diverged about 1.6 million years ago.

== Habitat and distribution ==
Giant elands live in the broad-leafed savanna, woodlands, and glades of central and western Africa, which correspond to the two subspecies. They also live in forests as well as on the fringes of deserts. The giant elands can also live in deserts, as they produce very dry dung. They are found in South Sudan and Central African Republic into northern Cameroon and southern Chad.

They inhabit places near hilly or rocky landscapes and those with water sources nearby. Science author Jonathan Kingdon had thought the giant elands lived only in woodlands of Isoberlinia doka, an African hardwood tree. The giant eland is adapted to these broad-leafed, deciduous Isoberlinia woodlands. Recent studies proved that they also inhabit woodlands with trees of the genera Terminalia, Combretum, and Afzelia.

In the past, giant elands occurred throughout the relatively narrow belt of savanna woodland that extends across West and Central Africa from Senegal to the Nile. Today they are conserved in national parks and reserves, and occur mostly in Senegal. The western giant eland is largely restricted to Niokolo-Koba National Park in Senegal. The eastern giant eland is found in several reserves, for example in Bénoué National Park, Faro National Park and Bouba Njida National Park in Cameroon and in Manovo-Gounda St. Floris National Park in the Central African Republic. They are also kept in captivity.

== Ecology and behaviour ==
Primarily nocturnal, giant elands have large home ranges and seasonal migration patterns. They form separate groups of males and of females and juveniles. Adult males mainly remain alone, and often spend time with females for an hour to a week. A gregarious species, giant eland herds usually consist of 15–25 animals (sometimes even more) and do not disband during the wet season, suggesting that social rather than ecological factors are responsible for herding. During the day, herds often rest in sheltered areas. As many other animals do, giant elands scrape mineral lick sites with the help of horns to loosen soil.

Giant elands are alert and wary, making them difficult to approach and observe or to hunt. If a bull senses danger, he will give deep-throated barks while leaving the herd, repeating the process until the whole herd is aware of the danger. Giant elands can move quickly, running at over 70 km/h (43 mph), and despite their size are exceptional jumpers, easily clearing heights of 1.5 m (4.9 ft). Their primary predators are the lion, nile crocodile and spotted hyena, while young, sickly and a rare adult may be vulnerable to leopards, cheetahs and African wild dogs. Due to their large size, they prove a good meal for the predators. However, they are not easily taken by any predator, especially the heavier and larger horned bulls which can be a dangerous adversary even for a lion pride.

=== Diet ===
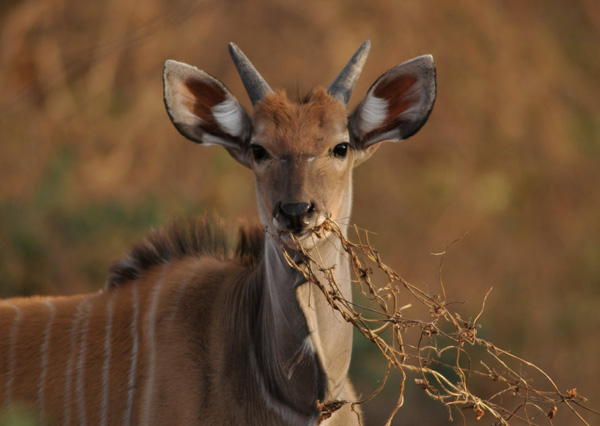
The giant eland is a herbivore.

Primarily a herbivore, the giant eland eats grasses and foliage, as well as other parts of a plant. In the rainy season, they browse in herds and feed on grasses. They can eat coarse, dry grass and weeds if nothing else is available. They eat fruits too, such as plums. A study in South Africa showed that an eland's diet consists of 75% shrubs and 25% grasses, with highly varying proportions. They often use their long horns to break off branches.

As they need a regular intake of water in their diet, they prefer living in places with a nearby water source. However, some adaptations they possess help them to survive even in the lack of water by maintaining a sufficient quantity of it in their body. They produce very dry dung compared to domestic cattle. In deserts, they can get their required water from the moisture of succulent plants. Another way in which they conserve water is by resting in the day and feeding at night, so that they minimize the water quantity required to cool themselves.

Several studies have investigated the eland's diet. A study of giant elands in the Bandia Natural reserve in Senegal revealed that the most important and most preferred plants were various species of Acacia, Terminalia and Combretum, along with Azadirachta indica, Daniellia oliveri, Gymnosporia senegalensis, Philenoptera laxiflora (syn. Lonchocarpus laxiflorus), Prosopis africana, Pterocarpus erinaceus, Saba senegalensis and pods of Piliostigma thonningii. Another study in Sudan showed that western giant elands preferred Cassia tora, which was the most abundant legume in the region.

In 2010, histological analysis of the feces of South African western giant elands was done in the Niokolo-Koba National Park and in the Bandia National Reserve. In both studies leaves, shoots of woody plants, and fruits were found to be the three major components. The other components that appeared in minor proportions were forbs and grasses, generally below five percent of the mean fecal volume. They were seen eating most foliage from Boscia angustifolia, Grewia bicolor, Hymenocardia acida, and Ziziphus mauritiana, and the fruits of Acacia and Strychnos spinosa. In the Bandia Reserve, differences in diet were marked among age classes. The conclusions were that in the dry season the eland was a pure browser, consuming grasses in small amounts.

=== Reproduction ===
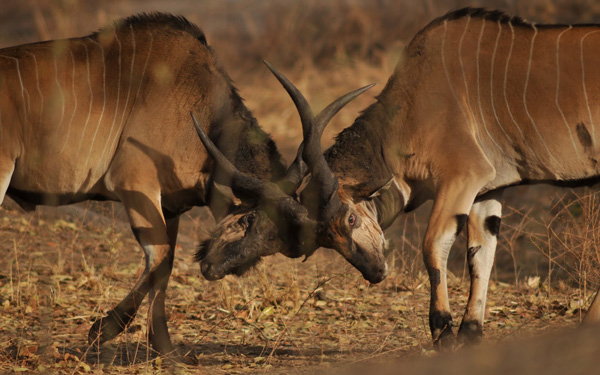
Two males fighting for dominance

Mating occurs throughout the year, but peaks in the wet season. Females reach sexual maturity at about two years, and males at four to five years. A female can remain in estrus for three days, and the estrous cycle is 21–26 days long. As in all antelopes, mating occurs at a time of food abundance. In some areas distinct breeding seasons exist. In southern Africa, females have been seen giving birth from August to October, and are joined by the males from late October to January. In Zambia calves are born in July and August.

Fights occur for dominance, in which the bulls lock horns and try to twist the necks of their opponents. As an act during rut, the males rub their foreheads in fresh urine or mud. They also use their horns to thresh and throw loose earth on themselves. The horns of older males get worn out due to rubbing them on tree barks. Expressions of anger are not typically observed. Dominant males may mate with multiple females. The courtship is brief, consisting of a penetration and one ejaculatory thrust.

After the courtship, the gestational period begins, which is of nine months duration. The delivery usually takes place in the night, after which the mother ingests the afterbirth. Generally one calf is delivered, and it remains with its mother for six months. Lactation can last for four to five months. After the first six months the young eland might join a group of other juveniles.

A Senegalese study focused on the suckling behaviour of giant eland and common eland calves about one to five months old determined that suckling bouts increased with the age of the calves. No other change occurred in the farmed common eland calves, but in the giant eland calves, the males were found to suckle more than female ones and shorter suckling bouts were marked in primiparous mothers than multiparous ones. The results suggest that Derby elands that lived in their natural habitat adjusted their maternal behaviour so as to be able to readily maintain a vigilant lookout for predators and other similar risks. In contrast, the farmed common elands behaved as in the conditions of captivity, without predators.

== Populations ==
The eastern giant eland ranged from Nigeria, through Cameroon, Chad, the Central African Republic, and the Democratic Republic of the Congo (formerly Zaire) to Sudan and Uganda in 1980. But the rinderpest outbreak (1983–1984) caused a devastating 60–80% decline in the populations. The eastern giant eland is still found in extensive areas, though it has a decreasing population trend. Because of this, it is listed as 'Vulnerable' by the IUCN. It has many uninhabited habitats that are not expected to be occupied for human settlement, particularly in northern and eastern Central African Republic and south-western Sudan, where their population has notably increased. According to Rod East, 15,000 eastern giant elands existed as of 1999, of which 12,500 are in Central African Republic. The remaining areas are often disturbed by wars and conflicts—activities that can lead to a rapid decline in the eastern giant eland's numbers if not controlled.

The western giant eland is in a more dangerous situation, being listed as 'Critically Endangered' by the IUCN. Today they mostly occur in Senegal. In 1990, populations were about 1000, of which 700 to 800 were found in the Niokolo-Koba National Park and the rest in the region around the Falémé River. As of 2008, a population of less than 200 individuals occur there, and only a few elands exist in neighboring countries.

A study of the long-term conservation strategy of the western giant eland was done in the Bandia and Fathala reserves, using demographic and pedigree data based on continuous monitoring of reproduction during 2000 to 2009. In 2009, the semi-captive population was 54 individuals (26 males, 28 females). The female breeding probability was 84%, and the annual population growth was 1.36. With more population, the elands were divided into five groups for observation. Although the mean interbreeding level became 0.119, a potential gene diversity (GD) of 92% was retained. The authors concluded that with the introduction of new founders, the GD could be greatly improved in the next 100 years, and suggested that with proper management of the semi-captive population, the numbers of the western giant eland could be increased.

== Interaction with humans ==
=== Threats and conservation ===
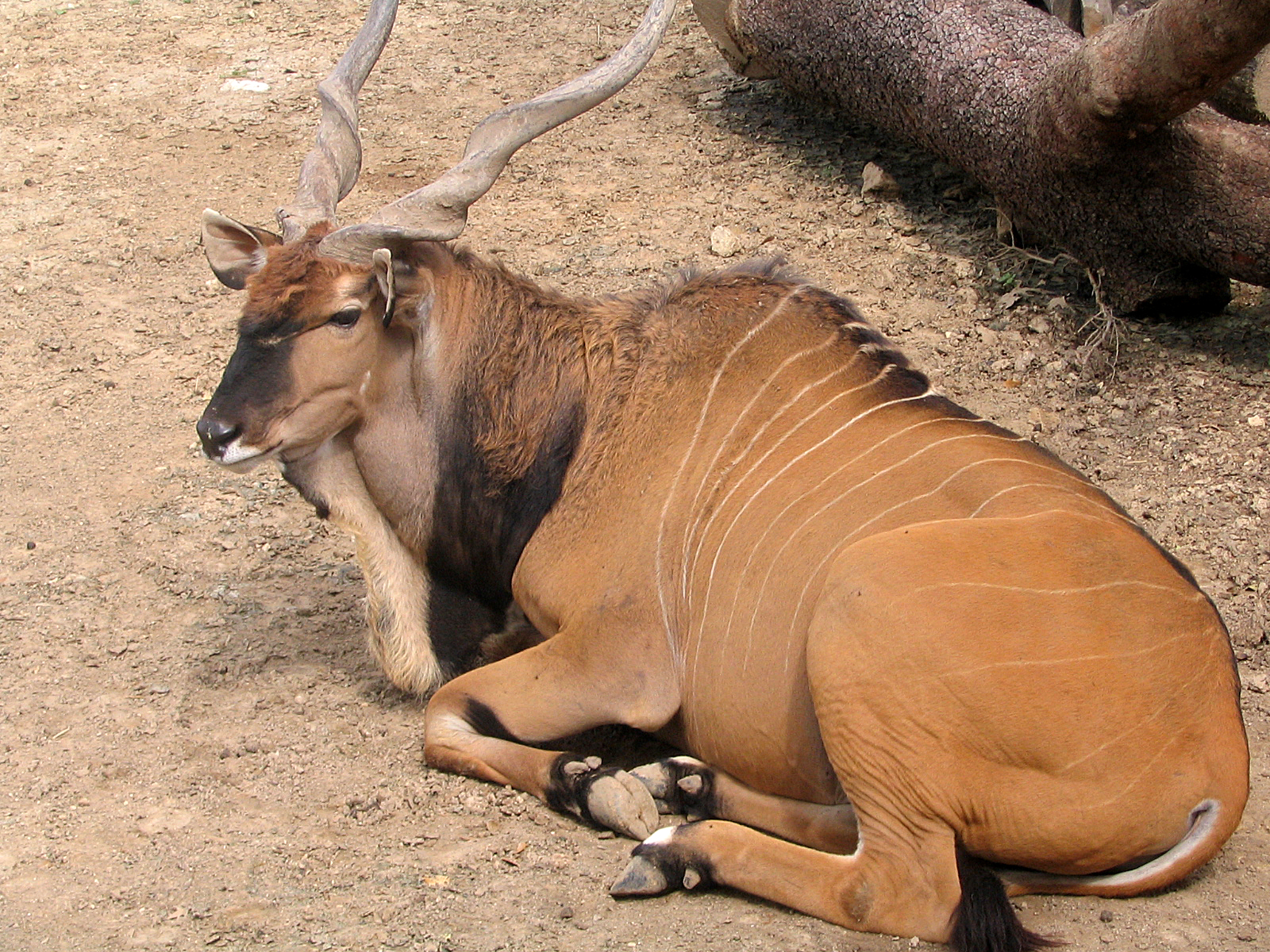
At the Houston Zoo

The major threats to the western giant eland population are overhunting for its rich meat and habitat destruction caused by the expansion of human and livestock populations. The eastern giant eland is also depleting for similar reasons, and natural causes like continued droughts and competition from domestic animals are contributing to the reduction in numbers. Populations of the eastern giant eland had already gone down due to the rinderpest attacks. The situation was worse during World War II and other civil wars and political conflicts that harmed their natural habitats.

The giant eland is already extirpated in The Gambia, Ghana, Ivory Coast, and Togo. The western giant eland was once reported in Togo, but is believed to have been confused with the bongo (Tragalephaus eurycerus). In 1970, it was reported eliminated in Uganda, during military operations. Its presence is uncertain in Guinea-Bissau and Nigeria.

Today the western giant eland is conserved in the Niokolo-Koba National Park and the Faheme Hunting Zone in Senegal. Field studies have proven that the Niokolo-Koba National Park is ecologically suitable for the giant eland. As observed in the 2000 census of the park, the number of deaths in a decade were only 90 to 150.

The eastern giant eland is conserved in the Faro National Park, Bénoué National Park, Bouba Njida National Park, Bamingui-Bangoran National Park and Manovo-Gounda St. Floris National Park. They are bred in captivity in the Bandia Reserve and Fathala Reserve in Senegal, and at White Oak Conservation in Yulee, Florida, United States. Eland born at White Oak have been sent to other countries, including Costa Rica and South Africa, to initiate breeding programs.

=== Uses ===
Giant elands give large quantities of tender meat and high-quality hides even if fed a low-quality diet. These are game animals and are also hunted for trophies. Their milk is comparatively richer in proteins and milkfat than dairy cows, which may be an explanation for the quick growth of eland calves. Eland's milk has about triple the fat content and twice the protein of a dairy cow's milk. Its docility and profitable characteristics have made it a target of domestication in Africa and Russia and has also resulted in hunting.

Many people prefer to tame and raise eland rather than cattle due to their numerous benefits. Elands can survive on scarce water, which is a great advantage over domestic cattle. They can also eat coarse grasses, and can even manage to ingest some poisonous plants that can prove fatal for cattle. They are also immune to some diseases to which cattle may succumb.
