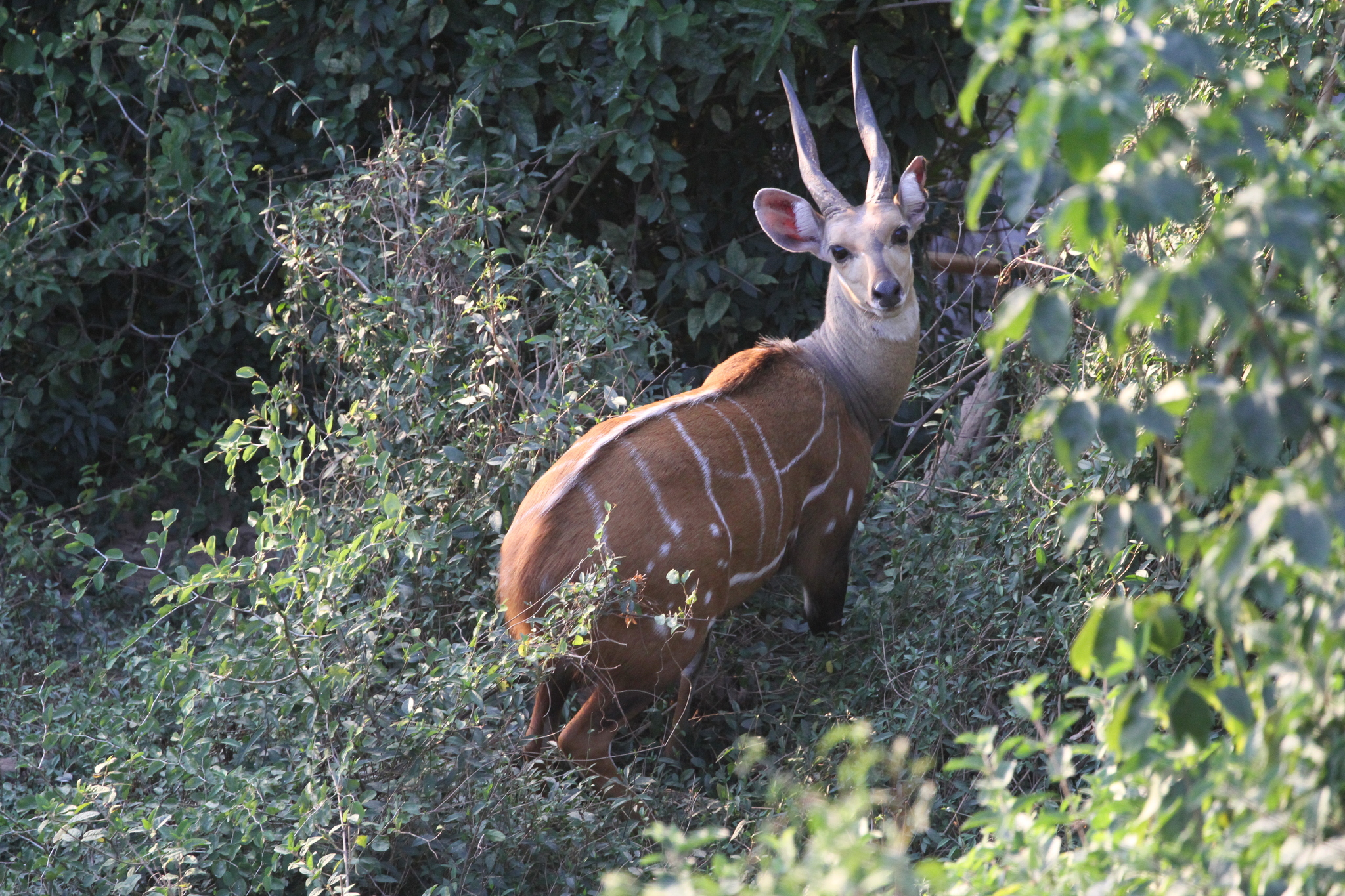
- Male
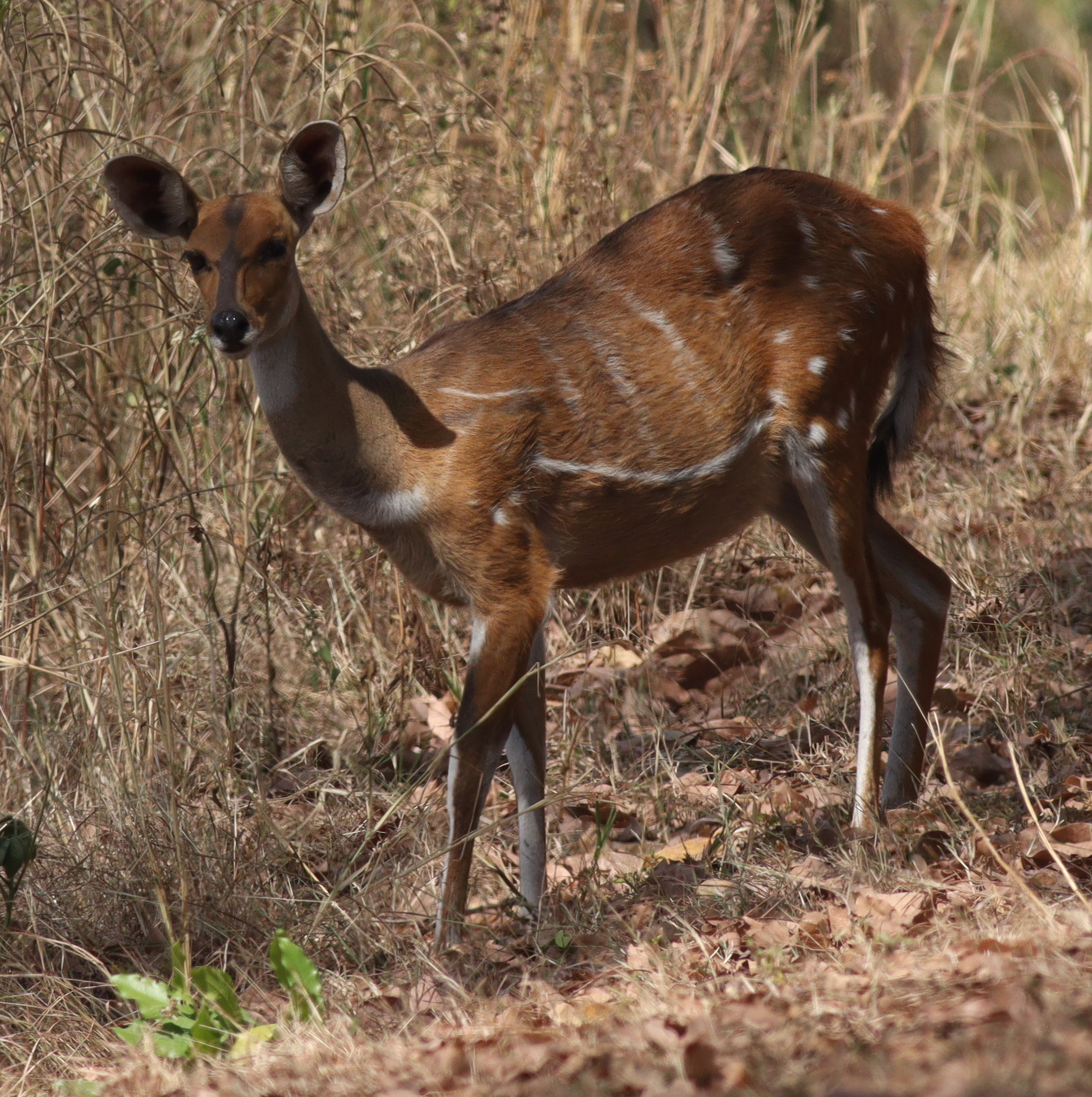
- Female

Conservation status
- Least Concern (IUCN 3.1)

Scientific classification
- Kingdom: Animalia
- Phylum: Chordata
- Class: Mammalia
- Order: Artiodactyla
- Family: Bovidae
- Subfamily: Bovinae
- Genus: Tragelaphus
- Subgenus: Tragelaphus
- Species: T. scriptus

Binomial name
- Tragelaphus scriptus (Pallas, 1766)

= Harnessed bushbuck =

Species of mammal

The harnessed bushbuck (Tragelaphus scriptus) or northern bushbuck, is a medium-sized antelope, widespread in sub-Saharan-Africa. The harnessed bushbuck species has been separated from the Cape bushbuck, a southern and eastern species.

== Taxonomy ==
- - - - - - - Taurotragus
              - Giant eland
              - Common eland
            - - Strepsiceros
                Greater kudu
              - Tragelaphus
                - Mountain nyala
                - - - - Bongo
                      - Sitatunga
                    - - - - Cape bushbuck
                          - Harnessed bushbuck
          - Nyala
            Lowland nyala
        - Ammelaphus
          Lesser kudu

Phylogenetic relationships of the mountain nyala from combined analysis of all molecular data (Willows-Munro et.al. 2005). Subgenera (stem labels) per MDD.

In a 2007 study, 19 genetically-based groupings were found, some of which do not correspond to previously described subspecies; eight of these were grouped under the nominate taxon. Former subspecies included as synonyms to the nominate taxon are phaleratus, bor and dodingae.

Hassanin et al. (2018) found an mtDNA/nuclear DNA discordance between scriptus and sylvaticus clades. Their phylogenetic analyses showed that the scriptus (northern) lineage is a sister-group of sylvaticus (southern) lineage in the nuclear tree, whereas it has nyala (Tragelaphus angasii) haplotypes in the mitochondrial tree. They also found different karyotypes (chromosome numbers and arrangements), with those of scriptus deriving from the nyala. They concluded that scriptus (but not sylvaticus) had hybridized with an "extinct species closely related to T. angasii" in ancient times; and that "the division into two bushbuck species is supported by the analyses of nuclear markers and by the karyotype...".

As the first of the bushbucks to be described by Pallas in 1766 as Antilope scripta from Senegal, it retains the original species name for the bushbuck, corrected for gender.

== Description ==
Bushbucks in general are smaller are than other tragelaphines, with a mainly red or yellow-brown ground color. According to Moodley et al., the males of the West African population are more often striped than those in East or Southern Africa, although bushbucks with striping occur throughout the range.

== Distribution ==
The nominate taxon occurs in Senegal, Gambia, Guinea, Sierra Leone, Ghana and in the Niger Basin in Nigeria as far east as the Cross River, south of the Bamenda Highlands through Cameroon, Chad, the Central African Republic to the Nile in South Sudan and northern Uganda, Gabon, Republic of the Congo, Democratic Republic of the Congo to northern Angola.

== Ecology ==
It is common across its broad geographic distribution and is found in wooded savannas, forest-savanna mosaics, rainforests, in montane forests and semi-arid zones. It does not occur in the deep rainforests of the central Congo Basin.

=== Predation by chimpanzees ===
In Fongoli, Senegal, western chimpanzees of both sexes occasionally hunt bushbucks, preferring fawns when given the chance.
