= Hircocervus =

Legendary creature

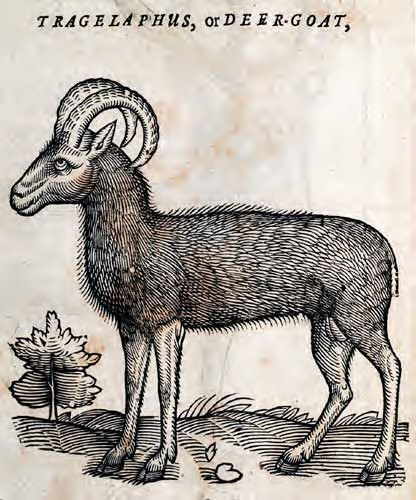
Woodcut of the tragelaph from the book The History of Four-footed Beasts and Serpents by Edward Topsell.

The hircocervus (Latin: hircus, "billy goat" + cervus, "stag") or tragelaph (Greek: τράγος, romanized: tragos, "billy goat" + έλαφος, elaphos, "stag"), also known as a goat-stag, was a legendary creature imagined to be half-goat, half-stag.

== Origins ==
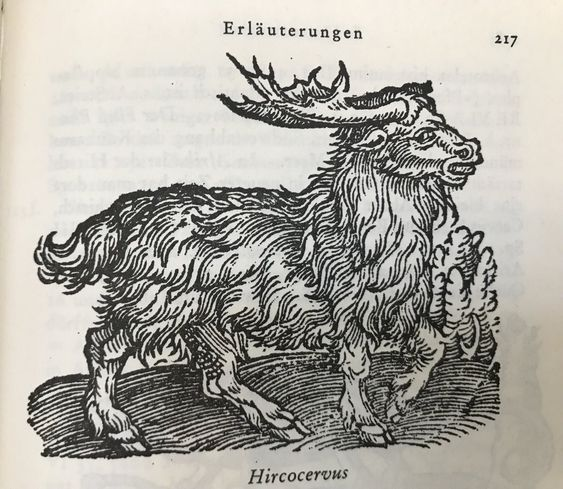
Hircocervus from Naturalis Historiae by Pliny the Elder.

In Plato's Republic, Socrates speaks of his own image-making as similar to that of painters who paint goat-stags, combining the features of different things together (488a).

In his work De Interpretatione, Aristotle utilized the idea of a fabulous goat-stag to express the philosophical concept of something that is describable even though it does not really exist. His Greek "τραγέλαφος" was rendered into Latin "hircocervus" by Boethius.

Aristotle returned to this in the Posterior Analytics to argue that, though the word is definable, there can be no definition of the species as it has no members. He also uses the tragelaphos together with the Sphinx in the Physics to illustrate the point that a non-existent creature has no spatial location. On the other hand, Diodorus Siculus treats the tragelaphos as an existing animal, and there are references in Greek literature to other hybrid creatures such as the hippelaphos (horse-stag).

The word hircocervus first appears in the English language in a medieval manuscript dating from 1398 (now at the Bodleian Library).

== In culture ==
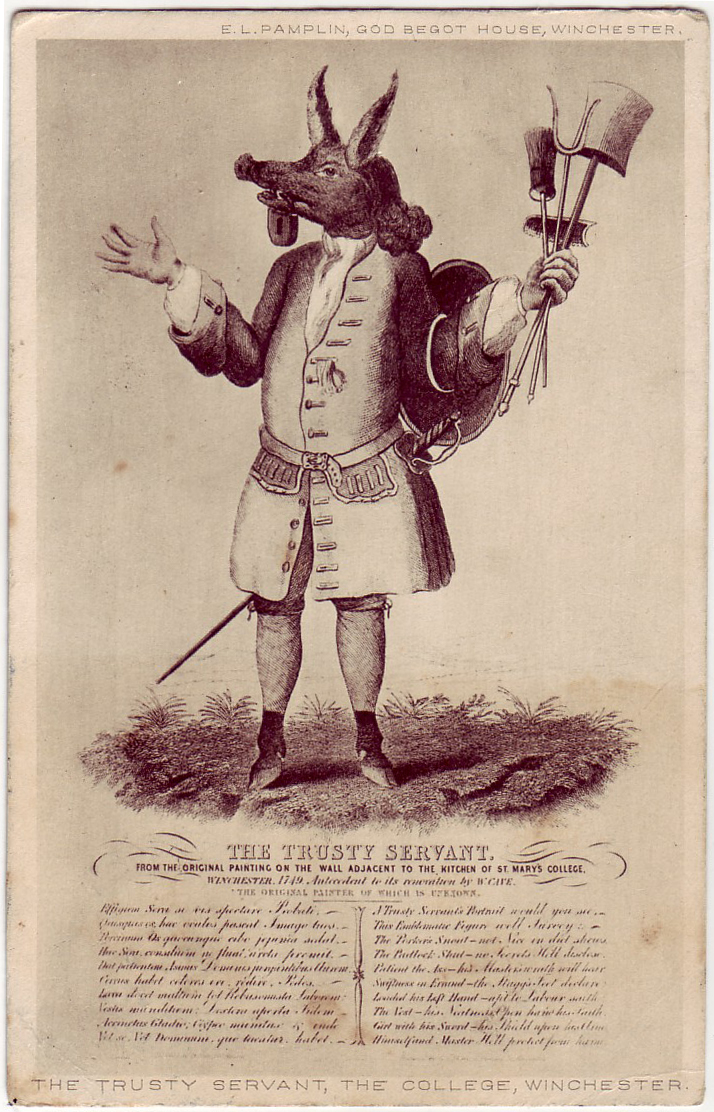
19th century engraved reproduction of "The Trusty Servant"

Rabbinic literature refers to an animal called a koy which is halfway between domesticated and wild species of quadruped, and debates how far it is subject to the laws governing each category. Scholars are divided on whether the rabbis believed the koy to be a real creature or an imaginary example used for a hypothetical discussion.

Martin Luther uses the term "tragelaphus" in his Theses Against the Antinomians (1540, Sixth Set) to describe "a law that does not condemn". Luther is stating that one can imagine a law from God that only instructs or teaches without threatening and condemning human sin. However, Luther claims that such a law, often sought by theologians throughout Christian history, does not actually exist.

The Trusty Servant, depicted in a painting at Winchester College, was described as a Hircocervus by Arthur Cleveland Coxe, though this is not strictly accurate as the Trusty Servant contains no part of a goat but rather parts of a man, a hog and a donkey.

Umberto Eco refers to a hircocervus in his novel The Island of the Day Before, as does Italo Calvino in Invisible Cities.

Italian Marxist philosopher Antonio Gramsci uses the term "hircocervus" to describe parliamentary political alliances between socialist parties and parties sympathetic to the state and capitalism. The dual party of socialists and capitalists "thus becomes a hircocervus, a historical monster devoid of will or particular aims, concerned only with its possession of the state."
