= Itigi–Sumbu thicket =

Ecoregion in eastern Africa

Itigi-Sumbu thicket
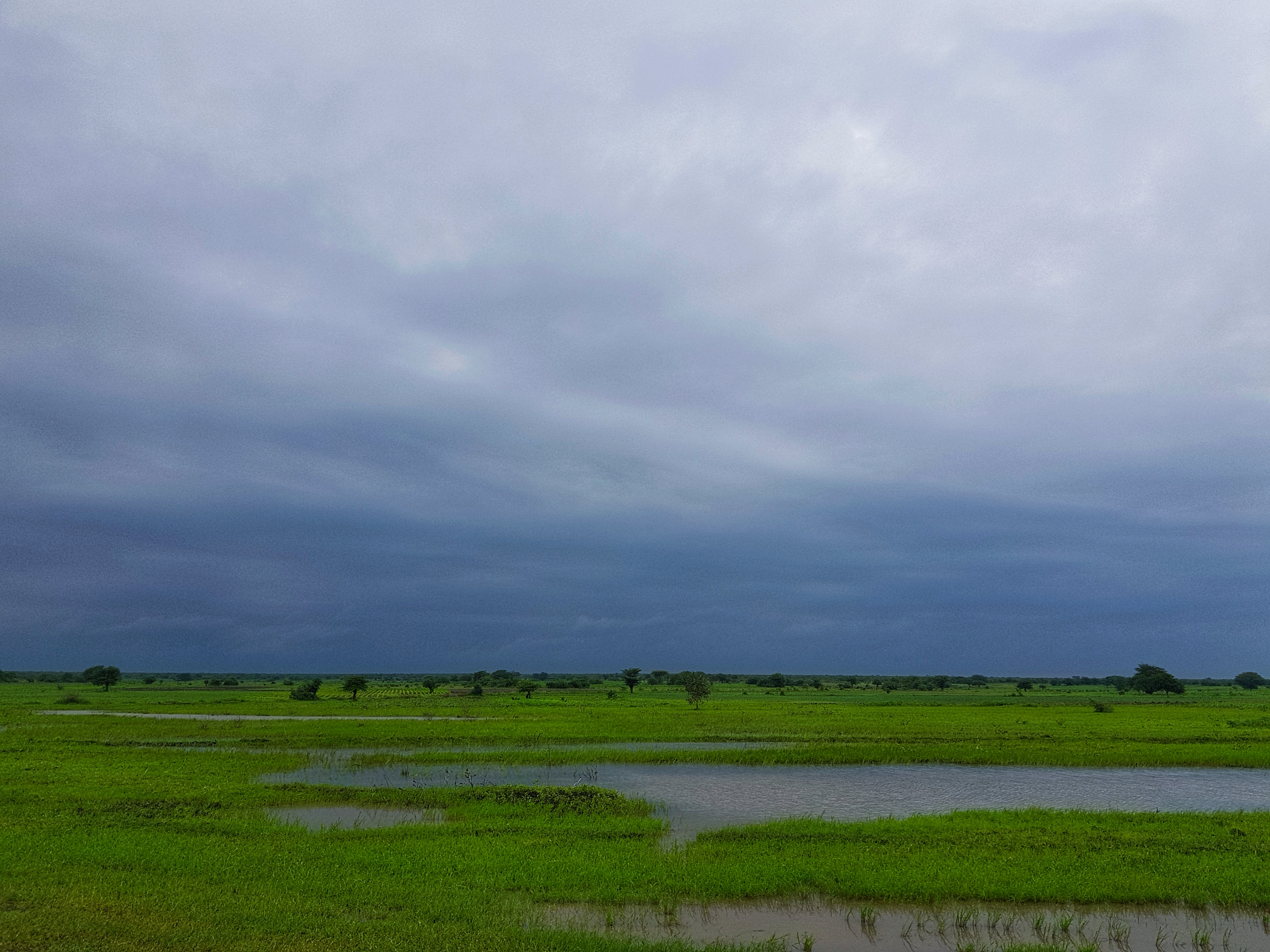
- Landscape near Itigi, Tanzania

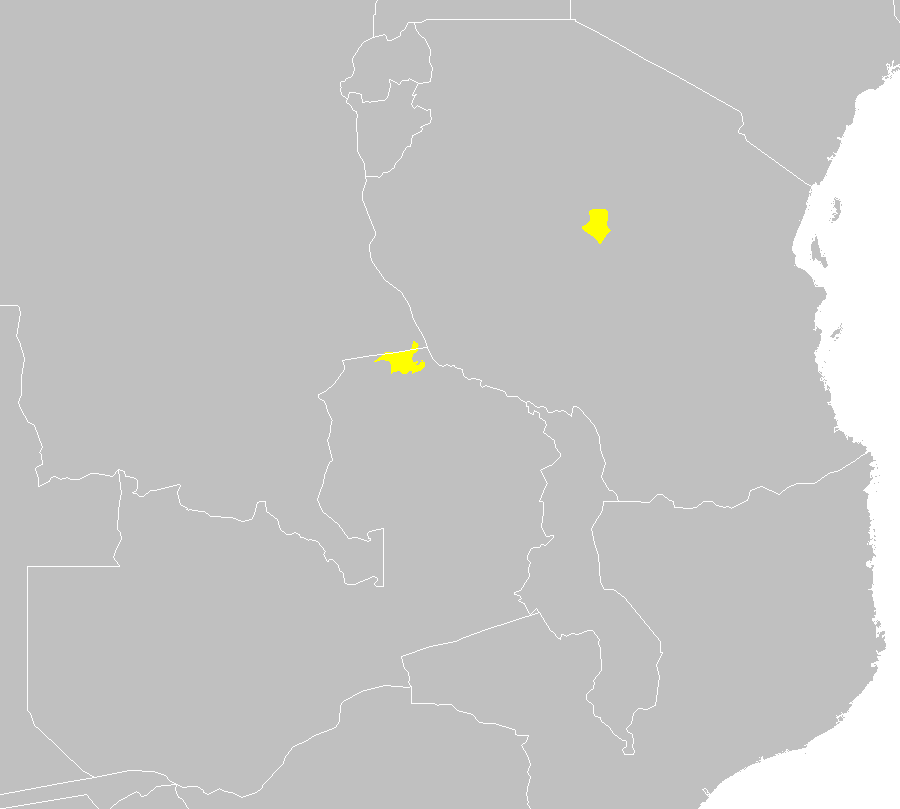
- Location of the Itigi-Sumbu thicket ecoregion

Ecology
- Realm: Afrotropical
- Biome: tropical and subtropical grasslands, savannas, and shrublands
- Borders: Central Zambezian miombo woodlands; Southern Acacia-Commiphora bushlands and thickets

Geography
- Area: 10,997 km^{2} (4,246 mi^{2})
- Countries: Tanzania; Zambia; Democratic Republic of the Congo
- Coordinates: 5.55°S 34.45°E

Conservation
- Conservation status: Critical/endangered
- Protected: 3,797 km^{2} (1,466 sq mi) (35%)

The Itigi-Sumbu thicket is an ecoregion consisting of two small areas of thick shrubland in Tanzania, Zambia and the adjacent Democratic Republic of the Congo, in East Africa. The floral community of dense deciduous brush is unique, with many endemic species, and almost no transition zone between it and the surrounding dry miombo woodlands. The distinctive nature of this small region is partly due to its setting on dry alluvial soil over a hard duricrust, while the surrounding areas are rocky hills and plateaus.

== Location and description ==
The thickets are found in the flatland between Lake Mweru Wantipa and Lake Tanganyika in Zambia (between 950 and 1,200 m (3,120 and 3,940 ft) above sea level), and near the town of Itigi in the Itigi District of Tanzania. The climate consists of a cool dry season from May to August, a hot dry season from August to November, and a rainy season from November to April.

== Climate ==
The climate of the ecoregion is hot semi-arid (Köppen climate classification (BSh)). This climate is characteristic of steppes, with hot summers and cool or mild winters, and minimal precipitation. The dry season (May to October) averages 20–27 °C (68–81 °F), with the wet season rising above 30 °C (86 °F). The rainy season is November to April. Rainfall differs in the two different sites of this ecoregion, averaging 1,400 mm (55 in) per year in the Zambian site, but less than 500 mm (20 in) per year in the Tanzanian site.

== Flora ==
The extremely dense, impenetrable Itigi deciduous thicket is a unique mixture of over 100 species of woody shrubs 3 to 5 metres (9.8 to 16.4 ft) high. Characteristic species are two species of Baphia (Baphia burttii and Baphia massaiensis), Bussea massaiensis, Burttia prunoides, Combretum celastroides (a type of bushwillow), Grewia burttii, Pseudoprosopsis fischeri, and Tapiphyllum floribundum.

== Fauna ==
Traditionally a habitat of elephant and black rhino, the area is vulnerable to poaching and rhinos have been eradicated from the area. The thickets are also home to three endemic reptiles – the Urungu beaked snake (Rhinotyphlops gracilis), four-fingered skink (Sepsina tetradactyla), and Johnston's long-tailed lizard (Latastia johnstonii).

== Threats and preservation ==
The thickets are being extensively cleared for firewood and for cultivation as the populations of the two countries grow, with 50% gone in Tanzania (which is unprotected) and 70% in Zambia, which does have some protection in the Mweru Wantipa National Park. The largest blocks of thicket remain on the northern shores of Lake Mweru Wantipa and in the eastern portion of the Zambian Itigi thicket.

A 2017 assessment found that 3,797 km^{2} (1,466 sq mi), or 35%, of the ecoregion is in protected areas. Protected areas include:

- Mweru Wantipa National Park,
- Nsumbu National Park, and
- Kaputa Game Management Area in Zambia.
