= Itigi District =

District in Singida, Tanzania

- District
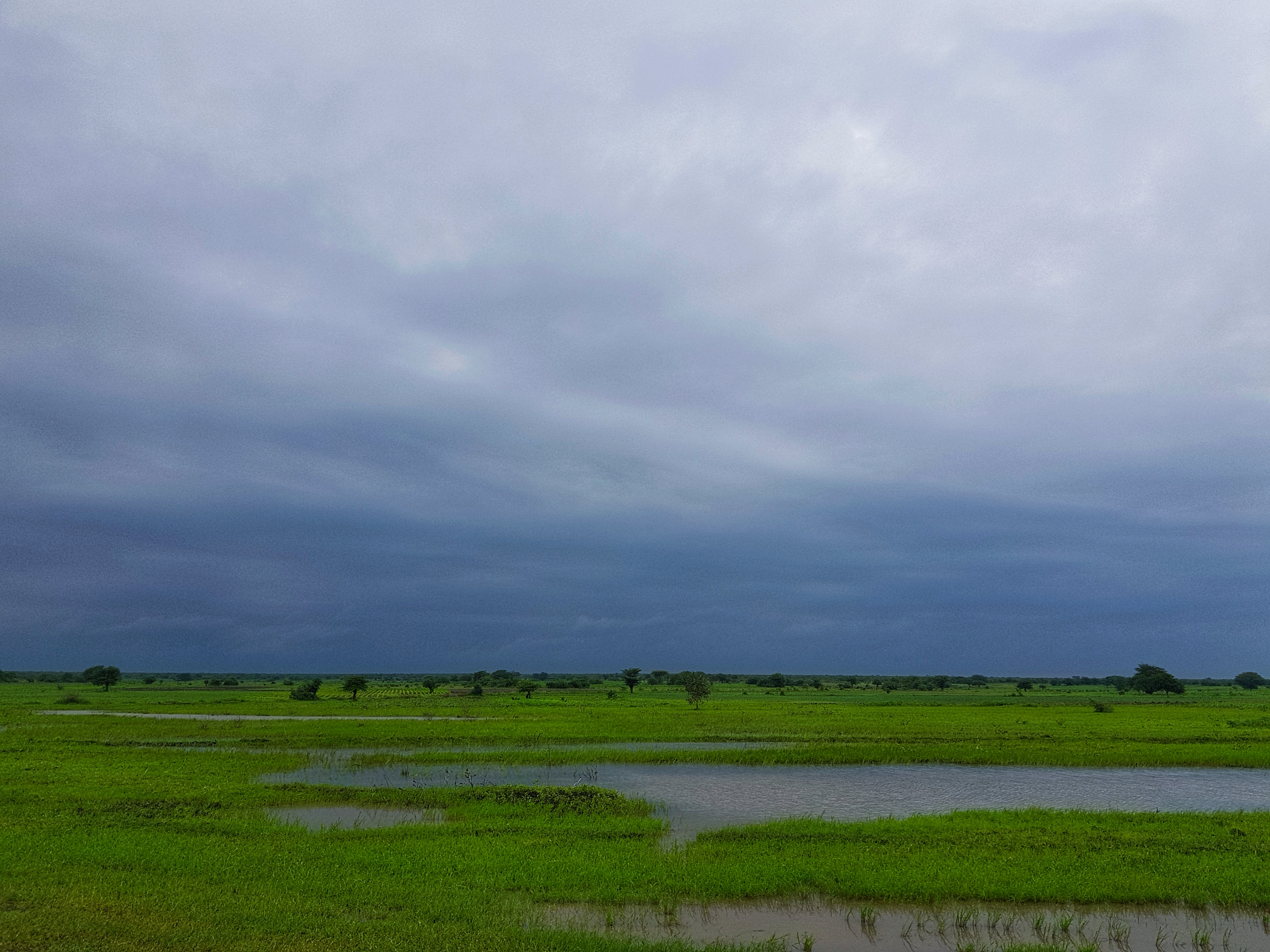
- Clouds over Itigi, Tanzania

- Location of Itigi District within the Singida Region
- Coordinates: 5.7058°S 34.4927°E
- Country: Tanzania
- Region: Singida Region
- District: Itigi District
- Established: 2015
- Headquarters: Itigi

Government
  - Type: Council
  - Chairman: Hussein I. Simba
  - Director: John K. Mgalula

Area
  - Total: 17,436.2 km^{2} (6,732.2 sq mi)

Population (2022)
  - Total: 279,069
  - Density: 16.0052/km^{2} (41.4531/sq mi)
- Time zone: EAT
- Postcode: 43xxx
- Area code: 026
- Website: District Website

Itigi District is a district council in the Singida Region of central Tanzania established in 2015. The district lies in the south-western portion of the Singida Region with 279,069 people and encompasses a large area mostly made up of protected game reserves.

== History ==
The district was created by separation of the town of Itigi and its division from the Manyoni District on the 25th of September, 2015.

== Geography ==
North of the district is the Ikungi District, east is the Manyoni District, south is the Chunya District of the Mbeya Region, and to the west are the Uyui and Sikonge Districts of the Tabora Region. The district covers an area of 17,436.2 square kilometres (6,732.2 sq mi), while the region lies on a large plateau at altitudes of 1,200 metres (3,900 ft) to 1,500 metres (4,900 ft) with cliffs of 180 metres (590 ft) encircling most of the region at its borders.

=== Climate ===
The district's climate is hot semi-arid with the BSh Koppen-Geiger system classification. The average temperature is 21.6 °C (70.9 °F) with an average rainfall of 632 millimetres (24.9 in).

=== Flora and fauna ===
In the district the Rungwa Game Reserve with the other Kizigo and Muhesi game reserves make up the Rungwa-Kizigo-Muhesi ecosystem and covers an area of 17,340 square kilometres (6,700 sq mi) in Itigi and neighboring districts. With the connected Ruaha National Park, of 20,226 km^{2} (7,809 sq mi) as well as its other connected protected areas mostly in the Iringa Region, the Ruaha-Rungwa protected area covers around 45,000 km^{2} (17,000 sq mi).

The Itigi–Sumbu thicket is two small patches of isolated thickets located in the Itigi District of Tanzania, and in Zambia near Lake Mweru Wantipa and Lake Tanganyika.

=== Administrative ===
The district has one division, 13 wards, 39 villages, and 171 hamlets.

Wards (2016 Population)

- Aghondi (6,000)
- Idodyandole (12,291)
- Ipande (11,017)
- Itigi (6,134)
- Itigi Majengo (12,431)
- Kalangali (5,241)
- Kitaraka (10,656)
- Mgandu (15,129)
- Mitundu (20,086)
- Mwamagembe (7,091)
- Rungwa (2,424)
- Sanjaranda (9,687)
- Tambukareli (5,331)

== Demographics ==
In 2016 the Tanzania National Bureau of Statistics report there were 123,515 people in the district, from 112,565 in 2012. People of the district are of the tribes of Wagogo, Waturu, Wanyaturu, Wasukuma, Wanyamwezi, and Wakimbu.

== Economy ==
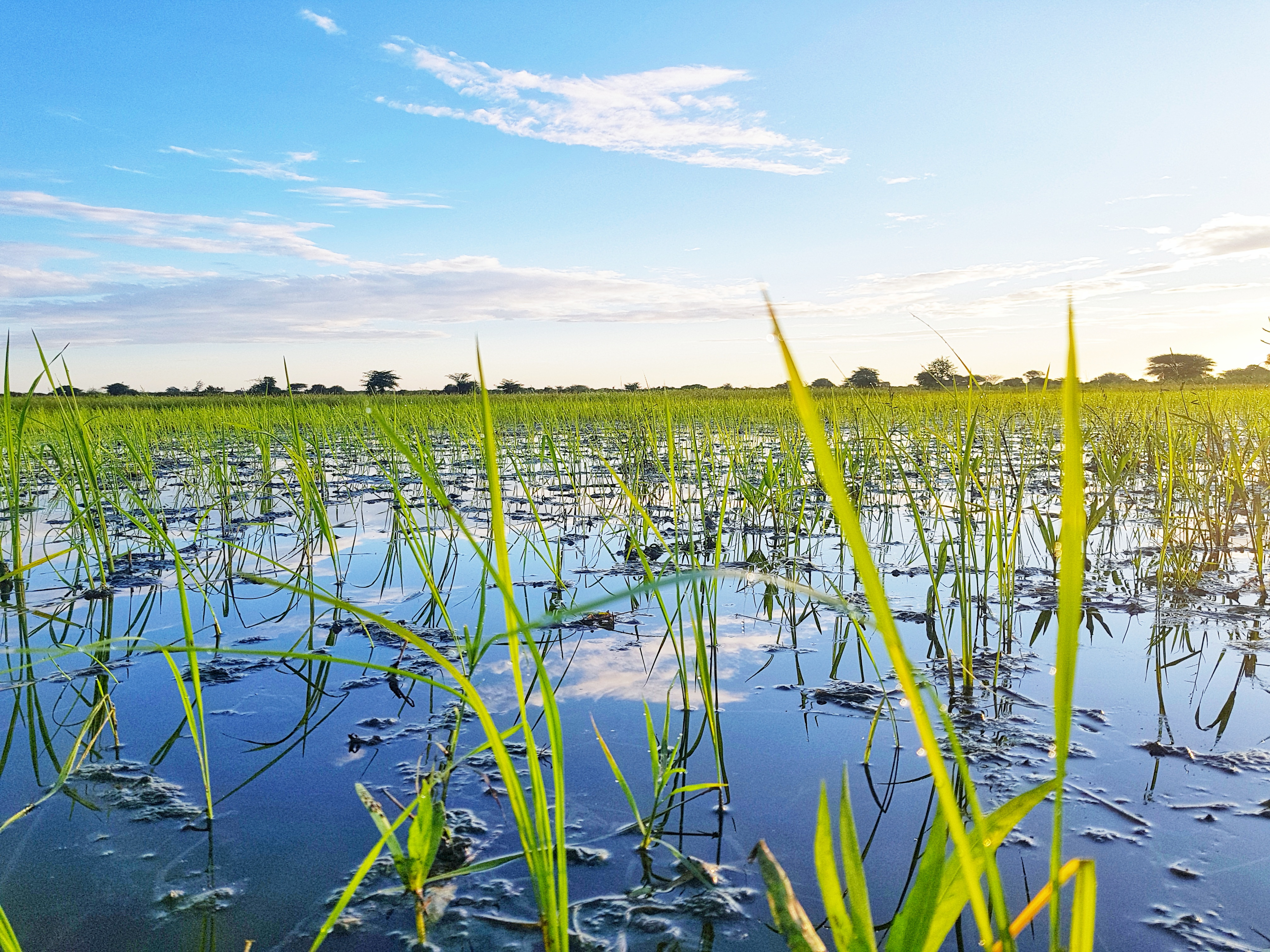
Rice at plantation at Itigi Tanzania

Agriculture and livestock raising are the primary economic activities, along with trade, beekeeping and gypsum mining.

In the 2018/19 year the Itigi District produced 16,807 metric tons of maize, 2,466.5 tonnes of sorghum, 7,027 tonnes of sweet potatoes, and 2,295 tonnes of finger millet. The Mgandu Ward has 300 ha (740 acres) of potential irrigation land under the Itagata Irrigation Scheme for paddy.

For grazing, the district has 94,222 ha (232,830 acres) with 61,900 ha (153,000 acres) being used, and a small amount of 839 ha (2,070 acres) infected with Tsetse fly. In 2019 the Itigi had 108,020 cattle, 62,403 chickens, 857 ducks, 51,314 goats, 1,155 pigs, and 13,637 sheep as livestock.

== Education ==
There are 67 primary schools, and 12 secondary schools in the district. In 2019, 7 of the secondary schools had electricity, of which 3 are connected to the grid and 4 use solar power.

== Health ==
There are two health centers, and 18 clinics in the district. In 2018, 42% of the population had access to clean water.

== Infrastructure ==
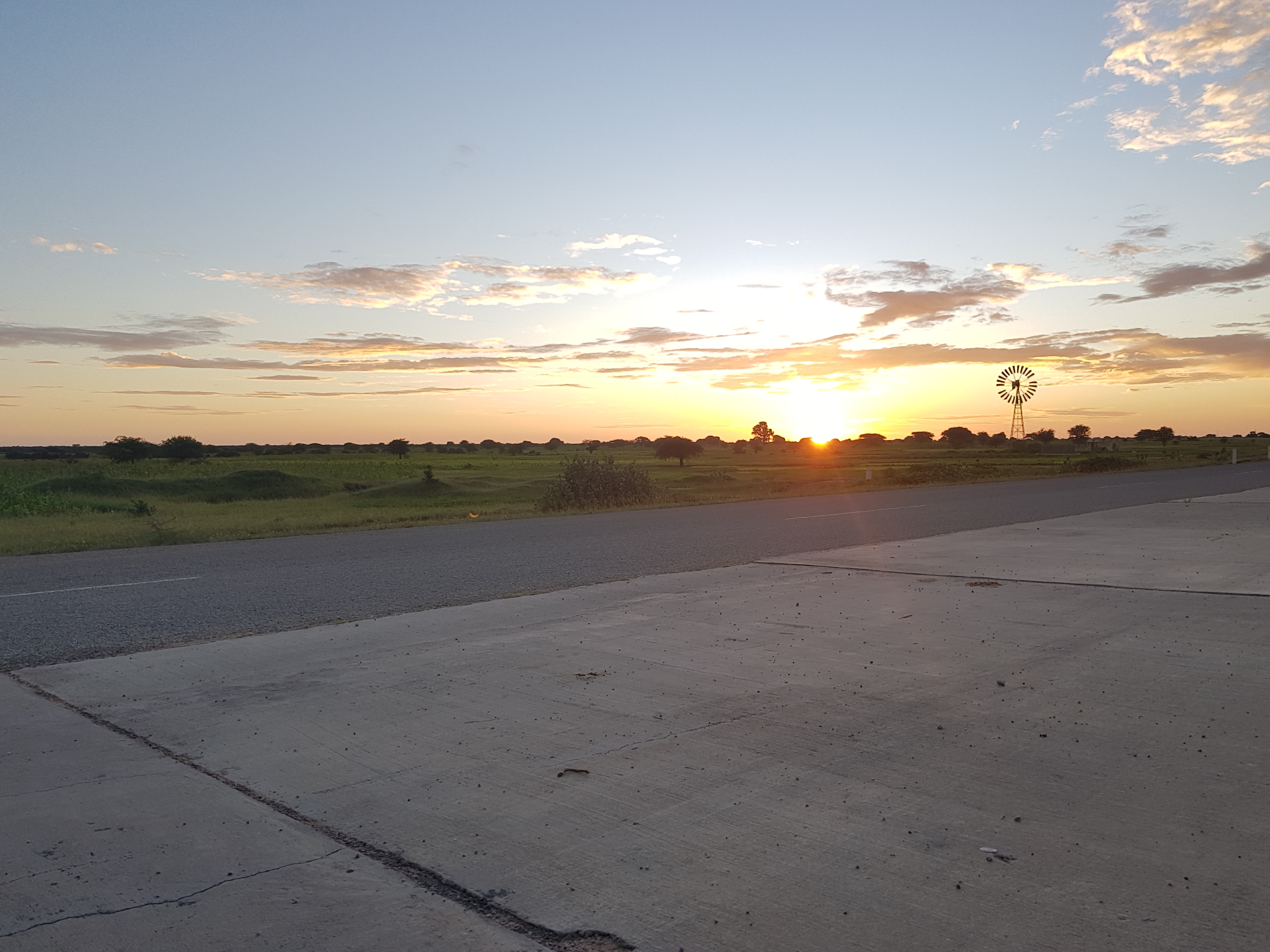
Itigi to Manyon Road

=== Roads ===
In 2019, the district 52.56 kilometres (32.66 mi) paved roads, 300.47 km (186.70 mi) of gravel roads, and 809.72 km (503.14 mi) of dirt roads for a total road network of 1,162.75 km (722.50 mi).

=== Rail ===
There is currently a station in use on the Central Line. A new station for the under construction Tanzania Standard Gauge Railway is being built in Itigi.
