= Ruaha National Park =

National park of Tanzania

- Hifadhi ya Taifa ya Ruaha
- IUCN category II (national park)
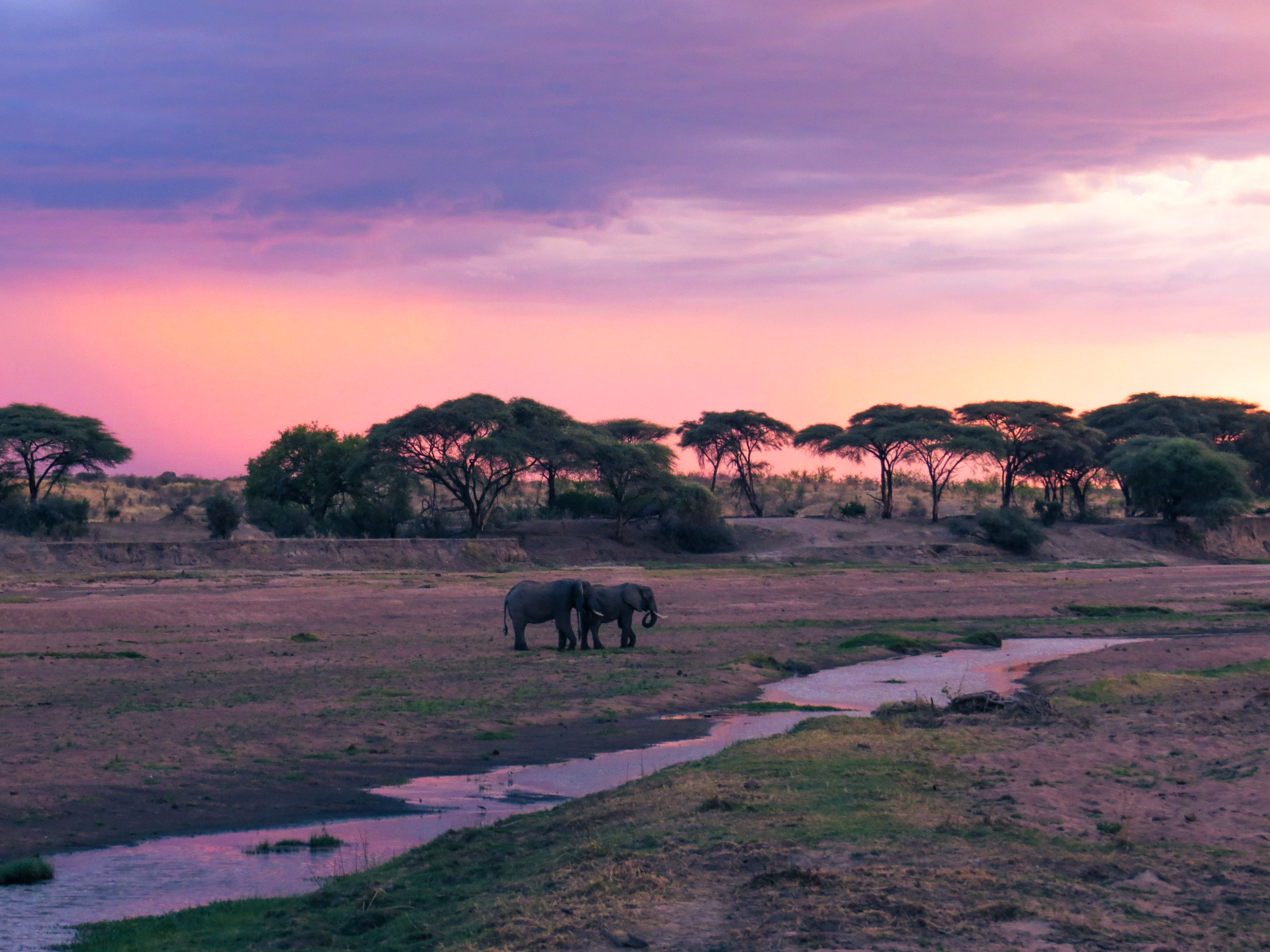

- Location within Tanzania
- Location: Tanzania
- Nearest city: Iringa
- Coordinates: 7°30′S 35°00′E
- Area: 20,226 km^{2} (7,809 sq mi)
- Established: 1964
- Visitors: 21,267 (in 2012)
- Governing body: Tanzania National Parks Authority

Ruaha National Park is a national park in Tanzania. In 2008, the Usangu Game Reserve and other important wetlands were added to the park, increasing its size to about 20,226 km^{2} (7,809 sq mi). The park is about 130 km (81 mi) west of Iringa. The park is part of the 45,000 km^{2} (17,000 sq mi) Rungwa-Kizigo-Muhesi ecosystem, which includes the Rungwa Game Reserve, the Kizigo and Muhesi Game Reserves, and the Mbomipa Wildlife Management Area.

The park's name is derived from the Great Ruaha River, which flows along its southeastern margin and is the focus of game-viewing. The park can be reached by car on a dirt road from Iringa, and there are two airstrips – Msembe Airstrip at Msembe (park headquarters) and Jongomeru Airstrip, near the Jongomeru Ranger Post.

== Climate ==
During the dry season from May to October, the park experiences hot and dry weather with little to no rainfall. Temperatures can reach 35 °C (95 °F) during the day. Night temperatures drop to around 20 °C (68 °F). The vegetation in the park becomes dry, and rivers and water sources dwindle.

== History ==
Germany gazetted the Saba Game Reserve in 1910. British colonial authorities changed the name to the Rungwa Game Reserve in 1946. In 1964, the southern portion of the reserve was excised and elevated to full park status.

== Wildlife ==
Since 2005, the protected area has been considered a Lion Conservation Unit. Other mammals include East African cheetah, African leopard, African wild dog, spotted hyena, Masai giraffe, hippopotamus, African buffalo, greater kudu, lesser kudu, roan antelope and sable antelope. More than 571 species of birds have been identified in the park. Among the resident species are hornbills. Many migratory birds visit the park.

=== Issues ===
- The park was formerly known for its large African bush elephant population. It had numbered 34,000 in the Ruaha-Rungwa ecosystem in 2009 before declining to only 15,836, plus or minus 4,759, in 2015.
- In February 2018, the carcasses of six lions and 74 vultures were found. They appeared to have been poisoned.
