= Nothobranchius itigiensis =

Conservation status
- Vulnerable (IUCN 3.1)

Scientific classification
- Kingdom: Animalia
- Phylum: Chordata
- Class: Actinopterygii
- Order: Cyprinodontiformes
- Family: Nothobranchiidae
- Genus: Nothobranchius
- Species: N. itigiensis

Binomial name
- Nothobranchius itigiensis Nagy, Watters & Bellstedt, 2020

Species of fish

Nothobranchius itigiensis is a species of brightly colored seasonal killifish in the family Nothobranchiidae. This species is endemic to seasonal freshwater habitats in central Tanzania. It is currently known from ephemeral pools and marshes associated with the upper Ruaha drainage and the Bahi Swamp area.

== Etymology ==
The fish is named after the village of Itigi township, in central Tanzania, near where the type species locality is situated.

== Links ==
- Nothobranchius itigiensis on WildNothos - various information and photographs of this species
