= Chobe National Park =

National park in Botswana

- IUCN category II (national park)
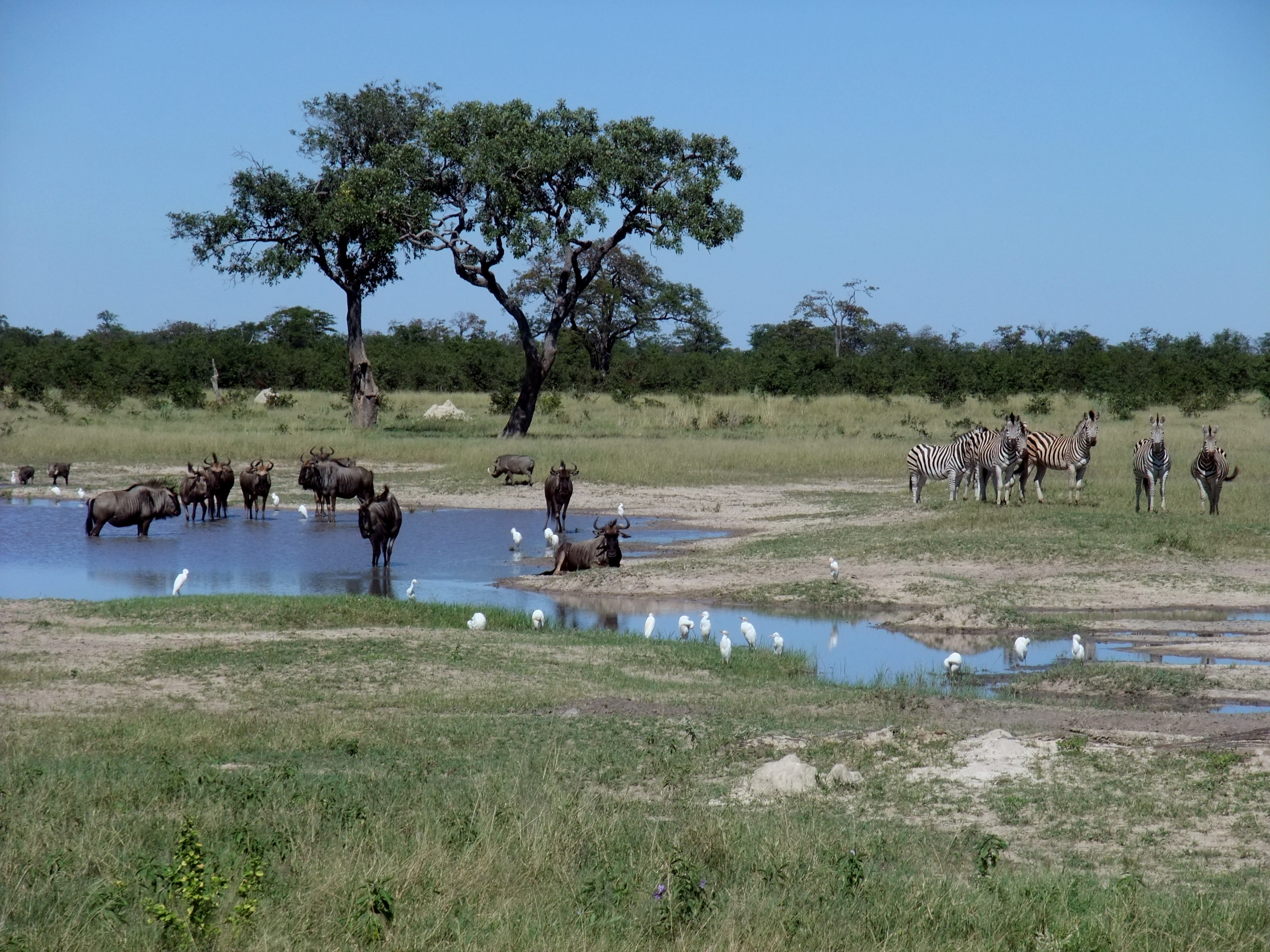
- Wildebeest and zebras in Chobe National Park

- Location within Botswana
- Location: Botswana
- Nearest city: Kasane
- Coordinates: 18°39′S 24°24′E
- Area: 11,700 km^{2} (4,500 sq mi)
- Established: 1967

Chobe National Park is Botswana's first national park, and also its most biologically diverse. The park contains the wetlands of the Chobe River, which flows into Victoria Falls and the Zambezi to the East. Located in the north of the country, the park is part of the Kavango–Zambezi Transfrontier Conservation Area, and partially borders Namibia's Caprivi Strip. It is Botswana's third largest park.

This park is noted for its large herds of African bush elephants and having a population of lions which prey on them, mostly calves or juveniles, but also subadults.

== History ==
The original inhabitants of this area were the San bushmen, known as the Basarwa people in Botswana. The San are nomadic hunter-gatherers who were constantly moving from place to place to find food sources, namely fruit, water and wild animals. San paintings can be found inside rocky hills of the park.

At the beginning of the 20th century, the region that would become Botswana was divided into different land tenure systems. At that time, a major part of the park's area was classified as crown land, having become the British protectorate of Bechuanaland. The idea of a national park which would protect the varied local wildlife and promote tourism was first proposed in 1931. The following year, 24,000 km^{2} (9,300 sq mi) around Chobe district were officially declared a non-hunting area, and this area was expanded to 31,600 km^{2} (12,200 sq mi) two years later.

In 1943, heavy tsetse infestations occurred throughout the region, delaying the creation of the national park. By 1953, the project received governmental attention again: 21,000 km^{2} (8,100 sq mi) were suggested to become a game reserve. Chobe Game Reserve was officially created in 1960, though smaller than initially desired. In 1968, the reserve was declared a national park.

At that time there were several industrial settlements in the region, especially at Serondela, where the timber industry proliferated. These settlements were gradually moved out of the park, and it was not until 1975 that the whole protected area was exempt from human activity. Nowadays traces of the prior timber industry are still visible at Serondela. Minor expansions of the park took place in 1980 and 1987.

== Geography and ecosystems ==
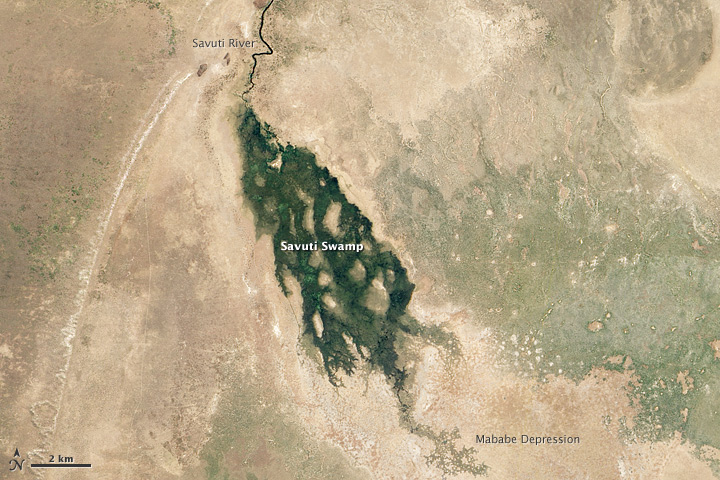
The Savuti Marsh seen from space in May 2012

The park can be divided up to 4 areas, each corresponding to one distinct ecosystem:

- The Serondela area (or Chobe riverfront), situated in the extreme Northeast of the park, has as its main geographical features lush floodplains and dense woodland of Afzelia quanzensis, Baikiaea plurijuga and other hardwoods now largely reduced by heavy elephant pressure. The Chobe River, which flows along the northeastern border of the park, is a major watering spot, especially in the dry season from May to October for large breeding herds of African bush elephants, families of Angolan giraffe, sable antelope and African buffalo. The floodplains are the only place in Botswana where the puku antelope can be seen. Large numbers of southern carmine bee-eaters are spotted in season. When in flood, African spoonbills, ibis, various species of storks, ducks and other waterfowl flock to the area. This is likely Chobe's most visited section, in large part because of its proximity to the Victoria Falls, Zambia. The town of Kasane, situated just downstream, is the most important town of the region and serves as the northern entrance to the park.
- The Savuti Marsh area, 10,878 km^{2} (4,200 sq mi) large, constitutes the western stretch of the park (50 km (31 mi) north of Mababe Gate). The Savuti Marsh is the relic of a large inland lake whose water supply was cut a long time ago by plate tectonics. Nowadays the marsh is fed by the erratic Savuti Channel, which dries up for long periods, then curiously flows again as a consequence of tectonic activity in the area. It is currently flowing again and in January 2010 reached Savuti Marsh for the first time since 1982. As a result of this variable flow, there are hundreds of dead trees along the channel's bank. The region is also covered with extensive savannahs and rolling grasslands, which makes wildlife particularly dynamic in this section of the park. During dry seasons, both black and white rhinoceros, warthog, greater kudu, impala, Burchell's zebra, blue wildebeest and a herd of elephants are seen. During rain seasons, the rich birdlife of 450 species is represented. Prides of lions, hyenas, zebras or more rarely Southeast African cheetahs are sighted as well. This region is reputed for its annual migration of zebras and predators.
- The Linyanti Marsh, located at the northwest corner of the park and to the north of Savuti, is adjacent to the Linyanti River. To the west of this area lies Selinda Reserve and on the northern bank of Kwando River is Namibia's Nkasa Rupara National Park. Around these two rivers are riverine woodlands, open woodlands as well as lagoons, and the rest of the region mainly consists of flood plains. There are large concentrations of lion prides, African leopard, African wild dog, roan antelope, sable antelope, a hippopotamus pod and herds of African bush elephant. The rarer red lechwe, sitatunga and a bask of Nile crocodiles also occur in the area. Bird diversity is rich.
- Between Linyanti and Savuti Marshes lies a hot and dry hinterland, mainly occupied by the Nogatsaa grass woodland. This section is little known and is a great place for spotting common eland.
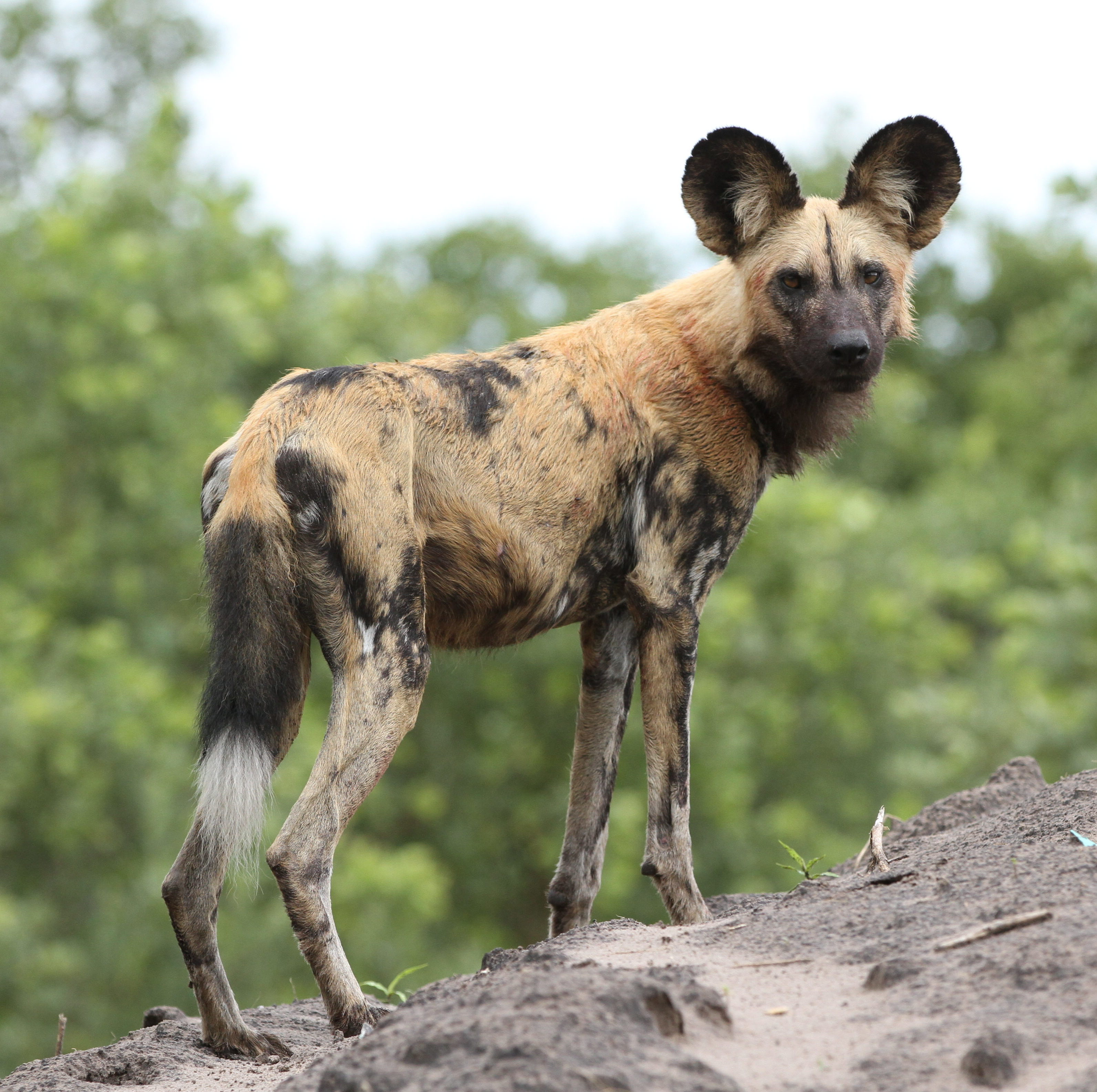
African wild dog

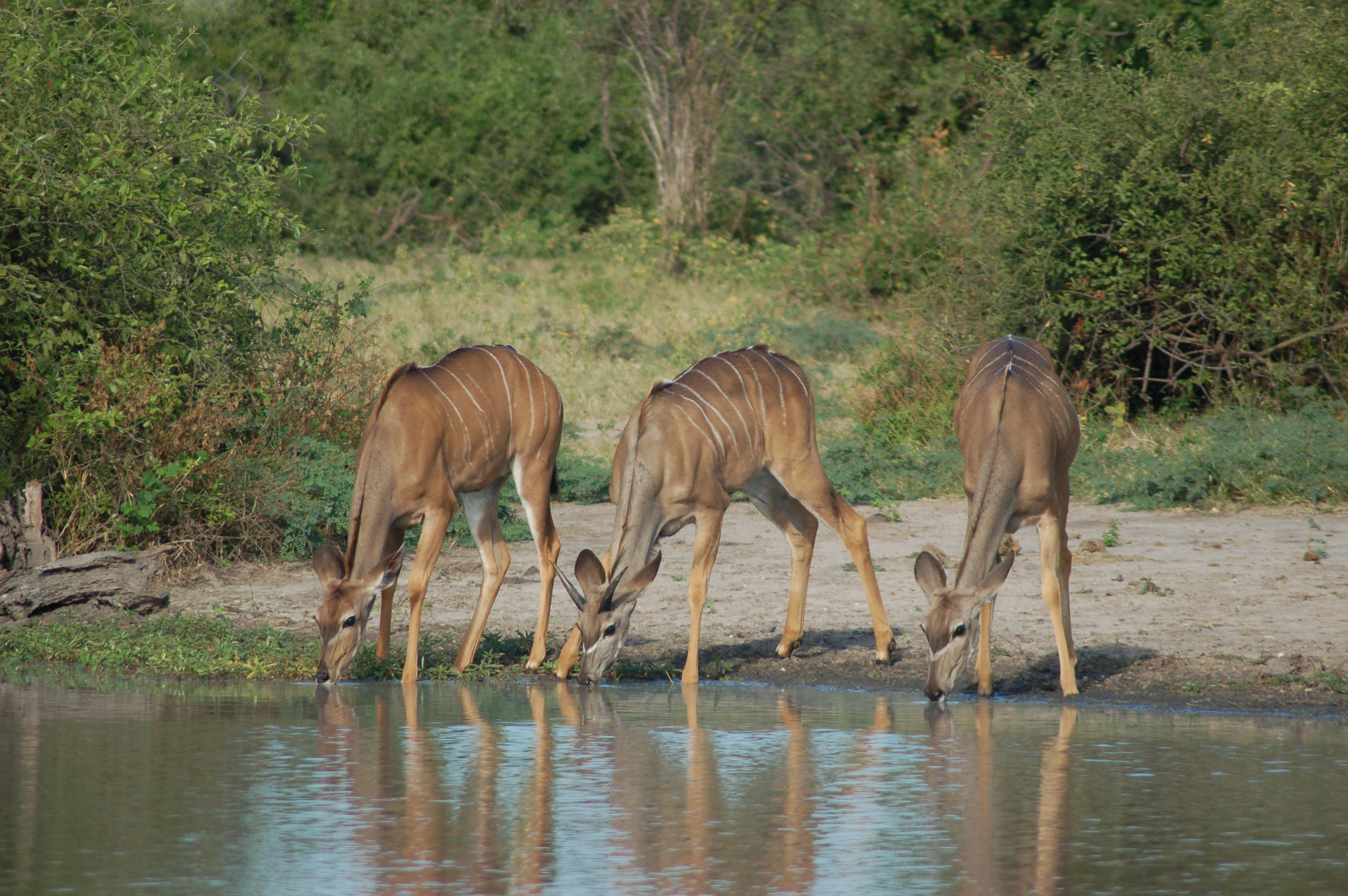
Greater kudu

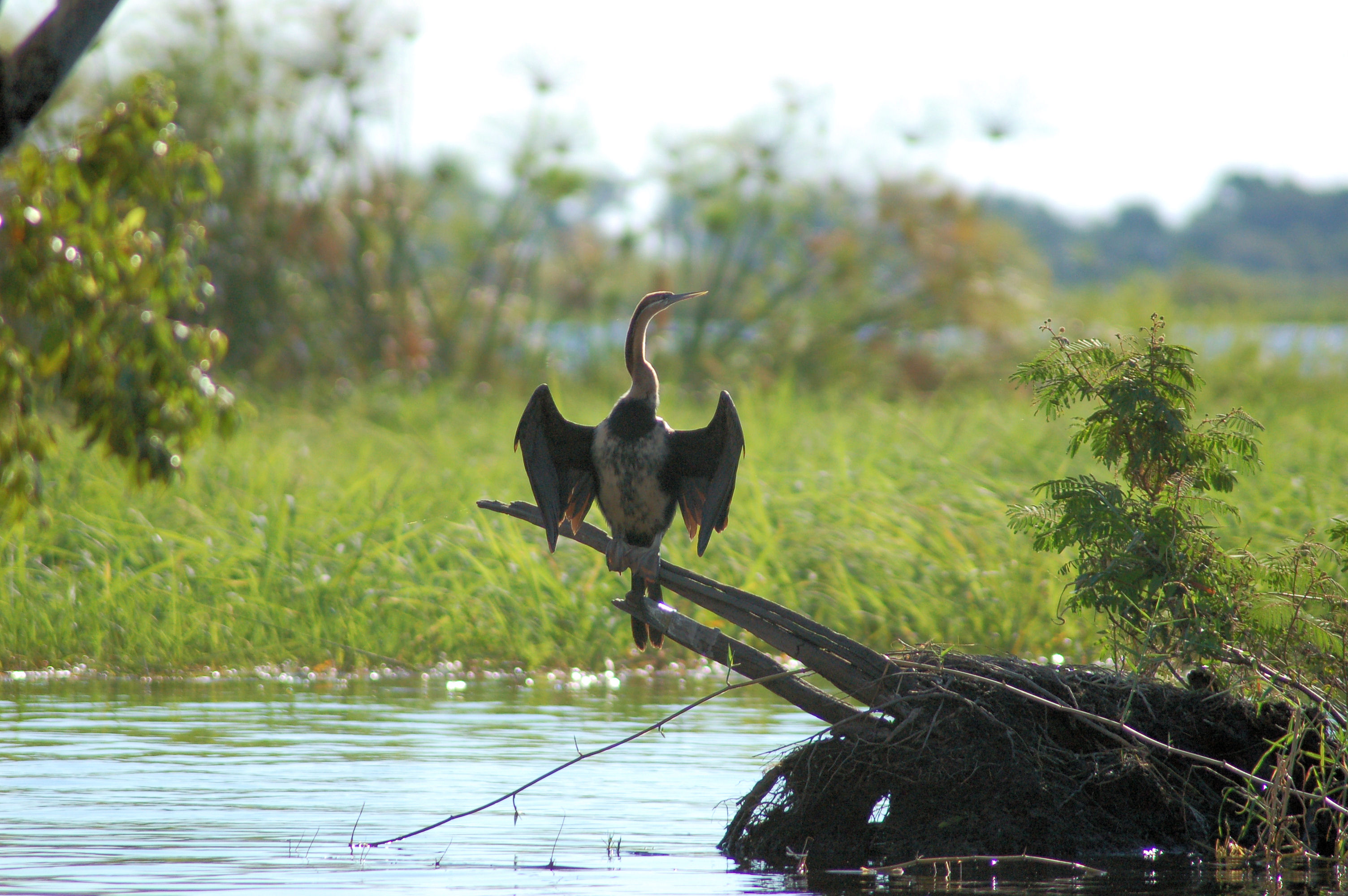
African darter

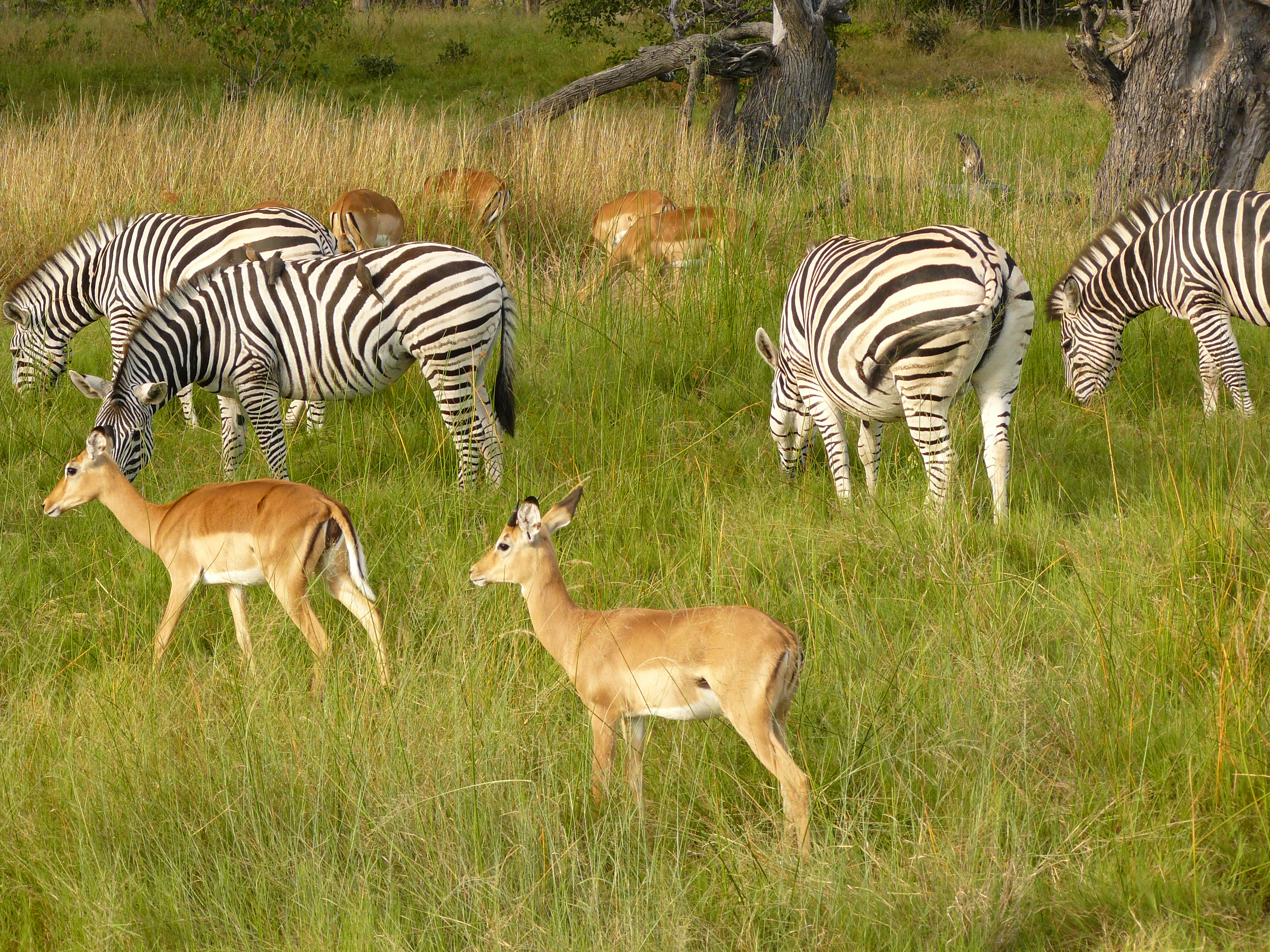
Burchell's zebras and impalas

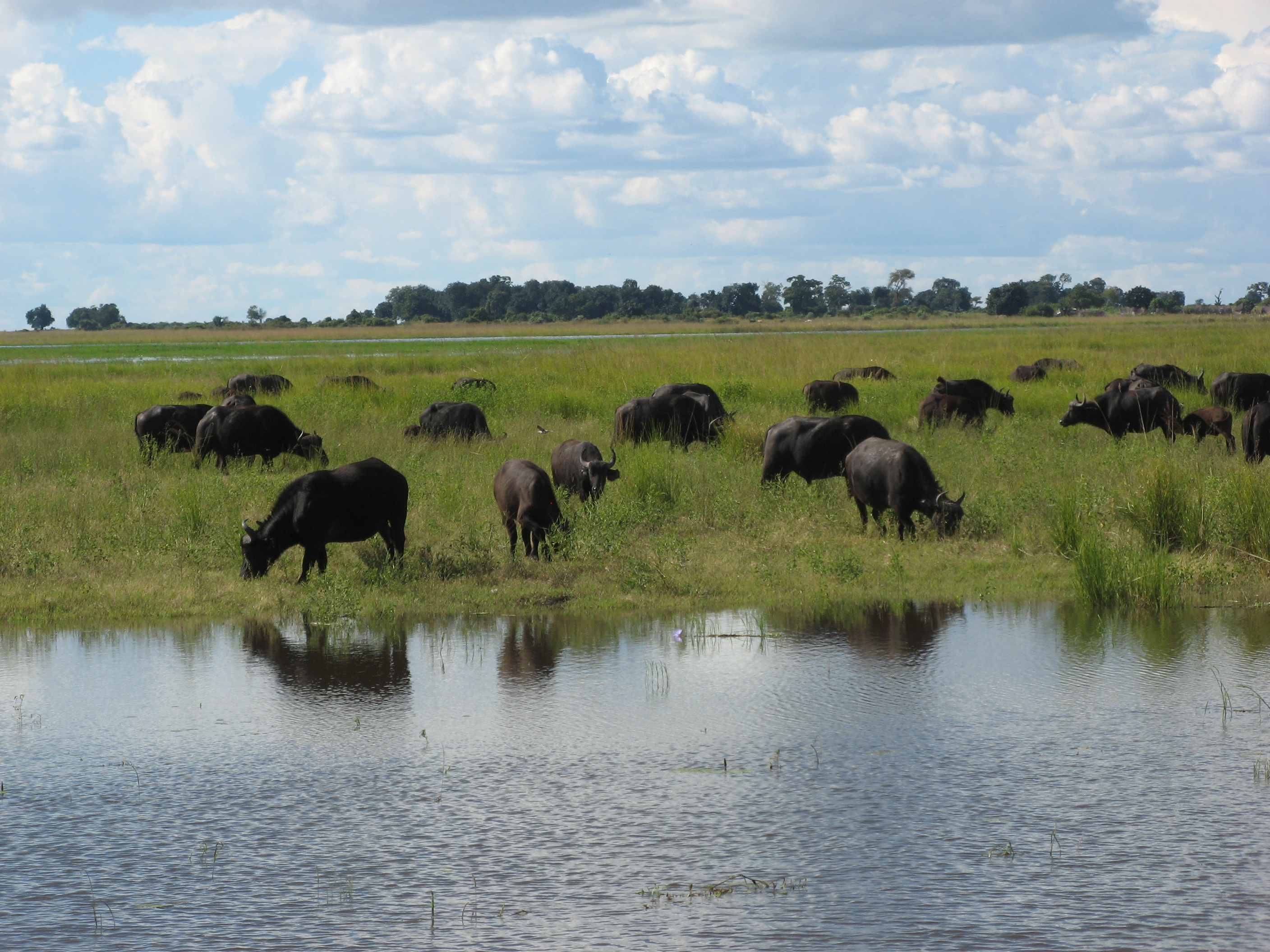
African buffalo

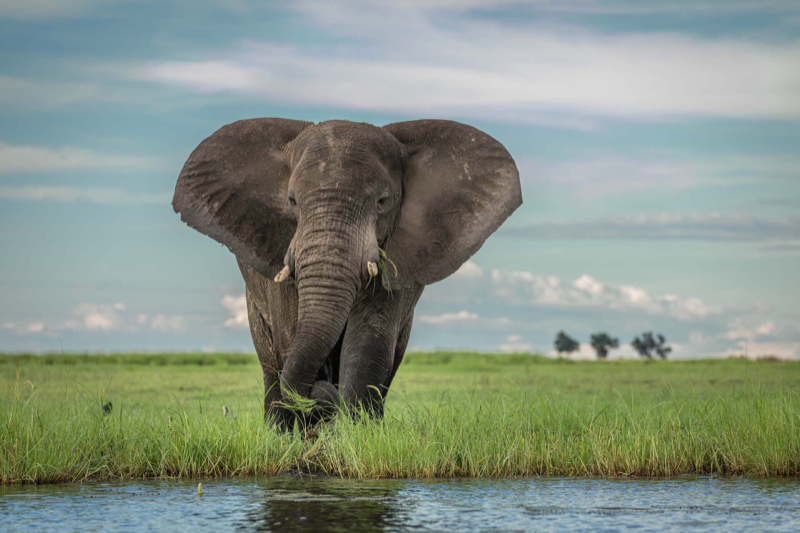
African elephant

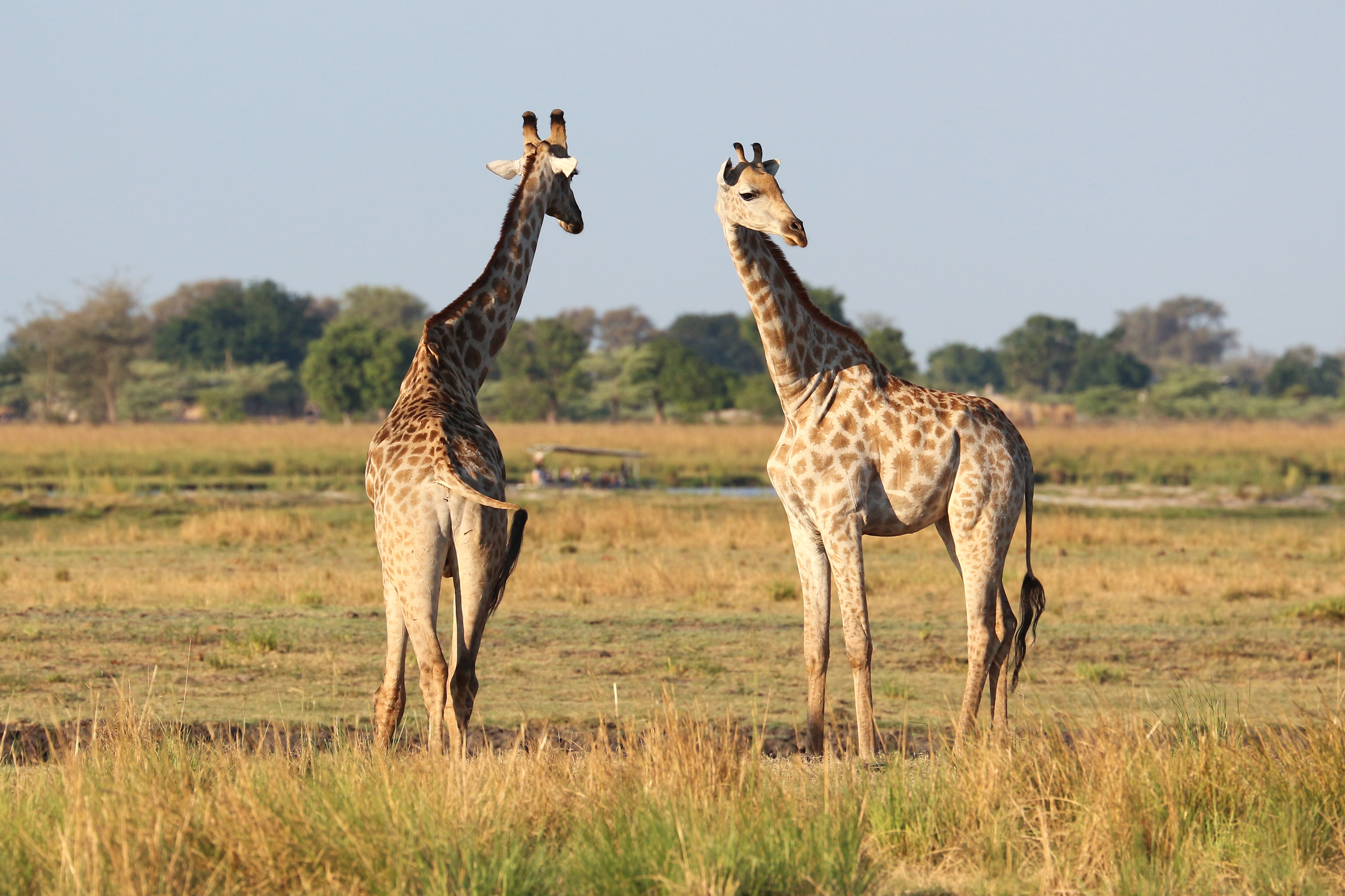
Two giraffes

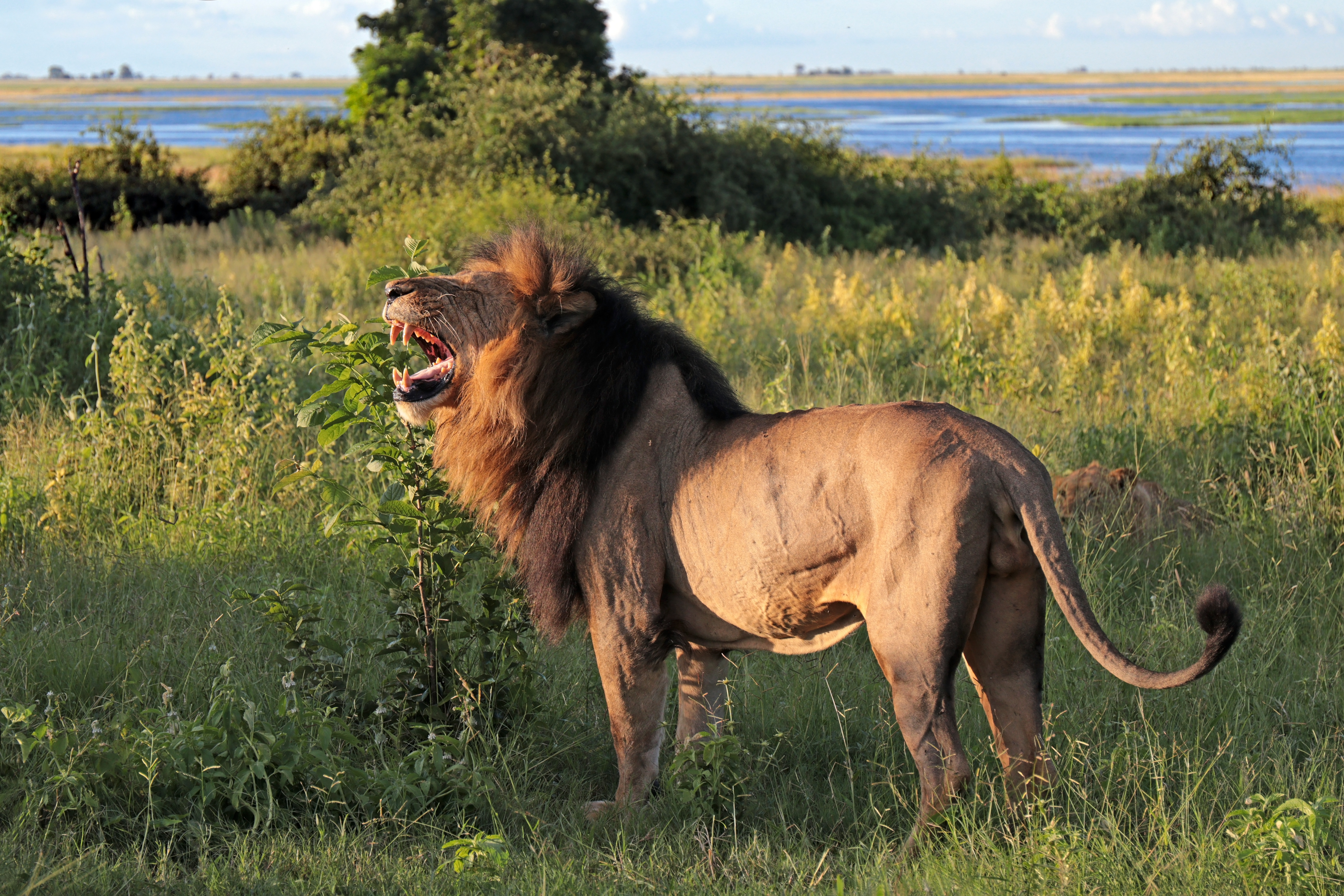
A male lion

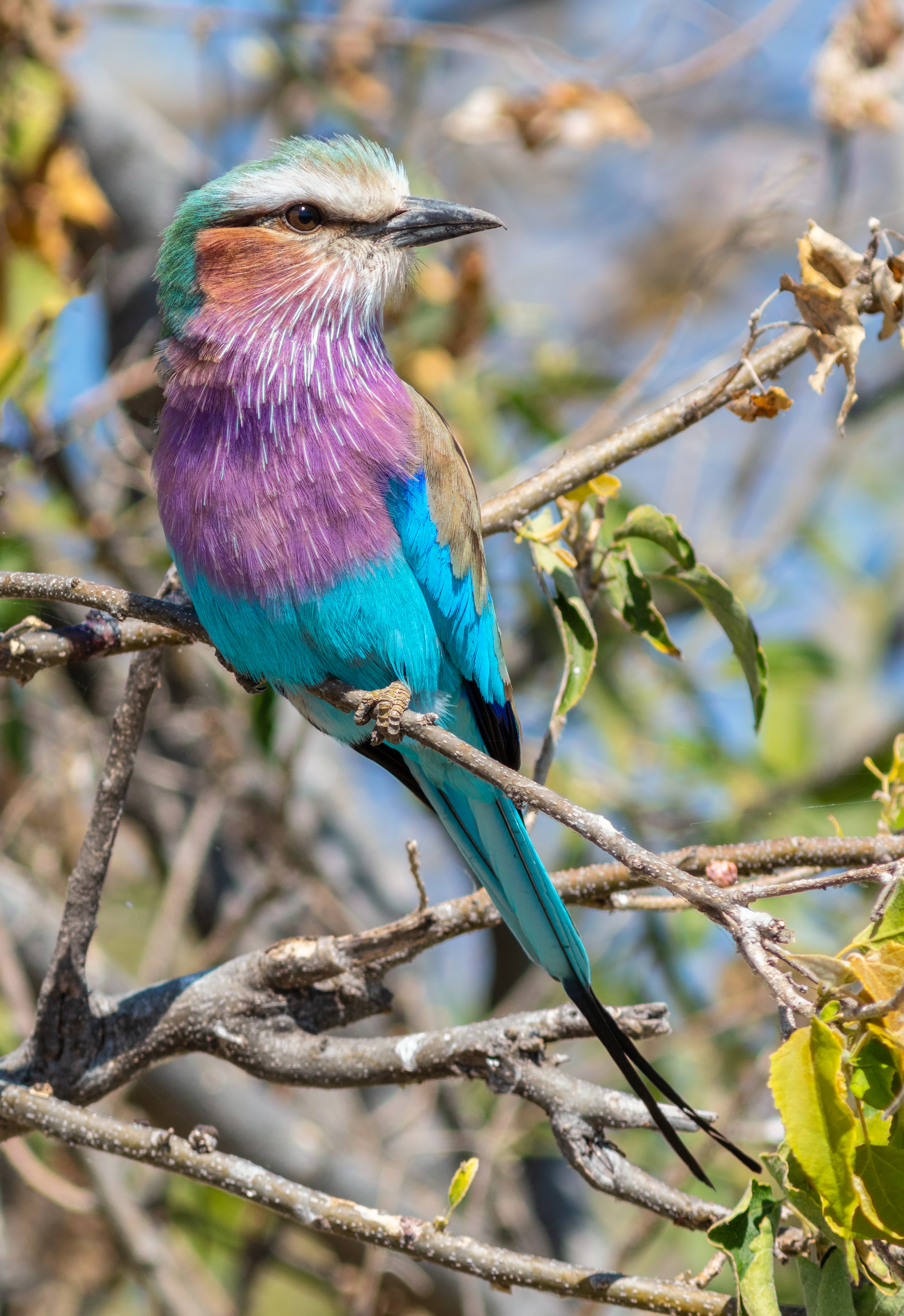
Lilac-breasted roller

== Elephant concentration ==
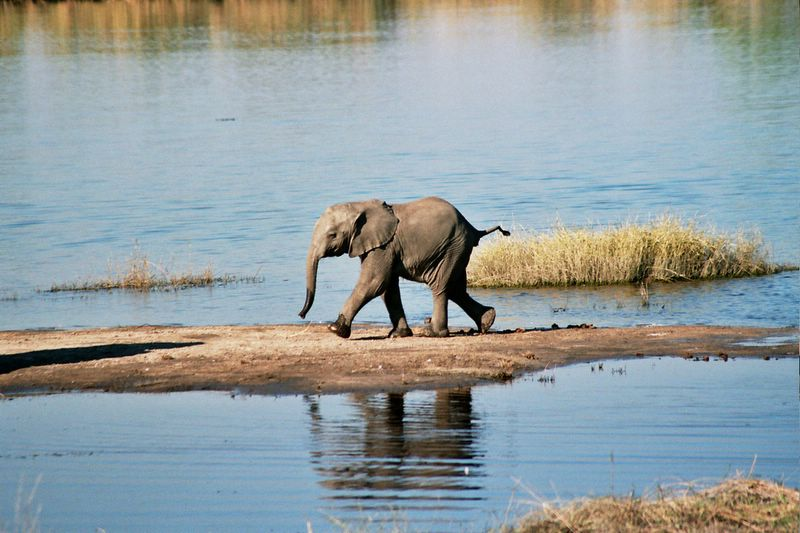
A baby African bush elephant on the banks of the Chobe River

With its abundance of water, the park is widely known for its large elephant population, estimated to be around 50,000. The region is home to Kalahari elephants, which form the largest herds of any known elephant population. Kalahari elephants have rather brittle ivory and short tusks, perhaps due to calcium deficiency in the soils. Damage caused by the high numbers of elephants is rife in some areas. In fact, the concentration is so high throughout Chobe that culls have been considered in the past, but are deemed too controversial and have thus far been rejected by park management. In the dry season, these elephants sojourn in the Chobe River and Linyanti River areas. In the rainy season, they make a 200-kilometre migration to the south-eastern stretch of the park. Their distribution zone however outreaches the park and spreads to north-western Zimbabwe.

Park rangers regularly patrol the national park and are empowered to shoot to kill suspected poachers. In 2016, two farmers were shot after being spotted at night carrying tusks.

== Roads ==
Road conditions in Chobe National Park depend greatly on the season and rainfall; one needs a 4x4 vehicle to travel in the Park. Thick sand becomes a problem in the Chobe River Front during the dry months, particularly as the temperature rises, while during the wet season the roads near the river become muddy.

=== Savuti ===
Savuti roads, mainly the western Sandridge Road from Mababe Gate and the roads both north and south of the Savuti channel are typically thick sand and tricky to drive. When rain has fallen, driving along the marsh roads carries the risk of getting stuck, as the wet black cotton soil becomes unnavigable.

=== Nogatsaa ===
Nogatsaa roads are waterlogged during the wet months and very little of the road network can be driven at this time. During the dry months, game drives from one pan to the next are on roads with small, thick sandy patches. Once leaving the tar road from Kasane, people would have to drive through thick sand for the first 20 km (12 mi), before reaching a sand road.

== See also ==
- Wildlife of Botswana
- Southern Africa
