= Itigi =

- Town
- Location in Tanzania
- Coordinates: 5°42′S 34°29′E
- Country: Tanzania
- Region: Singida Region
- District: Itigi District
- Elevation: 4,285 ft (1,306 m)

Population (2022 census)
  - Total: 24,000
- Time zone: UTC+3 (East Africa Time)
- Climate: BSh

Itigi is a town in central Tanzania. It is located in Itigi District of the Singida Region.

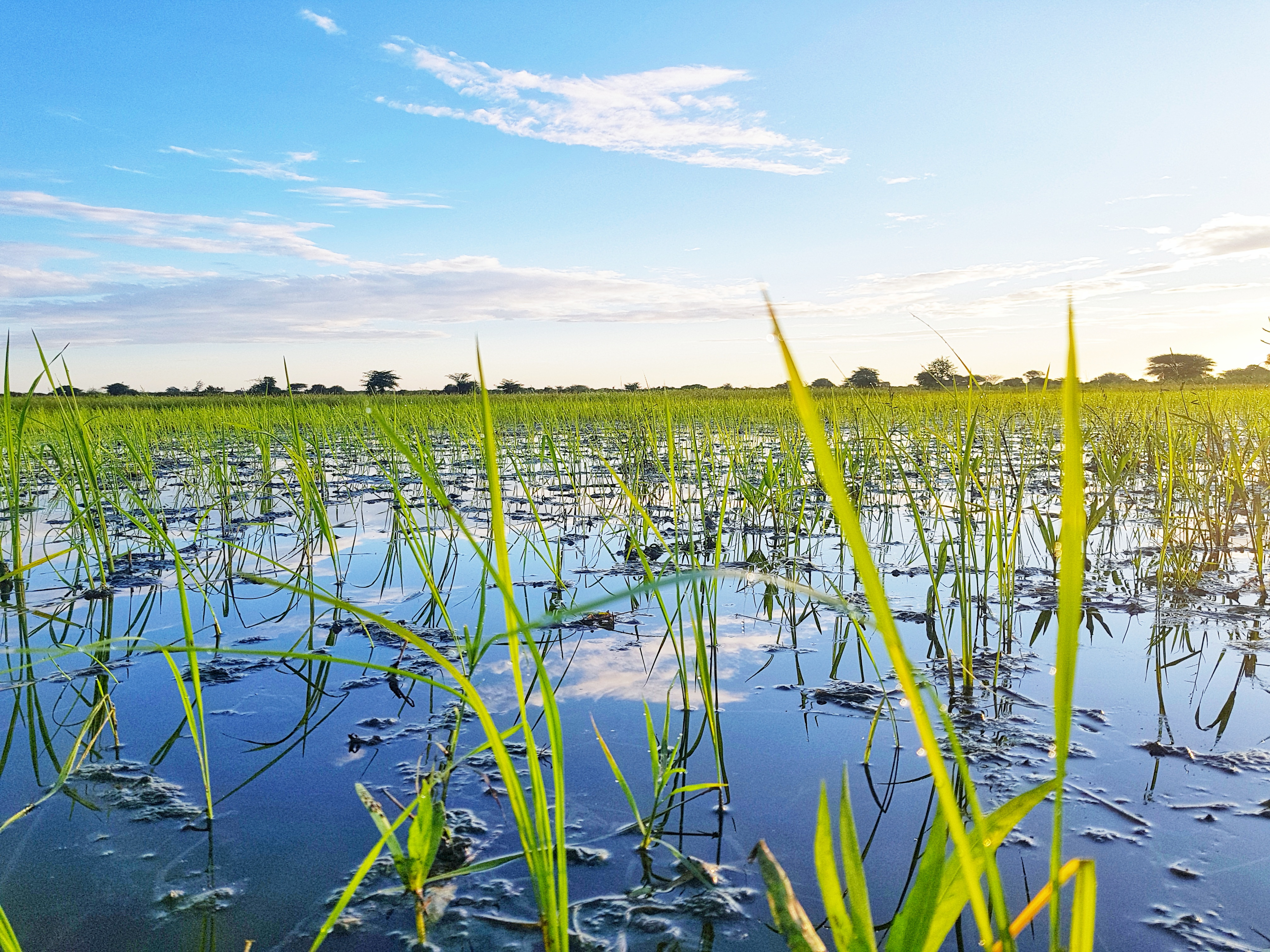
Paddy fields near Itigi.

The town is made up of the wards Itigi and Itigi Majengo. According to the 2012 Tanzania National Census, the population of these two wards combined was 21,777.

== Transport ==
Unpaved Trunk road T18 from Manyoni to Tabora and unpaved trunk road T22 from Singida Region to Mbeya Region pass through the town.

Itigi is a station on the Central Line of Tanzanian Railways.

== See also ==
- Railway stations in Tanzania
- Transport in Tanzania

== Fish named after village ==
Nothobranchius itigiensis Nagy, Watters & Bellstedt, 2020 was named after the village because the fish was originally found nearby.
