= Rungwa Game Reserve =

Game reserve in Tanzania

- IUCN category IV (habitat/species management area)
- Location within Tanzania
- Location: Itigi, Singida, Tanzania
- Nearest city: Mbeya
- Coordinates: 7°11′53″S 33°57′47″E
- Area: 9,000 km^{2} (3,500 mi^{2})
- Established: 1951
- Administrator: Tanzania Wildlife Management Authority (TAWA)
- Website: www.rungwa.com

The Rungwa Game Reserve is a protected area in Tanzania that covers an area of 9,000 km^{2} (3,500 sq mi). It was established in 1951. It is situated in Itigi District, Singida Region.

Since 2005, the protected area is considered a Lion Conservation Unit.

The reserve is composed of hills mixed with patches of forest along the streams and the Mpera River valley, which provides water in the dry season and becomes the best game viewing areas from July to November. It covers a large part of Central and West Tanzania and primarily covered with miombo woodlands giving access to excellent thicket is a unique vegetation type found only in two places in Africa. The predominant wildlife species in Rungwa Game Reserve are: lion, leopard, African buffalo, eland, sable, greater kudu, grysbok, klipspringer, oribi, hartebeest, liechtenstein, impala, zebra, hippopotamus, crocodile and bush pig.

The temperatures at this reserve are mild with very low humidity. The annual rainfall ranges from 750 mm (30 in) in the east to 1,300 mm (51 in) in the western part of the game reserve.
