= List of protected areas of Tanzania =

Protected areas in Tanzania (Hifadhi za Mali hai za Tanzania, in Swahili) are extremely varied, ranging from sea habitats over grasslands to the top of the Kilimanjaro, the tallest mountain in Africa. About a third of the country's total area is protected to a certain degree as a national park, game reserve, marine park, forest reserve or the like. 840 protected areas are spread across 7,330 km^{2} of ocean and 361,594 km^{2} of land in Tanzania. The coastal and marine areas are less protected than terrestrial ecosystems, which are given the highest level of protection. Tanzania is one of the world's major biodiversity hotspots thanks to its vast national parks, "the Eastern Arc" mountains, wetlands, coastal forests, marine, and freshwater systems as remarkable reservoirs of plant and animal species. A wide range of endemic species of birds, reptiles, snakes, amphibians, wild coffee variations, and the well-known African violet flower can also be found in Tanzania.

== Overview ==
The world's most stunning annual migration of large mammals takes place in the Ngorongoro Conservation Area and Serengeti National Park, both of which are Biosphere Reserves and World Heritage Sites. They travel through one of the country's major forest ecosystems, the Acacia-Commiphora woodlands and associated wide-open grasslands of Serengeti National Park, while in Ngorongoro Conservation Area, they travel through the upper Kitete/Selela corridor along the Great Rift Valley, which connects the area to Lake Manyara National Park and is used by elephants and buffaloes. It goes without saying that Tanzania's wildlife corridors are under grave danger due to the severe strain from land use change. The President recently approved the creation of the River Ugalla, Kigosi, and Julius Nyerere National Parks.

Tanzania is home to portions of eight transboundary conservation areas, including the Amboseli-Kilimanjaro-Longido, Kagera, Mnazi BayQuirimbas, Niassa, Serengeti-Mara, Tanga Marine Reserves System, Tanga Coelacanth Marine Park, Diani Chale, Kisitee-Mpunguti, and Western Indian Ocean Transfrontier Marine Park.

== Key Species ==
Tanzania is one of the 15 countries with the largest percentage of endemic and threatened species worldwide, with at least 14,500 known and confirmed species. Tanzania also has a wide variety of species. In terms of bird species, it makes up more than a third of all plant species in Africa and is the 12th most abundant in the world. 20% of Africa's population of large mammals reside in the nation. More over half (54%) of the species that are present in the nation are plant species. Notably, more than 25% of all plant species are employed as therapeutic plants that can be gathered from the wild.

Unknown is the precise number of endemic species in the nation. However, the evidence that is now available suggests that there are between 400 and 3,000 different indigenous species. The Black Rhino (Diceros bicornis) and elephants (Loxodonta africana), which are threatened owing to poaching, are two species of concern based on the analysis of threatened species in the nation, taking into account ecological, economic, and social value. Pan troglodytes, colobus monkeys (Procolobus gordonorum and Procolobus kirkii), mangabey monkeys (Rungwecebus kipunji, Cercocebus sanjei), leopards (Panthera pardus), cheetahs (Acinonyx jubatus), and African wild dogs (Lycaon pictus) are some other keystone species of critical importance. The biggest lion (Panthera leo) population in the world is found in Tanzania. Additionally, there are species of high-value timber, such as Afzelia spp., Pterocarpus spp., and Diospyros mespiliformis. There are also significant marine species, such as tuna, dugongs, and marine turtles, as well as prawns (Metapenaeus monocerus, Penaeus indicus, and P. monodon).

The following list gives an overview on the various protected areas in Tanzania including their predominant habitat, wildlife and flora. Especially remarkable species (endemics or those occurring in unusually large numbers) are set in bold.

== National parks ==
Twenty three national parks together comprise an area of more than 99,306.5 square kilometres (38,342.5 sq mi). They are administered by the Tanzania National Parks Authority (TANAPA). Names like Arusha and Serengeti are well known, partly due to films about African wildlife.

National Park	Habitat	Flora/Fauna	Comments	Picture
Arusha National Park established: 1960 renamed: 1967 enlarged: 1973 area: 137 km^{2}	dense forest, swamp, grassland, lakes, alpine highland, rocks 1,525–4,565 m	giraffe, Cape buffalo, elephant, zebra, dik-dik, hippopotamus, waterbuck, warthog, leopard, eland, spotted hyena, klipspringer, baboon, blue monkey, black-and-white colobus, greater flamingo, lesser flamingo, sacred ibis, Maccoa duck, Egyptian goose, turaco, Narina trogon, red-hot poker, giant lobelia	400 bird species	
Gombe Stream National Park established: 1943 gazetted: 1968 area: 52 km^{2}	miombo woodland, gallery forest 750–1,500 m	chimpanzee, olive baboon, red-tailed monkey, red colobus, diademed monkey, leopard, bushbuck, buffalo, waterbuck, barbet, palm-nut vulture, Forbes' plover, African fish eagle, Peters's twinspot	Jane Goodall worked here	
Katavi National Park established: 1951 gazetted: 1974 area: 4,471 km^{2}	miombo woodland, river, lakes, floodplain 900 m	eland, sable antelope, roan antelope, hippopotamus, crocodile, lion, leopard, elephant, zebra, buffalo, topi, pelican, waterfowl	more than 400 bird species	
Kilimanjaro National Park established: 1910s, 1921 gazetted: 1973 world heritage: 1987 area: 753 km^{2}	montane forest, moorland, alpine desert 1,830–5,895 m	Abbott's duiker, grey duiker, red forest duiker, bushbuck, eland, elephant, leopard, buffalo, small antelope, blue monkey, black-and-white colobus, galago crassicaudatus, Kilimanjaro tree hyrax, Abbot's starling, raven, papilio sjoestedti, giant lobelia, moss, lichen	highest freestanding mountain in the world, world's tallest summit that can be climbed without technical equipment.	
Kitulo National Park gazetted: 2002 area: 412.9 km^{2}	montane grassland at 2,600 m	red-hot poker, aloe, protea, pelargonium geranium, giant lobelia, lilies, asters, Denham's bustard, blue swallow, mountain marsh widow, cisticola njombe, Kipengere seedeater, mountain reedbuck, eland, chameleon, lizards, frogs	350 species of vascular plants among which 45 varieties of terrestrial orchid, many bird species	
Lake Manyara National Park established: 1957 established: 1960 area: 325 km^{2} enlarged: 2009 area: 644 km^{2}	lake (2/3), forest, grassland 960–1,478 m	elephant, Cape buffalo, lion, hippopotamus, impala, giraffe, zebra, wildebeest, bushbuck, leopard, baboon, lesser flamingo, greater flamingo, white pelican, yellow-billed stork, white-breasted cormorant, palm-nut vulture, Ayres's hawk-eagle, Nile monitor, cobra	greatest biomass density in the world; tree-climbing lions	
Mahale Mountains National Park gazetted: 14 June 1985 area: 1,613 km^{2}	miombo forest, Kasoge (lowland) forest, montane rainforest 773–2,460 m	chimpanzee, red colobus, red-tailed monkey, blue monkey, giant squirrel, red-legged sun squirrel, brush-tailed porcupine, bushy-tailed mongoose, Angolan black-and-white colobus, Sharpe's grysbok, red-collared widowbird, speckled mousebird, crowned eagle, bee-eater, roller, crested guineafowl, Ross' turaco, white-browed robin-chat, red-winged starling, violet-backed starling, parrots	savanna and forest adapted species, 90% of 193 fish species in the lake are endemic	
Mikumi National Park established: 1964 extended: 1975 area: 3,230 km^{2}	floodplain, grassland, wooded savanna, miombo covered hills 550–1,257 m	eland, greater kudu, yellow baboon, vervet monkey, serval, sable antelope, hippopotamus, zebra, lion, wildebeest, impala, buffalo, giraffe, elephant, lilac-breasted roller, yellow-throated longclaw, bateleur eagle, waterbirds	more than 400 bird species	
Mount Meru (Tanzania) See Arusha National Park			part of Arusha National Park	
Mkomazi National Park established: 2006 area: 3,254 km^{2}	semi–arid savanna	oryx, kudu, African wild dog, black rhinoceros, also big mammals	famous for African wild dog and black rhinoceros	
Nyerere National Park established: 1922 gazetted: 2019 area: 30,893 km^{2}	miombo woodland, open wooded grassland, riverine swamps 80–1,300 m	African wild dog, elephant, cheetah, giraffe, hippopotamus, buffalo, crocodile, white rhinoceros, wildebeest, hyena	largest national park in Tanzania; formerly the northern part of Selous Game Reserve	
Ruaha National Park established: 1910 gazetted: 1964 area: 20,226 km^{2}	miombo woodland, savanna 750–1,830 m	elephant, hornbill, kingfisher, sunbird, white stork, African wild dog, sable antelope, greater kudu, crested barbet, yellow-collared lovebird	more than 400 bird species, high diversity of antelopes	
Rubondo Island National Park established: 1977 area: 240 km^{2}	humid forest, lakeside papyrus beds, open grassland 1,134 - 1,381 m	yellow-spotted otter, Nile perch, African fish eagle, hippopotamus, vervet monkey, genet, mongoose, bushbuck, sitatunga, grey parrot, malachite kingfisher, paradise flycatcher, herons, storks, spoonbills		
Saadani National Park established: 1969 gazetted: 2002 area: 1,062 km^{2}	coast, river, forest, savanna	giraffe, buffalo, warthog, waterbuck, reedbuck, hartebeest, wildebeest, red forest duiker, greater kudu, eland, sable antelope, yellow baboon, vervet monkey, elephant, lion, leopard, spotted hyena, black-backed jackal, hippopotamus, crocodile, mangrove kingfisher, lesser flamingo, green turtle	only sanctuary bordering the sea	
Saanane Island National Park established: 2013 gazetted: 2013 area: 2.18 km^{2}			located within the city	
Serengeti National Park established: 1929 gazetted: 1951 world heritage: 1981 area: 14,763 km^{2}	grassland plains, savanna, riverine forest, woodland; 920–1,850 m	wildebeest, zebra, lion, leopard, elephant, black rhinoceros, buffalo, cheetah, gazelle, giraffe, spotted hyena, jackal, aardwolf, serval, agama lizard, rock hyrax, secretary bird, ostrich, black eagle	most visited park in Tanzania; famous for massive migration of ungulates; more than 500 bird species	
Tarangire National Park established: 1970 area: 2,850 km^{2}	grassland, savanna; 1,000–1,500 m	oryx, gerenuk, elephant, baobab, lesser kudu, African wild dog, lion kori bustard, ground hornbill, ostrich, yellow-collared lovebird, rufous-tailed weaver, ashy starling, dwarf mongoose, red-and-yellow barbet	550 bird varieties; largest concentration of wildlife behind Serengeti	
Udzungwa Mountains National Park established: 1994 area: 1,990 km^{2}	tropical rainforest, mountain forest, miombo woodland, grassland, steppe 250–2,600 m	rufous-winged sunbird, Udzungwa partridge, sanje crested mangabey, Iringa red colobus, rungwecerbus kipunji, matundu dwarf galago, mountain dwarf galago, reptiles and amphibians, hyrax, squirrel, also big mammals	more than 400 bird species, 2,500 plant species; many endemics (25% of plant species, 5 primates); second-largest biodiversity in Africa	

== Game Reserves and other protected areas ==
Name	Habitat	Flora/Fauna	Comments	Picture
Ngorongoro Conservation Area established: 1959 world heritage: 1979 area: 8,288 km^{2}	grassland, lakes, swamp, woodland, heath, dense mountain forest 1,500–3,648 m	wildebeest, zebra, gazelle, black rhinoceros, lion, hartebeest, spotted hyena, hippopotamus, buffalo, elephant, mountain reedbuck, leopard, serval, ostrich, kori bustard, papilio sjoestedti	many archeological and paleontological sites: Olduvai Gorge, Laetoli, Lake Ndutu	
Selous Game Reserve established: 1922 world heritage: 1982 area: 44,800 km^{2}	miombo woodland, open wooded grassland, riverine swamps 80–1,300 m	African wild dog, elephant, cheetah, giraffe, hippopotamus, buffalo, crocodile, white rhinoceros,	largest game reserve in Africa; 350 bird species	
Uwanda Game Reserve established: 1971 area: 5,000 km^{2}	floodplain, grassland, woodland 1,200 m	puku, zebra, topi, buffalo, elephant		

== Marine Parks and Reserves ==
Name	Habitat	Flora/Fauna	Comments	Picture
Mafia Island Marine Park established: 1 July 1995 area: 882 km^{2}	coral reefs, sea grass beds, mangroves, inter-tidal flats, coastal forest	dugong, gold-striped fusilier, cigar wrasse, queen coris, goldbar wrasse, grouper, barracuda, rainbow runner, black-spotted ribbontail ray, blue-spotted ribbontail ray, eagle ray, manta ray, yellowfin tuna, giant trevally, mackerel, bonito, cobia, reef shark, green turtle, hawksbill turtle, Comoros lesser flying fox, duiker, bush pig, mongoose, elephant shrew		
Tanga Coelacanth Marine Park established: 1 July 2000 area: 552 km^{2}	mangroves, sand dunes, sea, coastal forest, river	coral and Dugong		
Dar es Salaam Marine Reserve established: 1975 area: 15 km^{2}	mangroves, sand dunes, sea, coastal forest, river	coral and Coconut crab		
Mnazi Bay-Ruvumba Estuary Marine Park established: 1 July 2000 area: 650 km^{2}	mangroves, sand dunes, sea, coastal forest, river	coral, whale, dolphin, crocodile, hippopotamus, terrapin	more than 400 fish species	

== Nature Forest Reserves ==
Nature Forest Reserves (NFRs) are a designation under the National Forest Act of Tanzania which offers the highest level of protection. NFRs are state-owned and are managed by the Tanzania Forest Services (TFS) Agency. No extraction of timber or animals is permitted in forest nature reserves, and activities are generally restricted to research, education, and nature-based tourism.

- Amani Nature Forest Reserve
- Chome Forest Reserve
- Kilombero Nature Forest Reserve
- Mount Longido Nature Forest Reserve
- Kipo Forest Reserve
- Magamba Nature Forest Reserve
- Minziro Nature Forest Reserve
- Mkingu Nature Forest Reserve
- Mount Hanang Nature Forest Reserve
- Mount Rungwe Nature Forest Reserve
- Nilo Nature Forest Reserve
- Rondo Nature Forest Reserve
- Uluguru Nature Forest Reserve
- Uzungwa Scarp Nature Forest Reserve

== Game Controlled Areas ==
- Endulen Game Controlled Area
- Handeni Game Controlled Area
- Kalimawe Game Controlled Area
- Masailand Game Controlled Area
- Kitwai Game Controlled Area

== Threats ==
Tanzania's biodiversity is under threat from a variety of natural and human factors, similar to other nations. Overexploitation of plant and animal species, the introduction of non-native species, pollution, and climate change are the greatest threats to biodiversity in Tanzania. Another issue is habitat loss and degradation brought on by conversion to other land uses, such as urbanisation, agriculture, and grazing.

Loss of biodiversity in water systems is caused by human activities such as poaching, deforestation, bottom trawling in the oceans, unsustainable fishing methods, damming and dredging of streams, rivers, and lakes, and draining and degrading of wetlands, estuaries, and mangroves. Economic expansion, population increase, poverty, the international commerce in plant and animal species, and climate change are all combined to form this activity. Deforestation, coral bleaching, habitat loss through fires, unplanned land use, uncontrolled resource exploitation, an increase in the trade in bush meat, and the construction of roads and other infrastructures are all severe risks to ecosystems. One such habitat type that is under great pressure to change into other land forms is wildlife corridors.

Mangrove, coral, dynamite fishing, and illegal fishnet use pose serious threats to habitats in marine ecosystems, while eutrophication and pollution caused by decreased precipitation and increased evaporation, overfishing, illegal fishing, the introduction of exotic fish and species, particularly Nile perch and water hyacinth, and declining water levels pose serious threats to habitats in inland water ecosystems.

Unsustainable animal species exploitation puts enormous pressure on habitats in terrestrial ecosystems. Larger carnivores like lions, leopards, cheetahs, and wild dogs as well as populations of elephants, giraffes, zebras, buffaloes (Syncerus caffer), antelopes, wildebeest (Connochaetus taurinus), and black rhinos (Diceros bicornis) are among the key species that are under pressure.

== See also ==
- List of national parks
- Maziwi Island
- Ministry of Natural Resources and Tourism (Tanzania)
