= KIPO =

KIPO or Kipo may refer to:

- Korean Intellectual Property Office, formerly Korean Industrial Property Office, a South Korean governmental office
- KIPO (FM), a radio station (89.3 FM) licensed to Honolulu, Hawaii, United States
- Kipo and the Age of Wonderbeasts, an animated TV series
  - Kipo, a 2015 webcomic by Radford Sechrist which Kipo and the Age of Wonderbeasts is based on
- Kipo Forest Reserve in Rufiji District, Tanzania
