= Nyerere National Park =

National Park in Tanzania

- Selous Game Reserve
- IUCN category II (national park)
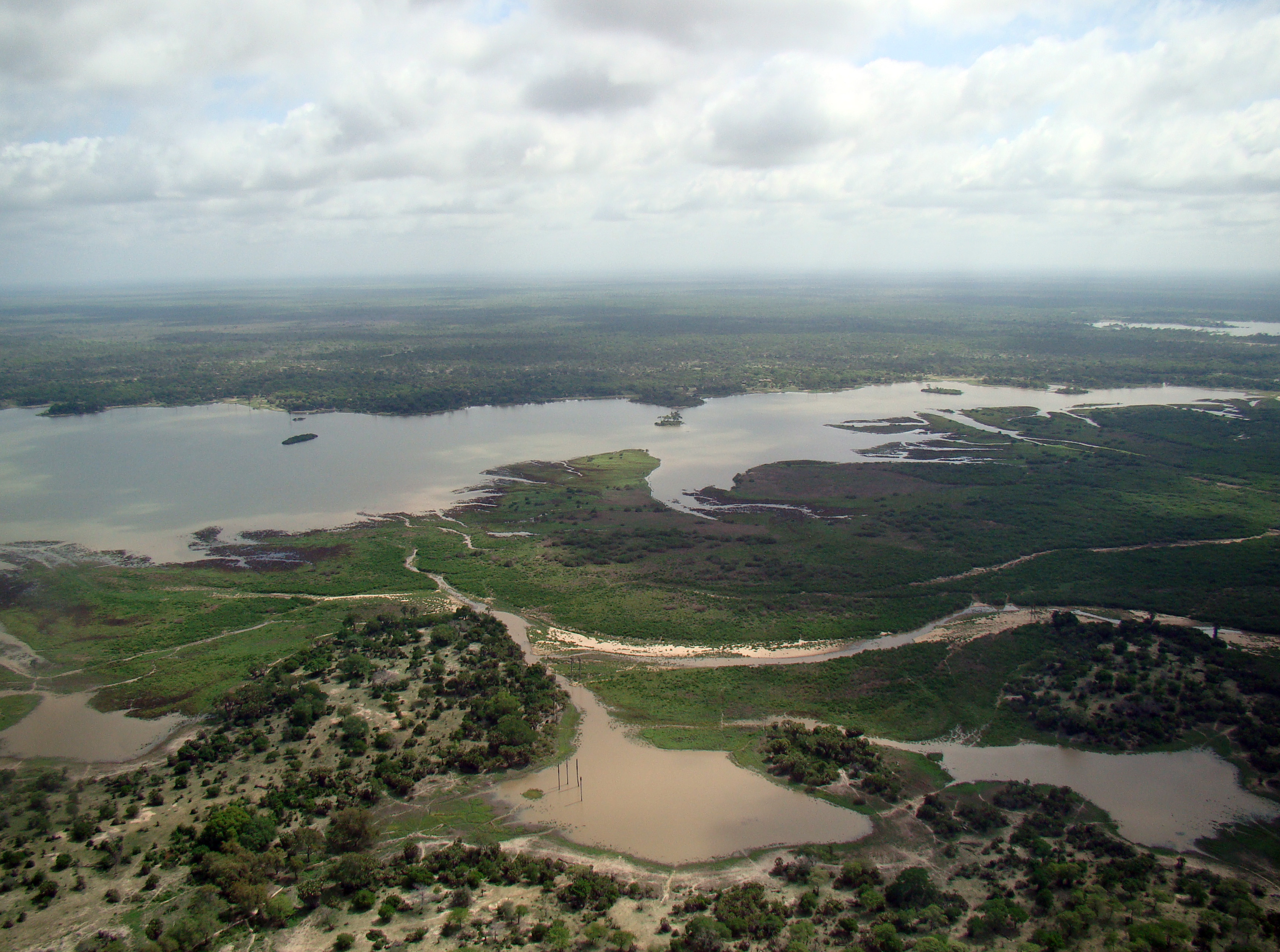

- Location within Tanzania
- Location: Location in Tanzania
- Nearest city: Morogoro City
- Coordinates: 9°0′S 37°24′E
- Area: 30,893 km^{2} (11,928 sq mi)
- Established: 2019
- Governing body: Tanzania National Parks Authority
- Website: tanzaniaparks.com/national_parks/nyerere-national-park

Nyerere National Park (formerly the northern part of Selous Game Reserve, pronunciation: "Seluu") (Hifadhi ya Taifa ya Nyerere, in Swahili) is a national park of Tanzania and is the largest national park in Tanzania and also one of the world's largest wildlife sanctuaries and national parks. The total area of the park is 30,893 km^{2} (11,928 sq mi) and covers a big part of Liwale District in the western Lindi Region, southwestern Pwani Region, northeastern Ruvuma Region and a big part of the southeastern Morogoro Region. The park is about the size of Belgium (Europe). Much of the area is in a wild state without being altered by human activities. The part of Selous game reserve is now running a hydro electric power. The park has a great river known as Rufiji River which is basically a source of water where dams for generation of electricity are located. Rufiji river is Tanzania's largest river and is home to many crocodiles and hippopotamuses. It is also one of largest mangrove forests in the world located at its delta with tree species including Rhizophora mucronata, Sonneratia alba and Avicenia marina.

== History ==
The original Selous Game Reserve traces its roots to 1896 when the then German Governor of Tanganyika proclaimed this vast area as a protected wildlife hunting reserve. Sometime in 1922 the reserve was named after Frederick Selous, a big game hunter turned wildlife conservationist. In 2019, it was decided by the Government of Tanzania that to further develop and enhance tourism in Selous, the northern part of the reserve will be excised to form the a new national park to be known as the Nyerere National Park, in honor of the first President of Tanzania, Mwalimu Julius Kambarage Nyerere. This new park was formally gazetted as a National Park in 2019 and now falls under the administration of TANAPA (Tanzania National Parks Authority ).

== Fauna and flora ==
Nyerere National Park has a high level of biodiversity, with the most iconic African species all inhabiting the region in some capacity, including lions, leopards, Masai giraffe, herds of wildebeest and plains zebra, black rhinoceros, impala, Thomson's gazelle, spotted hyenas, countless birds, small mammals, reptiles, amphibians, fishes and invertebrates. A large number of hippopotamus and Nile crocodiles inhabit the waters of the Rufiji River. Most notably, the park is known for its prolific population of endangered African wild dogs.

In the mid-1970s, Selous Game Reserve (and, by extension, Nyerere National Park) was home to a large number of elephants and rhinos, with estimates on the total number of elephants being over 100,000. Unfortunately, due to poor protection at the time, stealthy poachers have naturally found ways inside, and the animals' numbers dropped 66% just from 2009-2013, to around 13,000 elephants. It is now hoped that converting part of the reserve to an official National Park status will help control and minimize poaching.

== Getting there ==
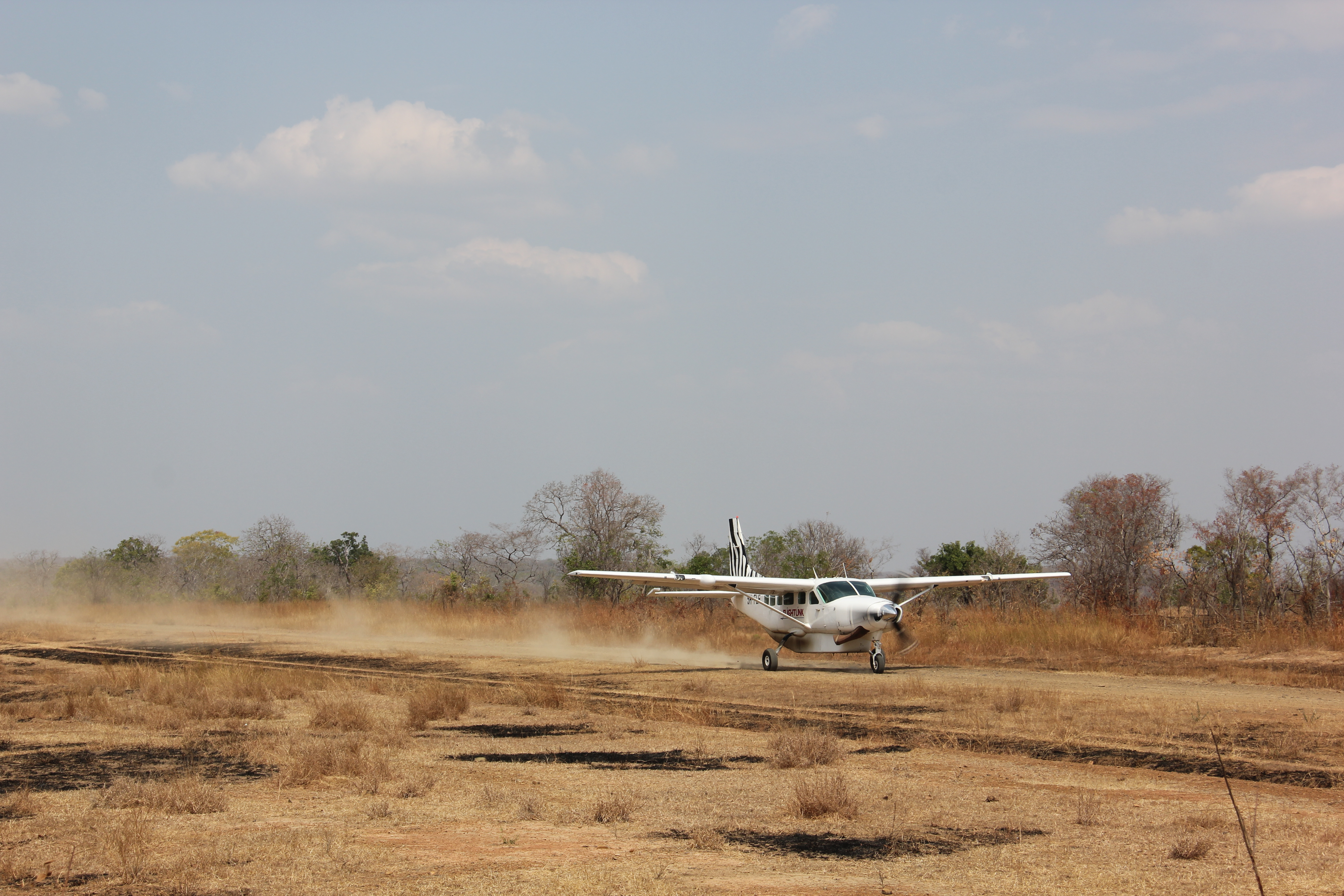
Airstrip in Nyerere National Park.

Nyerere National Park can be accessed by road safari from either Dar es Salaam or Arusha. The road distance from Dar es Salaam varies from 184 km to 230 km and from Arusha between 738 km and 763 km depending on which gate or entry point of Nyerere National Park you want to access. In terms of journey time, typically you want to allow for 6 hours for most Park entry gates such as Mtemere and Matambwe, and up to 6 to 6.5 hours for gates on the northern side of Selous Game Reserve. Road conditions are poor in places with the last 75 km to the park being on a bumpy gravel road.

The park can also be accessed by air. There are daily scheduled flights from either Dar es Salaam and Zanzibar with a flight time of under an hour to a variety of different airstrips in Nyerere. There are several airlines serving this route, including Regional Air, Coastal Aviation, Safari Air Link and Auric Air.

To avoid unnecessary and costly long transfers, all visitors planning for a fly-in safari to Nyerere National Park should verify which airstrip in Nyerere Park to use when booking their flights. Some of the most common airstrips include Mtemere, Matambwe, Sumbazi, Kiba, Beho Beho and Siwandu.

== Gallery ==
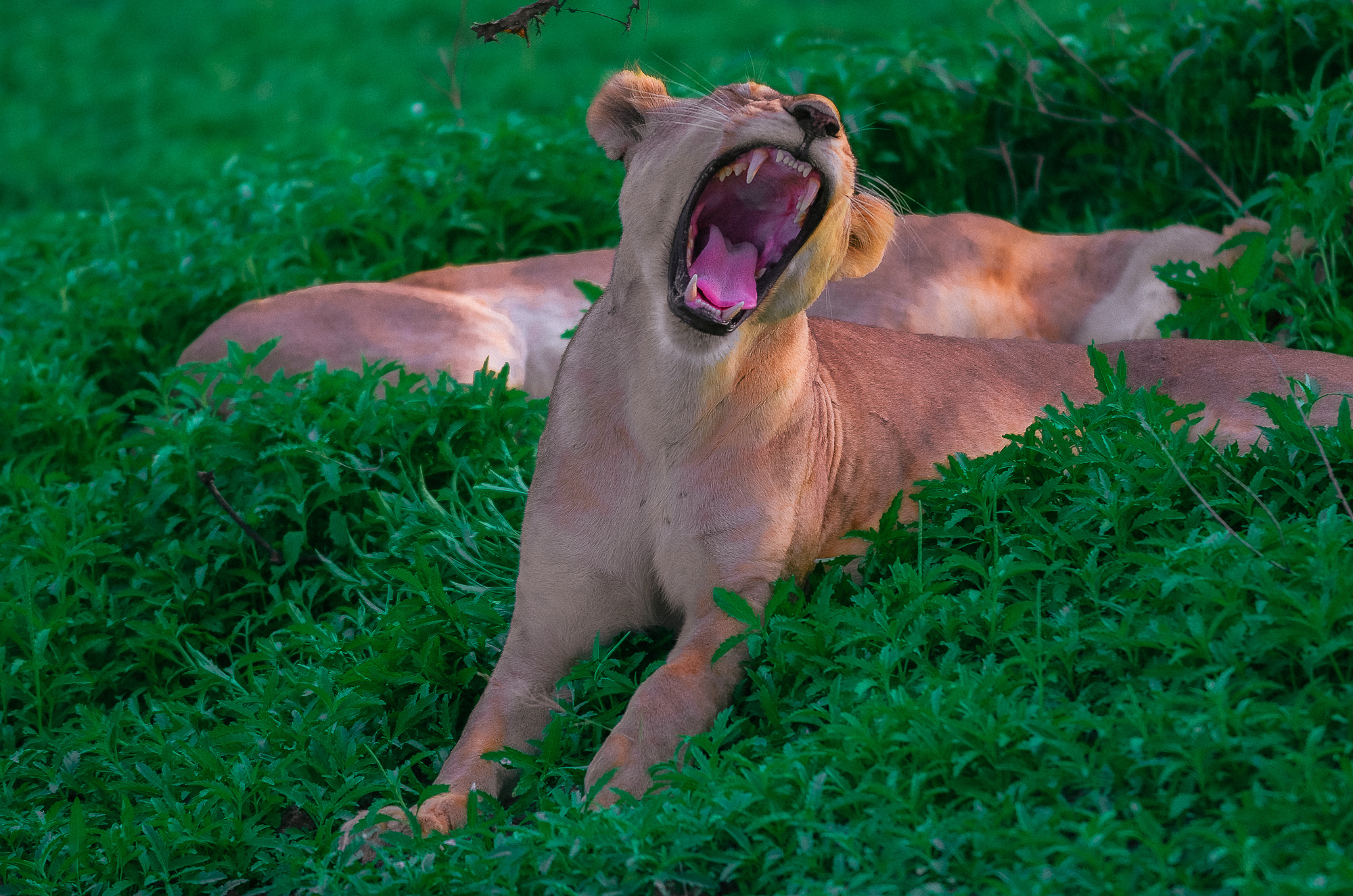
African lion

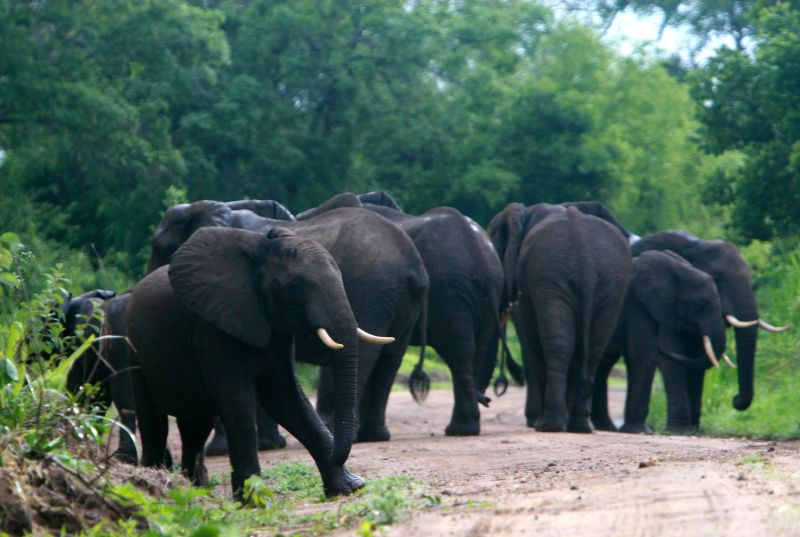
African bush elephant

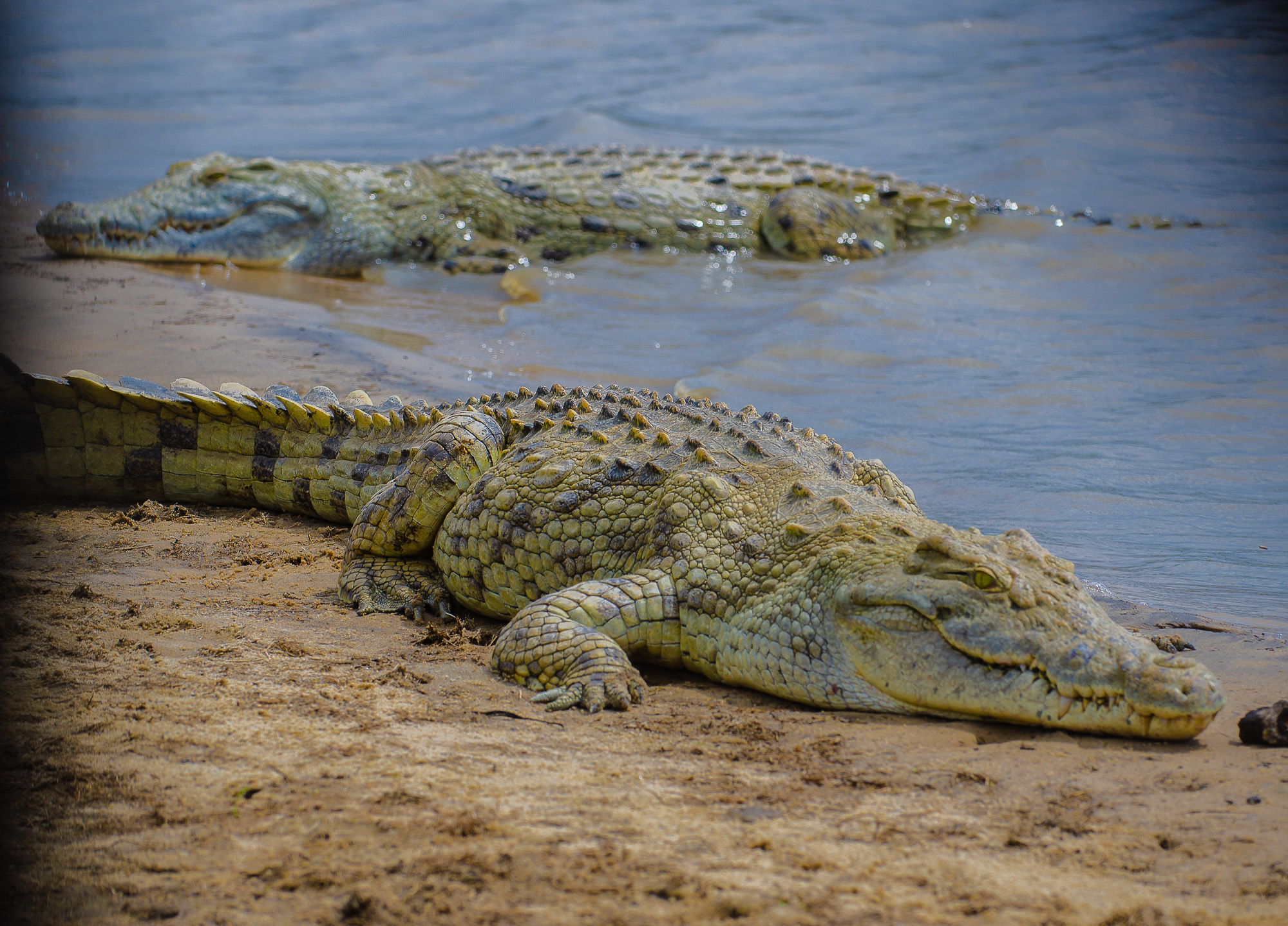
Nile crocodile

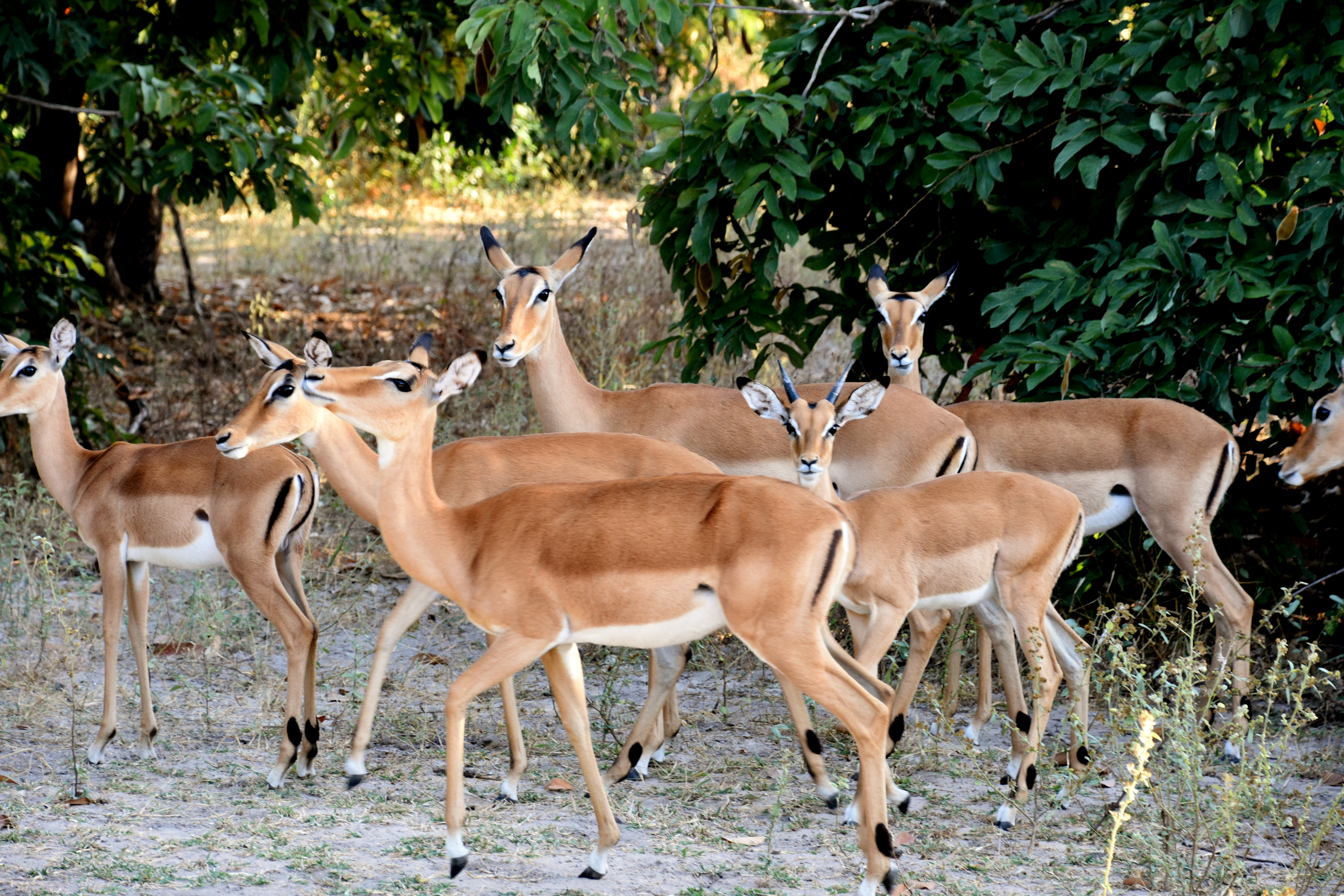
Impala

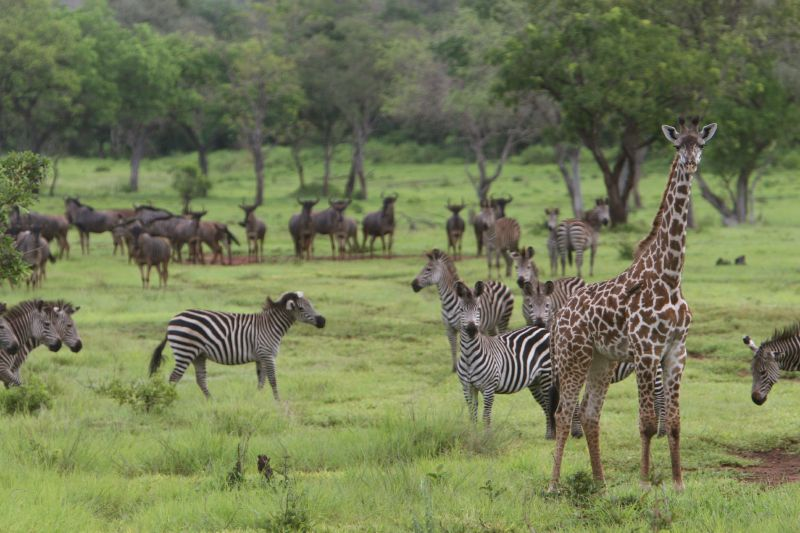
Masai giraffe, plains zebra and blue gnu

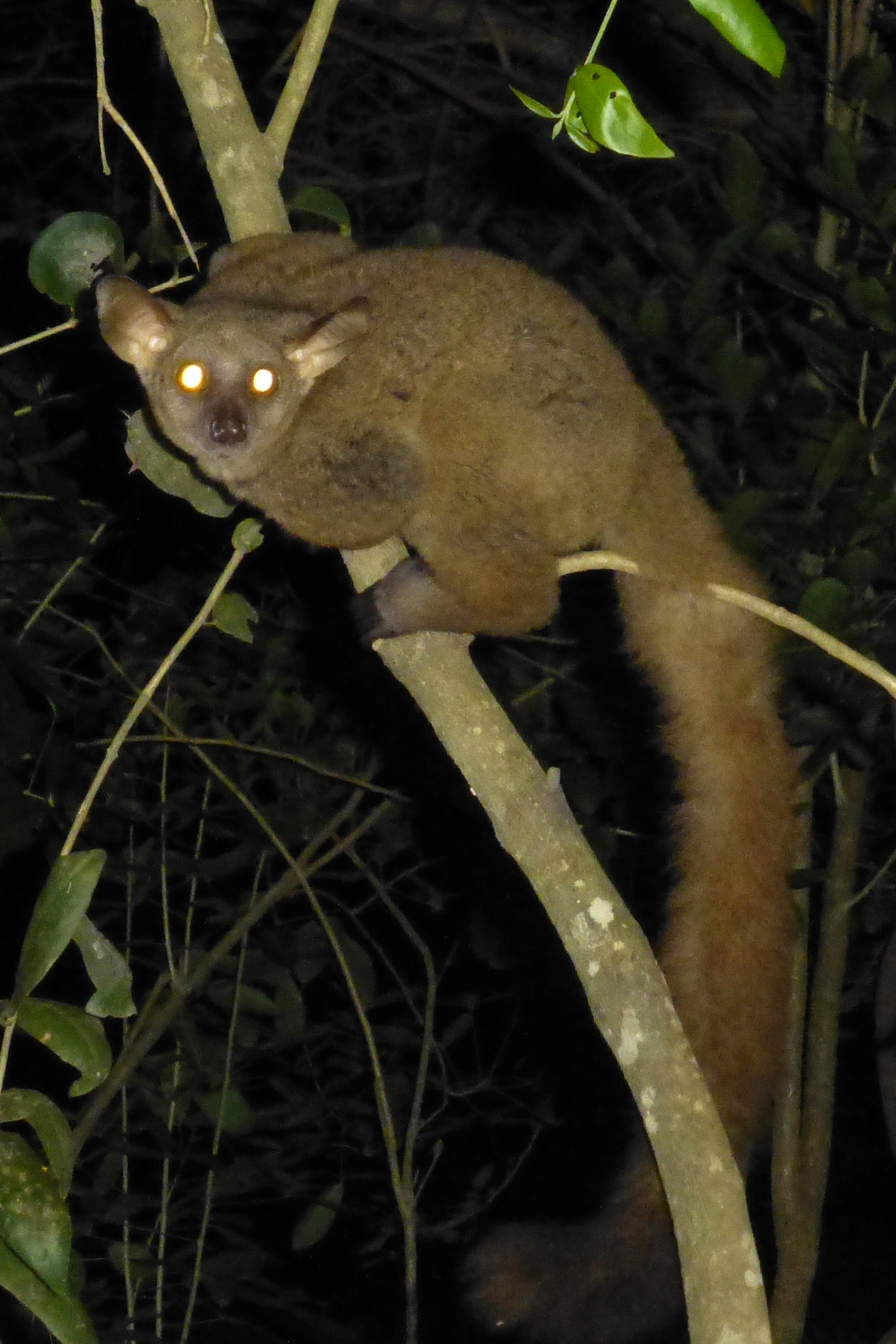
Brown greater galago

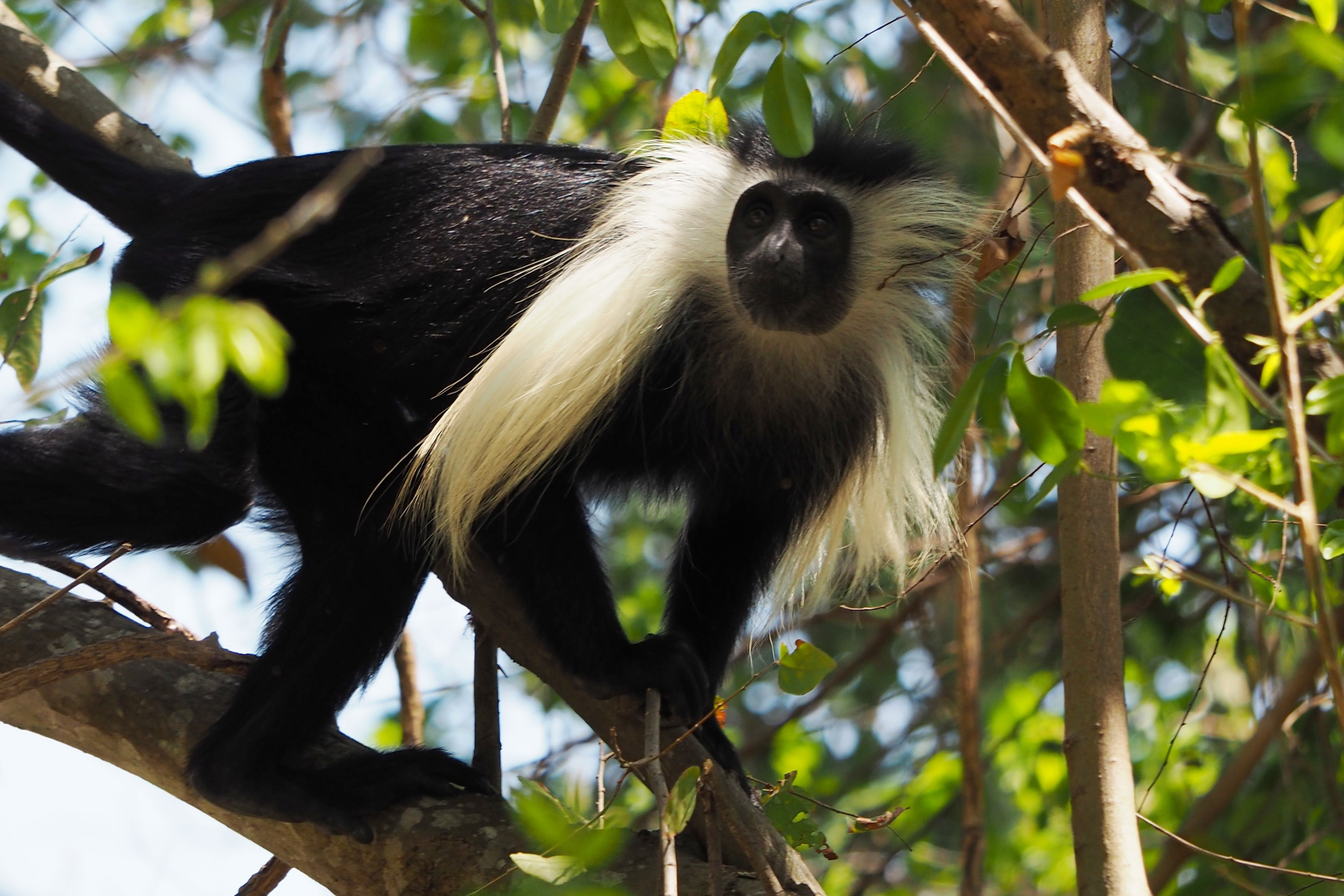
Angola colobus

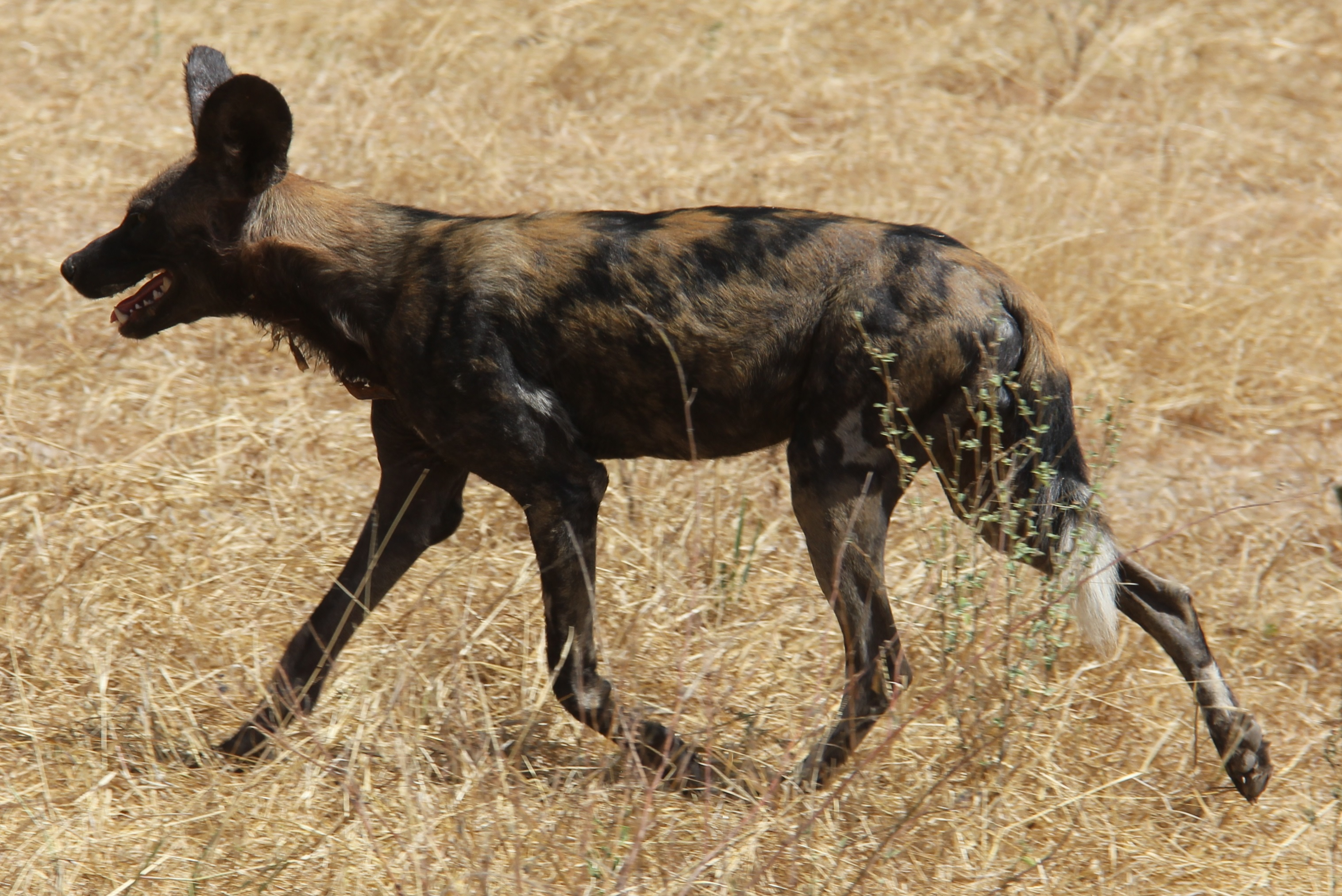
African wild dog

== See also ==
- Selous Game Reserve
- List of protected areas of Tanzania
