= Ndutu cranium =

Hominin fossil

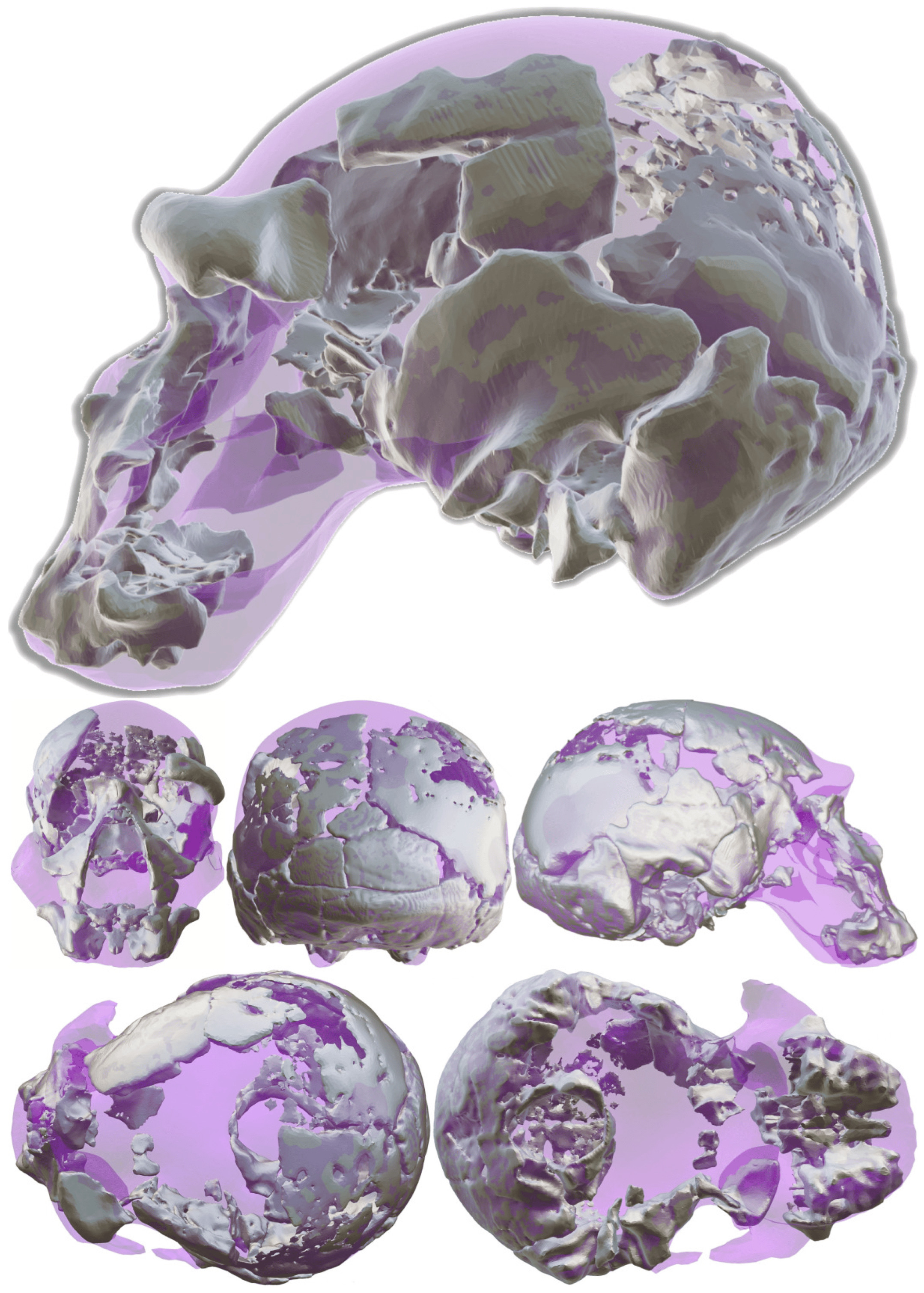
- Digital reconstruction by Montiel and Lorenzo (2023).
- Common name: Ndutu cranium
- Species: Homo, species uncertain
- Age: 450±40 ka
- Place discovered: Lake Ndutu
- Date discovered: September and October 1973
- Discovered by: Amini Mturi

The Ndutu skull is the partial cranium of a hominin that has been assigned variously to late Homo erectus, Homo rhodesiensis, and early Homo sapiens, from the Middle Pleistocene, found at Lake Ndutu in northern Tanzania.

== Discovery ==
Lake Ndutu is a seasonal soda lake in the Serengeti, adjacent to Lake Masek and the Main Gorge at Olduvai. During September and October 1973, Amini Aza Mturi and the Tanzanian Department of Antiquities conducted an excavation of the exposed flats of the western shoreline of Lake Ndutu. The excavation site was approximately 140 m^{2} (1,500 sq ft) in area and had considerable amounts of lithic and faunal material on the surface; the Ndutu cranium was found on the first occupational floor of the site. Amini Aza Mturi's excavation found 270 lithic and faunal materials in the first occupational floor of the excavation site, of which 20 were definitive tools. The tools were mainly spheroids and hammerstones, with six flakes (three regular flakes, two triangular, one rectangular). Amini Aza Mturi noticed the absence of Acheulean tools during his excavation, despite the cranial features of the skull being associated with the Acheulean industry. However, hand axes were later discovered during later visits to the site.

According to Amini Aza Mturi, preliminary chronometric dating and racemization of bone found in the first occupational level has yielded a general age of 500,000 and 600,000 years. Other estimates based on the association of the Ndutu deposits with the Masek Beds at Olduvai suggest an age approaching 400,000 years.

== Reconstruction and analysis ==
=== Initial state of specimen ===
The occipital was well preserved and almost completely intact. The temporals were damaged; the left temporal was more complete than the right temporal. The parietals were shattered; the majority of the right parietal was reconstructed, along with fragments of the left parietal. The frontal was mostly gone, a small piece of the right side above the brow ridge remained. The central region of the face includes much of the nasal aperture, part of the left nasal bone, part of the orbital rims with the lacrimal grooves, parts of the sphenoid, and much of the right orbital plate. Part of the right side of the face is preserved down to the infraorbital foramen, and on the left side there is a part that goes down to the palate, where the roots for the left canine, P3, P4, M1, and M2 are found.

=== Reconstruction ===
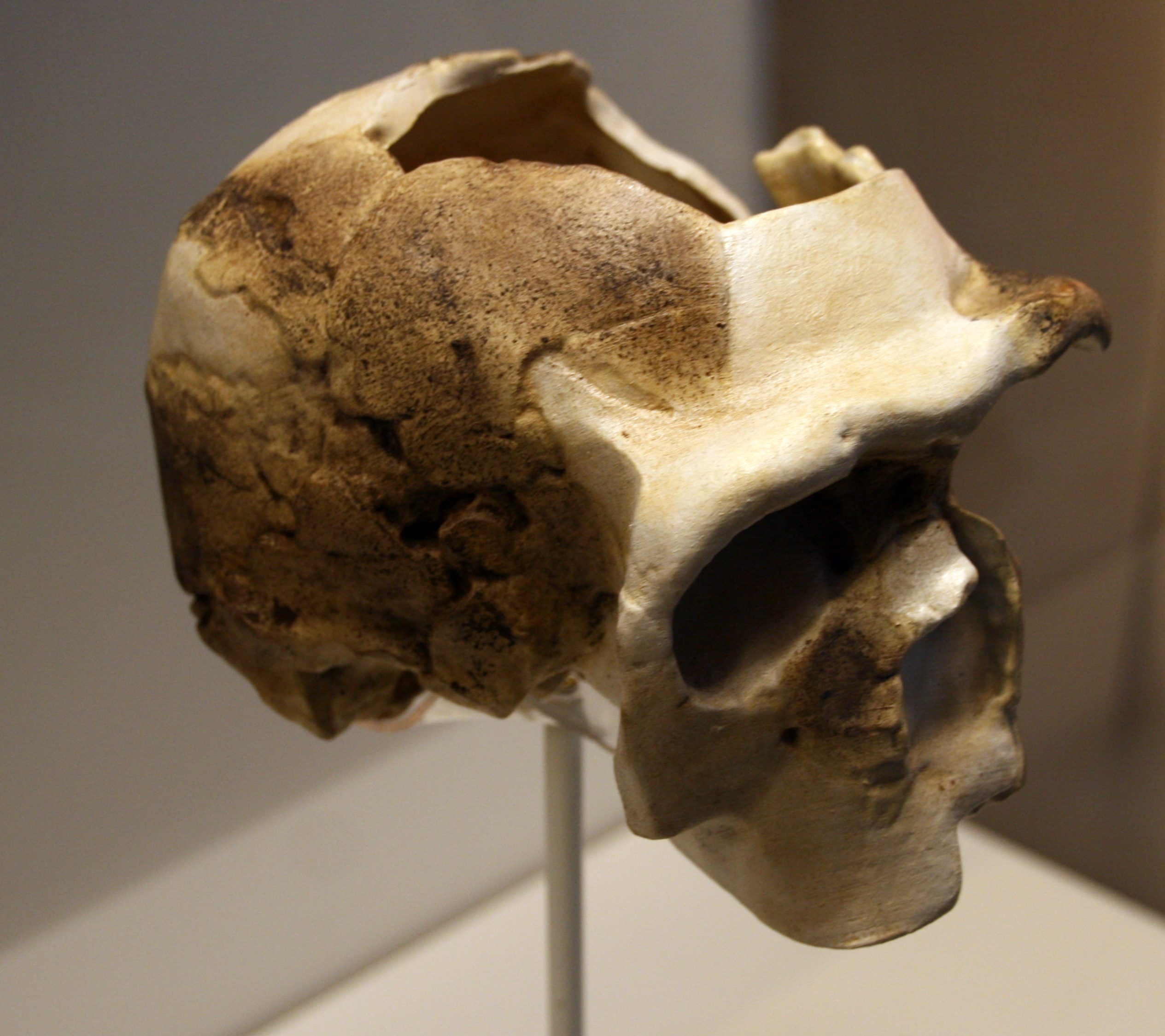
Ndutu Fossil Replica based on the now inaccurate, Clarke reconstruction.

The Ndutu cranium was badly damaged and fragmented when it was found. The pieces of the skull were repaired and reconstructed by Ronald J. Clarke who authored the initial description in 1976. Gustavo Montiel and Carlos Lorenzo (2023) note that Clarke's initial reconstruction, which was reformed by hand, was littered with technical errors that are more accurately fixed by modern technology, including retrodeformation, three dimensional assembly, and reflection. After having realized that the morphology of the specimen matched Sima de los Huesos (SH) 5 from Spain, Ndutu was fully reconstructed. In their study, they state that they intend their work as a founding for future phylogenetic studies, of which this specimen is rarely included in.

=== Anatomy ===
The occipital has a well-developed nuchal torus that gives the skull an angulated lateral contour similar to Homo erectus. The mastoid process is small, and its posterior part is flat and lies in the nuchal plane, particularly similar to Olduvai hominids 9 and 12. The frontal bone has an almost vertical forehead, similar to Homo erectus, but unlike the Ngangdong or the Broken Hill crania. The walls of the frontal, occipital, parietals, and temporals, were very thick. Where it is similar to H. sapiens, the sides of the braincase are more vertical when viewed from the back. The right tympanic plate has an ossified styloid process. There appears to be no sagittal torus. The supramastoid crest does not extend over the external acoustic meatus. G. Philip Rightmire stressed Ndutu's affinities to archaic H. sapiens and even proposed its allocation to a subspecies of it. The updated reconstruction of Ndutu suggests that the specimen has a more prognathic face, a narrower vault and a brow that projects less and is narrower than Clarke's reconstruction. Their updated morphological evaluation reveals that the parietal bosses previously used to support allocation to H. sapiens are not present. The sagittal profile is similar to Broken Hill.

== Controversy ==
According to Clarke, the Ndutu skull seemed to form a link between Homo erectus and archaic Homo sapiens, due to it having certain features in common with both and was granted classification as Homo erectus. G. Philip Rightmire disagreed with this classification, and believed that its features suggested that it was more similar to the African fossils referred to as archaic Homo sapiens. According to Rightmire, the length and breadth dimensions of the Ndutu cranium are similar to earlier Homo erectus fossils from Koobi Fora and Illeret, while its size is more similar to OH 12 than OH 9. Based on the occipital morphology, mastoid shape, glenoid cavity, and tympanic plate of the Ndutu hominid, Rightmire claims that the fossil hominids it most resembles are Broken Hill, Elandsfontein, and other archaic Homo sapiens found in Africa. Chris Stringer classifies the cranium as belonging to Homo heidelbergensis/Homo rhodesiensis (a species considered to be intermediate between Homo erectus and Homo sapiens) rather than as early H. sapiens, but considers it to display a "more sapiens-like zygomaxillary morphology" than certain other examples of Homo rhodesiensis. In later work, he details it as a sole sister to the Neanderthal and another group containing the Steinheim skull, plus a group related to Homo antecessor, Homo longi, and Homo sapiens, and Montiel and Lorenzo (2023) found very strong morphological similarity with SH 5.

== See also ==
- List of human evolution fossils
