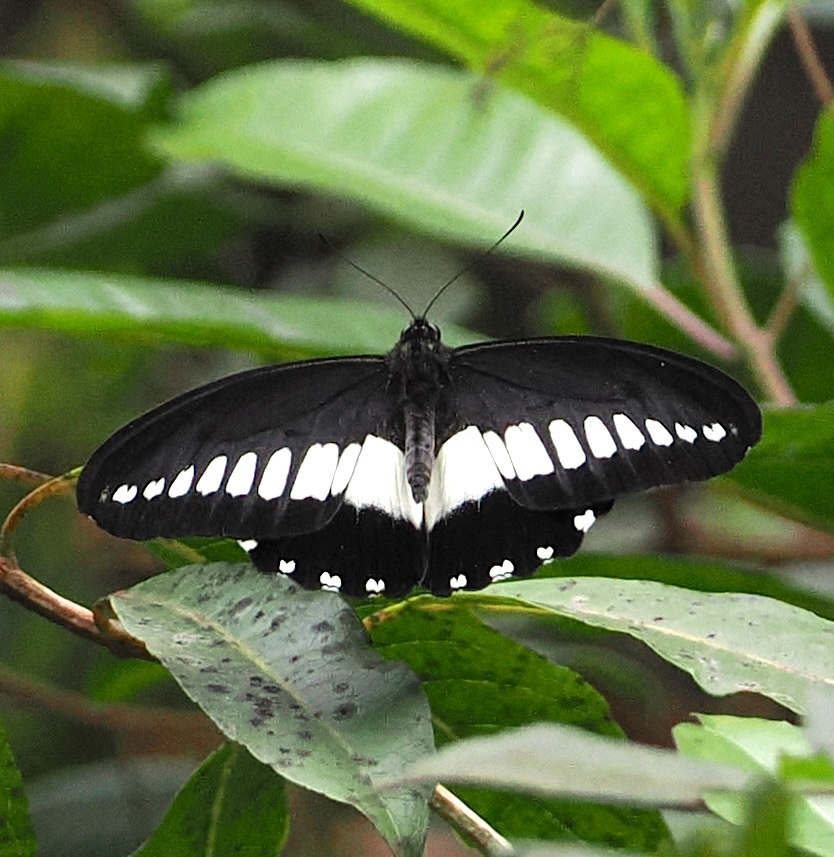
- Upperside
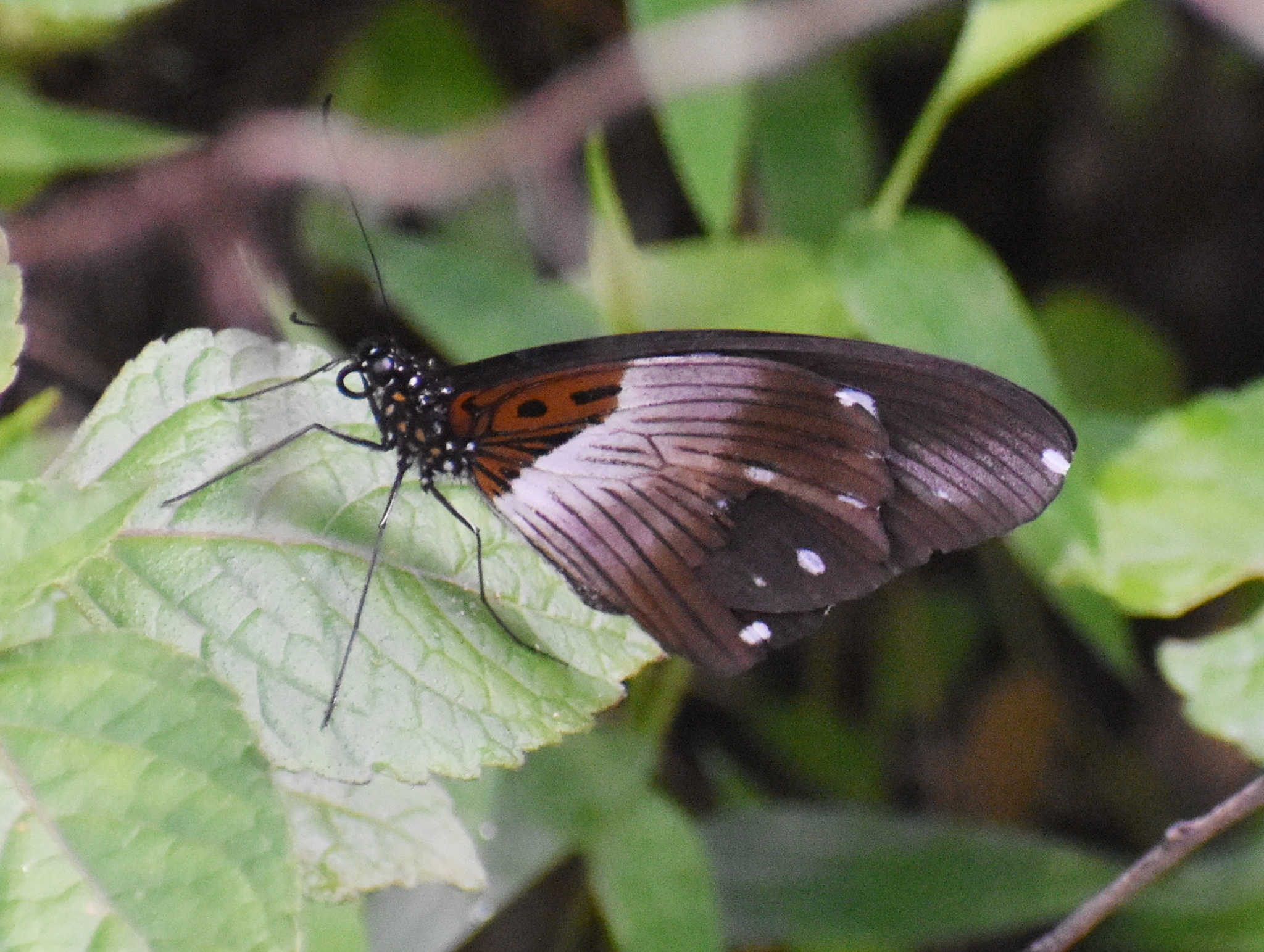
- Underside

Scientific classification
- Kingdom: Animalia
- Phylum: Arthropoda
- Clade: Pancrustacea
- Class: Insecta
- Order: Lepidoptera
- Family: Papilionidae
- Genus: Papilio
- Species: P. echerioides

Binomial name
- Papilio echerioides Trimen, 1868

Synonyms
- Druryia echerioides; Papilio homeyeri Plötz, 1880; Papilio neumanni Karsch, 1895; Papilio tanganikae Oberthür, 1897; Papilio zoroastres neumanni ab. subtanganikae Strand, 1916; Papilio zoroastres neumanni ab. zoroastrides Strand, 1916; Papilio zoroastres joiceyi Gabriel, 1945; Papilio zoroastres f. pallidochrea Stoneham, 1944; Papilio zoroastres joycei f. nioka Berger, 1974; Papilio echerioides var. wertheri Karsch, 1898; Papilio echerioides rideschi Suffert, 1904; Papilio echerioides rectofasciata Kielland, 1990; Papilio zoroastres Druce, 1878; Papilio preussius Karsch, 1893; Papilio zoroastres ab. zoroastroides Strand, 1914; Papilio zoroastres ab. sapponis Strand, 1914; Papilio zoroastres barnsi Gabriel, 1945; Papilio echerioides gabrieli Gauthier, 1984

= Papilio echerioides =

White-banded swallowtail

Species of butterfly

Papilio echerioides, the white-banded swallowtail, is a butterfly of the family Papilionidae. It is found in Sub-Saharan Africa.

The wingspan is 65–75 mm. It has two flight periods, first from January to March and second from September to November.

The larvae feed on Clausena inaequalis, Toddalia lanceolata, Toddalia asiatica, Zanthoxylum capense, Zanthoxylum delagoense, Vepris lanceolata and Citrus species.

== Description ==
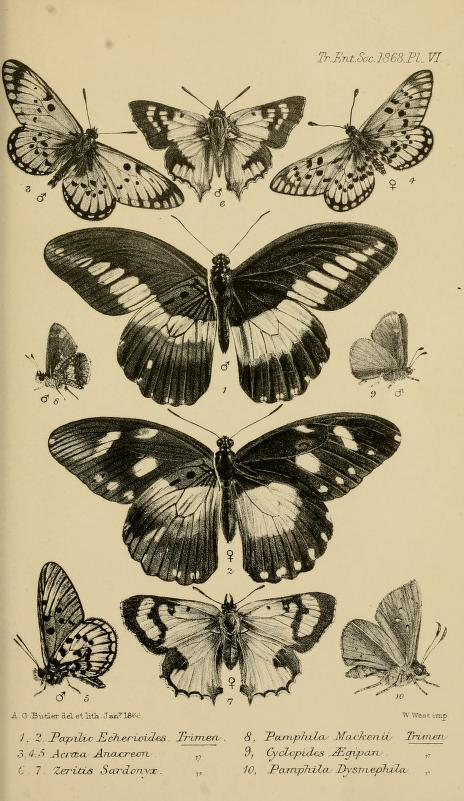
Image that accompanied the original description

The male is very similar to Papilio cynorta, but the median band, which is very pale yellow, tapers more strongly towards the apex. The pale spot in area (cell) 6 of the forewing is always present (usually absent in P. cynorta). The female is a mimic of the butterflies Amauris echeria and Amauris albimaculata. The forewing is black with white spots, the hindwing black with a large pale ochreous discal area and white submarginal spots.

== Taxonomy ==
Papilio echerioides is a member of the echerioides species group. This clade includes:

- Papilio echerioides Trimen, 1868
- Papilio fuelleborni Karsch, 1900
- Papilio jacksoni Sharpe, 1891
- Papilio sjoestedti Aurivillius, 1908

== Subspecies ==
Listed alphabetically:

- P. e. ambangulu Clifton & Collins, 1997 (Tanzania)
- P. e. chirindanus van Son, 1956 (Mozambique (Mount Gorongosa), eastern Zimbabwe)
- P. e. echerioides Trimen, 1868 (South Africa, Eswatini)
- P. e. homeyeri Plötz, 1880 (Angola, Democratic Republic of the Congo, south-western Tanzania, northern Zambia)
- P. e. joiceyi Gabriel, 1945 – Zoroaster swallowtail – (Sudan, Uganda, western Kenya, western Tanzania, Rwanda, Democratic Republic of the Congo)
- P. e. kiellandi Clifton & Collins, 1997 (southern Kenya, northern Tanzania)
- P. e. leucospilus Rothschild, 1902 .(Ethiopia: highlands south-east of Rift Valley)
- P. e. nioka (Berger, 1974) (Democratic Republic of the Congo)
- P. e. nyiro Carcasson, 1962 (Kenya)
- P. e. oscari Rothschild, 1902 (Ethiopia: highlands west of the Rift Valley)
- P. e. pseudowertheri Kielland, 1990 (eastern and south-eastern Tanzania)
- P. e. shirensis (Hancock, 1987) (Malawi)
- P. e. wertheri Karsch, 1898 (eastern Kenya, eastern and northern Tanzania)
- P. e. zoroastres Druce, 1878(Cameroon)
