= Amini Aza Mturi =

Tanzanian archaeologist

Amini Aza Mturi was a Tanzanian archaeologist and director of the Tanzanian Division of Antiquities between 1968 and 1981. He has been described as "one of the founding fathers of archaeology in Tanzania".

== Education and career ==
Mturi studied history at Makerere University and archaeology and conservation at the Institute of Archaeology in London. He joined the Tanzanian Division of Antiquities in 1966, as an assistant conservator. In 1968, he succeeded Hamo Sassoon as its acting director, which was made a permanent appointment in 1970. He was the first African to hold the post; the previous directors Neville Chittick and Hamo Sassoon were part of the British colonial administration. He also helped establish archaeology at the University of Dar es Salaam and he served as chairperson of UNESCO's Bureau of the World Heritage Committee (9th session, 1985).

Mturi had a long association with the Leakey family and their excavations at Olduvai Gorge. He first met Louis Leakey at a conference in 1967, describing a "frustrating first encounter" where Louis refused to let him work at Olduvai, perhaps worried about training an African archaeologist who might replace him. Nevertheless, Mturi wrote a positive obituary of Louis Leakey in 1974, describing him as having "contributed greatly to the protection and preservation of [Tanzania's] archaeological sites". He had a better relationship with Mary Leakey, Louis' wife and successor at Olduvai, and went on to deliver the keynote lecture at a conference held in her honour in 1994. Mary recounted that Mturi often visited Olduvai to check on the foreign researchers there, and under his direction the Division of Antiquities took over its administration, replacing the Leakeys' Kenyan staff with Tanzanian guards and guides. The Aguirre-Mturi Research Station at Olduvai Gorge is named jointly for Mturi and Spanish palaeoanthropologist Emiliano Aguirre.

Mturi directed excavations at Lake Ndutu, where a considerable amount of lithic and faunal materials were uncovered, as well as the Ndutu cranium. He was also involved in discussions on the conservation of Bagamoyo, arguing that socioeconomic development should not happen at the expense of cultural heritage.

== Selected publications ==
- Mturi, A. A., 1976. New hominid from Lake Ndutu. Nature 262: 284–285.
- Mturi, A. A., 1986. The pastoral neolithic of west Kilimanjaro. Azania 21: 53–63.
- Mturi, A. A. 1987. The archaeological sites of Lake Natron, Tanzania. Azania XXI: 56–63.
- Mturi, A. A. 1996. Whose cultural heritage? Conflicts and contradictions in the conservation of historic structures, towns and rock art in Tanzania. In Peter R. Schmidt and Rodrick J. Mclntosh (eds.) Plundering Africa's Past. London: Currey.
- Mturi, A. A., 1998. Archaeology of Tanzania: a teaching manual for the Open University of Tanzania. Dar es Salaam: Open University of Tanzania.
- Mturi, A. A., 2005. State of rescue archaeology in Tanzania. In Mapunda, B and P. Msemwa (eds.), Salvaging Tanzania's cultural heritage. Dar es Salaam: Dar es Salaam University Press, pp. 293–210.
