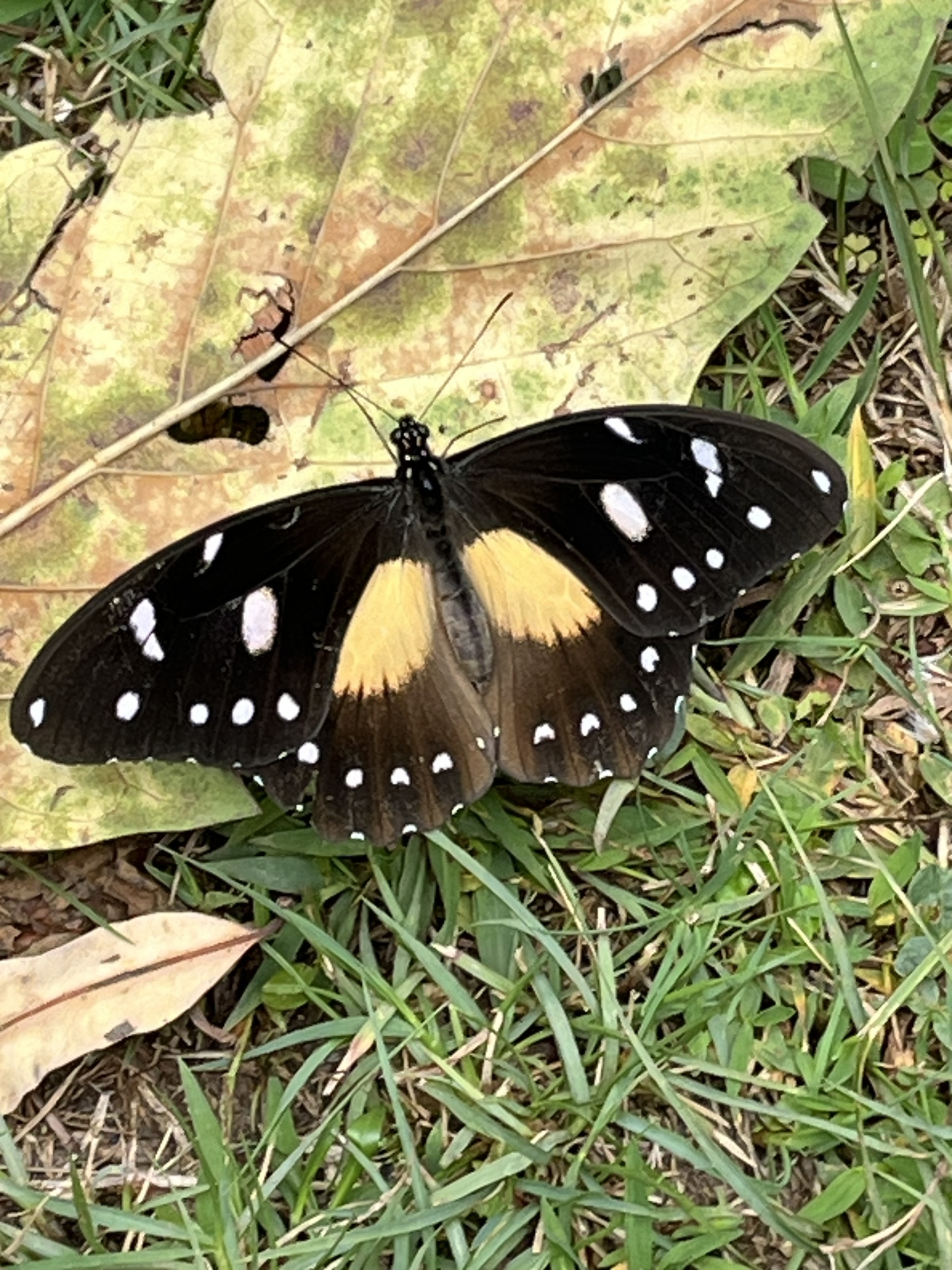
- Female
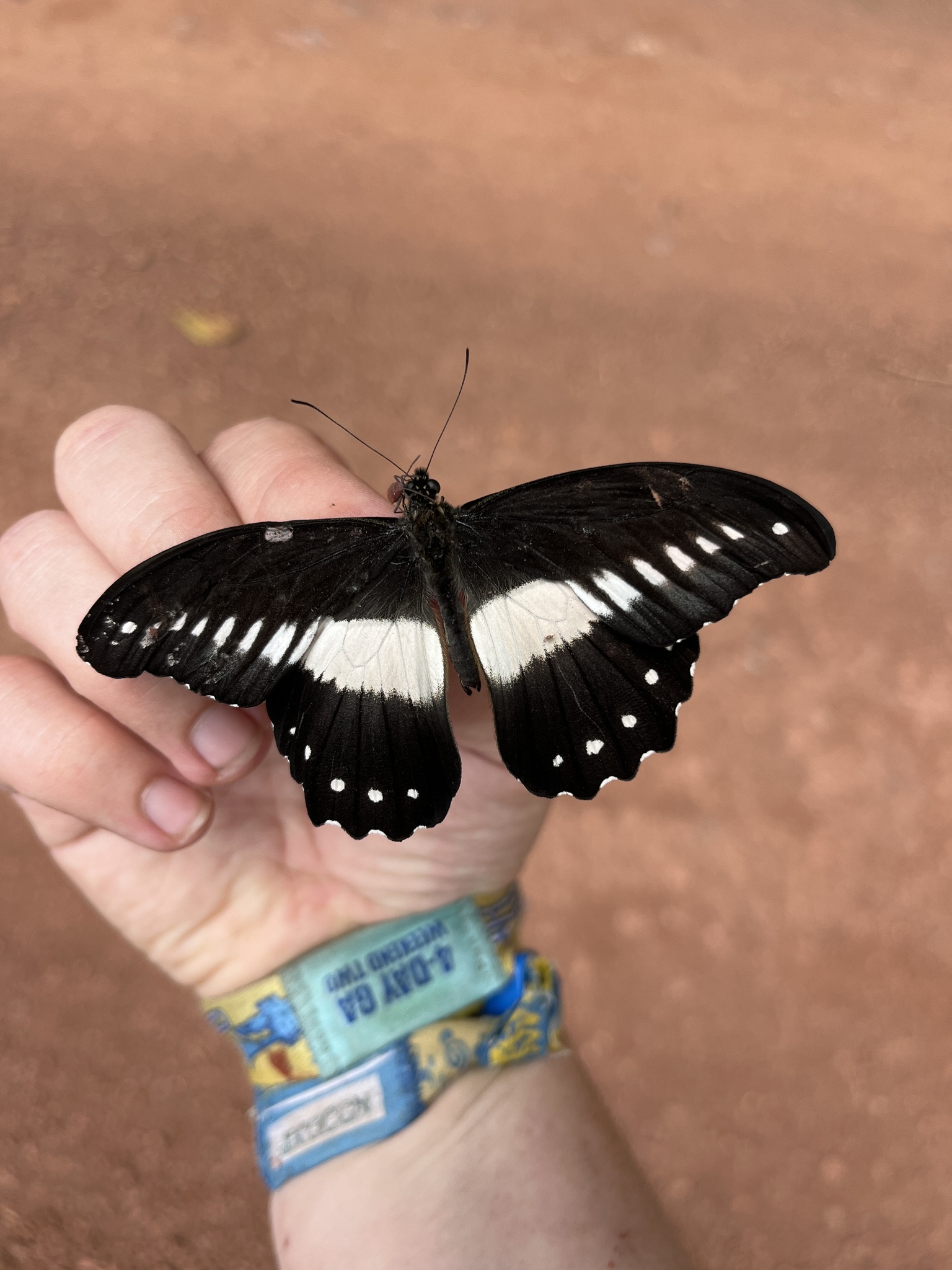
- Male

Scientific classification
- Kingdom: Animalia
- Phylum: Arthropoda
- Clade: Pancrustacea
- Class: Insecta
- Order: Lepidoptera
- Family: Papilionidae
- Genus: Papilio
- Species: P. jacksoni

Binomial name
- Papilio jacksoni Sharpe, 1891

Synonyms
- Druryia jacksoni; Papilio jacksoni f. multimaculata Stoneham, 1951

= Papilio jacksoni =

Species of butterfly

Papilio jacksoni, the Jackson's swallowtail, is a butterfly of the family Papilionidae. It is found in Africa.

The female adults mimic Amauris echeria and relatives.

The larvae feed on Clausena, Toddalia and Clausena anisata.

== Description ==
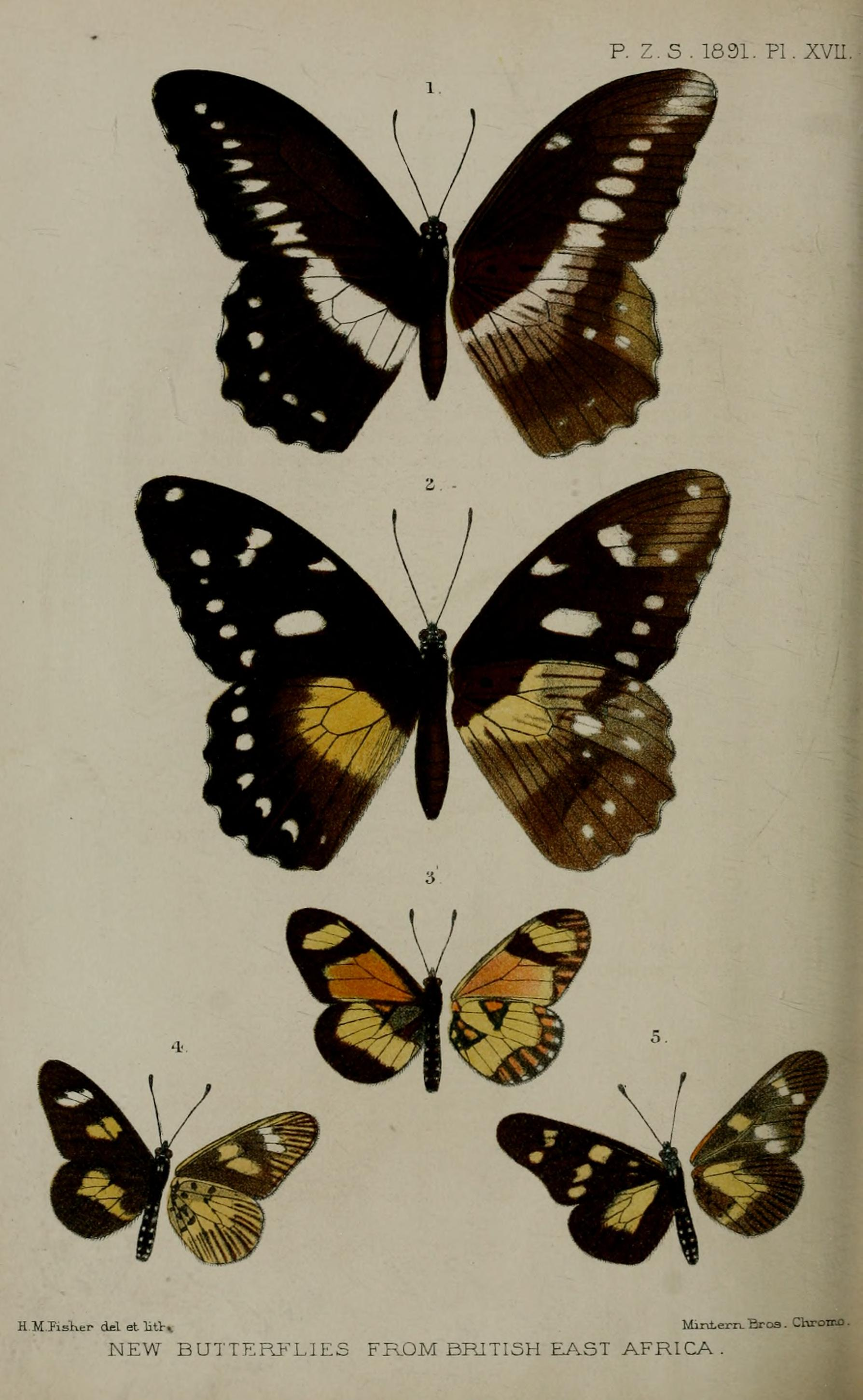
Emily Sharpe's illustration of the male (figure 1) and female (figure 2) of Papilio jacksoni in the Proceedings of the Zoological Society of London

"Male as in ssp. echerioides, but black more sooty, median band narrower, reduced to very well separated spots in forewing, white with faint ochreous tinge. Female as in echerioides, but white apical spot does not touch the margin; white spots in hindwing in both sexes well inside margin." (Robert Herbert Carcasson, 1960).

== Subspecies ==
- Papilio jacksoni jacksoni (Kenya (highlands), eastern Uganda)
- Papilio jacksoni ruandana Le Cerf, 1924 (Zaire, eastern Uganda, Rwanda, Burundi)
- Papilio jacksoni hecqui Berger, 1954 (north-eastern Zaire)
- Papilio jacksoni kungwe Cottrell, 1963 (western Tanzania)
- Papilio jacksoni nyika Cottrell, 1963 (Nyika Plateau in northern Malawi and eastern Zambia)
- Papilio jacksoni imatonga Clifton & Collins, 1997 (Imatong Mountains in south-western Sudan)

== Taxonomy ==
Papilio jacksoni is a member of the echerioides species group. This clade includes:

- Papilio echerioides Trimen, 1868
- Papilio fuelleborni Karsch, 1900
- Papilio jacksoni Sharpe, 1891
- Papilio sjoestedti Aurivillius, 1908

== Etymology ==
It was named for the collector Frederick John Jackson in "Descriptions of New Butterflies collected by Mr. F. J. Jackson, F.Z.S:, in British East Africa, during his recent Expedition. Part I & II" Proceedings of the Zoological Society of London 1891 : 187-194, pl. 16-17, : 633-638, pl. 48.
