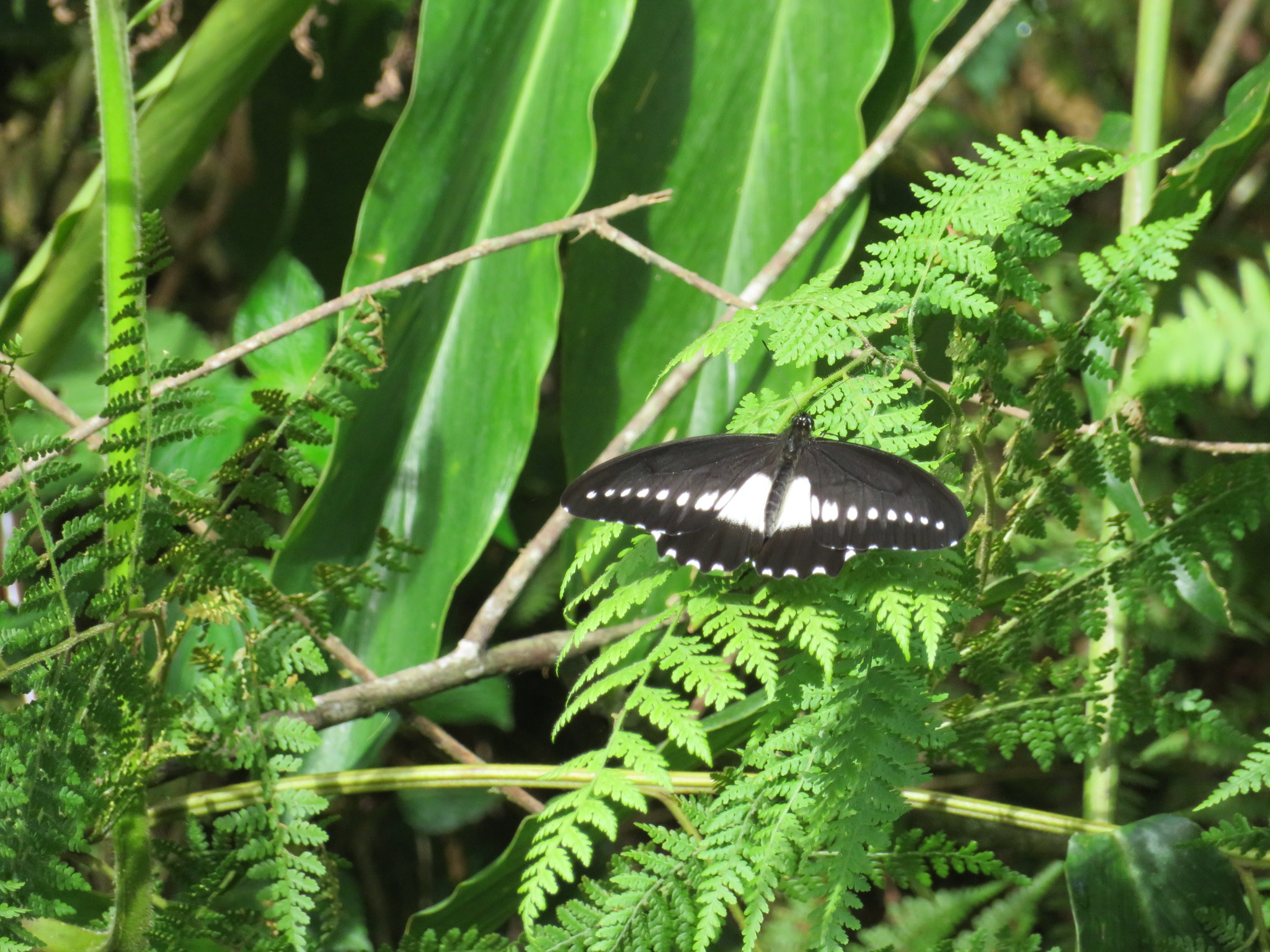

Scientific classification
- Kingdom: Animalia
- Phylum: Arthropoda
- Clade: Pancrustacea
- Class: Insecta
- Order: Lepidoptera
- Family: Papilionidae
- Genus: Papilio
- Species: P. fuelleborni

Binomial name
- Papilio fuelleborni Karsch, 1900

Synonyms
- Papilio fülleborni Karsch, 1900; Papilio sjöstedti Aurivillius, 1908; Papilio sjöstedti var. atavus Le Cerf, 1912; Papilio fuelleborni neocesa Kemal & Koçak, 2005

= Papilio fuelleborni =

Species of butterfly

Papilio fuelleborni is a species of swallowtail butterfly from the genus Papilio that is found in Tanzania and Malawi.

The larvae feed on Clausena species.

== Description ==
The male is deep black, with a pure white median band, very narrow in forewing, very wide in hindwing. The female is similar to other species of the group but with large white spots on the hindwing, placed at the margin (Carcasson, 1960).

== Subspecies ==
- Papilio fuelleborni fuelleborni (eastern and southern Tanzania, northern Malawi)
- Papilio fuelleborni sjoestedti Aurivillius, 1908 (northern Tanzania)
- Papilio fuelleborni atavus Le Cerf, 1912 (northern Tanzania)
- Papilio fuelleborni rydoni Kielland, 1987 (north-eastern Tanzania)

== Taxonomy ==
Papilio fuelleborni is a member of the echerioides species-group. This clade includes

- Papilio echerioides Trimen, 1868
- Papilio fuelleborni Karsch, 1900
- Papilio jacksoni Sharpe, 1891
- Papilio sjoestedti Aurivillius, 1908

== See also ==
- Friedrich Fülleborn
