= Taurotragus arkelli =

Taurotragus arkelli Temporal range: Pleistocene

Scientific classification
- Kingdom: Animalia
- Phylum: Chordata
- Class: Mammalia
- Order: Artiodactyla
- Family: Bovidae
- Subfamily: Bovinae
- Genus: Taurotragus
- Species: †T. arkelli

Binomial name
- †Taurotragus arkelli Leakey, 1965

Extinct species of bovid

Taurotragus arkelli is an extinct species of eland from Eastern Africa that lived during the Pleistocene.

== Description ==
Taurotragus arkelli was first described L.S.B. Leakey in 1965 from the Olduvai Gorge (Bed IV) in Tanzania. The material assigned to the species consists of a cranium and horn cores.

T. arkelli is regarded as the ancestor of the modern common eland. In comparison to modern eland, T. arkelli shows what are considered primitive characteristics for the genus, such as a longer braincase and horn cores slightly more upright.
