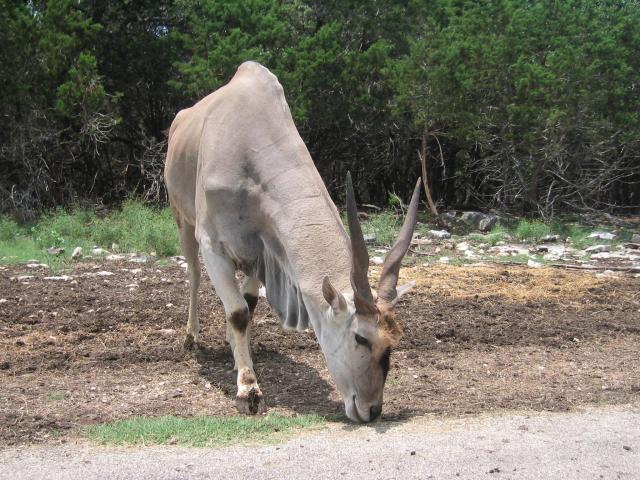
- Tragelaphus (Taurotragus) oryx

Scientific classification
- Kingdom: Animalia
- Phylum: Chordata
- Class: Mammalia
- Order: Artiodactyla
- Family: Bovidae
- Subfamily: Bovinae
- Genus: Tragelaphus
- Subgenus: Taurotragus; Wagner, 1855

Type species
- Antilope oreas Pallas, 1777

Species
- Common eland (Tragelaphus (Taurotragus) oryx) (Pallas, 1766); Giant eland (Tragelaphus (Taurotragus) derbianus) (Gray, 1847); †Taurotragus arkelli

= Taurotragus =

Elands

Subgenus of mammals

Taurotragus (/təˈrɒtrəɡəs/) is a subgenus of genus Tragelaphus. This subgenus consists of giant antelopes of the African savanna, commonly known as elands or impofu. This subgenus contains two species: the common eland Tragelaphus oryx and the giant eland Tragelaphus derbianus.

== Taxonomy ==
- - - - - - - Taurotragus
              - Giant eland
              - Common eland
            - - Strepsiceros
                Greater kudu
              - Tragelaphus
                - Mountain nyala
                - - - - Bongo
                      - Sitatunga
                    - - - - Cape bushbuck
                          - Harnessed bushbuck
          - Nyala
            Lowland nyala
        - Ammelaphus
          Lesser kudu

Phylogenetic relationships of the mountain nyala from combined analysis of all molecular data (Willows-Munro et.al. 2005). Subgenera (stem labels) per MDD.

The subgenus authority is the German zoologist Johann Andreas Wagner, who first mentioned it in the journal Die Säugthiere in Abbildungen nach der Natur, mit Beschreibungen in 1855. The name is composed of two Greek words: ταῦρος (taûros), meaning a "bull" or "bullock", and τράγος (trágos), meaning a "male goat"—in reference to the tuft of hair that grows in the eland's ear which resembles a goat's beard.

The subgenus consists of two species:

Genus Taurotragus – Wagner, 1855 – two species
Common name	Scientific name and subspecies	Range	Size and ecology	IUCN status and estimated population
Common eland	Tragelaphus (Taurotragus) oryx (Pallas, 1766) Three subspecies: T. o. livingstonii (Sclater, 1864) (Livingstone's eland): Found in the Central Zambezian miombo woodlands. It has a brown pelt with up to 12 stripes.; T. o. oryx (Pallas, 1766) (Cape eland): Found in south and southwest Africa. The coat is tawny, and adults lose their stripes.; T. o. pattersonianus (Lydekker, 1906) (East African eland or Patterson's eland): Found in east Africa. Its coat can have up to 12 stripes.	Angola, Botswana, the Democratic Republic of the Congo, Eswatini, Ethiopia, Kenya, Lesotho, Malawi, Mozambique, Namibia, Rwanda, South Africa, South Sudan, Tanzania, Uganda, Zambia, and Zimbabwe,	Size: Habitat: Diet:	LC
Giant eland	Tragelaphus (Taurotragus) derbianus (Gray, 1847) Two subspecies: T. d. derbianus J. E. Gray, 1847 – western giant eland, found in western Africa, particularly Senegal to Mali. Its coat is rufous, and can have up to 15 stripes.; T. d. gigas Heuglin, 1863 – eastern giant eland, found in central to eastern Africa, particularly Cameroon to South Sudan. Its coat is sandy, and can have up to 12 stripes.	Cameroon, Central African Republic, Chad, Democratic Republic of the Congo, Guinea, Mali, Senegal, and South Sudan.	Size: Habitat: Diet:	VU

Although some authors, like Theodor Haltenorth, regarded the giant eland as conspecific with the common eland, they are generally considered two distinct species.

== Genetics and evolution ==
The eland have 31 male chromosomes and 32 female chromosomes. In a 2008 phylogenomic study of spiral-horned antelopes, chromosomal similarities were observed between cattle (Bos taurus) and eight species of spiral-horned antelopes, namely: nyala (Tragelaphus angasii), lesser kudu (T. imberbis), bongo (T. eurycerus), bushbuck (T. scriptus), greater kudu (T. strepsiceros), sitatunga (T. spekei), giant eland and common eland. It was found that chromosomes involved in centric fusions in these species used a complete set of cattle painting probes generated by laser microdissection. The study confirmed the presence of the chromosome translocation known as Robertsonian translocation (1;29), a widespread evolutionary marker common to all known tragelaphid species.

An accidental mating between a male giant eland and a female kudu produced a male offspring, but it was azoospermic. Analysis showed that it completely lacked germ cells, which produce gametes. Still, the hybrid had a strong male scent and exhibited male behaviour. Chromosomal examination showed that chromosomes 1, 3, 5, 9, and 11 differed from the parental karyotypes. Notable mixed inherited traits were pointed ears as the eland's, but a bit widened like kudu's. The tail was half the length of that of an eland, with a terminal tuft of hair as in kudu. Female elands can also act as surrogates for bongos.

The bovid ancestors of the eland evolved approximately 20 million years ago in Africa; fossils are found throughout Africa and France but the best record appears in sub-Saharan Africa. The first members of the tribe Tragelaphini appear 6 million years in the past during the late Miocene. An extinct ancestor of the common eland (Taurotragus arkelli) appears in the Pleistocene in northern Tanzania and the first T. oryx fossil appears in the Holocene in Algeria. Previous genetic studies of African savanna ungulates revealed the presence of a long-standing Pleistocene refugium in eastern and southern Africa, which also includes the giant eland. The common eland and giant eland have been estimated to have diverged about 1.6 million years ago.

== Differences between species ==
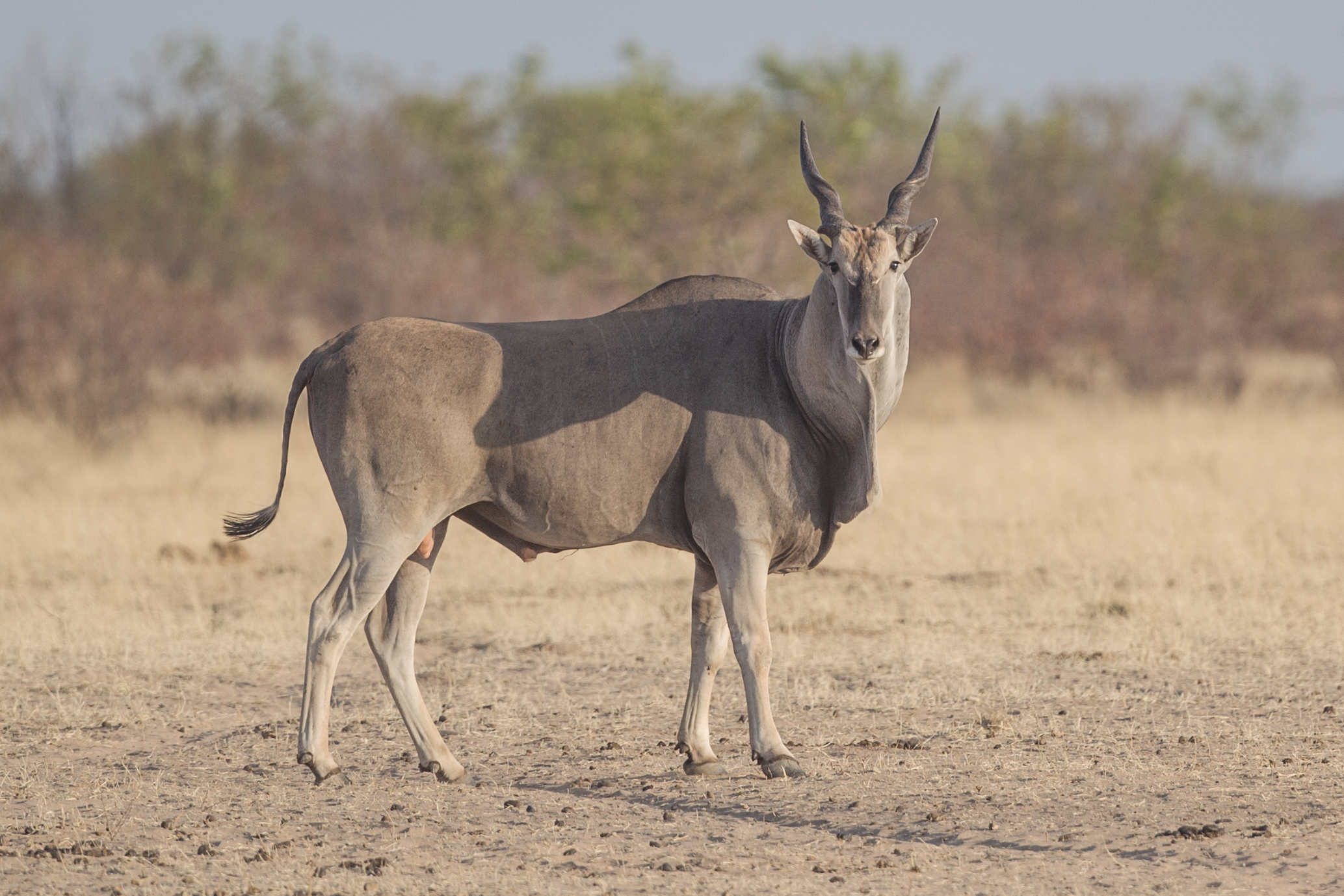
Common eland

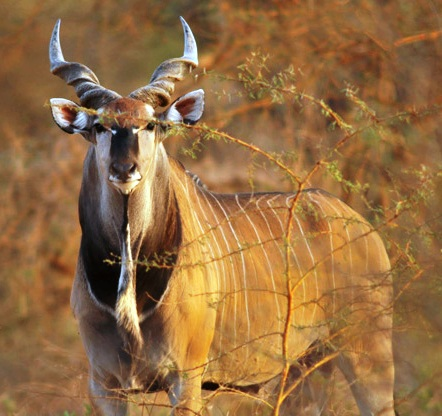
Giant eland

Both the species of eland are large spiral-horned antelopes. Though the giant eland broadly overlaps in size with the common eland, the former is somewhat larger on average than the latter. In fact, the giant eland is the largest species of antelope in the world. Eland are sexually dimorphic, as the females are smaller than males. The two eland species are nearly similar in height, ranging from 130–180 cm (51–71 in). In both species, males typically weigh 400 to 1,000 kg (880 to 2,200 lb) while females weigh 300 to 600 kg (660 to 1,320 lb).

The coat of the common eland is tan for females, and darker with a bluish tinge for males. The giant eland is reddish-brown to chestnut. The coat of the common eland varies geographically; the eland in southern Africa lack the distinctive markings (torso stripes, markings on legs, dark garters and a spinal crest) present in those from the northern half of the continent. Similarly, the giant eland displays 8 to 12 well-defined vertical white torso stripes. In both species the coat of the males darken with age. According to zoologist Jakob Bro-Jørgensen, the colour of the male's coat can reflect the levels of androgens (male sex hormones), which are highest during rutting.
