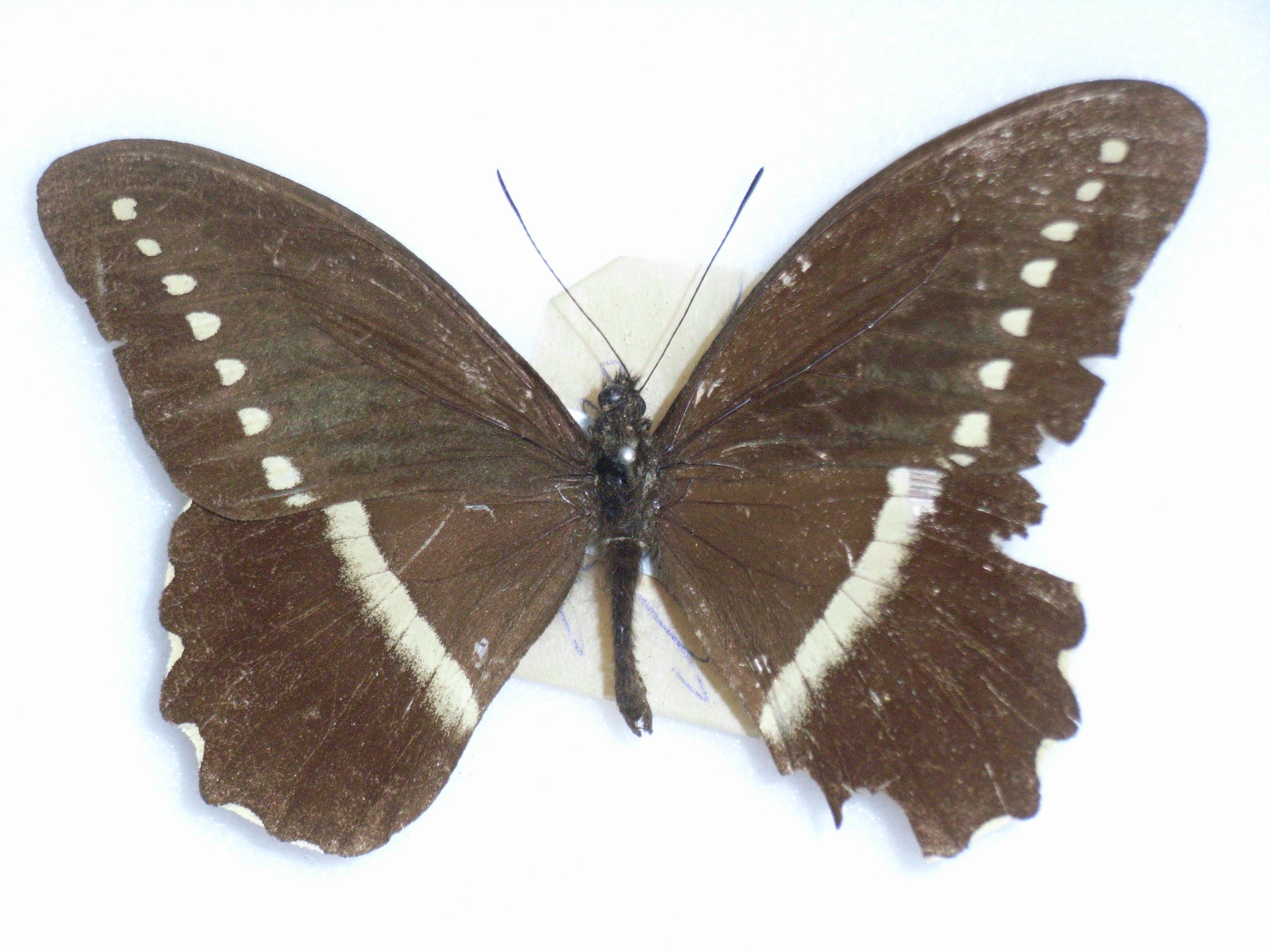

Conservation status
- Near Threatened (IUCN 2.3)

Scientific classification
- Kingdom: Animalia
- Phylum: Arthropoda
- Clade: Pancrustacea
- Class: Insecta
- Order: Lepidoptera
- Family: Papilionidae
- Genus: Papilio
- Species: P. sjoestedti

Binomial name
- Papilio sjoestedti Aurivillius, 1908

= Papilio sjoestedti =

Species of butterfly

Papilio sjoestedti, the Kilimanjaro swallowtail, is a species of butterfly in the family Papilionidae. It is endemic to Kilimanjaro Region of Tanzania.

== Description ==
In 1960, Robert Herbert Carcasson wrote: "Male very similar to above (fulleborni), but white band very narrow in both wings. Female similar to above (fulleborni), but ochreous discal area of hindwing much smaller. Both sexes may be distinguished from all other species of the group by the very much darker underside."

== Taxonomy ==
Papilio sjoestedti is a member of the echerioides species-group. This clade includes:

- Papilio echerioides Trimen, 1868
- Papilio fuelleborni Karsch, 1900
- Papilio jacksoni Sharpe, 1891
- Papilio sjoestedti Aurivillius, 1908

It is mostly treated as a subspecies of Papilio fuelleborni.

== Etymology ==
It was named for Swedish naturalist Bror Yngve Sjöstedt.
