= Kalimawe Game Controlled Area =

Protected area in Tanzania

Coordinates: 4.15°S 38.18°E

- IUCN category VI (protected area with sustainable use of natural resources)
- Established: 1974

The Kalimawe Game Controlled Area is found in Tanzania. It was established in 1974. This site is 300 km^{2}.
