= Kipo Forest Reserve =

Forest reserve of Tanzania

- Interactive map of Kipo Forest Reserve
- Location: Rufiji River Valley, Pwani, Tanzania
- Coordinates: 7°51′0″S 38°34′0″E
- Governing body: Ministry of Natural Resources and Tourism
- Operator: Forest and Beekeeping Division

The Kipo Forest Reserve is a forest reserve of Tanzania located in the Rufiji River Valley in Rufiji District, Pwani Region of eastern Tanzania, East Africa. It is protected under the 2002 Tanzania Forest Act and managed by the Forest and Beekeeping Division of the Ministry of Natural Resources and Tourism (MNRT) of Tanzania.

The estimate terrain elevation above sea level is 49 metres.
