= Endulen Game Controlled Area =

Protected area in Tanzania

Coordinates: 3.2197366°S 35.268268°E

- IUCN category VI (protected area with sustainable use of natural resources)

The Endulen Game Controlled Area is found in Tanzania. It was established in 1974. This site is 600 km^{2}.
