= Lake Ndutu =

Lake in Arusha Region, Tanzania

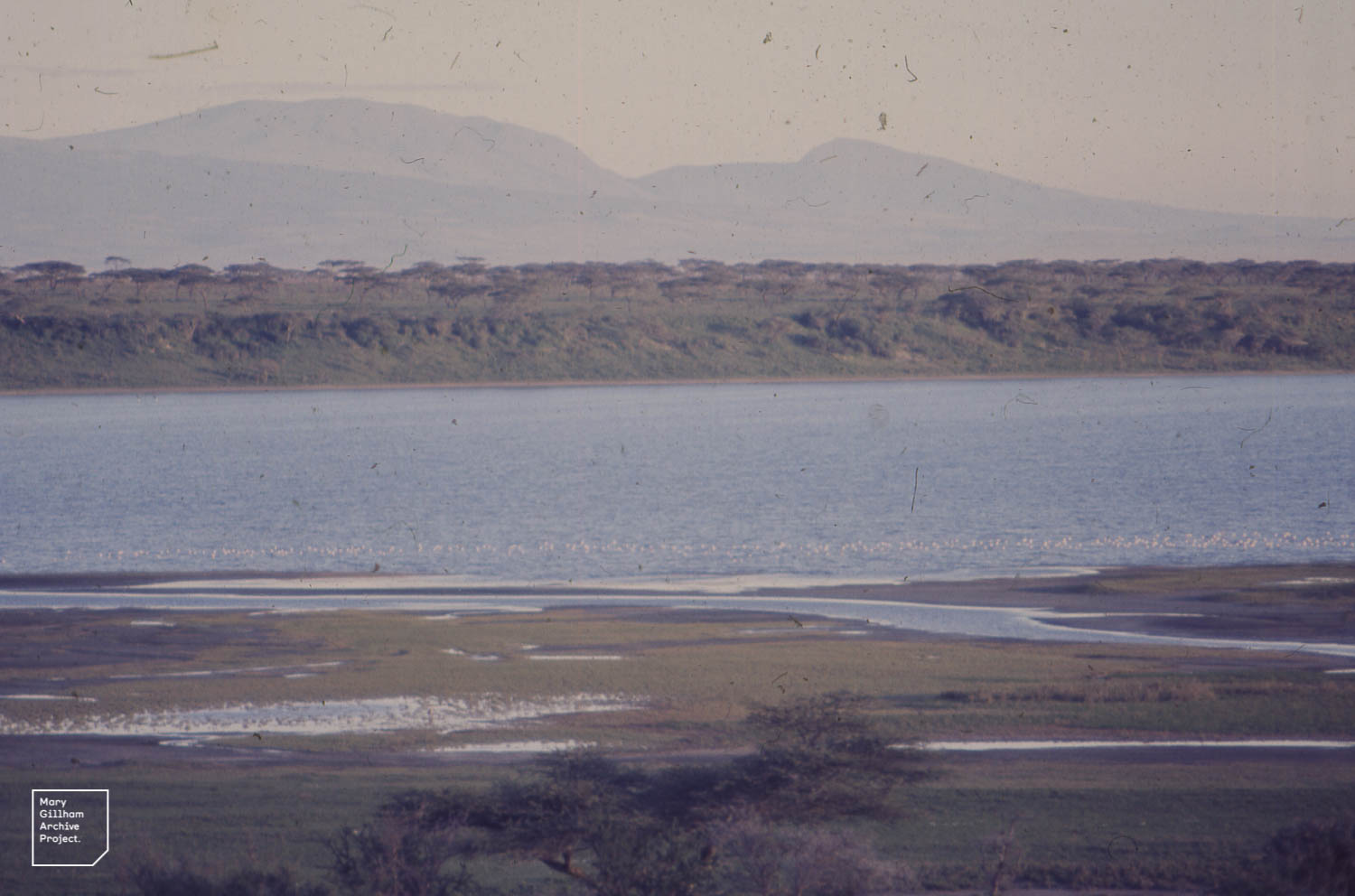
- Flamingoes on Lake Ndutu

- Location within Tanzania
- Location: Arusha Region, Tanzania
- Coordinates: 3.00°S 35.00°E
- Type: Soda lake
- Primary inflows: Various ephemeral streams
- Primary outflows: Oldupai River
- Basin countries: Tanzania

Lake Ndutu, also called Lake Lagarja, is a small, seasonal soda lake located in the southern Serengeti in northern Tanzania. It neighbours Lake Masek and lies near the Olduvai Gorge. It is surrounded by plains and woodlands. It is a major gathering site for migratory animals like wildebeest and zebras, serving as a seasonal calving ground.

Excavations at the lake in 1973 uncovered the Ndutu cranium, the incomplete skull of an early hominin.

== Description ==
Lake Ndutu is located in the southern Serengeti in northern Tanzania. It lies near the western end of the Main Gorge at Olduvai. It is immediately neighboured by Lake Masek to its southeast. Both are small soda lakes. Lake Ndutu is surrounded by shortgrass plains and the Ndutu woodlands.

Lake Ndutu is seasonal; its water level swings dramatically, and at times the lake fully dries. It recedes mostly southwards and eastwards during the dry season, baring broad mud flats. It lies near the head of the drainage system that feeds the Main Gorge at Olduvai and spills into the Olbalbal Depression. The head of the drainage system has small, shallow wetlands. During especially wet years, it is fed by ephemeral streams from the surrounding plains and one links it to Lake Masek. The two lakes feed the ephemeral Oldupai River.

== Ecology ==
The surrounding woodlands are composed of Acacia, Commiphora, and Balanites species.

Lakes Ndutu and Masek lie near major wildebeest migration routes within and around the Serengeti, and they are some of the most heavily occupied areas. The area around the lakes are calving grounds for wildebeest and zebras, who gather between January and March. Wildebeest migrate to plains south of Lake Ndutu from December to May. When the lake level is high, wildebeest must swim in order to cross, leading to mass drowning events. Thousands of wildebeest can die in these events, though drowning is a ultimately a minor cause of wildebeest mortality. The lakes also support spotted hyenas, cheetahs, leopards, and lions, who prey upon the migratory animals. Black-backed jackals inhabit the woodlands.

== Archaeological finds ==
The Ndutu cranium was discovered at Lake Ndutu by Tanzanian archaeologist Amini Aza Mturi from excavations during September to October 1973. The partial hominin skull – whose species identification is disputed – is estimated to be 500,000 to 600,000 years old. Lithic materials were also excavated with the skull, including 20 identified tools, mostly hammerstones.
