= Handeni Game Controlled Area =

Wildlife sanctuary in Handeni District, Tanga Region

Handeni Hill Forest Reserve
- Location within Tanzania
- Location: Handeni District, Tanga Region, Tanzania
- Nearest city: Handeni
- Coordinates: 5°36′40″S 38°05′33″E
- Area: 3,500 km^{2} (1,400 sq mi)
- Established: 1973

The Handeni National Forest Reserve (or Handeni Game Controlled Area) is a forest reserve located in Handeni District of Tanga Region in Tanzania. It was established in 1973. This site is 3,500 square kilometres (1,400 sq mi).
