= Mohammed VI Mosque (Dar es Salaam) =

Mosque in Dar es Salaam, Tanzania

- Msikiti wa Mfalme Mohamed wa Sita
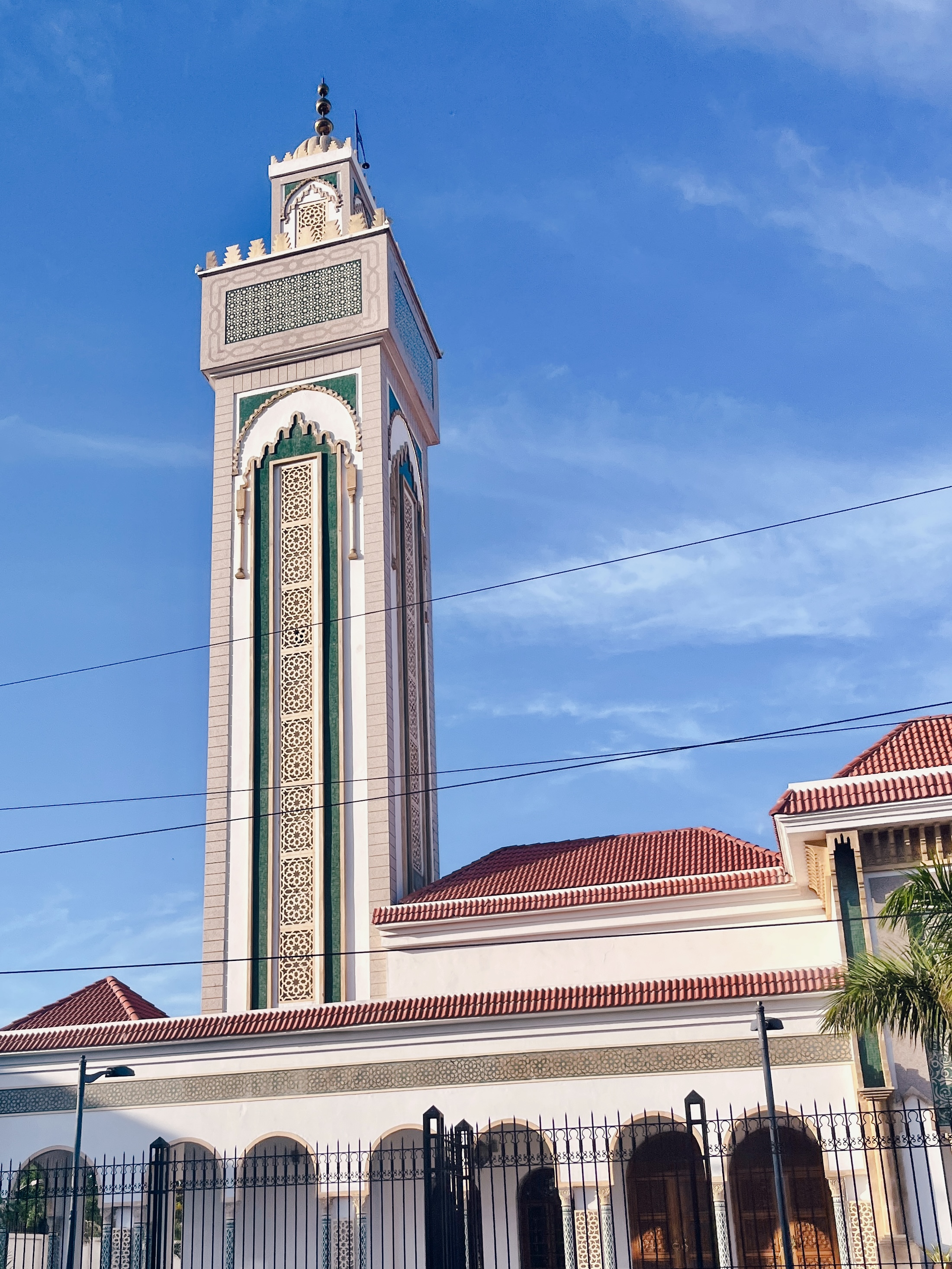
- Minaret of the mosque

- Location of the mosque in Tanzania

Religion
- Affiliation: Sunni Islam
- Ecclesiastical or organizational status: Friday mosque
- Governing body: BAKWATA
- Status: Active

Location
- Location: Dar es Salaam
- Country: Tanzania
- Interactive map of Mohammed VI Mosque
- Coordinates: 6°47′23″S 39°16′05″E

Architecture
- Type: Mosque
- Style: Moorish Revial
- Funded by: Mohammed VI of Morocco
- Groundbreaking: 25 October 2016
- Completed: 2022

Specifications
- Capacity: c. 5,000 – c. 8,000 worshipers
- Minaret: 1
- Site area: 7,400 m^{2} (80,000 sq ft)

The Mohammed VI Mosque (Swahili: Msikiti wa Mfalme Mohamed wa Sita) is a Friday mosque in Dar es Salaam, Tanzania. The mosque complex also serves as the headquarters of the National Muslim Council of Tanzania.

== Gallery ==
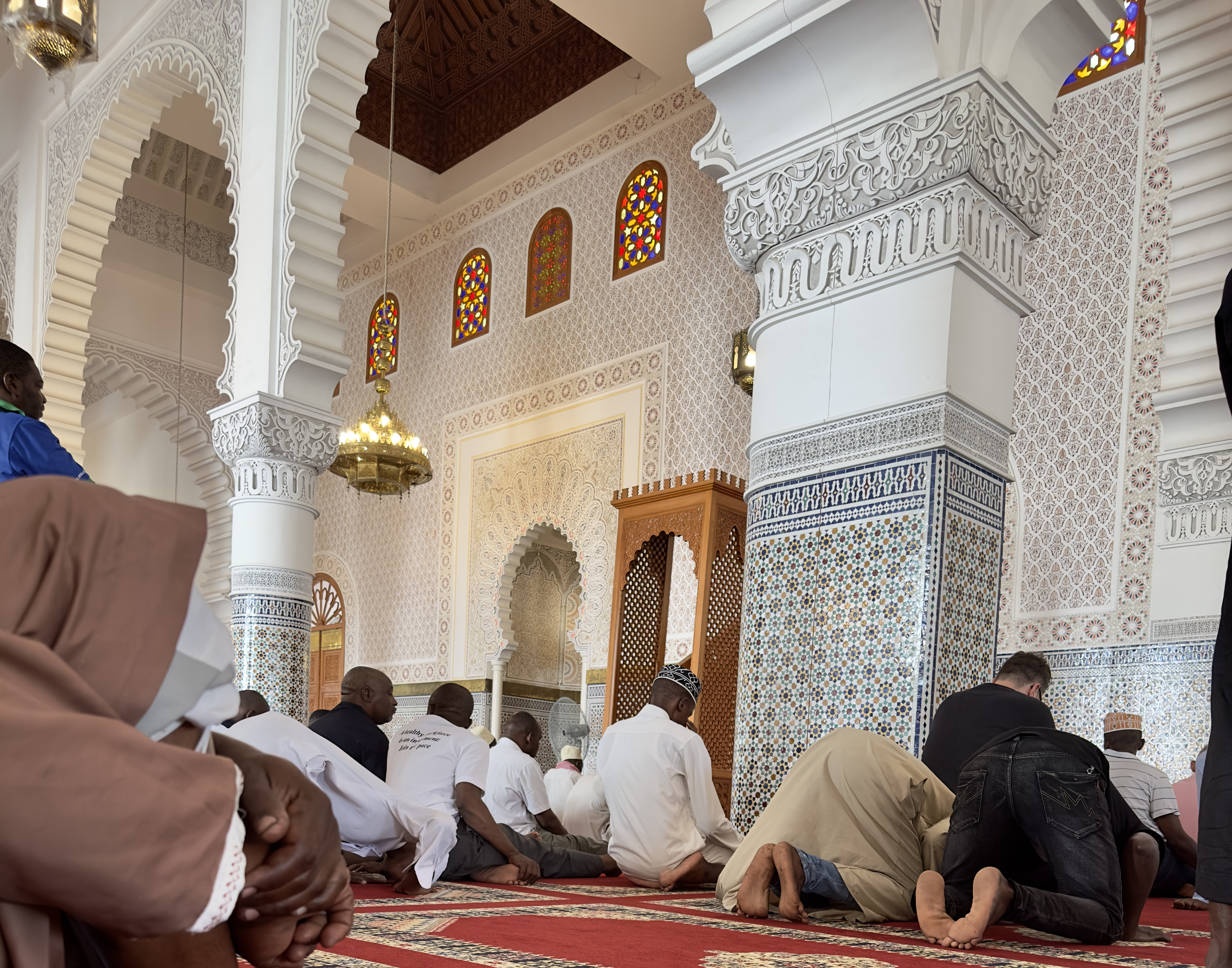
Interior

== See also ==
- Islam in Tanzania
- List of mosques in Tanzania
