= Dar es Salaam =

Largest city in Tanzania

- Largest city of Tanzania
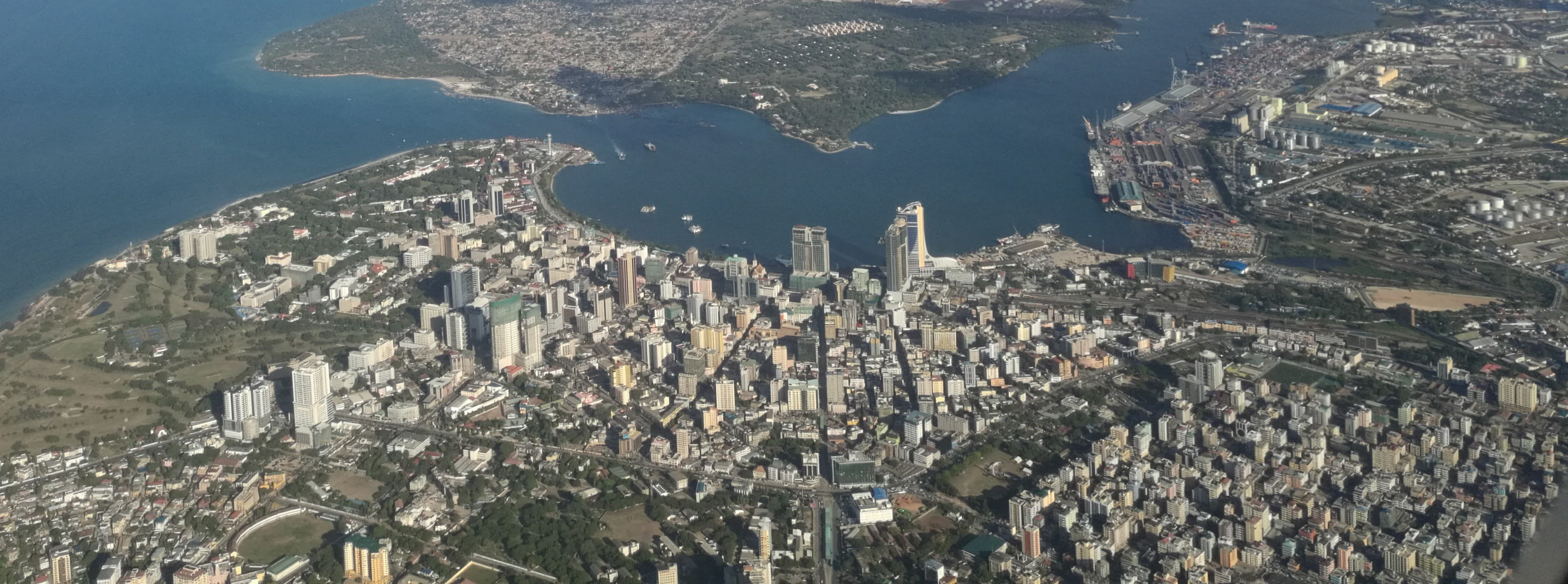
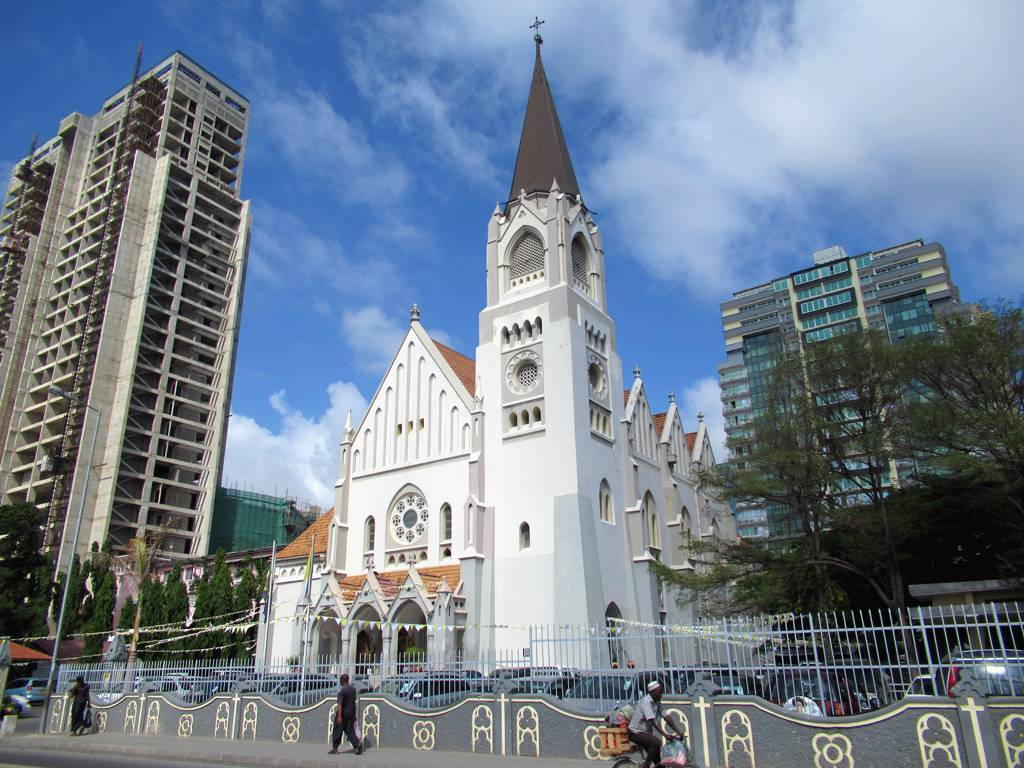
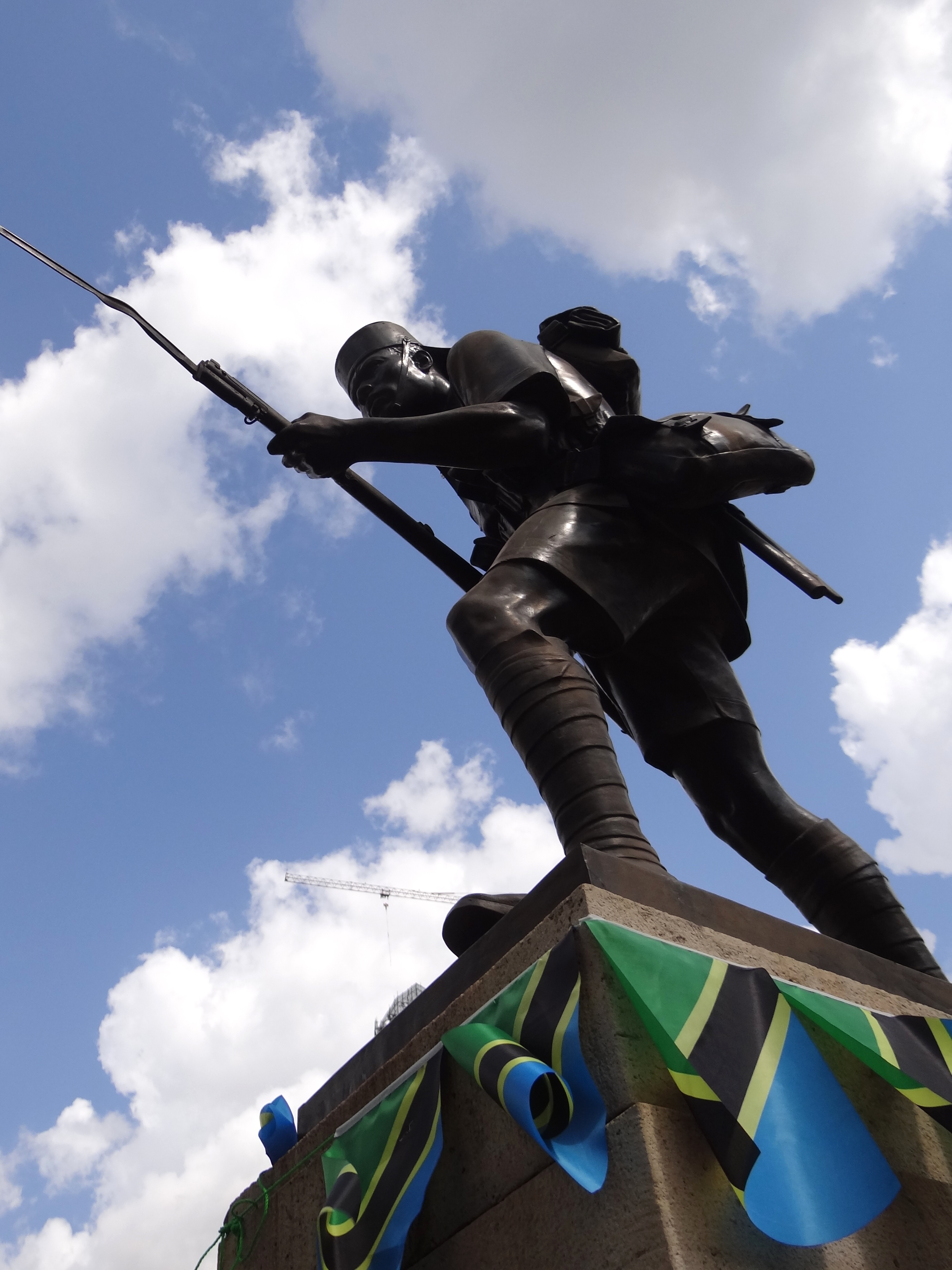
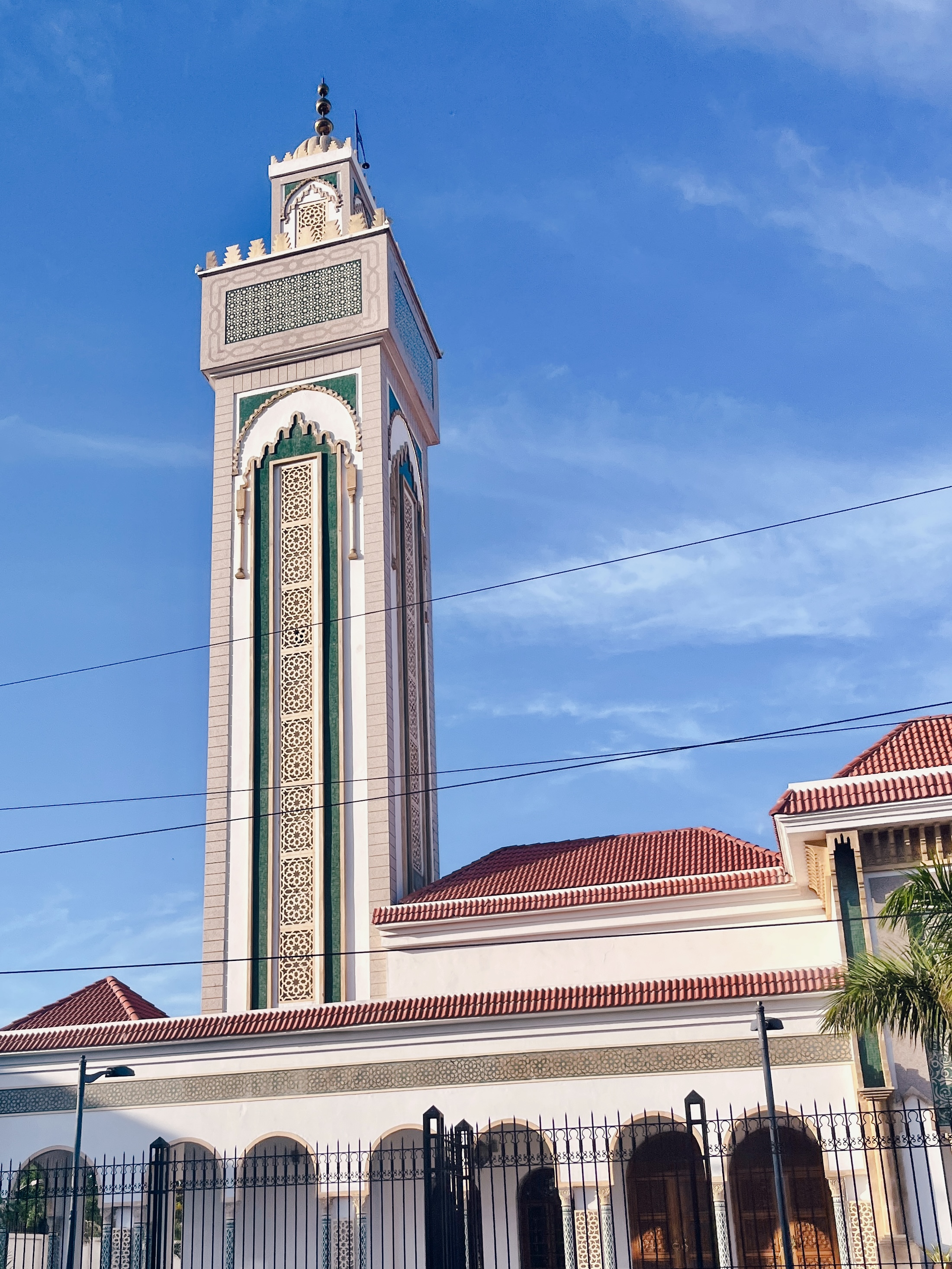
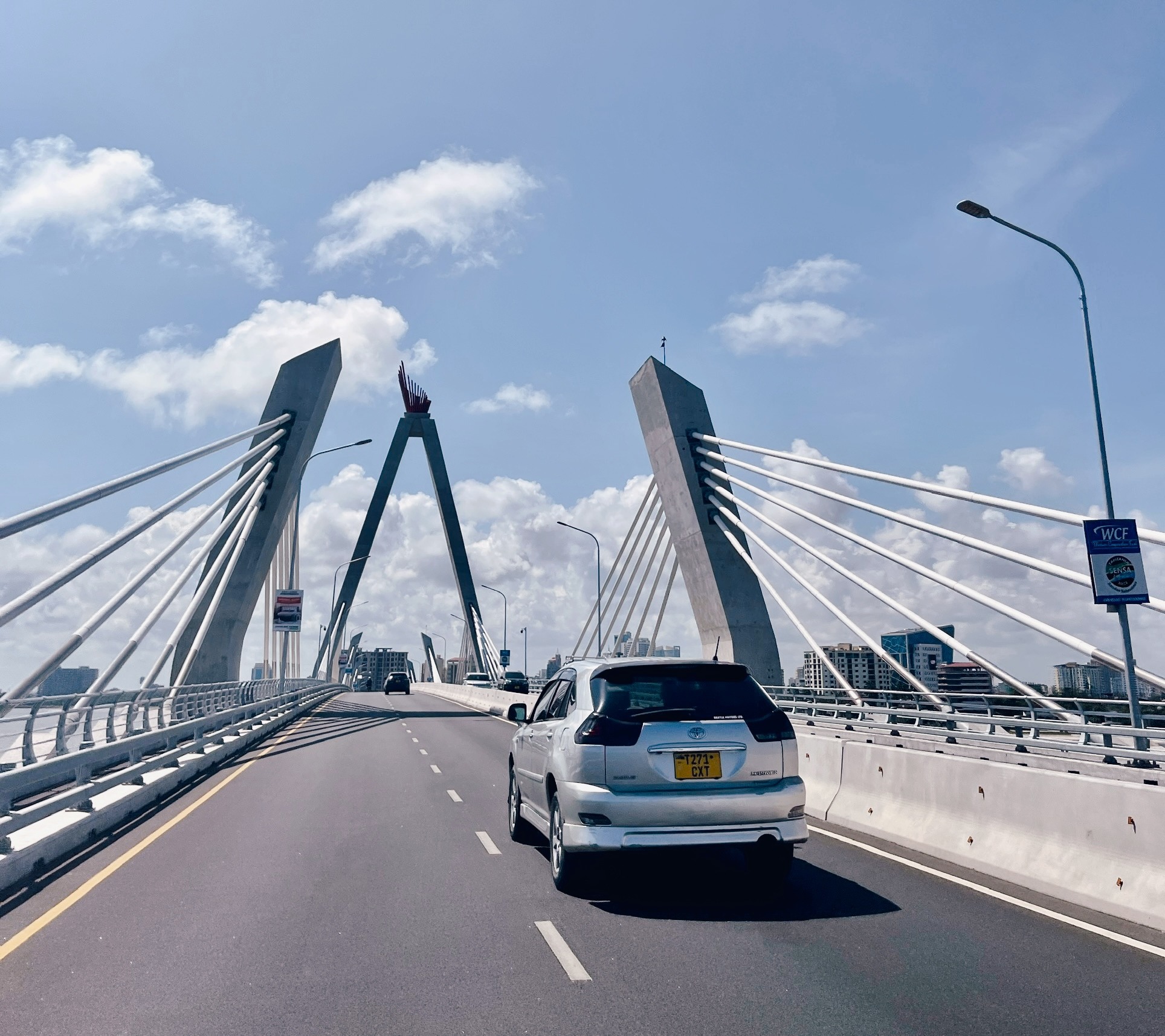
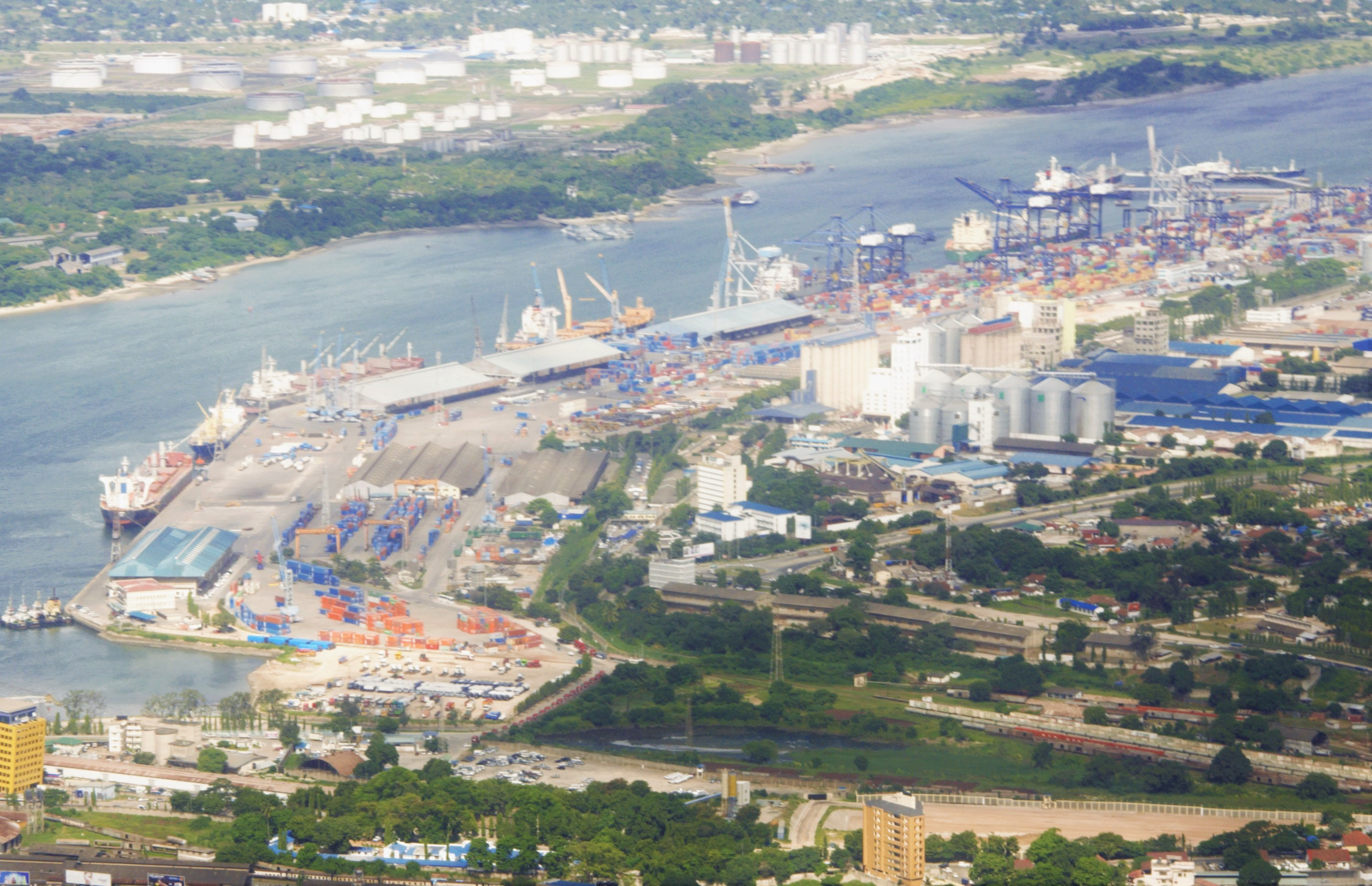
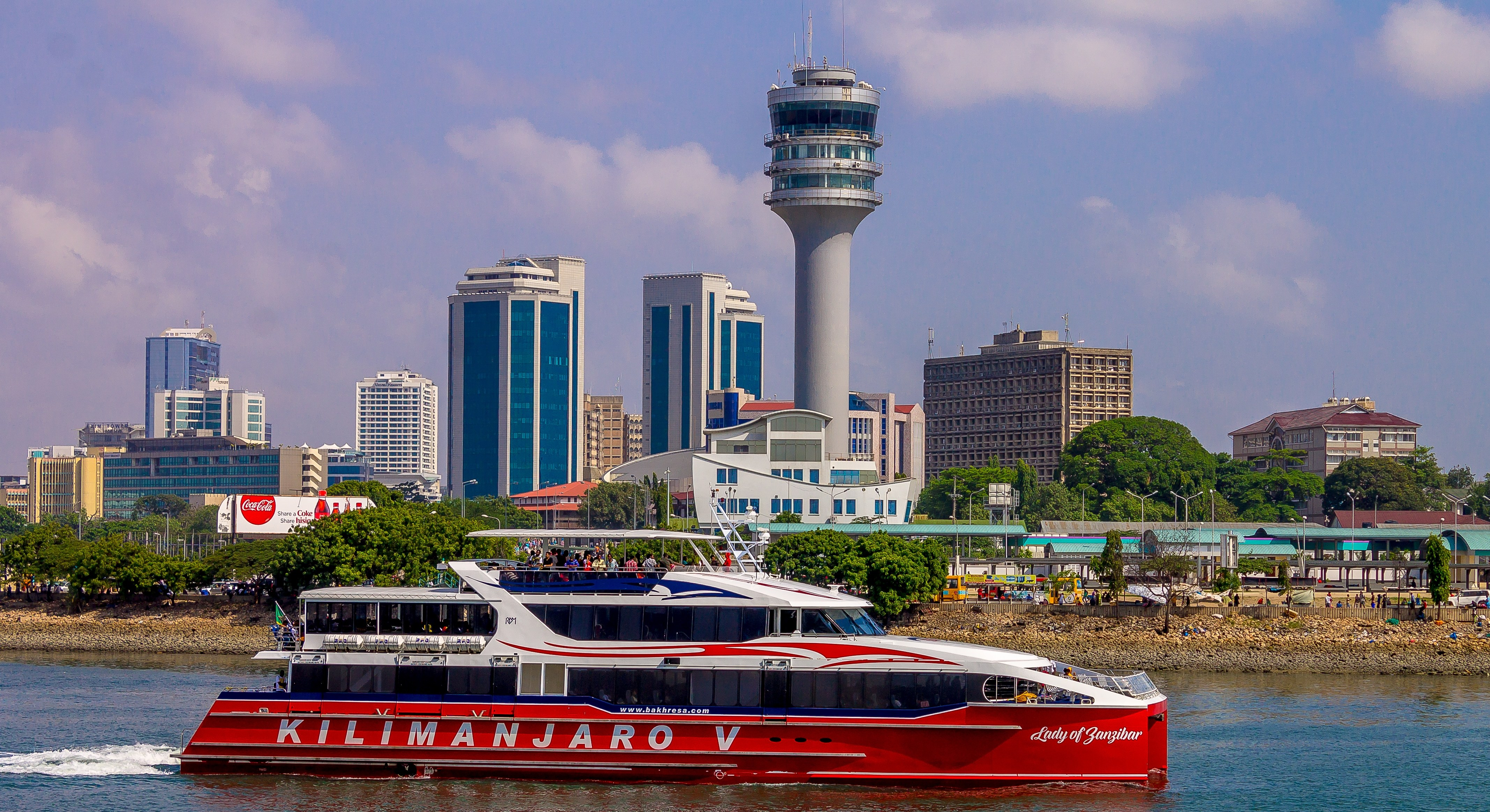
- Aerial view of Dar es Salaam St. Joseph's Cathedral Askari Monument Mohammed VI Mosque Benjamin Mkapa Stadium Tanzanite Bridge Port of Dar es Salaam Skyline from MV Kigamboni

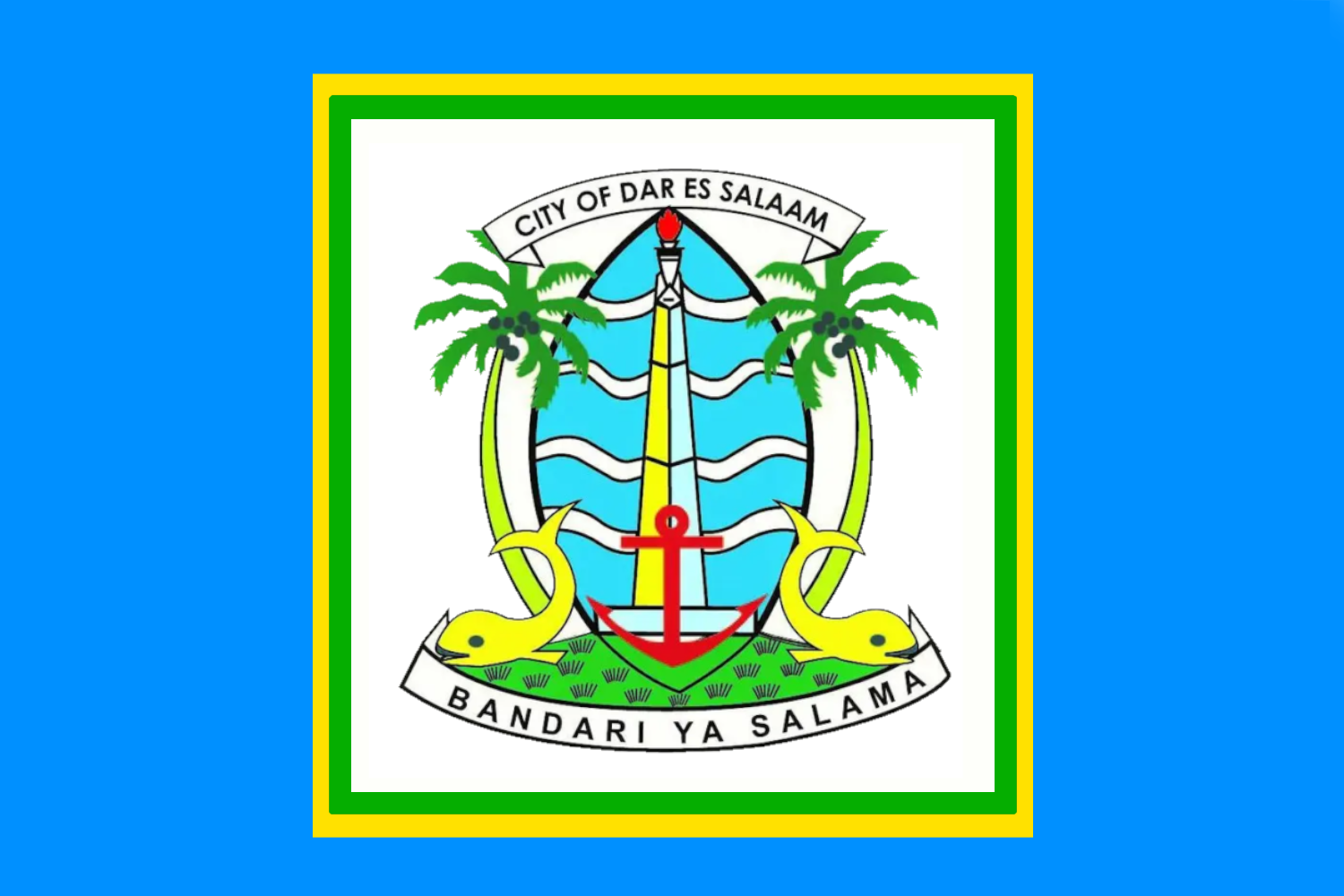
- Flag Seal
- Interactive map of Dar es Salaam
- Location of Dar es Salaam
- Coordinates: 06°48′58″S 39°16′49″E
- Country: Tanzania
- Region: Dar es Salaam
- Founded: 1862; 164 years ago
- Districts: List: Ilala; Kigamboni; Kinondoni; Ubungo; Temeke

Government
  - Regional Commissioner: Albert Challamila
  - Lord Mayor: Nurdin Bilal Juma (Shetta)

Area
  - Total: 1,599 km^{2} (617 sq mi)
  - Water: 0 km^{2} (0 sq mi)

Population (2023 estimate)
  - Total: 7,776,000
  - Rank: 5th in Africa; 1st in Tanzania
  - Density: 4,863/km^{2} (12,600/sq mi)
- Time zone: UTC+3 (EAT)
- Postcode: 11xxx
- Area code: 022
- HDI (2018): 0.699 medium · 2nd
- Website: dcc.go.tz

Dar es Salaam (English: /ˌdɑːr.ɛs.səˈlɑːm/, Swahili: [ɗɑr‿ɛs‿sɑˈlɑːm]; from Arabic: دَار السَّلَام, romanised: Dār as-Salām, lit. 'Abode of Peace') is the largest city and financial hub of Tanzania and capital of the Dar es Salaam Region. It is located on the Swahili coast. With a population of over 7 million people, Dar es Salaam is the largest city in East Africa by population and the fifth-largest in Africa. Dar es Salaam remains an important economic centre and one of the fastest-growing cities in the world. Experts predict that the city's population will grow to over 10 million before 2030.

The city was founded in the mid-19th century and served as the main administrative and commercial centre of German East Africa, Tanganyika and Tanzania. The decision was made in 1974 to move the capital to Dodoma which was officially completed in 1996.

Dar es Salaam is Tanzania's most prominent city for arts, fashion, media, film, television and finance. It is the capital of the co-extensive Dar es Salaam Region, one of Tanzania's 31 administrative regions and consists of five districts: Kinondoni in the north; Ilala in the centre; Ubungo and Temeke in the south; and Kigamboni in the east across the Kurasini estuary.

== History ==
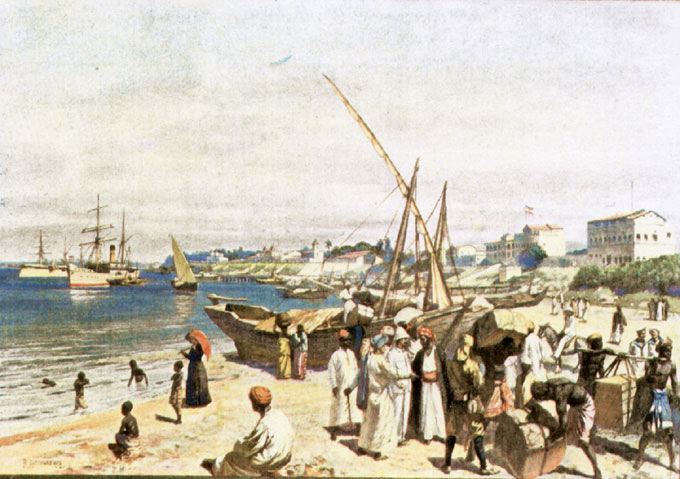
Image of the port of Dar es Salaam from the book Von Unseren Kolonien by Ottomar Beta in the year 1908

In the 19th century, 'Mzizima (Swahili for "healthy town") was a coastal fishing village on the periphery of Indian Ocean trade routes. In 1865 or 1866, Sultan Majid bin Said of Zanzibar began building a new city very close to Mzizima and named it Dar es Salaam. The name is commonly translated from Arabic as "abode (home) of peace", from dar ("house"), and es salaam ("of peace"). Dar es Salaam fell into decline after Majid's death in 1870, but was revived in 1887 when the German East Africa Company established a station there. The town's growth was facilitated by its role as the administrative and commercial centre of German East Africa and industrial expansion following the construction of the Central Railway Line in the early 1900s.

In the East African campaign of World War I, British and Empire forces captured German East Africa. The Royal Navy bombarded the city with the monitor Mersey on 21 July 1916 and battleship HMS Vengeance on 21 August. The German colonial authorities surrendered the city on 3 September. German East Africa became the British Tanganyika Territory.

Dar es Salaam remained the administrative and commercial centre. Under British indirect rule, European areas such as Oyster Bay and African areas (e.g., Kariakoo and Ilala) developed separately from the city centre. The city's population also included a large number of workers from British India, many of whom came to take advantage of trade and commercial opportunities. After World War II, Dar es Salaam experienced a period of rapid growth.

Political developments, including the formation and growth of the Tanganyika African National Union, led to Tanganyika's independence from colonial rule in December 1961. Dar es Salaam continued to serve as its capital, even when Tanganyika and the People's Republic of Zanzibar merged to form Tanzania in 1964. In 1973, provisions were made to relocate the capital to Dodoma, a more centrally located city in the interior. The relocation process to Dodoma was completed, although Dar es Salaam continued to be the location of most government offices.

In 1967, the Tanzanian government declared the ujamaa policy, which made Tanzania lean towards socialism. The move hampered the potential growth of the city as the government encouraged people not to move into cities and instead remain in Ujamaa socialist villages. By the 1980s, the policy failed to combat the increasing poverty and hunger that Tanzania faced, and had delayed necessary development. This situation led to the liberalisation policy of the 1980s that essentially ended socialism and silenced its proponents within Tanzania's government through political repression.

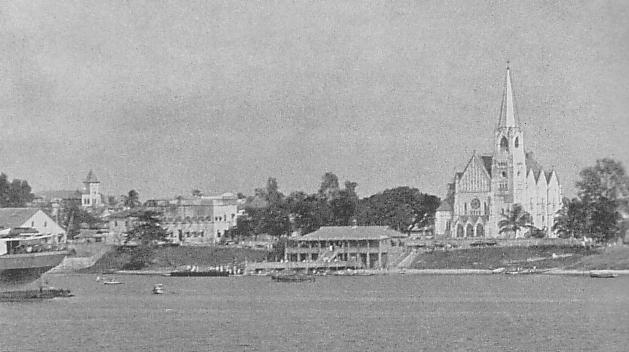
Dar es Salaam in the 1930s, with the Old Boma and St. Joseph's Cathedral prominently in view

Until the late 1990s, Dar es Salaam was not regarded in the same echelon as Africa's leading cities like Cairo, Nairobi, Johannesburg, Lagos, or Addis Ababa. During the 2000s, businesses opened and prospered; growth expanded in the construction sector, with new multi-storey buildings, bridges and roads; Tanzanian banks headquartered in the city became better regulated; and the Dar es Salaam Stock Exchange expanded. The port is prominent for entrepot trade with landlocked countries like Rwanda, Burundi, Zambia, and the eastern portion of the Democratic Republic of the Congo. The city's skyline features tall buildings, among them the 35-storey PSPF Tower (finished in 2015) and the Tanzania Ports Authority (TPA) Tower, the tallest in the country (completed in 2016).

A number of historical buildings and elements of urban planning, such as parts of the harbour and streets going back to colonial times, still exist. The Old Boma, one of the city's oldest buildings, was built in 1866–67 by Majid bin Said, sultan of Zanzibar, and enlarged under German rule. The Botanical Gardens now are close to the National Museum of Tanzania. The present-day State House goes back to Majid bin Said, and were the seat of the German and later the British colonial governments. Along with the Azania Front Lutheran Church, built between 1899 and 1902, and the Roman Catholic St. Joseph's Cathedral, constructed around the same period, Ocean Road Hospital are early historical buildings in Dar es Salaam.

== Geography ==
Dar es Salaam is located at 6°48' S, 39°17' E (−6.8000, 39.2833), on a natural harbour on the coast of East Africa, with sandy beaches in some areas.

=== Districts of Dar es Salaam region ===
PPF tower under construction.

Dar es Salaam Region is divided into five administrative districts, four of which are governed by municipal councils (Note: Apart from Ilala District, which has been governed by a city council since 2021 after the dissolution of the Dar es Salaam City Council.) that are affiliated with the city's suburbs or wards.

Districts of Dar es Salaam Region
District	Population (2016)	Area (km^{2})
Ilala District	1,528,489	210
Kigamboni District	1,510,129	N/A
Kinondoni District	1,164,177	527
Temeke District	204,029	150.4
Ubungo District	1,058,597	N/A
Dar es Salaam Region	5,465,420	1,393

==== Kinondoni ====
Kinondoni is the most populated of the districts. It houses half of the city's population and several high-income suburbs.

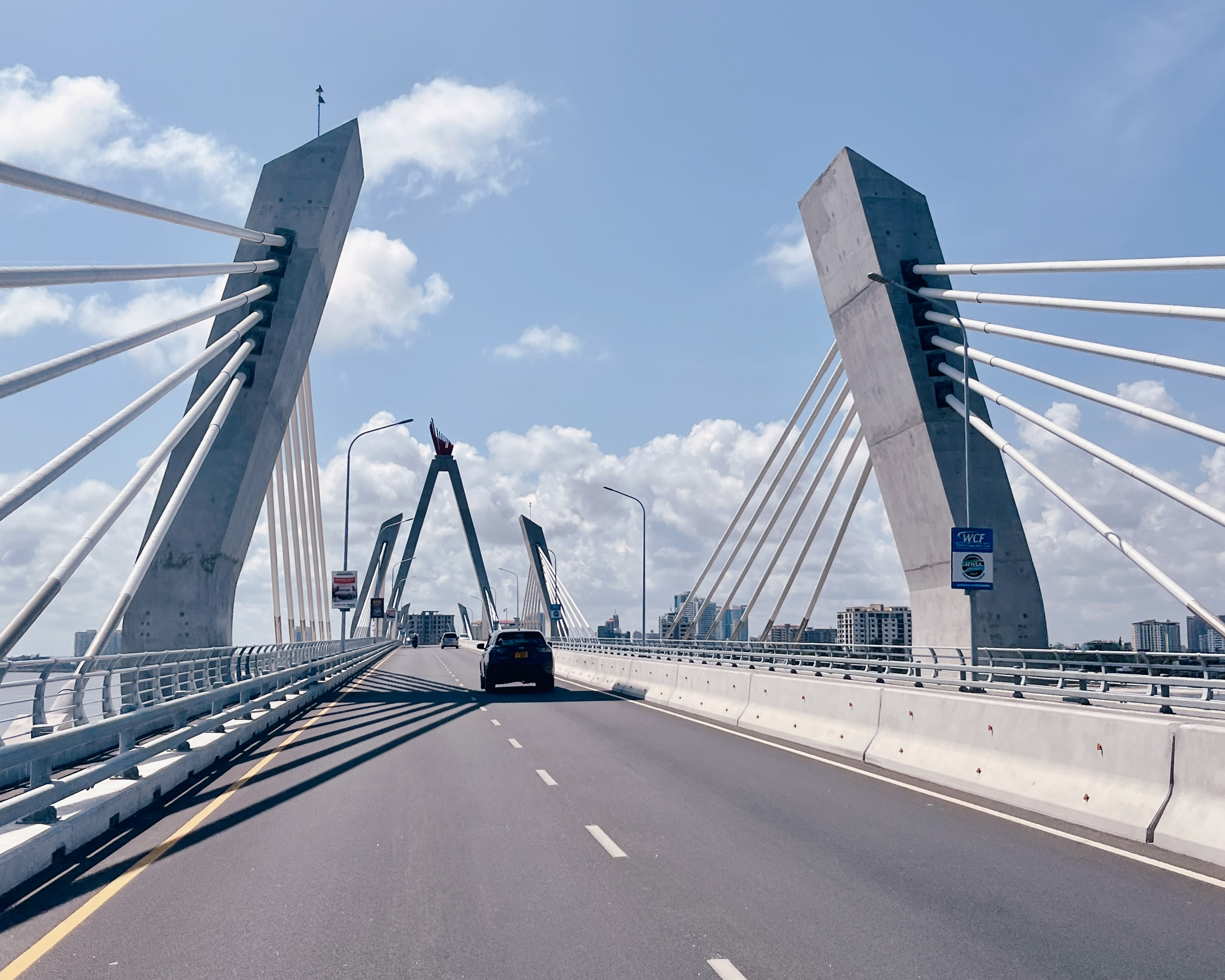
Tanzanite Bridge

- Masaki, Oyster Bay and Ada Estate are the high-income suburbs located along the central beach. During the Colonial Era, they were the major European suburbs of the city. Diplomats and expatriates currently reside in these areas. Oyster Bay Beach (also known as Coco Beach) is the only white sandy beach east of Kinondoni.
- Mikocheni and Regent Estate are also suburbs within the district. These are high and middle-income areas with Mikocheni B enjoying a higher population density than Mikocheni A and Regent Estate. According to the 2012 census, the Mikocheni ward had a population of 32,947.

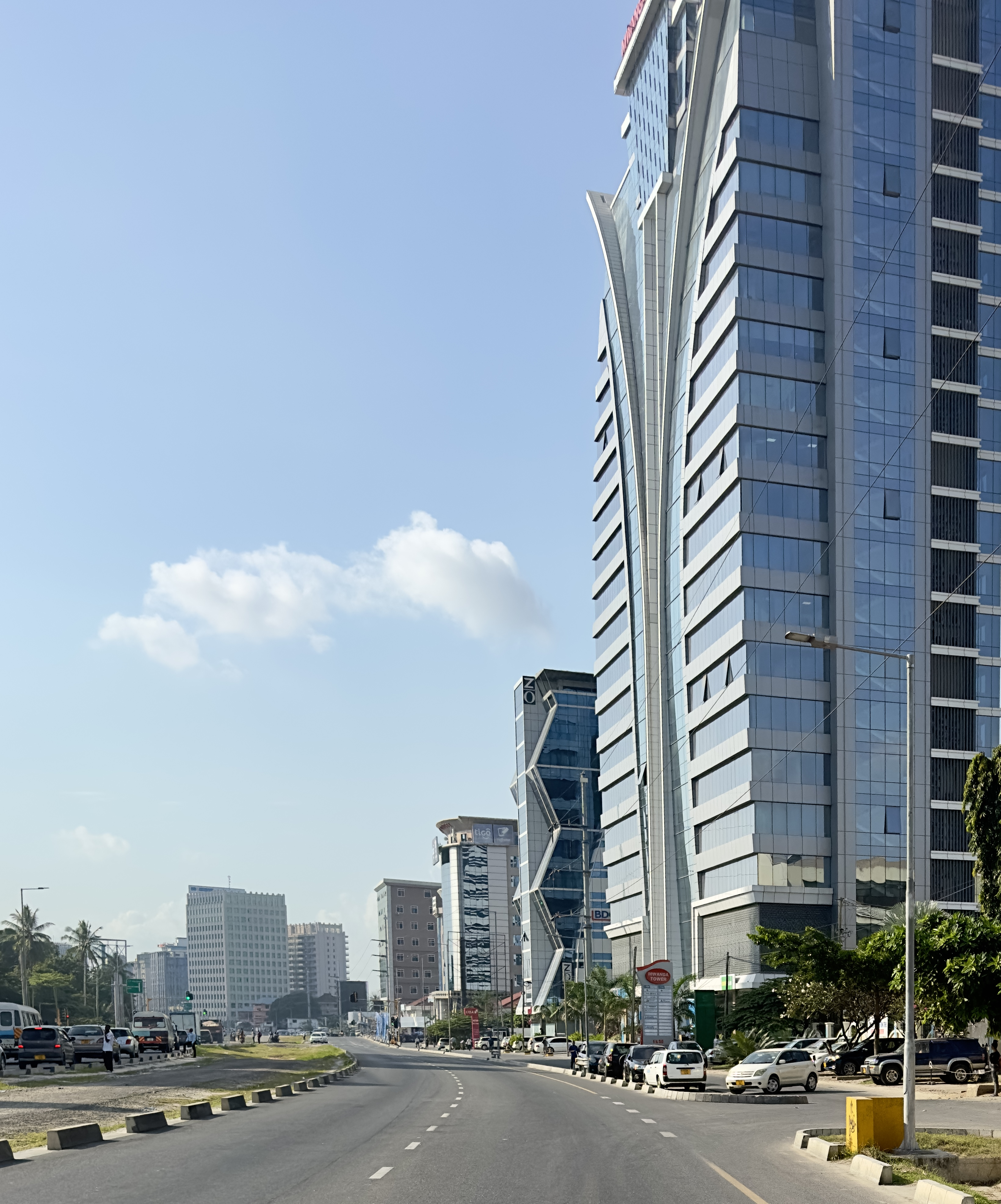
Bagamoyo rd, Mwnanyamala, Kinondoni District, Dar es Salaam

- Msasani is a peninsula to the northeast of the city centre and home to expatriates from the United Kingdom and other western countries. It contains a mixture of traditional shops and western-oriented resorts and stores including the redevelopment of the former Msani Slipway shipyard by architect Antoni Folkers.
- Mbezi Beach is the beachfront suburb located along the northern Dar es Salaam Beach. It contains several tourist hotels, residences and a kite-surfing area by Upepo Avenue.
- Sinza, Kijitonyama, Magomeni, Kinondoni and Mwenge are more ethnically mixed than the areas above and are located west of Dar es Salaam's Central Business District.

==== Ilala ====
The administrative district of Ilala contains almost all government offices, ministries, and the Central Business District. It is the transportation hub of the city, as the Julius Nyerere International Airport, Central Railway Station and Tazara Railway Station are all within the district's boundaries. The residential areas are mainly middle- to high-income, among them:

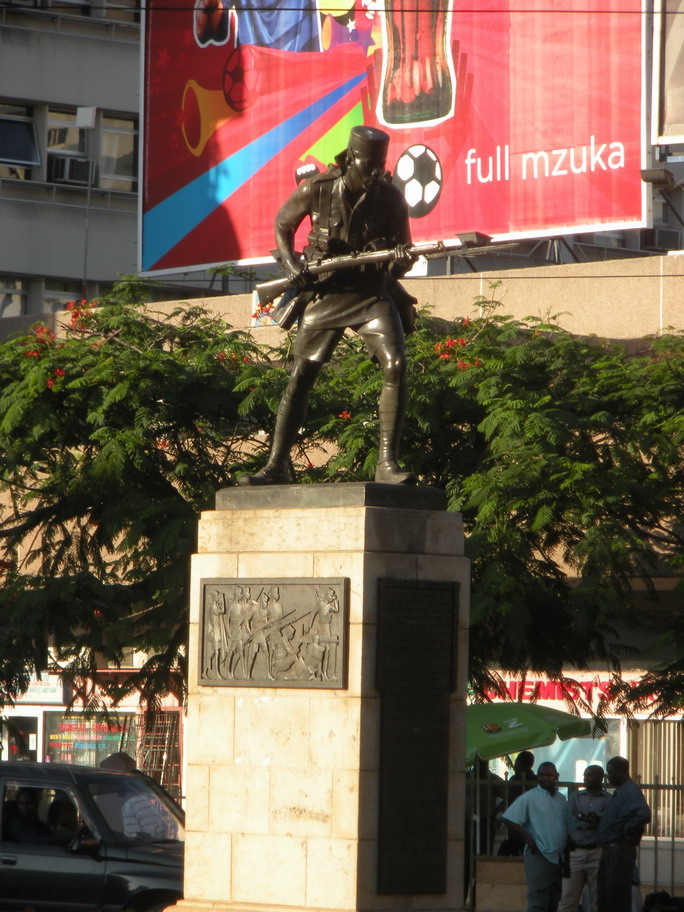
The Askari Monument along Samora Avenue marks the exact centre of Dar es Salaam, in the Ilala district.

- Upanga and Kisutu have the highest concentration of Asian communities within Dar es Salaam, with residents of Indian and Arabic descent. These areas contain colonial houses and mansions built in Indian, Arabic and European styles. Upanga is divided into Upanga East and Upanga West.
- Kariakoo is the shopping district of the city: shops, bazaars, and merchants sell products from foodstuffs to hardware. The Kariakoo Market contains the only underground section of the city. It is the major supply point of the food consumed by all Dar es Salaam residents.
- Tabata, Segerea and Ukonga are located slightly farther west from the city centre.
- Ilala, among the middle-income suburbs very near to the city centre, is marked by the Askari Monument and suffers from gang activity.

==== Temeke ====
Temeke is the main industrial district of the city, where manufacturing (both heavy and light industry) is located. To the east is the Port of Dar es Salaam, the largest port in the country. Temeke is believed to have the largest concentration of low-income residents due to industry. It is home to military and police officers as well as port officials.

- Kurasini, located on the harbour, contains Dar es Salaam Port, the Police College, the Mgulani Police Barracks and the Dar es Salaam International Trade Fair grounds. The main residents are police officers and port officials.

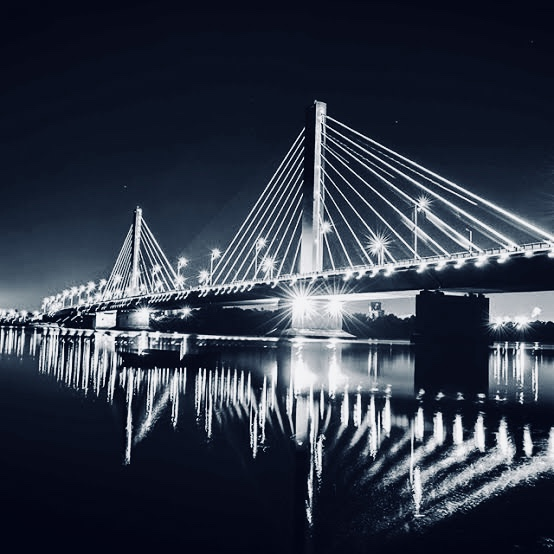
Kigamboni Bridge at night

- Chang'ombe is one of the few higher-income areas in Temeke. It has maintained this status due to the presence of African high colonial officers and some industry owners from the Colonial Era. Chang'ombe houses the Dar es Salaam University College of Education, the National Stadium and Uhuru Stadium.
- Temeke, Mtoni, Tandika, Kijichi, and Mbagala are middle to low-income suburbs, of which the last is the largest suburb in the entire district.

==== Ubungo ====
The Ubungo terminal serves as a transportation link to most large Dar es Salaam urban nodes. The narrow-gauge commuter rail runs from there to the city centre, with ten level crossings along the route.

This district is characterised with a lot of potential social and economic centres such as industries i.e. Urafiki textile industry, bus station and various institutes and universities such as National Institute of Transport (NIT).

==== Kigamboni ====
Kigamboni (also known as South Beach), a beachfront suburb on a peninsula, is home to an economically diverse population. Access to the suburb is mainly by ferry, although the Kigamboni Bridge provides an alternative.

=== Climate ===
Dar es Salaam experiences tropical climatic conditions, typified by hot and humid weather throughout much of the year due to its proximity to the equator and the warm Indian Ocean. It has a tropical savanna climate (Köppen: Aw/As). Annual rainfall is approximately 1,150 millimetres or 45 inches, and in a normal year there are two rainy seasons: the "long rains" in April and May, and the "short rains" in November and December.

Climate data for Dar es Salaam (Julius Nyerere International Airport) 1991–2020
Month	Jan	Feb	Mar	Apr	May	Jun	Jul	Aug	Sep	Oct	Nov	Dec	Year
Record high °C (°F)	35.8 (96.4)	35.2 (95.4)	36.9 (98.4)	35.5 (95.9)	32.9 (91.2)	33.0 (91.4)	31.8 (89.2)	31.9 (89.4)	34.0 (93.2)	33.7 (92.7)	34.0 (93.2)	34.5 (94.1)	36.9 (98.4)
Mean daily maximum °C (°F)	32.4 (90.3)	32.8 (91.0)	32.4 (90.3)	31.1 (88.0)	30.3 (86.5)	30.0 (86.0)	29.7 (85.5)	30.1 (86.2)	30.8 (87.4)	31.5 (88.7)	31.7 (89.1)	32.1 (89.8)	31.2 (88.2)
Daily mean °C (°F)	28.2 (82.8)	28.2 (82.8)	27.7 (81.9)	26.7 (80.1)	26.0 (78.8)	24.6 (76.3)	23.8 (74.8)	24.1 (75.4)	24.9 (76.8)	26.1 (79.0)	26.9 (80.4)	27.9 (82.2)	26.3 (79.3)
Mean daily minimum °C (°F)	24.9 (76.8)	24.5 (76.1)	24.0 (75.2)	23.2 (73.8)	22.0 (71.6)	20.3 (68.5)	19.3 (66.7)	19.1 (66.4)	19.5 (67.1)	20.8 (69.4)	22.6 (72.7)	24.2 (75.6)	22.0 (71.6)
Record low °C (°F)	18.1 (64.6)	18.4 (65.1)	19.6 (67.3)	19.6 (67.3)	15.9 (60.6)	14.4 (57.9)	13.7 (56.7)	12.8 (55.0)	14.2 (57.6)	15.0 (59.0)	17.6 (63.7)	18.8 (65.8)	12.8 (55.0)
Average rainfall mm (inches)	54.2 (2.13)	70.8 (2.79)	169.6 (6.68)	263.6 (10.38)	172.2 (6.78)	31.3 (1.23)	15.8 (0.62)	17.8 (0.70)	20.2 (0.80)	77.3 (3.04)	114.4 (4.50)	110.2 (4.34)	1,117.4 (43.99)
Average rainy days (≥ 1.0 mm)	4.2	4.2	11.3	16.6	11.3	3.9	3.0	3.1	3.6	5.4	8.5	7.5	82.6
Average relative humidity (%)	77	76	80	84	81	78	77	76	75	76	78	78	79
Mean monthly sunshine hours	235.6	223.2	213.9	156.0	213.9	222.0	223.2	266.6	252.0	275.9	252.0	241.8	2,776.1
Mean daily sunshine hours	7.6	7.9	6.9	5.2	6.9	7.4	7.2	8.6	8.4	8.9	8.4	7.8	7.6
Source 1: NOAA; all-time extreme temperature
Source 2: Deutscher Wetterdienst (extremes, humidity, and sun), Tokyo Climate Center (mean temperatures 1991–2020)

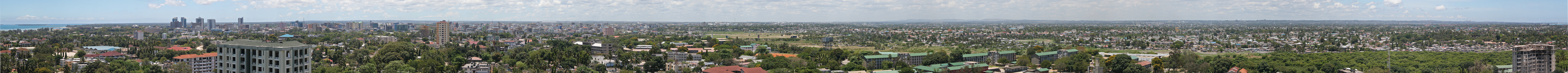
View of Dar es Salaam's daytime skyline, showing the city centre (Posta) and beyond

==== Climate change ====
A 2019 paper published in PLOS One estimated that under Representative Concentration Pathway 4.5, a "moderate" scenario of climate change where global warming reaches ~2.5–3 °C (4.5–5.4 °F) by 2100, the climate of Dar es Salaam in the year 2050 would most closely resemble the current climate of Barquisimeto in Venezuela. The annual temperature and temperatures of the warmest month would increase by 1.3 °C (2.3 °F), while the temperature of the coldest month would go down by 0.1 °C (0.18 °F). According to Climate Action Tracker, the current warming trajectory appears consistent with 2.7 °C (4.9 °F), which closely matches RCP 4.5.

Moreover, according to the 2022 IPCC Sixth Assessment Report, Dar es Salaam is one of 12 major African cities (Abidjan, Alexandria, Algiers, Cape Town, Casablanca, Dakar, Dar es Salaam, Durban, Lagos, Lomé, Luanda and Maputo) which would be the most severely affected by the future sea level rise. It estimates that they would collectively sustain cumulative damages of US$65 billion under RCP 4.5 and US$86.5 billion for the high-emission scenario RCP 8.5 by the year 2050. Additionally, RCP 8.5 combined with the hypothetical impact from marine ice sheet instability at high levels of warming would involve up to US$137.5 billion in damages, while the additional accounting for the "low-probability, high-damage events" may increase aggregate risks to US$187 billion for the "moderate" RCP4.5, US$206 billion for RCP8.5 and US$397 billion under the high-end ice sheet instability scenario. Since sea level rise would continue for about 10,000 years under every scenario of climate change, future costs of sea level rise would only increase, especially without adaptation measures.

== Government ==
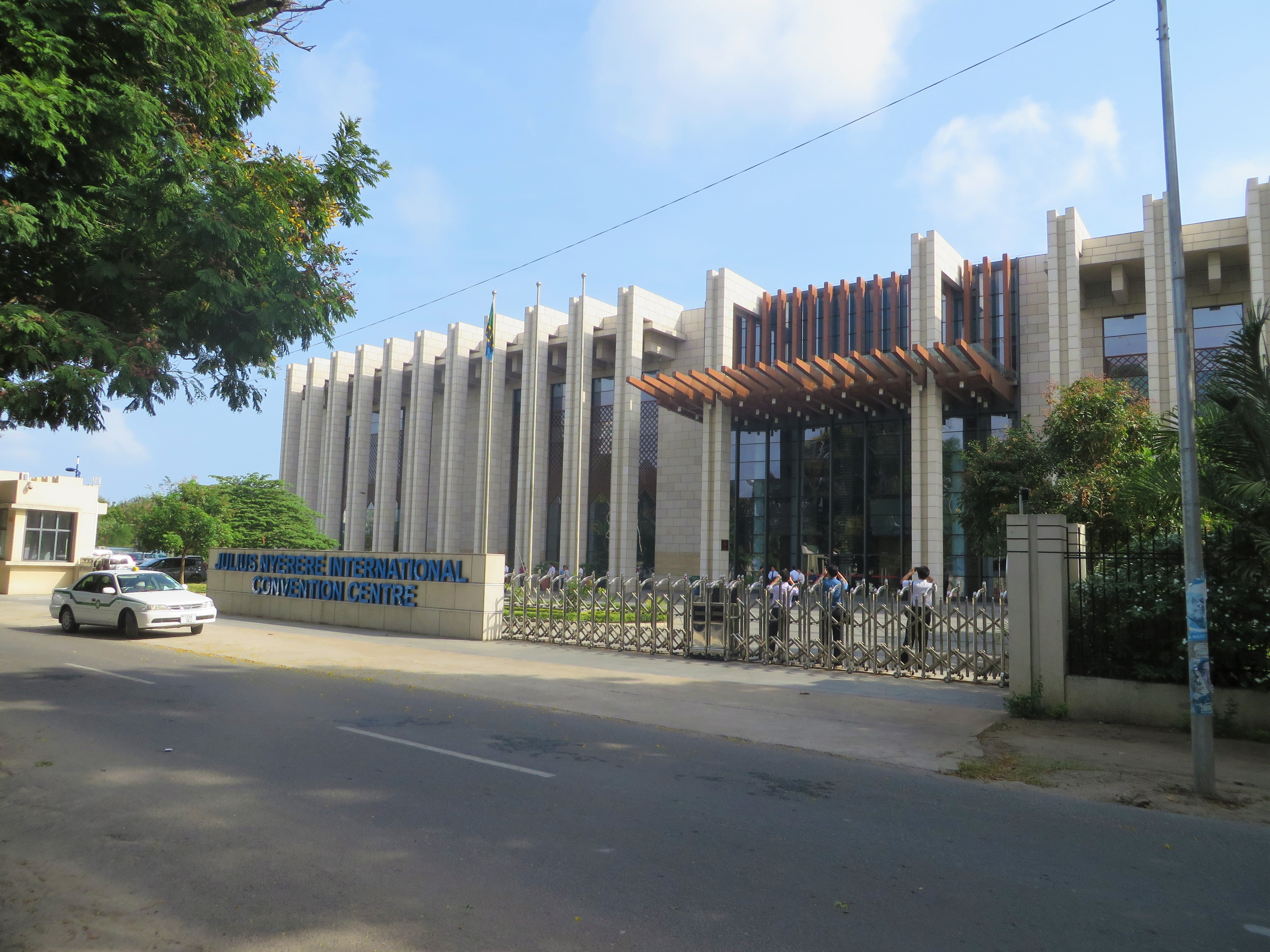
The Julius Nyerere International Convention Centre in Kivukoni

In his 1979 journal A Modern History of Tanganyika, historian John Iliffe wrote, "In 1949 the town became a municipality...[with] four honourable nominated Town Councillors who elected a Mayor." According to Associational Life in African Cities: Popular Responses to the Urban Crisis, published in 2001: "Until June 1996, Dar es Salaam was managed by the Dar es Salaam City Council...the highest policy-making body in the city." As of 2017, Paul Makonda serves as the commissioner of Dar es Salaam Region.

== Demographics ==
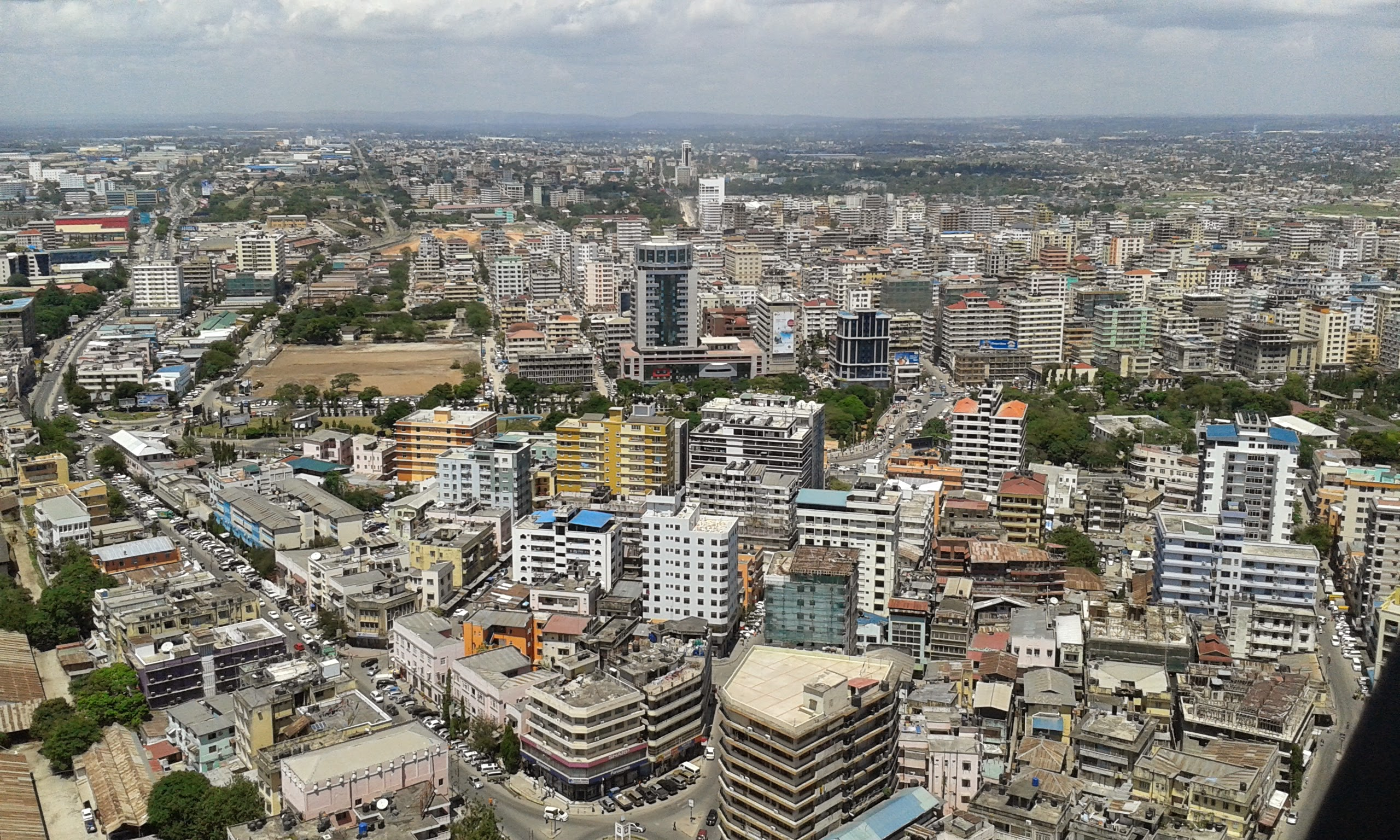
Urban area

Dar es Salaam is the most populous city in Tanzania and the fifth most populous in Africa. In 2020, the population was estimated to be 8 million. Muslims make up 70% of the population in Dar es Salaam.

When the 2012 national census was taken, the city had a population of 4,364,541, about ten percent of the country's total. The average private household size was 3.9 persons compared to the national average of 4.7. Less than half of the city's residents were married, with a rate lower than any other region in the country. The literacy rate in the city was 96%, while the national average was 78%. Between the 2002 and 2012 censuses, the city's 5.6% average annual growth rate was the highest in the country.

More than three-quarters of the city's population live in informal settlements. In 2018, Dar es Salaam scored 0.699 (medium category) on the Human Development Index (HDI). The city's HDI has increased every year since 1992, and it ranked higher than any other region in the country except for one.

Dar es Salaam is the second-fastest-growing city in the world and could have a population as high as 15.9 million by 2030. The population was estimated at 20,000 in 1900, 93,000 in 1957 and 273,000 in 1967.

Census year	Population
1978	843,090
1988	1,360,850
2002	2,487,288
2012	4,364,541
2022	5,383,728

== Economy and infrastructure ==
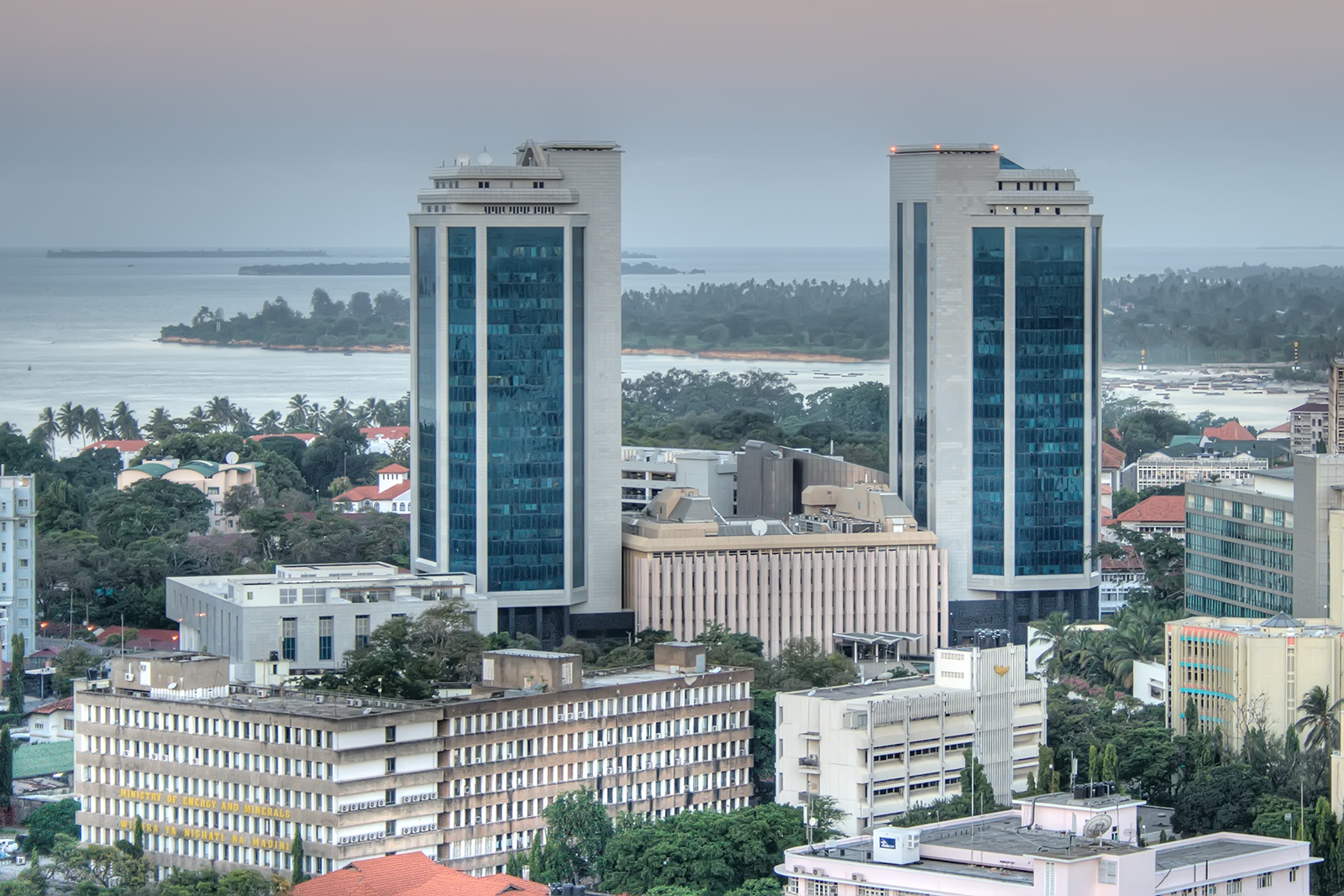
The Bank of Tanzania

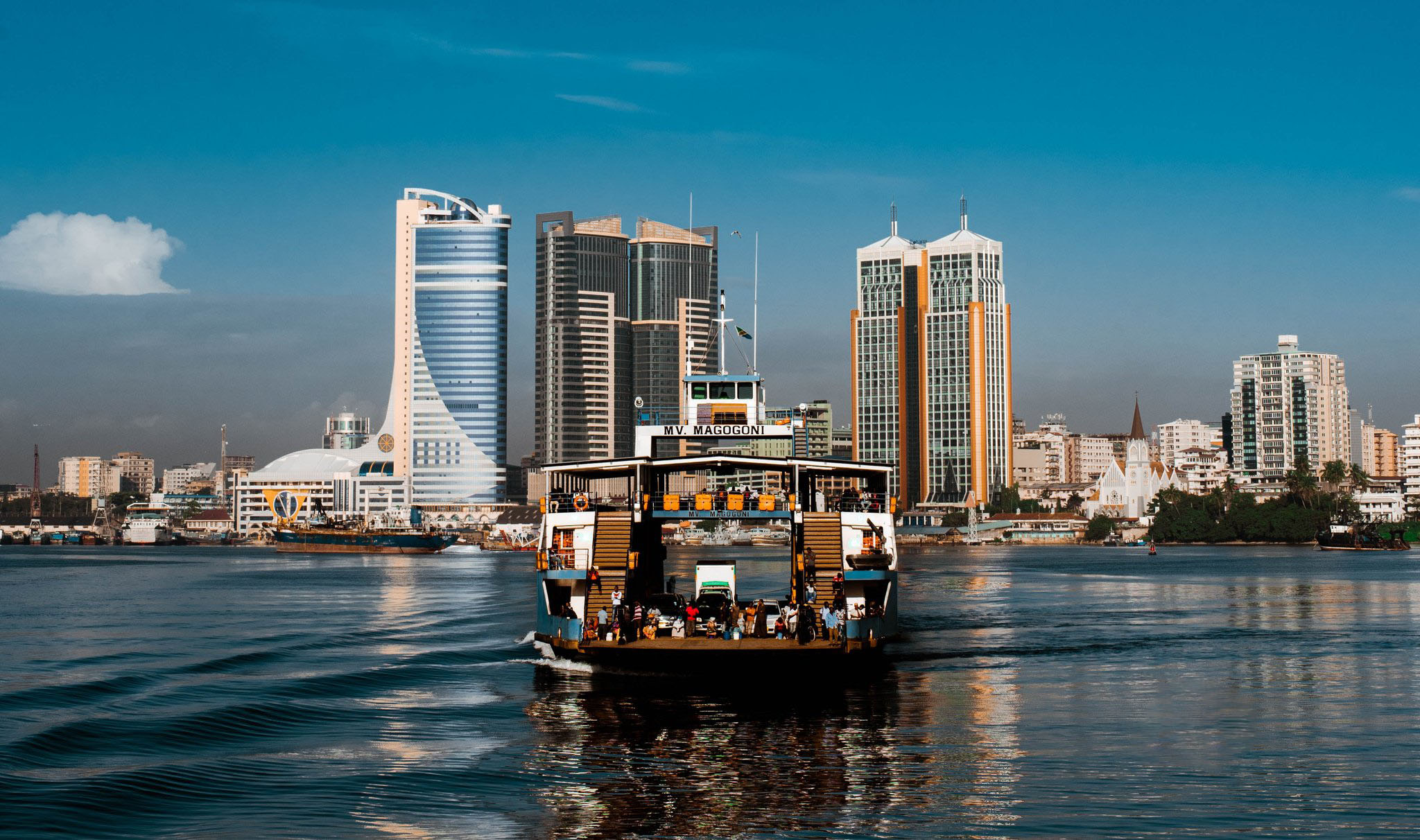
The high rise buildings of Dar es Salaam

Dar es Salaam is Tanzania's most important city for both business and government. The city contains high concentrations of trade and other services and manufacturing compared to other parts of the country, which has about 65 percent of its population in rural areas. Downtown includes small businesses, many of which are run by traders and proprietors whose families originated in the Middle East and the Indian subcontinent—areas of the world with which the settlements of the Tanzanian coast have had long-standing trading relations.

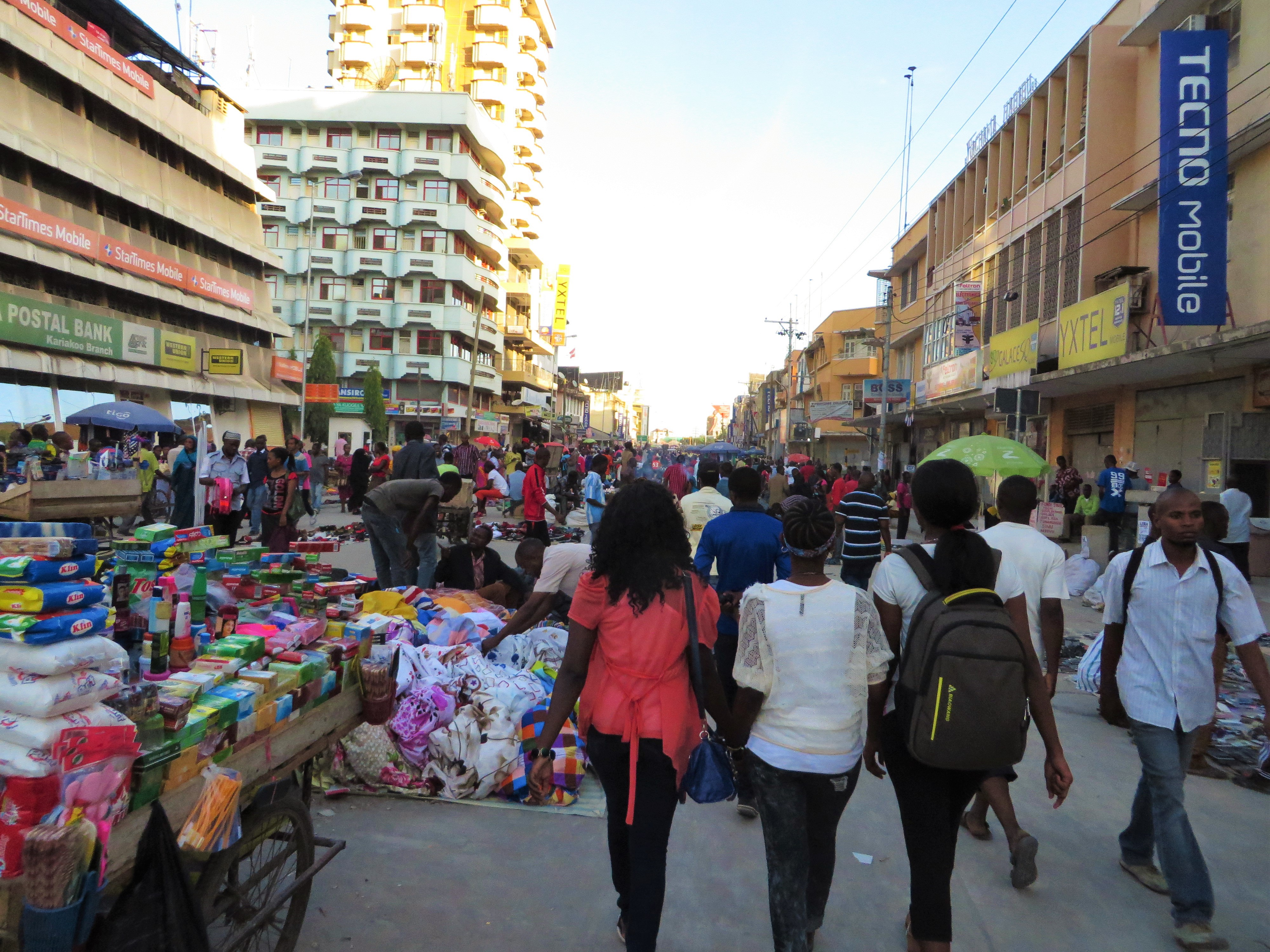
Street view of Kariakoo ward

The Dar es Salaam Central Business District is the largest in Tanzania and comprises the Kisutu, Kivukoni, Upanga and Kariakoo areas. The downtown area is located in the Ilala district. Kivukoni is home to the Tanzania Central Bank, The Bank of Tanzania, the Dar es Salaam Stock Exchange and the city's important Magogoni fish market. With businesses and offices, Kisutu is the location of Dar es Salaam central railway station, the PSPF Towers, and the TPA Tower.

Dar es Salaam is undergoing major construction and development. The 35-storey PSPF Twin Towers are the second tallest building in the city and the country. The city has major infrastructural challenges, including an outdated transport system and occasional power rationing.

The Tanzania Ports Authority headquarters

=== Financial services ===
The Dar es Salaam Stock Exchange (DSE) is the country's first stock market. The headquarters of the Natural Gas Revenue Fund is also here.

=== Retail ===
Dar es Salaam hosts the Mlimani City shopping mall, the City Mall in the Kisutu area, Quality Center Mall, GSM Pugu Shopping Mall, GSM Msasani Mall, and Dar Free Market Mall.

== Transportation ==
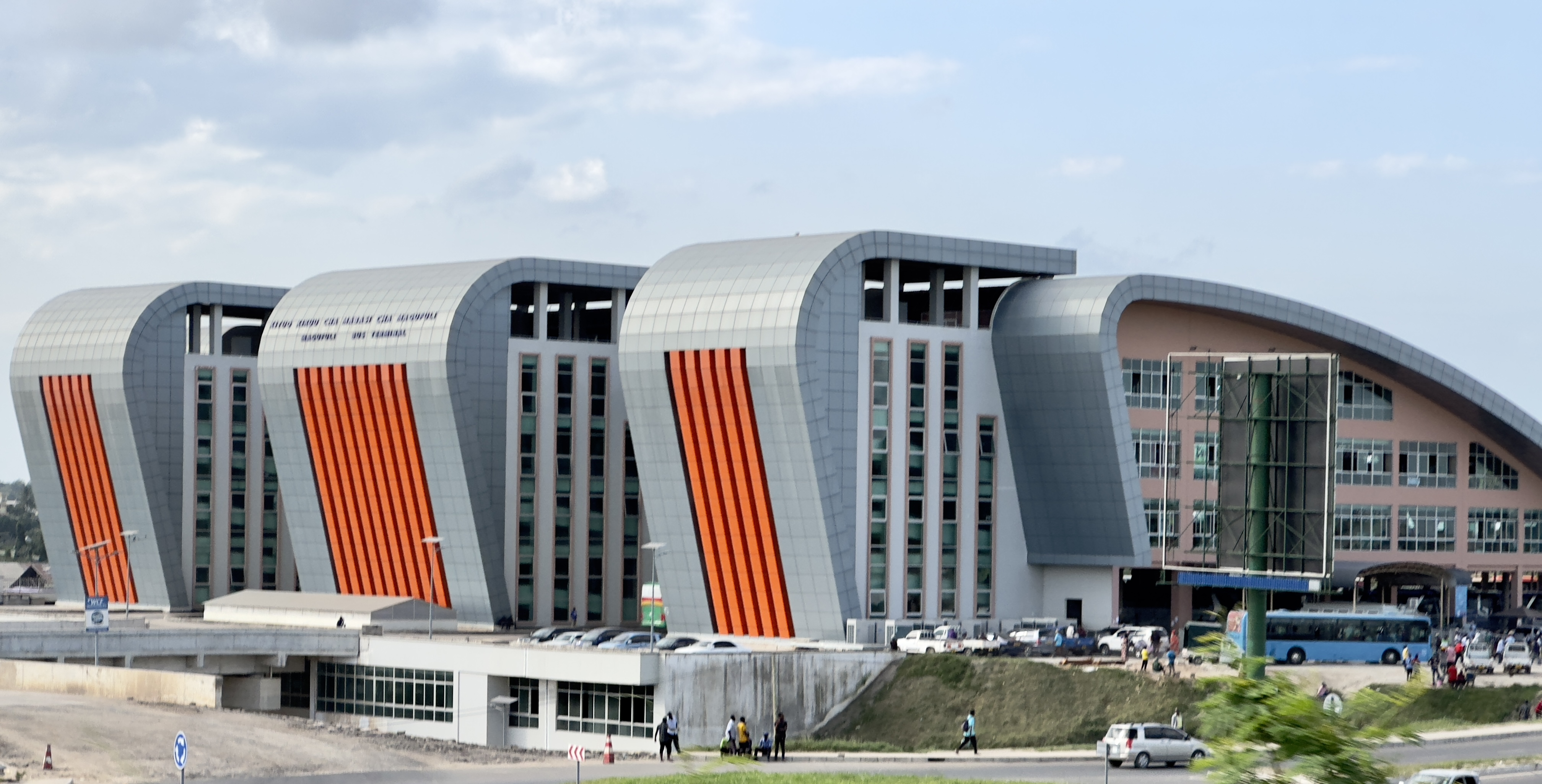
Magufuli Bus Terminal at Mbezi Luis.

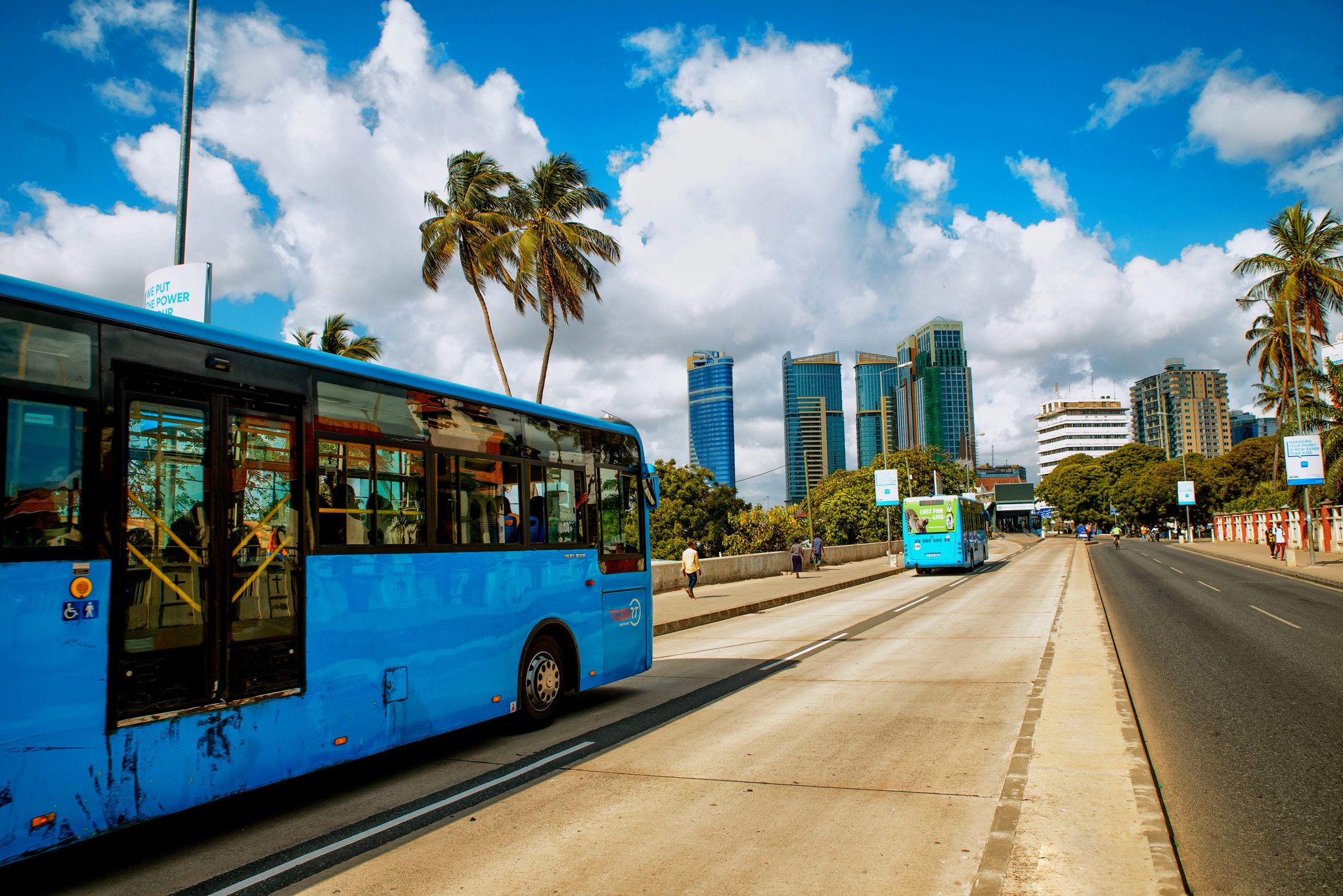
The Dar Rapid Transit (DART) is a bus-based mass-transit system connecting the suburbs of Dar es Salaam to the central business district.

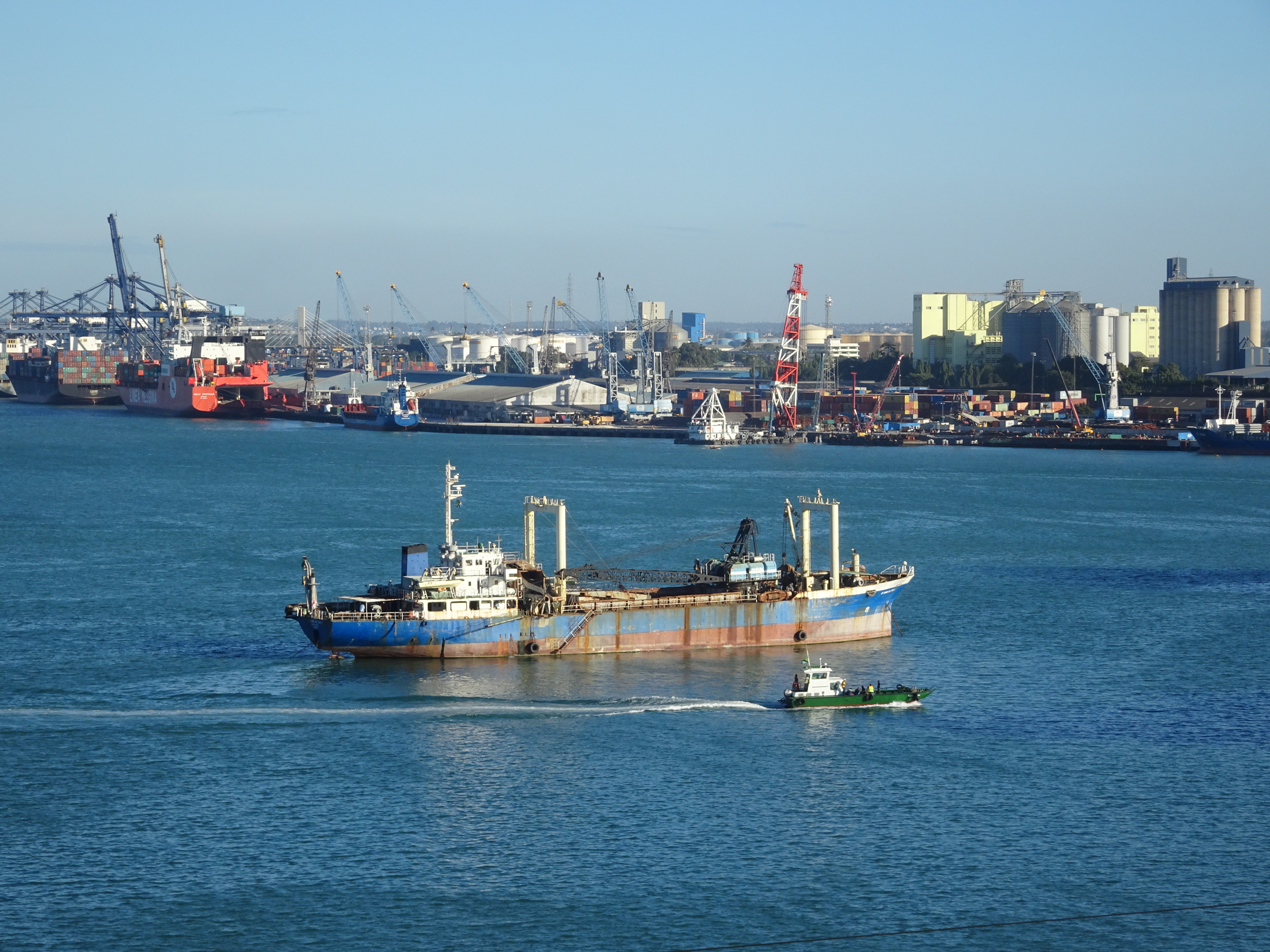
Port activities at Port of Dar es Salaam

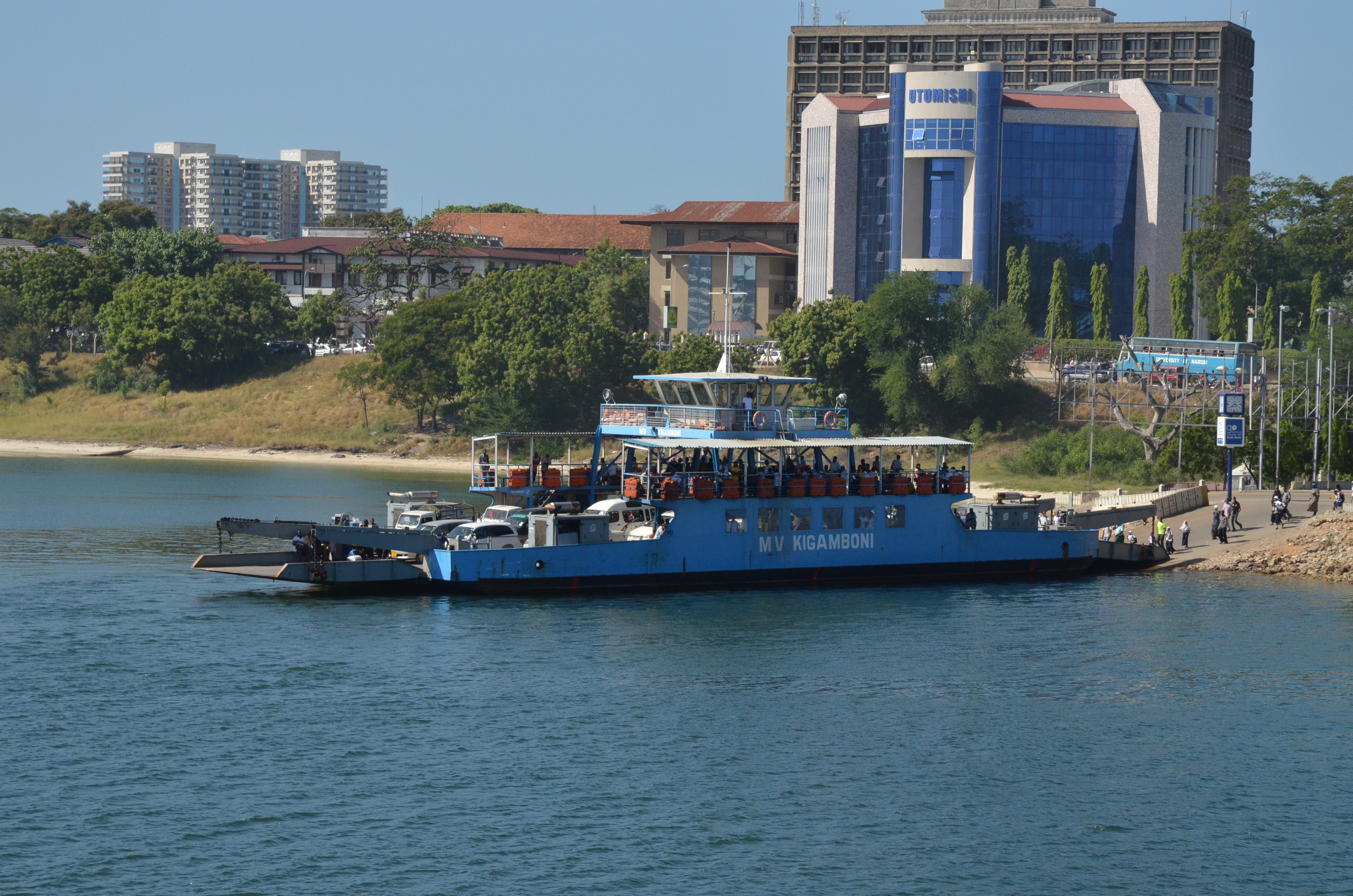
The MV Kigamboni ferries run between southeast Kivukoni to northwest Kigamboni in southeast Dar es Salaam.

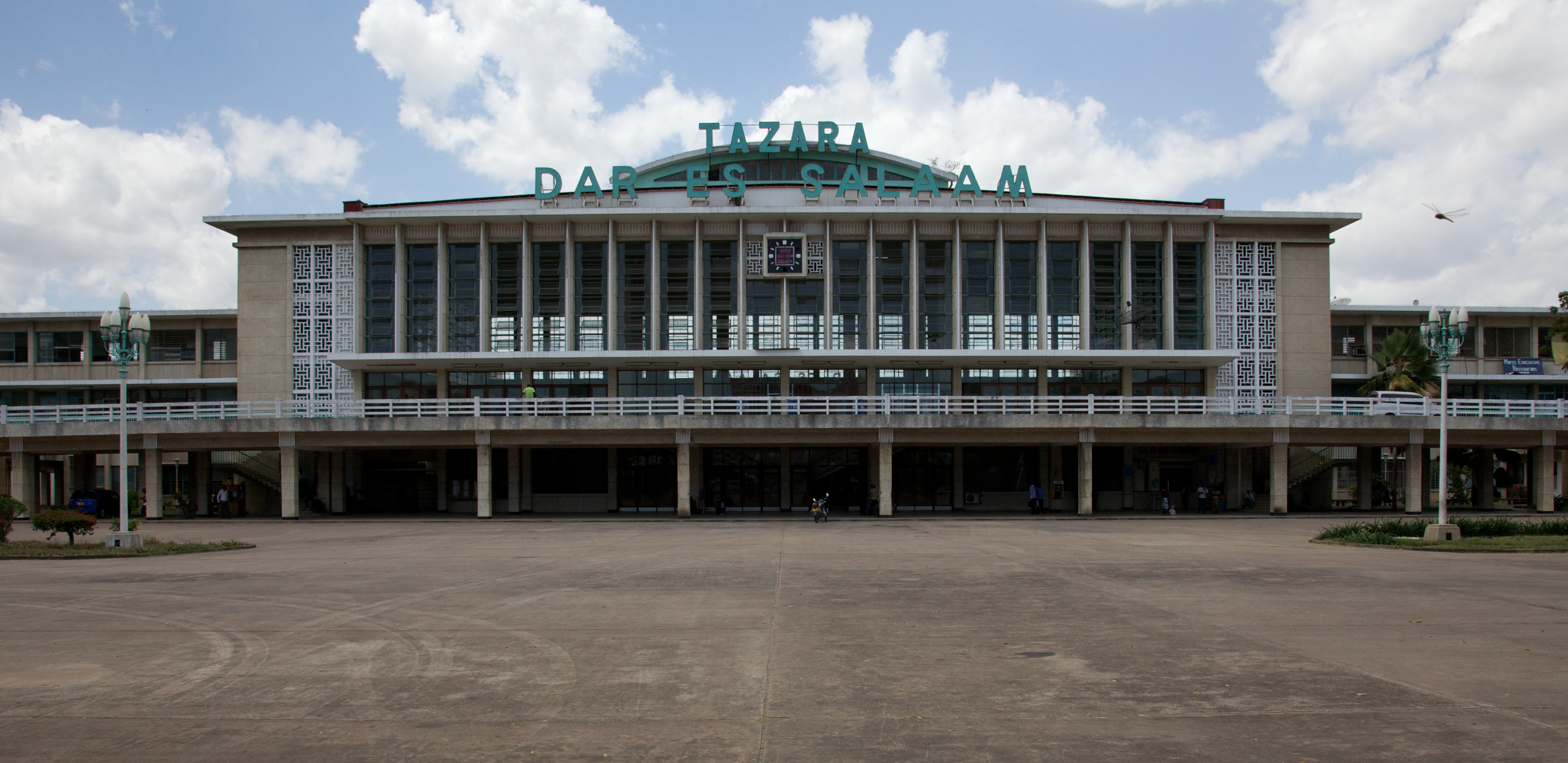
TAZARA Dar es Salaam Station

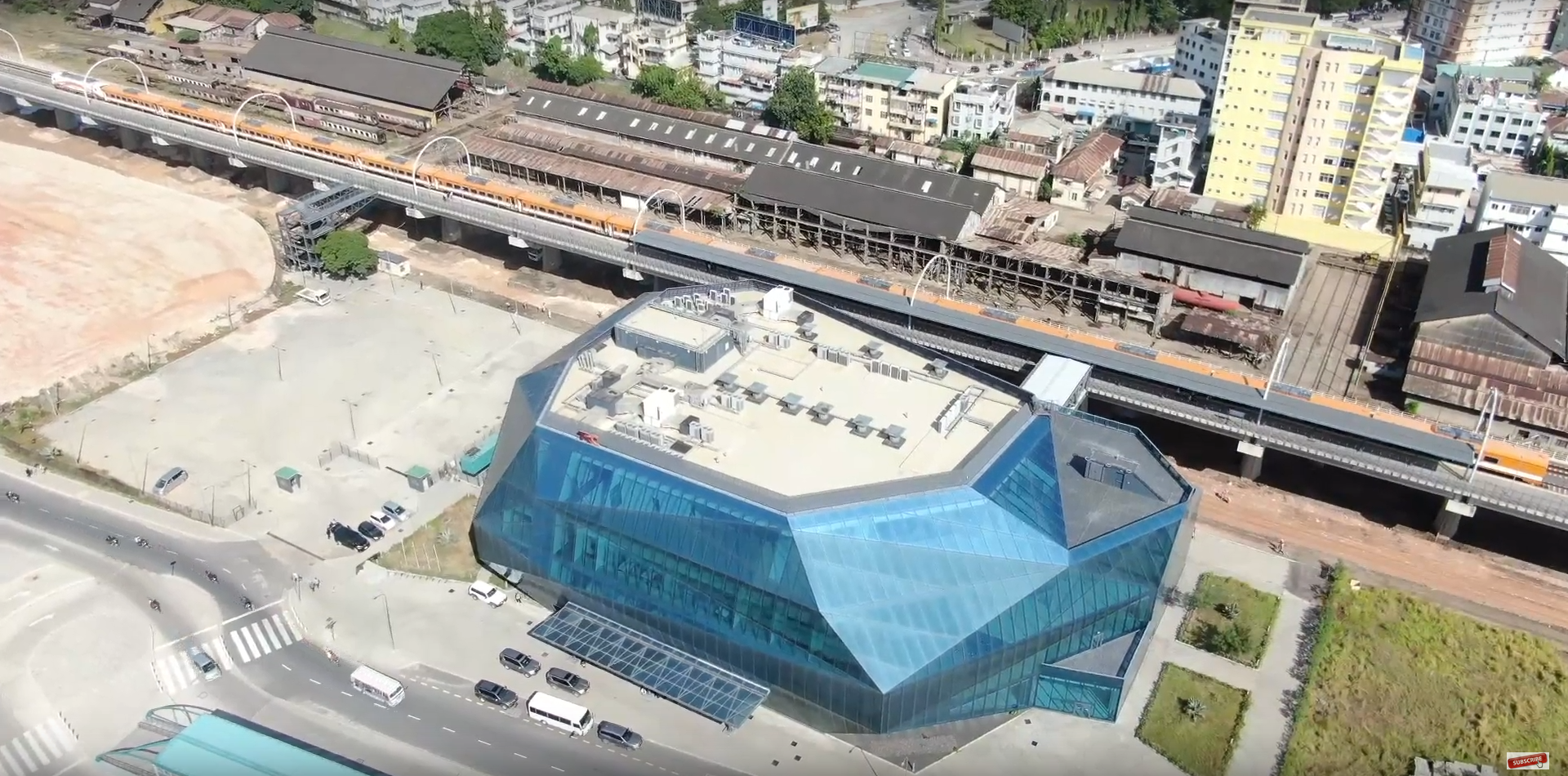
SGR station (blue), as well as the old station, and the new SGR channel

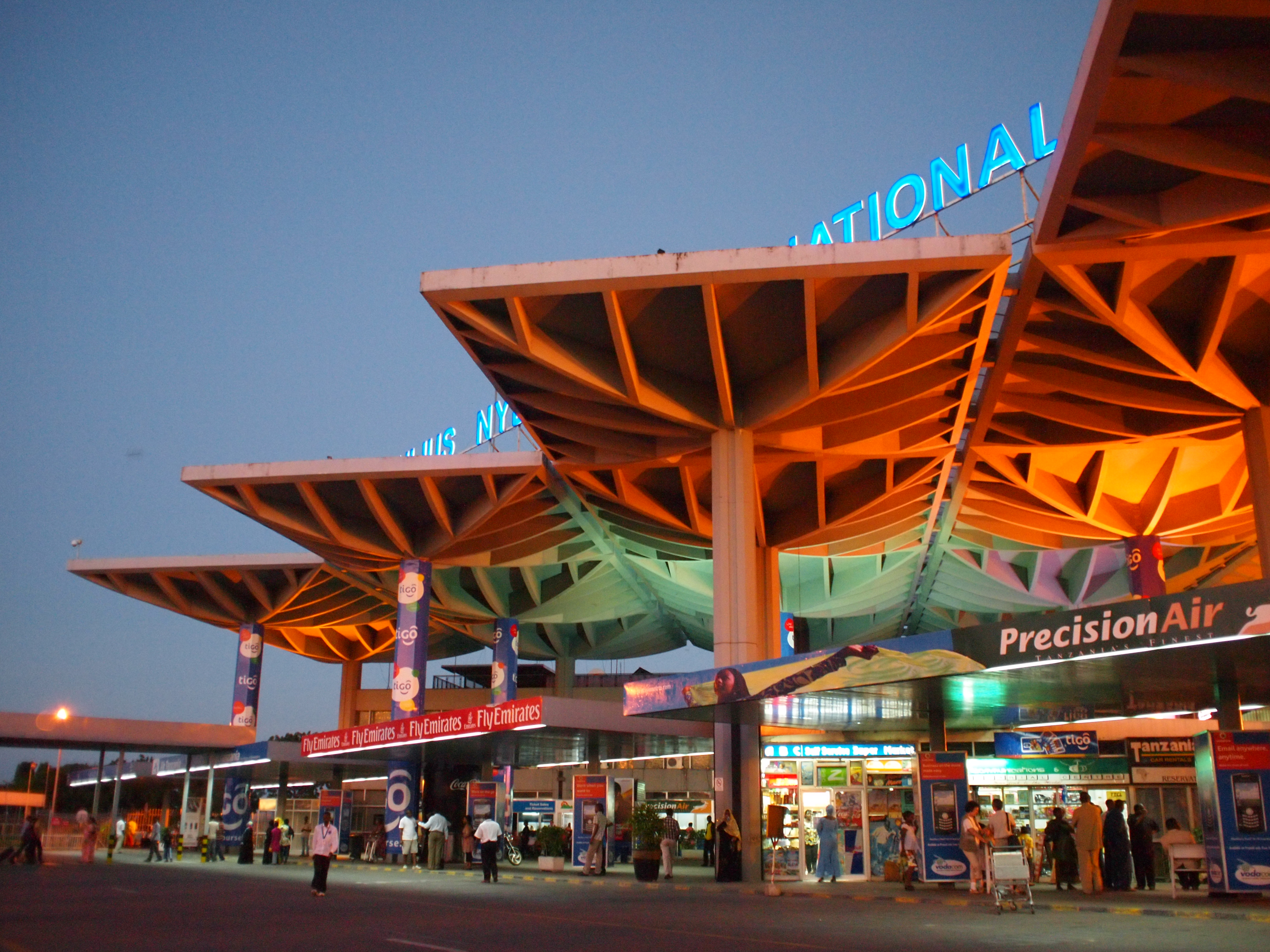
The Julius Nyerere International Airport, Dar es Salaam

On a natural harbour on the Indian Ocean, Dar es Salaam is one of the hubs of the Tanzanian transportation system, as the main railways and several highways originate in or near the city to provide convenient transportation for commuters.

=== Local public transport ===
Public minibus share taxis (dala dala) are the most common form of transport in Dar es Salaam and are often found at the major bus terminals of Makumbusho, Ubungo and other areas of the city. However, since the introduction of the motorcycle transit business known as "bodaboda", most people prefer it, allowing them to get into the city faster as compared with the minibuses, which encounter heavy traffic. Other types of transport include motorcycles and bajaj (auto rickshaws).

==== Bus ====
The government has been introducing a metro bus system, Dar es Salaam bus rapid transit (mwendo kasi in Kiswahili). The metro buses are managed by UDA-RT, a partnership between Usafiri Dar es Salaam (UDA) and the government.

The bus rapid-transit system Phase 1 has been completed by UDA-RT and began operation on 10 May 2016. The first section runs between Kimara in the northwest to Kivukoni on the northern headland of the harbour. Phase 1 was funded by the World Bank, African Development Bank and the Tanzanian government.

==== Metro ====
Dar es Salaam will have a metro system, currently undergoing a feasibility study conducted by Mota-Engil and Dar Rapid Transit Agency.

=== Maritime transport ===
==== Port ====
The Port of Dar es Salaam is Tanzania's busiest, handling 90% of the country's cargo. It is located in the Kurasini administrative ward of Temeke District southeast of the city's central business district. Due to a huge influx of cargo and the slow pace of expansion, a new cargo port 60 km (37 mi) northwest of Dar es Salaam is proposed at Bagamoyo.

==== Ferry ====
MV Kigamboni ferries run between southeast of Kivukoni and northwest of Kigamboni in Dar es Salaam.

=== Railway ===
==== Dar es Salaam commuter rail ====
Travel to urban and suburban parts of the city is provided by the Dar es Salaam commuter rail.

==== Intra-city railway ====
Tanzania Railways operates the Central Line from Dar es Salaam west to Kigoma. Tanzania has completed a high speed rail line connecting Dar es Salaam with the capital Dodoma. The train is capable of cruising speeds of 160 km/hour or 99 miles/hour.

==== International railway ====
The city also hosts the head office of Tanzania–Zambia Railways Authority (TAZARA) built in the late 1960s to early 1970s. The main terminal is located west of Dar es Salaam's central business district in north Yombo Vituka along the Nelson Mandela Road. The TAZARA Railway connects Dar es Salaam to Zambia.

==== Standard gauge railway ====
Tanzania Standard Gauge Railway is a new railway station currently under construction. It will link the country to Rwanda, Uganda, Burundi and Congo.

=== Airport ===
The Julius Nyerere International Airport is the principal airport serving the country, with three operating terminals. Terminal Three is located at Kipawa in Ilala Municipality. The airport is located west of Dar es Salaam's central business district.

== Culture ==
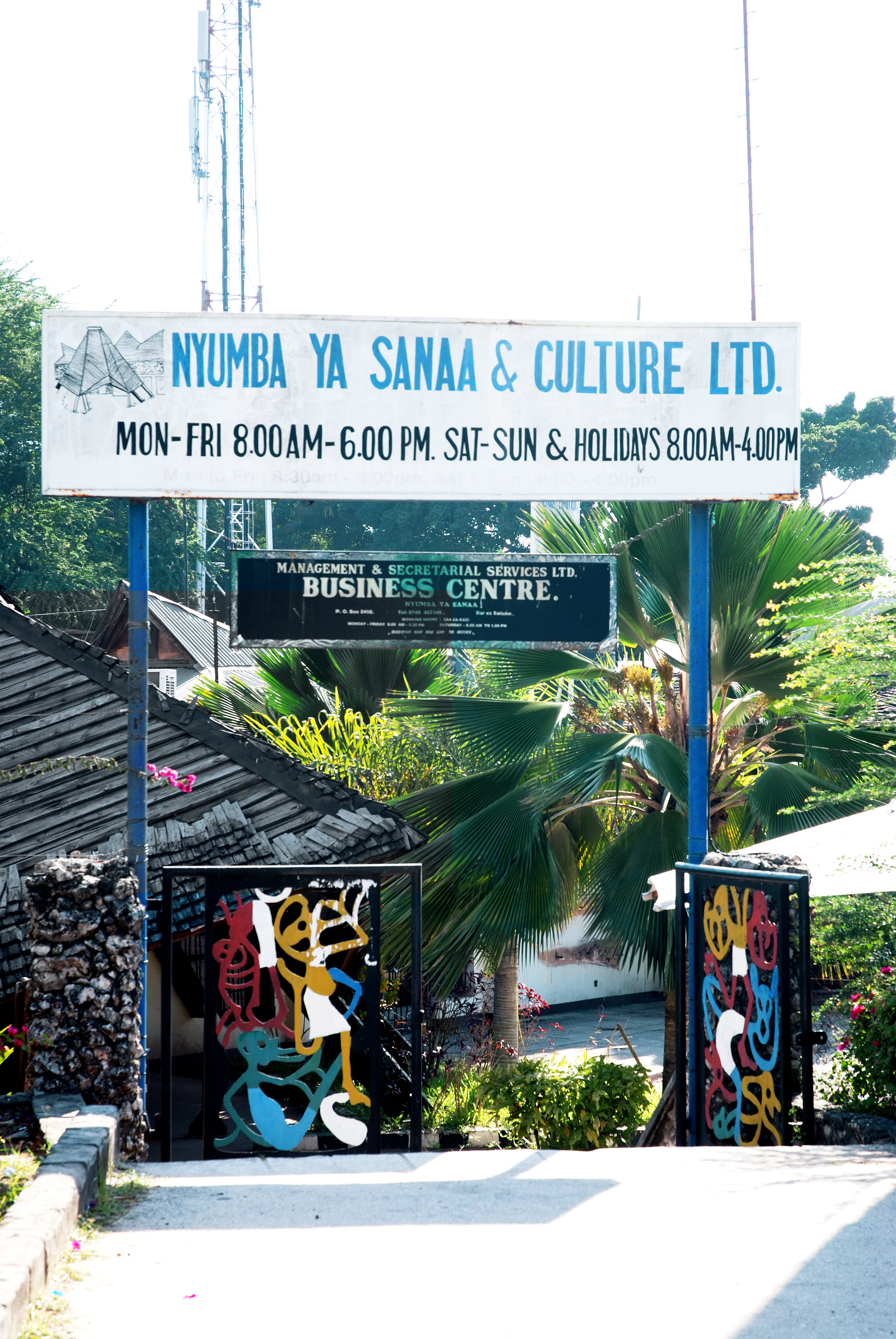
The main gate of Nyumba ya Sanaa, with decorations by Tanzanian sculptor George Lilanga

=== Art ===
The Tingatinga painting style originates from Dar es Salaam. The Nyumba ya sanaa ("House of Art") is a cultural centre, workshop and retail outlet dedicated to Tanzanian art, showcasing and promoting Tanzanian craftsmanship. Prominent Tanzanian sculptor George Lilanga has donated some of his works to the centre, including decorations of the building's main entrance.

=== Music ===
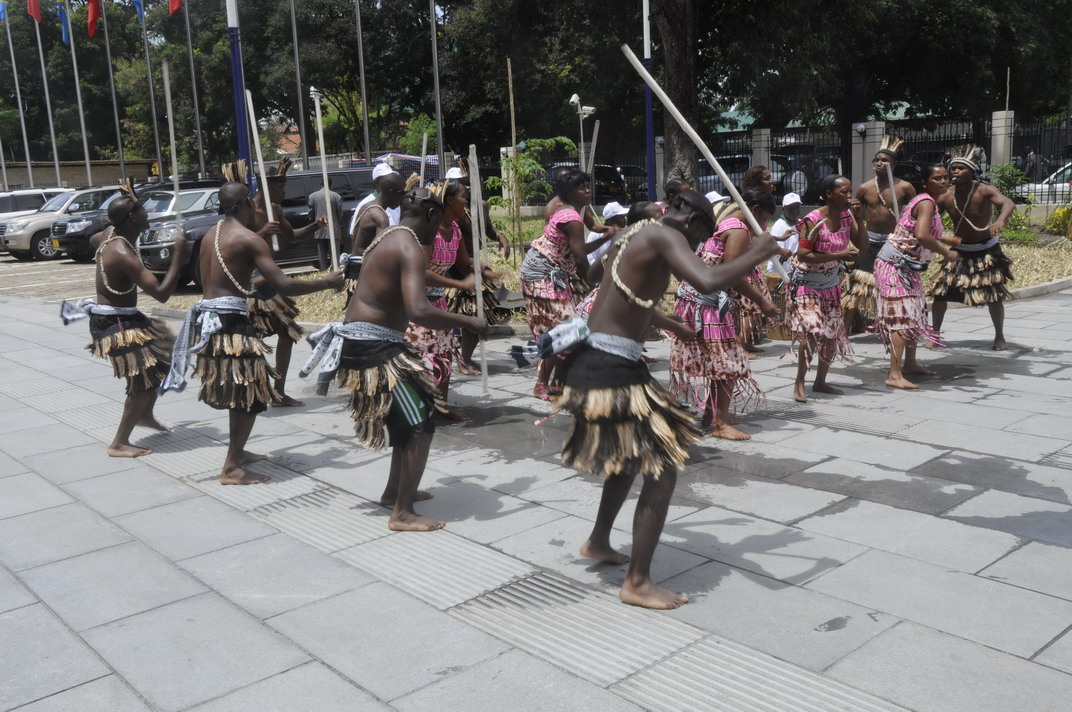
A traditional African dance in Dar es Salaam

The music scene in Dar es Salaam is divided among several styles. The longest-standing style is live dance music (muziki wa dansi) played by bands such as DDC Mlimani Park Orchestra and Malaika Musical Band. Taarab, which was traditionally popular in Zanzibar has also found a niche. However, it remains small compared both to dance music and "Bongo Flava", a broad category representing the Tanzanian take on hip hop and rhythm and blues that has quickly become the most popular locally produced music. The rap music scene is also present. Traditional music, which locally refers to tribal music, is still performed, but typically only on family-oriented occasions such as weddings.

In the 1970s, the Ministry of National Youth Culture aimed to create a national culture stressing the importance of music. Dar es Salaam became the music centre in Tanzania, with the local radio showcasing new bands and dominating the music and cultural scene. With this ujamaa (family) mentality governing culture and music, a unified people's culture was created, leading to the rise of hip hop culture. Throughout the years, the radio in Dar es Salaam has played a major role in the dissemination of music, because many people do not have television; cassettes are more common than CDs.

=== Tourism ===
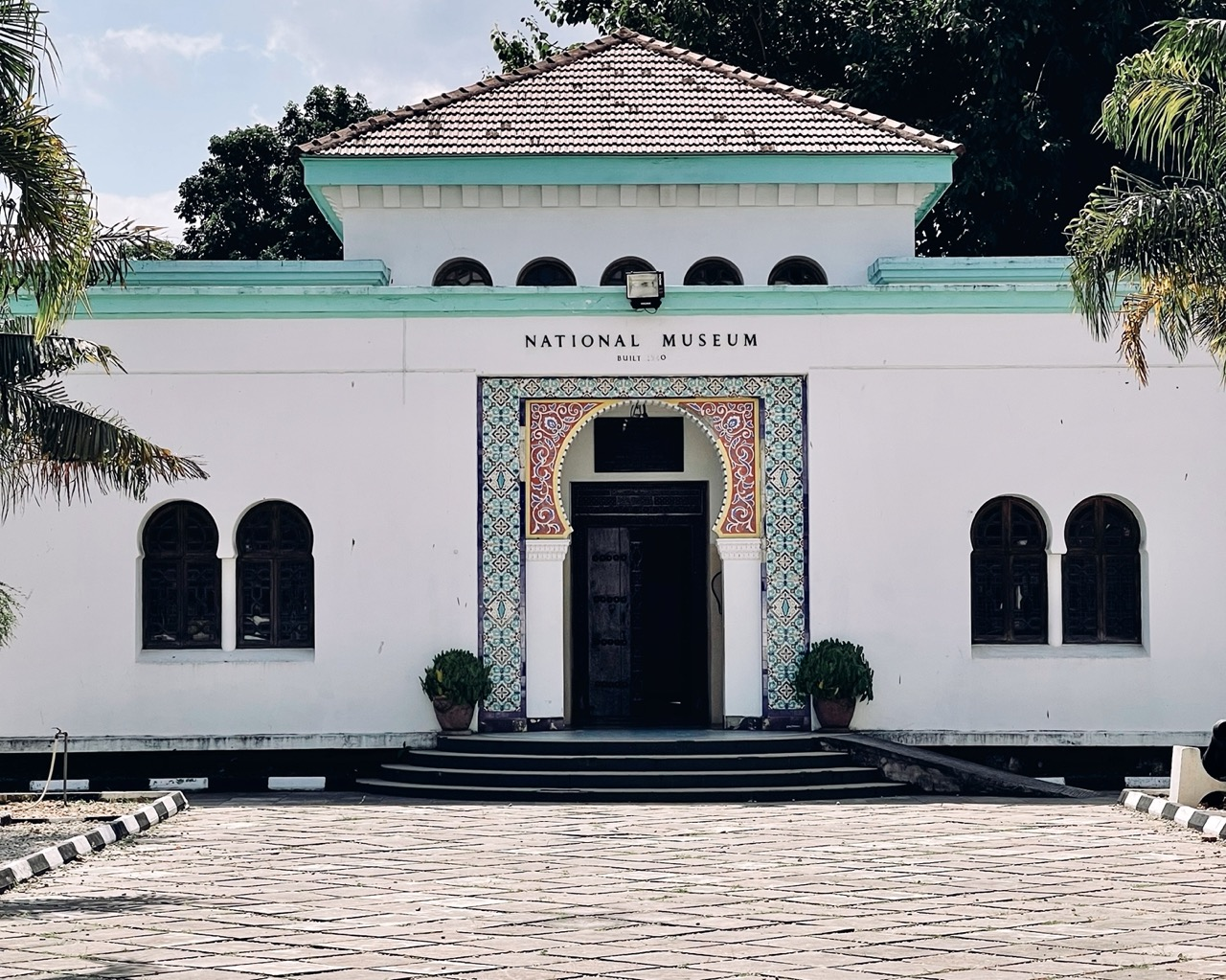
National Museum of Tanzania

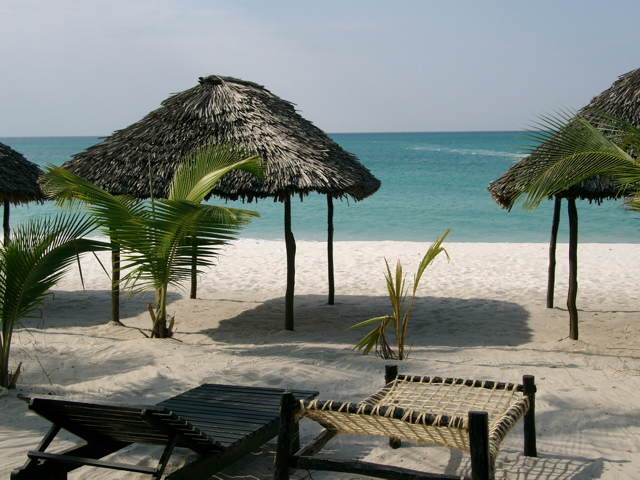
Beach on the peninsula of Kigamboni, Dar es Salaam

Dar es Salaam has two of the five museums that make up the National Museum of Tanzania consortium, namely the National Museum proper and the Makumbusho Cultural Centre & Village Museum. The National Museum is dedicated to the history of Tanzania; most notably, it exhibits some of the bones of Paranthropus boisei that were among the findings of Louis Leakey at Olduvai. In 2016, there was a breakthrough discovery in Northern Tanzania by a scientist, from the University of Dar es Salaam, of footprints thought to be of a hominid that predates Homo sapiens. The Makumbusho Cultural Centre & Village Museum, located in the outskirts of the city on the road to Bagamoyo, showcases traditional huts from 16 different Tanzanian ethnic groups. There are also examples of traditional cultivation, as well as daily traditional music and dance shows. Close to the National Museum are also the botanical gardens, with tropical plants and trees.

There are beaches on the Msasani peninsula north of Dar es Salaam and in Kigamboni to the south. Bongoyo Island can be reached by boat from the Msasani Slipway.

== Places of worship ==
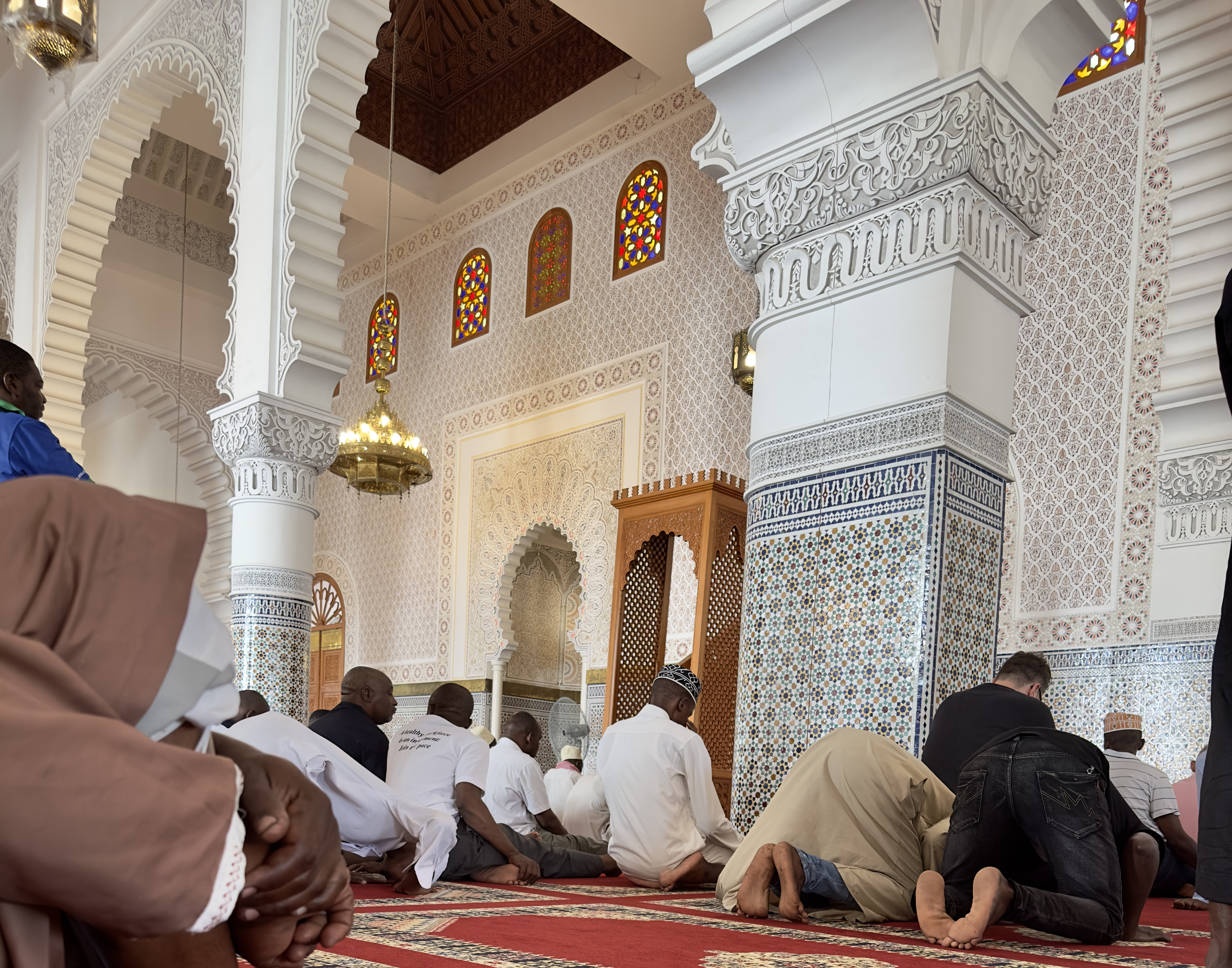
Interior of Mohammed VI mosque.

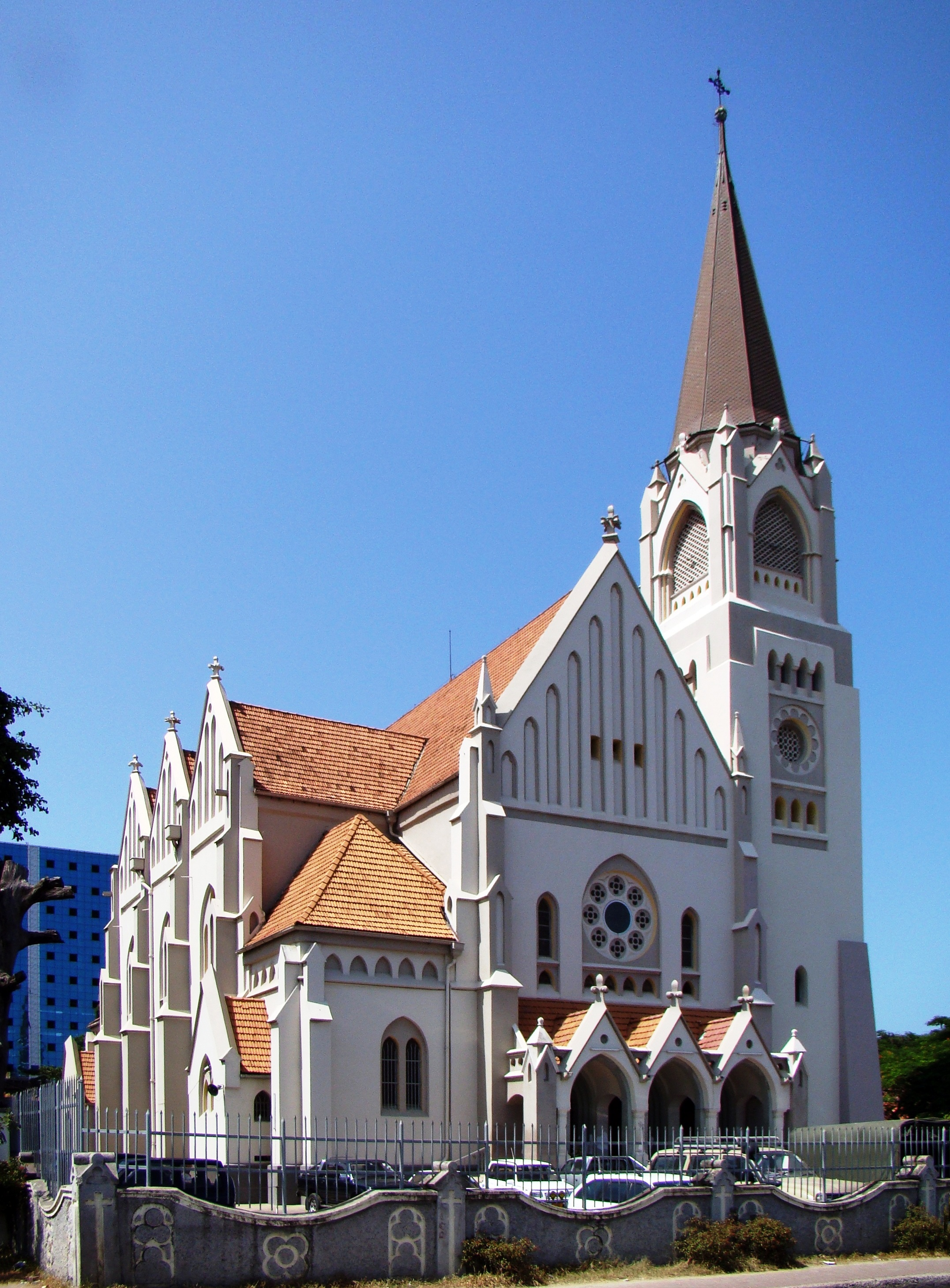
Saint Joseph's Metropolitan Cathedral. Christianity is the largest religion in Tanzania.

The city is home to several churches and mosques. Islam is the most practiced religion in the city with 70% of the population being Muslim. Notable mosques in the city include Mohammed VI mosque, Masjid Mamuur Mosque, Qiblatein Mosque, Ngazija Mosque and Manyema Mosque. The churches in the city belong to various denominations; for example, the Roman Catholic Archdiocese of Dar es Salaam (Catholic Church), Anglican Church of Tanzania (Anglican Communion), Evangelical Lutheran Church in Tanzania (Lutheran World Federation), Baptist Convention of Tanzania (Baptist World Alliance), Ilala Seventh Day Adventist Church and Assemblies of God. There are also a number of Hindu temples, such as Shree Shankarashram temple, Shree Sanatan Dharma Sabha temple, Swaminarayan temple.

== Sports ==
=== Stadium ===
Dar es Salaam is the sports centre of Tanzania and hosts the second-largest stadium in East and Central Africa, the National Stadium, which can accommodate up to 60,000 people.

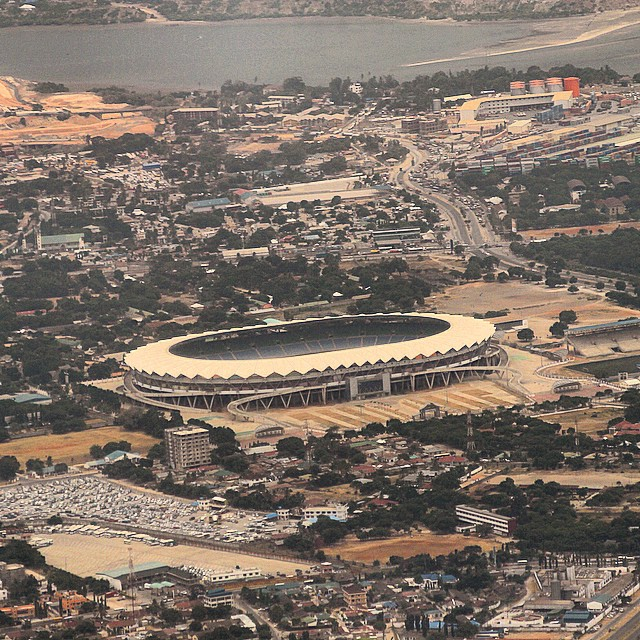
Aerial view of the Tanzania National Main Stadium, with the Kurasini estuary in the background

=== Association football ===
The Tanzanian National Stadium hosts football clubs based in Dar es Salaam: Young Africans and Simba. It also hosts other Tanzanian football clubs and international matches. A new stadium in Dodoma with a much larger capacity has been proposed by the government as a donation from Morocco.

Apart from the National Stadium, the city is home to two other stadiums: the Uhuru Stadium, the Karume Memorial Stadium and Chamazi Stadium. The Uhuru Stadium is used mainly for local tournaments and political gatherings, whilst the Karume Memorial Stadium is situated west of Kurasini and home to the Tanzania Football Federation. Azam Complex Chamazi is owned by Azam Football Club.

=== Golf ===
The Gymkhana Golf Courses located northwest of the Kivukoni area (between the city centre overlooking the shores of the Indian Ocean in the east and Barack Obama Drive), also have tennis courts, squash courts, and a fitness club. Outside of the metropolitan districts is Lugalo Military Golf Course located in the Lugalo Military Barracks.

=== Acrobatics ===
Founded in 2003, Mama Africa is a school known for training some of Africa's professional acrobats.

=== Boxing ===
Boxing is a popular sport in Tanzania and Dar es Salaam hosts numerous boxing galas organised throughout the year. Tanzanian professional boxer Francis Checka is the current World Boxing Federation (WBF) Super Middleweight Champion.

== Media ==
=== Newspapers ===
The head office of Tanzania Telecommunications Company Ltd at Extelecom Building in Samora Avenue, east of Kisutu

Newspapers in Dar es Salaam are often sold by vendors weaving through stationary traffic at road intersections. English-language newspapers, with online versions, include The Citizen and The Guardian. Swahili dailies Tanzania Daima and Mwananchi are also available. Business Times is the only financial and economic newspaper in the city; it was established in 1988 and became the first private newspaper in Tanzania. Business Times owns Majira, another Swahili newspaper.

=== Television stations ===
Dar es Salaam is home to ITV, Sibuka, Channel Ten Television Station (formerly Dar es Salaam Television [DTV]) and Azam TV, a subscription-based service from the Azam group of companies.

Television station Ayo TV is based in Ubungo, Dar es Salaam, as is the Tanzania Broadcasting Corporation.

=== Internet access ===
The ship-like building of Airtel Tanzania headquarters in Dar es Salaam

Installation of the trans-Indian Ocean backbone cable (SEACOM) in 2009 has, in theory, made Internet access much more readily available in Dar es Salaam in particular and in East Africa in general. However, roll-out to end-users is currently slow. Telephone-line coverage provided by the Tanzania Telecommunications Company Limited is limited, prices are high, and long contracts are required for purchase of bandwidth for small Internet service providers. The expressed aim of the SEACOM cable is to enable East Africa to develop economically through increased online trading.

Internet cafés are found in the city centre, and free Wi-Fi hotspots are available in various government and nongovernment institutions as well as public transport.

Mobile-telephone access to the Internet via 4G is still relatively expensive, though 5G is making its way through major cities and towns as of 2022 with plans to go nationwide in the advanced stages.

=== Radio ===
Dar es Salaam's first radio station began operation in the early 1950s with "little more equipment than a microphone and a blanket hung over a wall..." This project was overseen by Edward Twining.

== Environment ==
Since the 1990s, Dar es Salaam has experienced heavy and frequent flooding due to intense rainfall. The city is especially vulnerable to flooding, due to its lowland coastal orientation and the fact that the Msimbazi River flows through the city. The situation has worsened over the years, both due to climate change and the expansion of city pavement, which increases surface runoff.

In 2019, flooding displaced 1,215 households. Between 2017 and 2018, the city experienced seven floods. The World Bank estimates that exposure to floods has impacted about 2 million people, or 25% of the population in Dar es Salaam. Flooding incidents destroy bridges and roads, disrupt transportation, increase risk of diseases such as cholera and skin infection, and are a barrier to reducing poverty.

== Education ==
Dar es Salaam has the highest literacy rate in the country, with 93.9% of the residents being literate, compared to the national average of 77.9%. The city's GER lacks in comparison to the rest of the country with 96.1%, which is however still sufficient. On the other hand, its secondary GER is one of the highest in the country (61.8%).

=== Universities ===
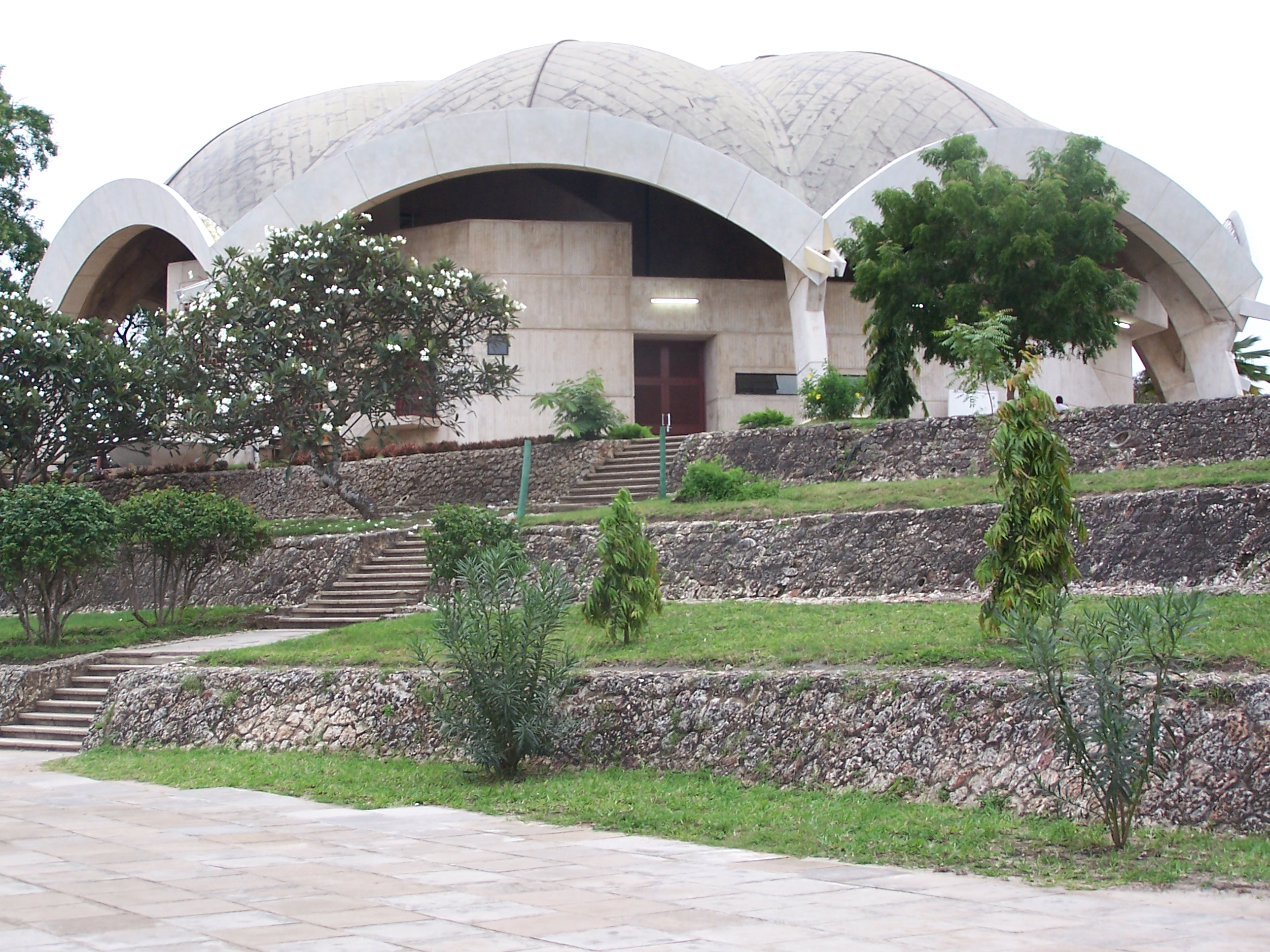
Nkrumah Hall at the University of Dar es Salaam

- The University of Dar es Salaam is the oldest and second largest public university in Tanzania after the University of Dodoma. It is located in the western part of the city in north-east Ubungo, and occupies 1,625 acres (6.58 km^{2}) on Observation Hill, 13 km (8 mi) from the city centre. The university has 16,400 undergraduate and 2,700 postgraduate students.
- Ardhi University (ARU) was established on 1 July 1996 after transforming the former University College of Lands and Architectural Studies (UCLAS), which was then a Constituent College of the University of Dar es Salaam. Historically, Ardhi University, dates back to 1956 when it started as Surveying Training School offering land surveying technician certificate courses at the present location of Mgulani Salvation Army Camp in Dar es Salaam. In 1958, the school was moved to the present location on Observation Hill. At present, there are over 80 PhD holders who have graduated from over 25 universities worldwide. The university comprises four schools, one institute and several centres, and offers undergraduate and postgraduate studies with postgraduate, bachelor's, master's and PhD degrees in various disciplines.
- The Muhimbili University of Health and Allied Sciences consists of Muhimbili Campus and Mloganzila Campus. Muhimbili Campus is situated in Upanga, Ilala Municipality, along United Nations Road. Mloganzila Campus occupies 3,800 acres (15 km^{2}) and is located 3 km (2 mi) off the Dar es Salaam-Morogoro highway, 25 km (16 mi) from Dar es Salaam.
- The Open University of Tanzania is a full-fledged, accredited public institution of higher learning, featuring programmes leading to certificates, diplomas, undergraduate and postgraduate qualifications. Since it was founded, the university has enrolled students from Malawi, Uganda, Kenya, Namibia, Hungary, Burundi, Libya, Ethiopia, Rwanda, Saudi Arabia, Lesotho, Botswana and most of Tanzania. As of 2008, total enrolment was 44,099, the majority of which was Tanzanian.
- Hubert Kairuki Memorial University is a private institution located on plot No. 322 Regent Estate in the Mikocheni area, about 7 km (4 mi) from Dar es Salaam's city centre, off Ali Hassan Mwinyi and Old Bagamoyo Roads.
- International Medical and Technological University is a privately owned institute of higher education.
- Kampala International University began operations in 2009. The University Centre is situated on 60 acres (240,000 m^{2}) of land in the Gongo la Mboto area, Ilala District, 7 km (4 mi) from Mwalimu Julius Nyerere International Airport along Pugu Road.

== Notable people ==
- Sir David Frank Adjaye (born 1966), London-based architect born in Dar es Salaam
- C.A. "Peter" Bransgrove (1914–1966), architect in Dar es Salaam from 1947 to 1966
- Joaquim Chissano (born 1939), second President of Mozambique, from 1986 to 2005; headed the FRELIMO headquarters in Dar es Salaam
- Kanyama Chiume (1929–2007), a leading nationalist in the struggle for Malawi's independence in the 1950s and 1960s and Minister
- Roald Dahl (1916–1990), British novelist, short-story writer and poet who lived in Dar es Salaam from 1934 to 1939
- Jane Goodall (1934–2025), scientist and primatologist
- Gertrud von Hassel (1908–1999), German teacher and painter
- Marin Hinkle (born 1966), actress, Two and a Half Men TV show
- Rachel Luttrell (born 1971), actress, Stargate Atlantis, born in Dar es Salaam
- Nairn McEwan (1941–2018), Scotland rugby union player and second national coach, born in Dar es Salaam.
- Bibi Titi Mohammed (1926–2000), politician and chair of the women's branch of TANU
- Yoweri Museveni (born 1944), president of Uganda since 1986
- Godfrey Mwakikagile (born 1949), prominent Tanzanian author, Africanist scholar and journalist
- Juma Mwapachu (1942–2025), Tanzanian diplomat, lawyer and author of books on African politics and economics; served as secretary-general of the East African Community (EAC)
- Carmelita Namashulua (born 1962), politician and Minister of Education and Human Development for Mozambique, previously Minister of State Administration and the Public Service of Mozambique (2015–2020)
- Herieth Paul (born 1995), fashion model
- Walter Rodney (1942–1980), Guyanese historian, political activist; author of How Europe Underdeveloped Africa
- Justinian Rweyemamu (1942–1982), Tanzanian economist, author and professor of economics at the University of Dar es Salaam; worked at the United Nations; economic adviser to Tanzania's first president, Julius Nyerere
- Mbwana Samatta (born 1992), footballer, 2015 CAF African Player of the Year; 68 caps for Tanzania
- Issa G. Shivji (born 1946), Tanzanian scholar, and expert on constitutional law and development issues
- Ally Sykes (1926–2013), politician and leading figure in Tanzania's independence movement
- Hasheem Thabeet (born 1987), basketball player in the US
- Paul von Lettow-Vorbeck (1870–1964), commander of the German East Africa Army
- Kontawa (born 1996), musician and actor

== International relations ==
Dar es Salaam is sister cities with:

- Hamburg, Germany
- Mumbai, India
- Samsun, Turkey
- Changzhou, Jiangsu, China
- Sari, Iran
- Dallas, Texas, United States
