= Kontawa =

- Born: July 12, 1996 (age 29); Dar es Salaam, Tanzania
- Origin: Dar es Salaam, Tanzania
- Genres: Hip Hop; Bongo Flava; Singeli
- Occupations: Rapper; Brand Influencer; Singer-songwriter; Actor; Model
- Instruments: Vocalist; Rapping; Singing; Beat boxing
- Years active: 2019–present
- Labels: BWG

Abdu Hamid Said, popularly known as Kontawa (born July 12, 1996, in Dar es Salaam, Tanzania), is a Tanzanian rapper, singer, songwriter, actor, model, and brand influencer. In 2023, he won the Best Upcoming Artist of the Year award at the 2022 Tanzania Music Awards. In 2024, he was nominated among the best Rappers at the Tanzania Music Awards.

== Early life ==
Kontawa was born and raised in Dar es Salaam, Tanzania, in a family of five children. He developed an interest in music from an early age, and his upbringing in Tanzania influenced his musical style, which blends genres such as hip hop, bongo flava, and singeli. Before he became a musician, he sold secondhand clothes.

== Musical career ==
Kontawa entered the Tanzanian music scene in 2019 with his debut single "Sura ya Baba". Kontawa has since released several other popular tracks, including Champion Ft. Nay Wa Mitego, Champion Remix Ft. Harmonize, Dunga Mawe, Mwalimu and Daktari.

He has been compared to the late Tanzanian rapper GodZilla.

In March 2023, Kontawa collaborated with Maua Sama on the single Sikuachi.

In September 2023, Kontawa handed military uniforms that he had used during his performances to the Tanzanian Defense Force, showcasing his respect for the country's armed forces.

== Awards and recognition ==
At the 2023 Tanzania Music Awards, Kontawa was named Best Upcoming Artist. In November 2023 the Bongo Flava musician Madee praised Kontawa as one of the most promising artists of the year.

== Acting career ==
In 2024, Kontawa appeared in the music-based film Dhahabu.
