= Religion in Tanzania =

Religion in Tanzania (2022 Afrobarometer)
1. Christianity (57%)
2. Islam (37%)
3. Other / None (6%)

Christianity is the largest religion in Tanzania, with a substantial Muslim population as well. Smaller minority populations of Animists, African traditional religions amongst other faith practitioners, and religiously unaffiliated people are also present.

Tanzania is officially a secular state, and freedom of religion is enshrined in the country's constitution. Both Christian and Islamic feasts are recognized as public holidays.

== Statistics ==
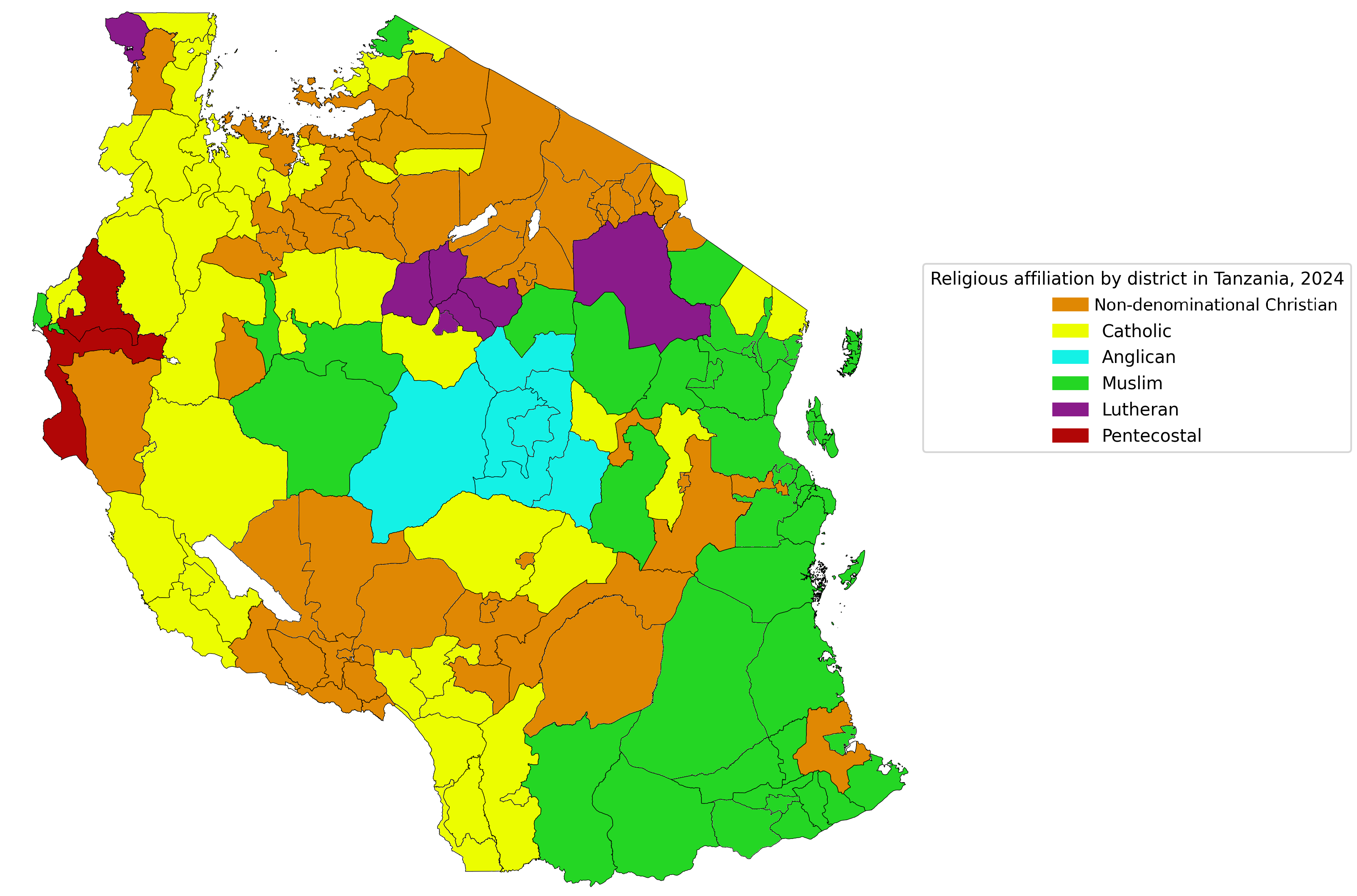
Largest religious denomination by district in Tanzania according to Afrobarometer 2024 survey

Religion in Tanzania (CIA World Factbook 2020)
1. Christianity (63.1%)
2. Islam (34.1%)
3. Traditional faiths (1.10%)
4. Other religions (0.10%)
5. Unspecified (1.60%)

Current statistics on the relative sizes of various religions in Tanzania are limited because religious questions have been eliminated from government census reports since 1967. Estimates for 2010 published by the Pew Research Center in 2012 indicated that 61.4% of the population were Christian, 35.2% Muslim, 1.8% practiced traditional folk religions and 1.4% were unaffiliated. A projection by the Pew Research Center based on these numbers estimated that 63% of the population in 2020 were Christian, 34% Muslim, 2% unaffiliated and 1% adhered to various Folk religions.

According to projections from the Association of Religion Data Archives (ARDA) which is based on the World Religion Database (1900-2050), 54.6% of the population is Christian, 32.8% is Muslim, 10.8% practices traditional faiths, while 1.8% of the population adheres to other faiths or is non-religious as of 2025.

According to the 2025 ARDA estimate, 32.8% of the population was Protestant and 22.9% was Catholic, and most Tanzanian Muslims were seen as Sunni. A Pew Research Center study conducted in 2012, showed 40% of the Muslim population of Tanzania identifies as Sunni, 20% as Shia, and 15% as Ahmadiyya, with 20% not specifying a denomination.

Religion-related statistics for Tanzania have been regarded as notoriously biased and unreliable.

About 99% of the population in Zanzibar is Muslim. The largest religion in Dar es Salaam is Islam, comprising around 70% of its total population. There are also active communities of other religious groups, primarily on the mainland, such as Buddhists, Hindus, Sikhs, and Baháʼís.

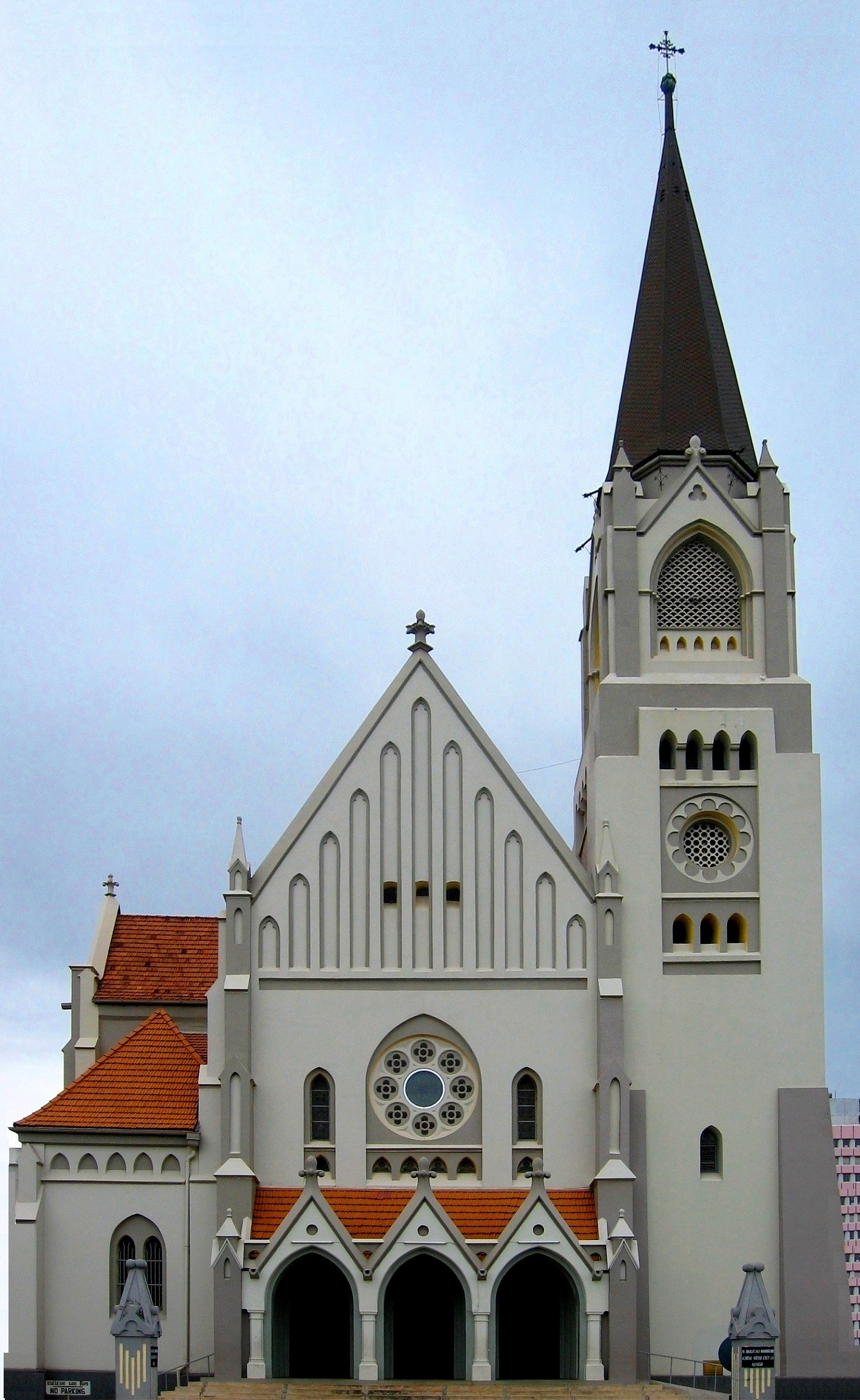
The St. Joseph's Metropolitan Cathedral in Dar es Salaam.

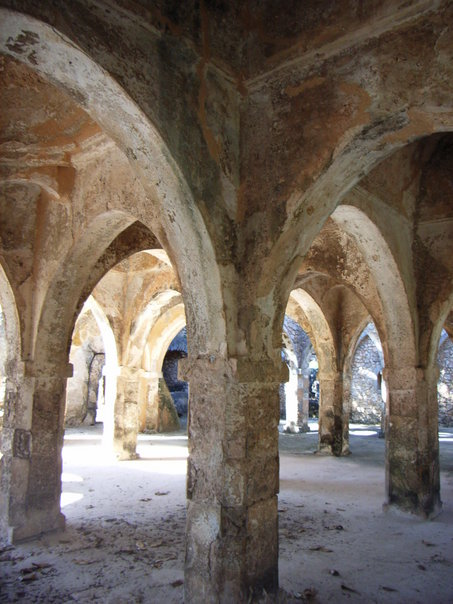
The Great Mosque of Kilwa, one of the earliest mosques in East Africa.

According to Pew Research Centre's 2010 report which surveyed 1,504 Tanzanians, the country had 62% of its general population that believed in 6 or more tenants derived from tribal, traditional African, or Animist practices.

== Abrahamic religions ==
=== Christianity ===
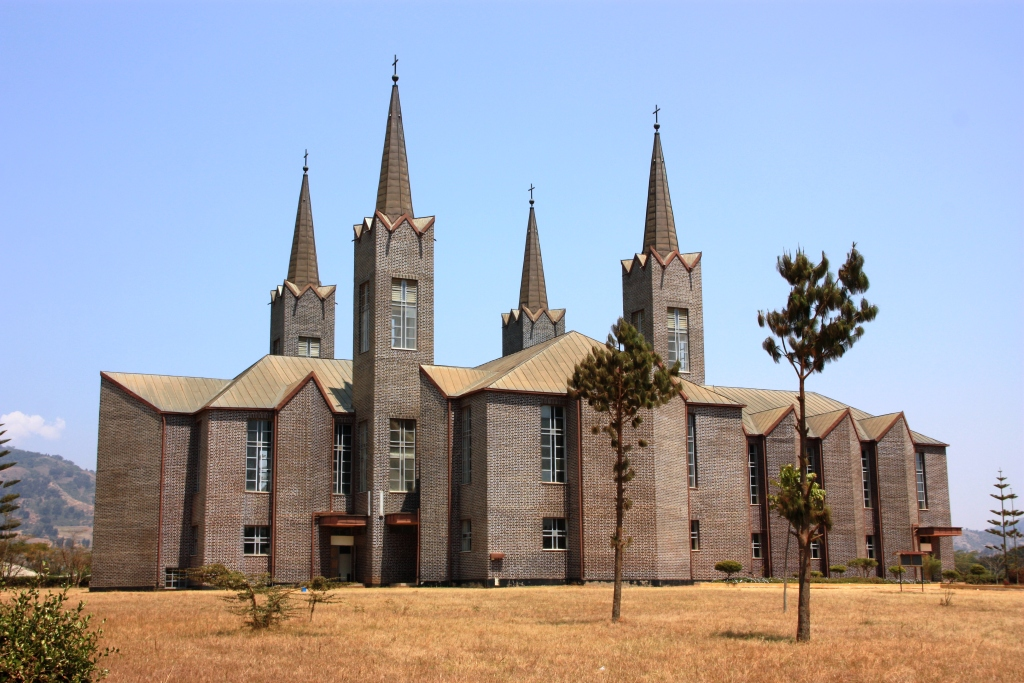
Catholic Church in Mbulu

The Christian population is largely composed of Roman Catholics and Protestants. Among the latter, the large number of Lutherans and Moravians point to the German past of the country while the number of Anglicans point to the British history of Tanganyika. All of them have had some influence in varying degrees from the Walokole movement (East African Revival), which has also been fertile ground for the spread of charismatic and Pentecostal groups.

=== Islam ===
Gaddafi Mosque

On the mainland, Muslim communities are concentrated in coastal areas, with some large Muslim majorities also in inland urban areas especially and along the former caravan routes. 30% of the country's Muslim population is Sunni; the remainder consists of several Shia subgroups (40%), mostly of Indian descent and the Ahmadiyya (15%), and a smaller subset of Ibadism and nondenominational Muslim practitioners.

== Indian religions ==
=== Hinduism ===
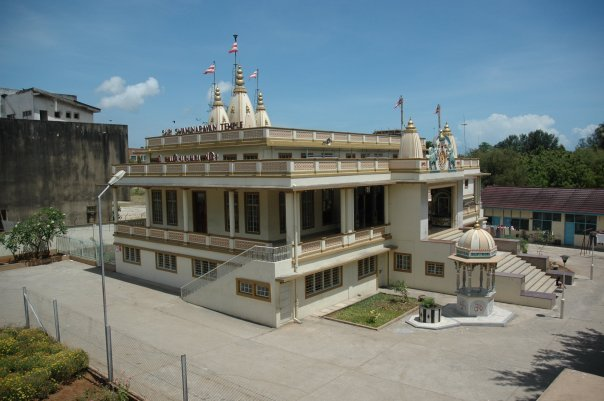
Dar-es-Salaam Swaminarayan Temple

Hinduism is a minority religion in Tanzania practiced mainly by the South Asian diaspora.

== Freedom of religion ==
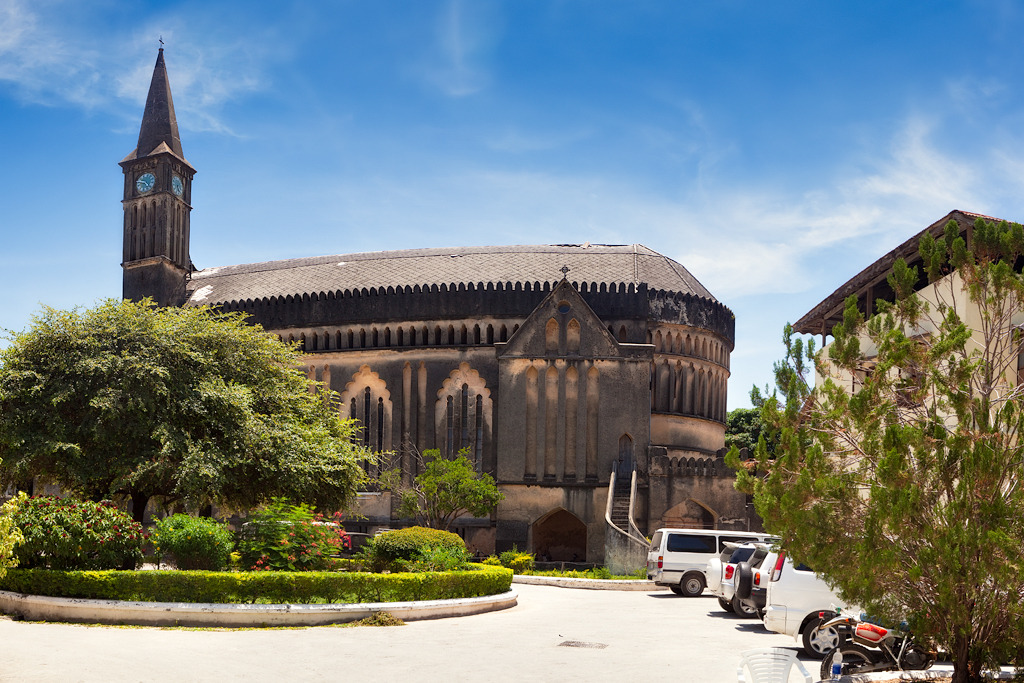
Christ Church Anglican Cathedral in Stone Town, Zanzibar.

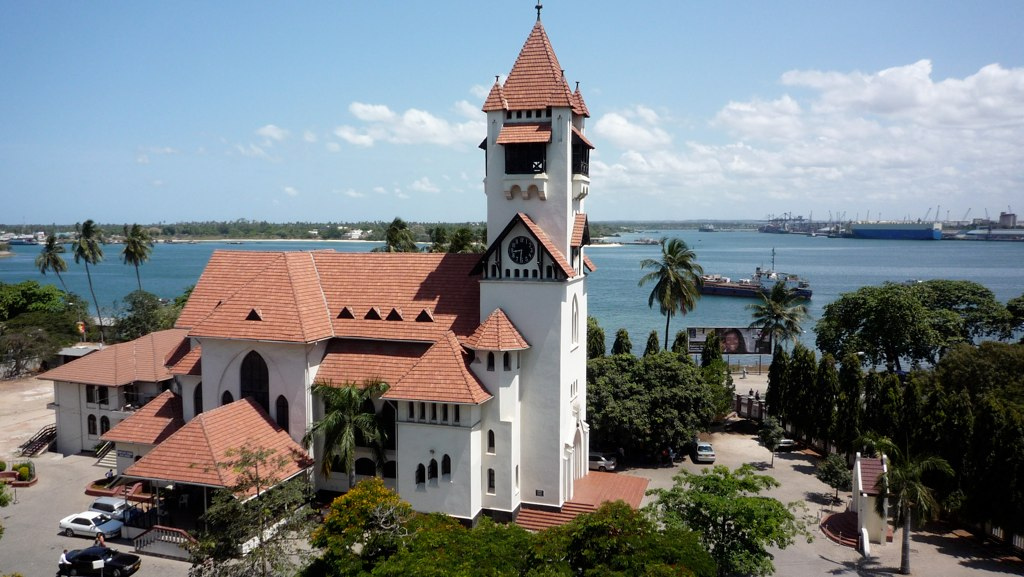
Azania Front Lutheran Church

The government of Tanzania and the semiautonomous government of Zanzibar both recognize religious freedom as a principle and make efforts to protect it. The government of Zanzibar appoints Muslim religious officials in Zanzibar. The main body of law in Tanzania and Zanzibar is secular, but Muslims have the option to use religious courts for family-related cases. Individual cases of religiously motivated violence have occurred against both Christians and Muslims, as well as those accused of witchcraft. The freedom to practice religion is a human right in Tanzania.

In 2026, Freedom House scored Tanzania 2 out of 4 for religious freedom. This represented a decline from 3 to 2, as during 2025 elections the government interfered with operations of religious organizations who supported the opposition party.

== Public holidays ==
Christian celebrations Christmas, Easter (including Good Friday and Easter Monday) and Boxing Day are recognised as public holidays. Similarly Islamic feasts Eid al-Fitr, Mawlid and Eid al-Adha are also recognised.

== Notable places of worship ==
- Azania Front Lutheran Church – Lutheran
- Christ Church, Zanzibar – Anglican
- Gaddafi Mosque – Islamic
- Great Mosque of Kilwa – Islamic (Historical)
- Ijumaa Mosque – Islamic
- Kizimkazi Mosque – Islamic
- St. Joseph's Cathedral, Dar es Salaam – Catholic

== See also ==
- Anglican Church of Tanzania
- Catholic Church in Tanzania
- Christian Council of Tanzania
- Christianity in Tanzania
- Evangelical Lutheran Church in Tanzania
- Protestants in Tanzania
- Religion in Africa
