= Christian Council =

Christian Council may refer to:

- Christian Council of Britain
- Christian Council of Ghana
- Christian Council of Korea
- Christian Council of Lesotho
- Christian Council of Mozambique
- Christian Council of Sweden
- Christian Council of Tanzania

== See also ==
- National Christian Council (disambiguation)
