= Christianity in Tanzania =

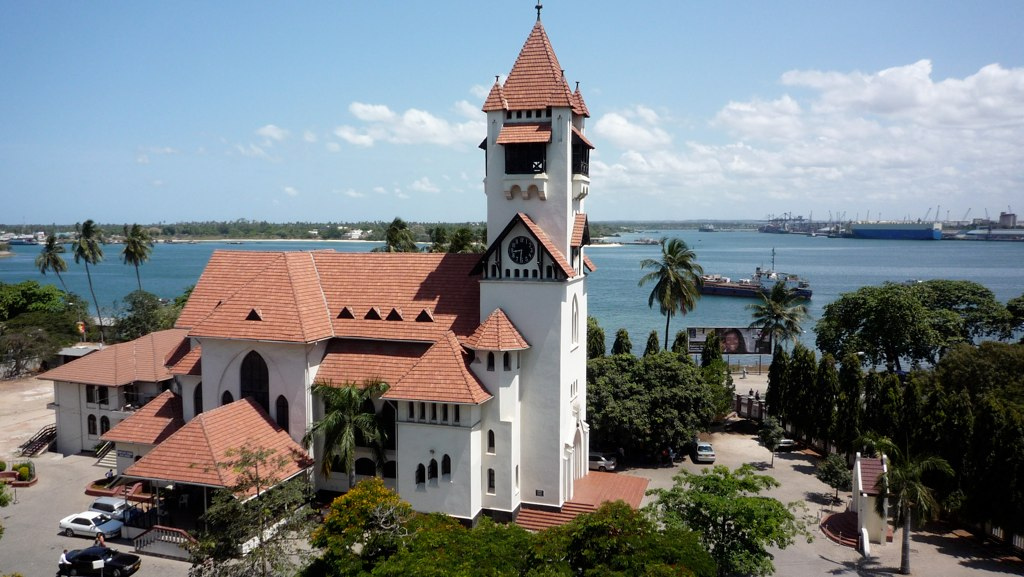
Azania Front Lutheran Church, Dar es Salaam.

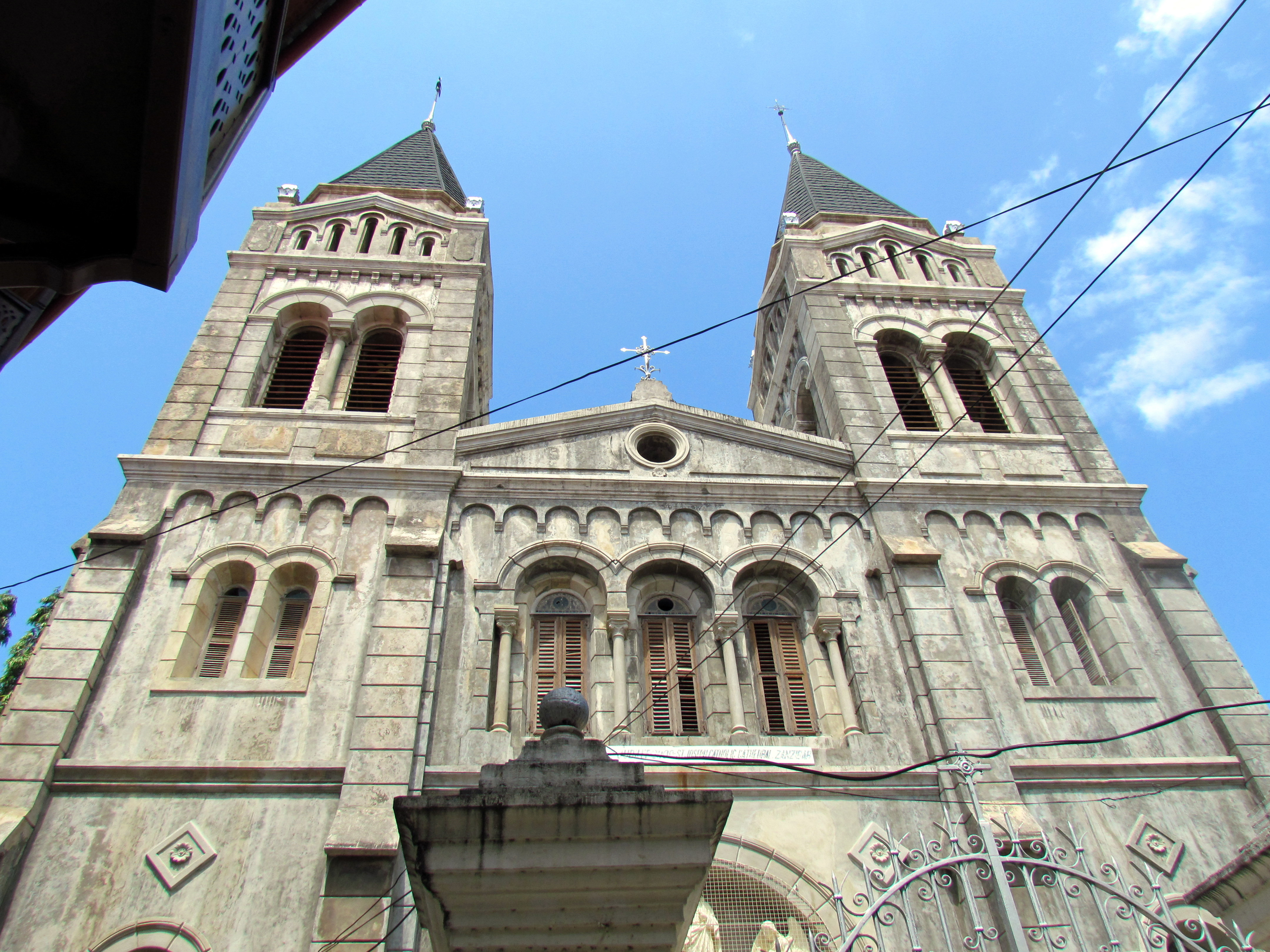
St Joseph's Catholic Cathedral, Zanzibar

Christianity is the largest religion in Tanzania, professed by around 63.1% of the total population as of 2020. Protestantism and Catholicism are the main denominations in the country.

== Historical information ==
Christianity was introduced in the early 16th century when Franciscans established a mission in Kilwa. Spiritan missionaries arrived in the area in 1868. The Anglican mission was established in 1876.

The Christian Council of Tanzania was founded in 1934.

== Statistics ==
A 2020 Pew Forum survey estimates that approximately 64.7% of the population identifies as Christian, 29.9% as Muslim, and 5.4% practitioners of other religions or none. Most Christians are Catholics and Lutherans, although there are also Anglicans, Pentecostals and other groups.

A 2010 Pew survey found 61.4 percent of respondents to be Christian, 35.2 percent to be Muslim, 1.8 percent to follow traditional African religions, 1.4 percent to be unaffiliated, and 0.1 percent to be Hindu. The Eastern Orthodox Church claims an estimated 200,000 adherents in Tanzania. The United Methodist Church claims 8,371 members in Tanzania. In 2020, the Vatican noted that 30.41% of the population are Catholic.

A 2015 study estimates some 180,000 believers in Christ from a Muslim background living in the country, most of them Protestant.

The World Factbook produced by the CIA notes that Zanzibar is almost entirely Muslim.

In 2023, Freedom House scored Tanzania at a 3 out of 4 for religious freedom.

== See also ==
- Religion in Tanzania
- Freedom of religion in Tanzania
- Evangelical Lutheran Church in Tanzania
- Anglican Church of Tanzania
- Catholic Church in Tanzania
- Protestants in Tanzania
