= List of mosques in Tanzania =

This is a list of mosques in Tanzania.

== List ==
Name	Image	Location	Year (CE)	Group	Notes
Great Mosque of Kilwa		Kilwa	11th century and after	Su	It was the largest mosque in East Africa. Built and expanded in multiple phases; the earliest extant parts are likely from the 11th century; abandoned in the 18th century; the ruins are now part of Kilwa Kisiwani, a UNESCO World Heritage Site.
Kizimkazi Mosque		Dimbani	1107		A National Historic Site; in continued use as a mosque since the 12th century.
Malindi Mosque		Stone Town, Zanzibar	c. 1835		Completed in 1250 AH (1834/1835 CE) with an unusual conical minaret
Ijumaa Mosque		Stone Town, Zanzibar	before 1994		
Gaddafi Mosque		Dodoma	2010	Su	The largest mosque in the country, with capacity for 3,000 worshipers; funded by Muammar Gaddafi.
Mohammed VI Mosque		Dar es Salaam	2022	Su	Funded by Mohammed VI of Morocco

== See also ==
- Islam in Tanzania
- List of mosques in Africa
