= Public holidays in Zambia =

There are approximately thirteen nationally recognized public holidays celebrated in the Republic of Zambia, a country in Southern Africa.

If a public holiday falls on a Sunday, the following Monday will be observed as a holiday.

On the Easter weekend, all four days are declared public holidays.

== Public holidays ==
- January 1 - New Year's Day
- March 8 - International Women's Day
- March 12 - Youth Day
- April 28 - Kenneth Kaunda's Birthday
- May 1 - Labour Day
- May 25 - African Freedom Day
- First Monday in July - Heroes' Day
- Tuesday after Heroes' Day - Unity Day
- First Monday in August - Farmers' Day
- October 24 - Independence Day
- December 25 - Christmas Day
- December 29 - National Day of Prayer and Christian Heritage
