= Old Boma, Dar es Salaam =

Historical building in Dar es Salaam, Tanzania

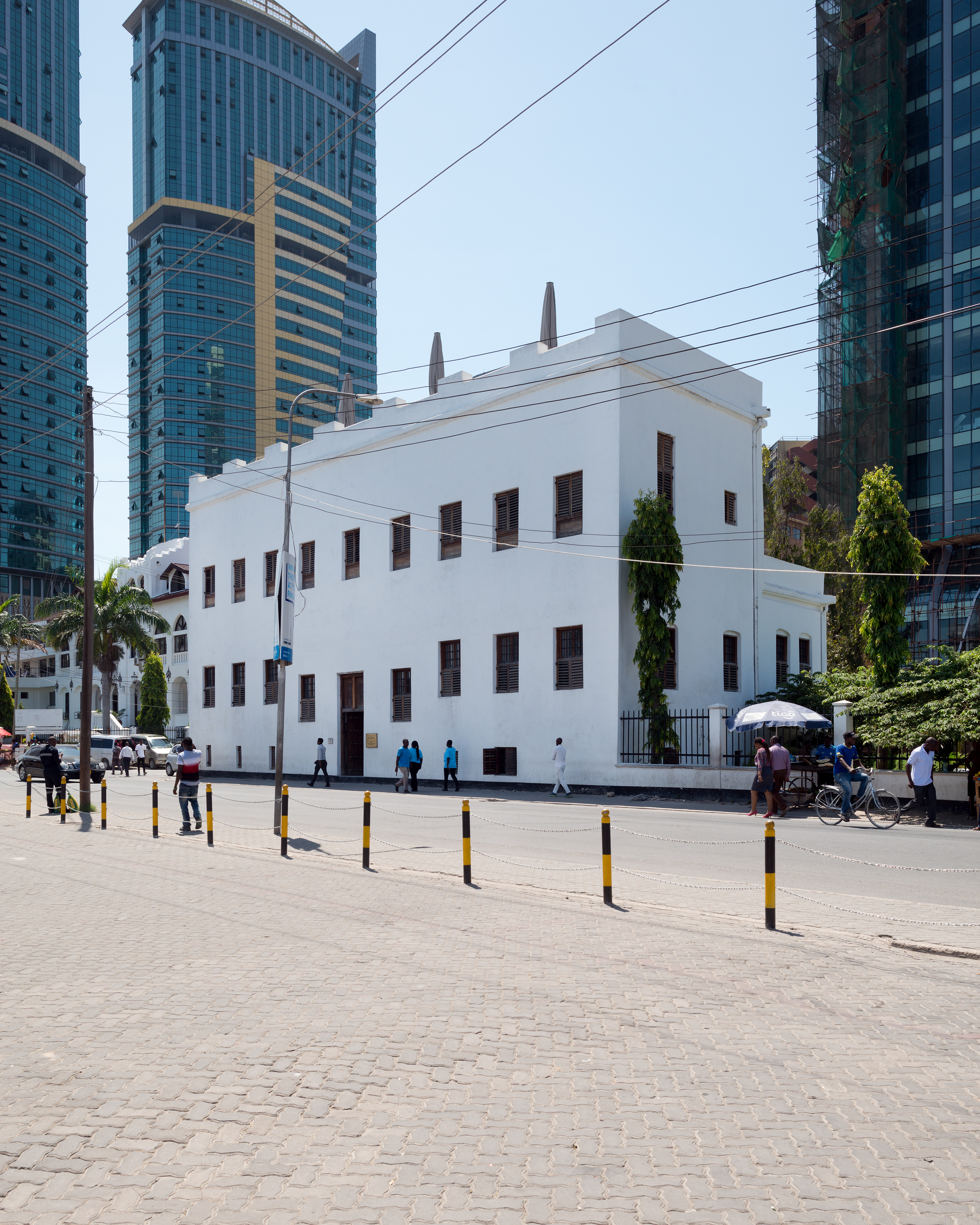

The Old Boma of Dar es Salaam, Tanzania is one of the city's oldest buildings. It is located at the crossing of Morogoro Road and Sokoine Drive, facing the harbor and adjacent to the City Hall. It was built in 1866-67 by Majid bin Said, sultan of Zanzibar, close to his palace (now demolished). He also commissioned other buildings in the same area, such as the White Fathers' House. Under German colonial rule it was restored and enlarged. Distinctive features of the building include the zanzibari-style carved wooden door and coral stone walls.

The Boma now houses the Dar es Salaam Centre for Architectural Heritage (DARCH). DARCH displays a permanent exhibition on the architectural heritage and evolution of Dar es Salaam. It also provides specific tourist information related to architecture and built heritage, and is a venue for temporary exhibitions on art, photography and architecture.
