= Great Mosque of Kilwa =

Former mosque in Kilwa, Lindi, Tanzania

- Msikiti Mkuu wa Kilwa
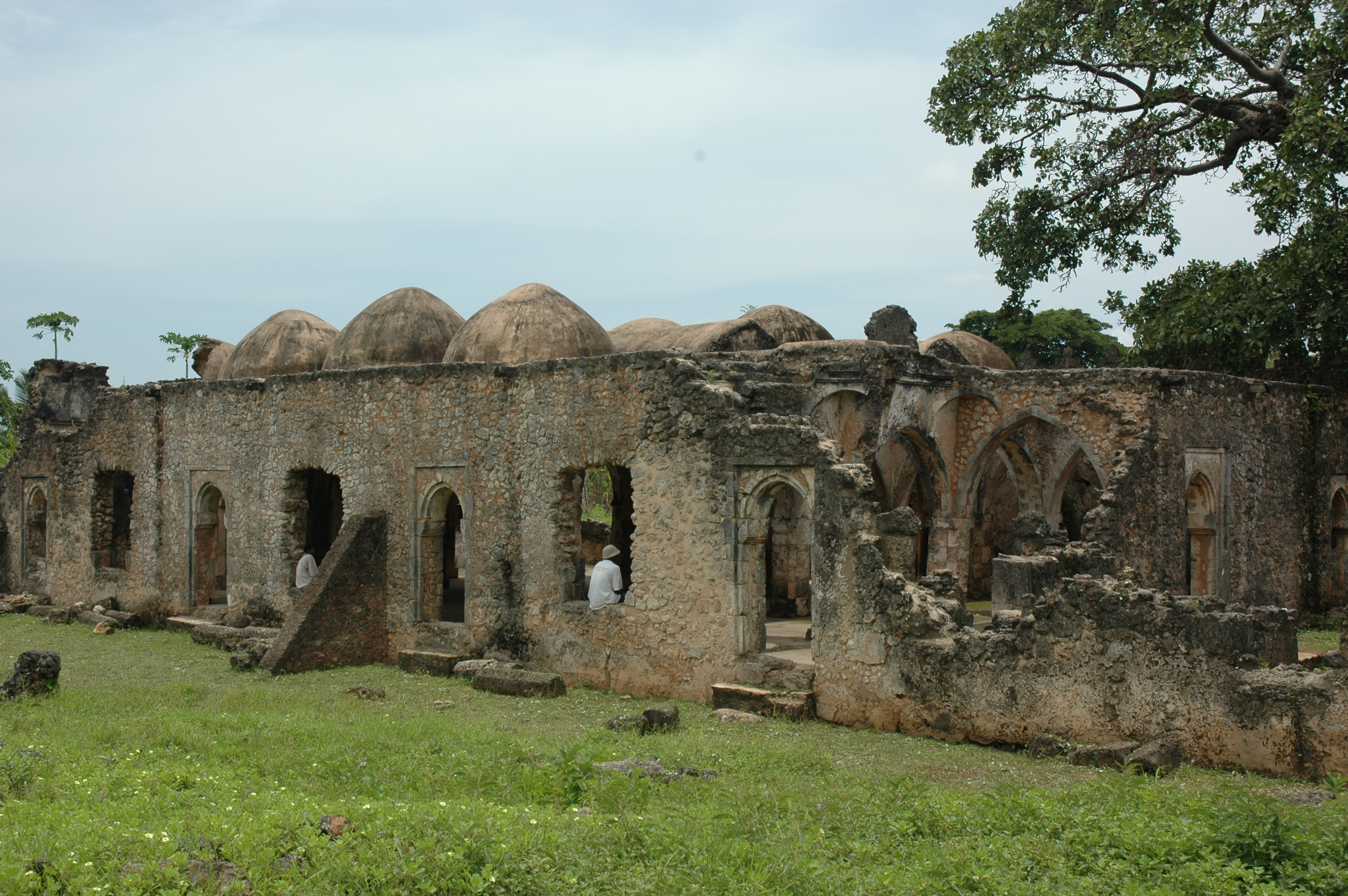
- Ruins of the former mosque

- Location of the former mosque in Tanzania

Religion
- Affiliation: Sunni Islam (former)
- Ecclesiastical or organizational status: Friday mosque (10th century–18th century)
- Status: Abandoned (partial ruinous state)

Location
- Location: Kilwa Masoko, Kilwa District, Lindi Region
- Country: Tanzania
- Interactive map of Great Mosque of Kilwa
- Coordinates: 8°58′0″S 39°32′0″E

Architecture
- Type: Mosque
- Style: Swahili
- Completed: c. 10th century CE (origins); 12th-13th centuries CE (extensions); 18th century (renovations)
- Destroyed: 1331 (earthquake; partial destruction)

Specifications
- Dome: many
- Minaret: 1 (No longer extant)
- Materials: Coral; timber; stone; lime plaster
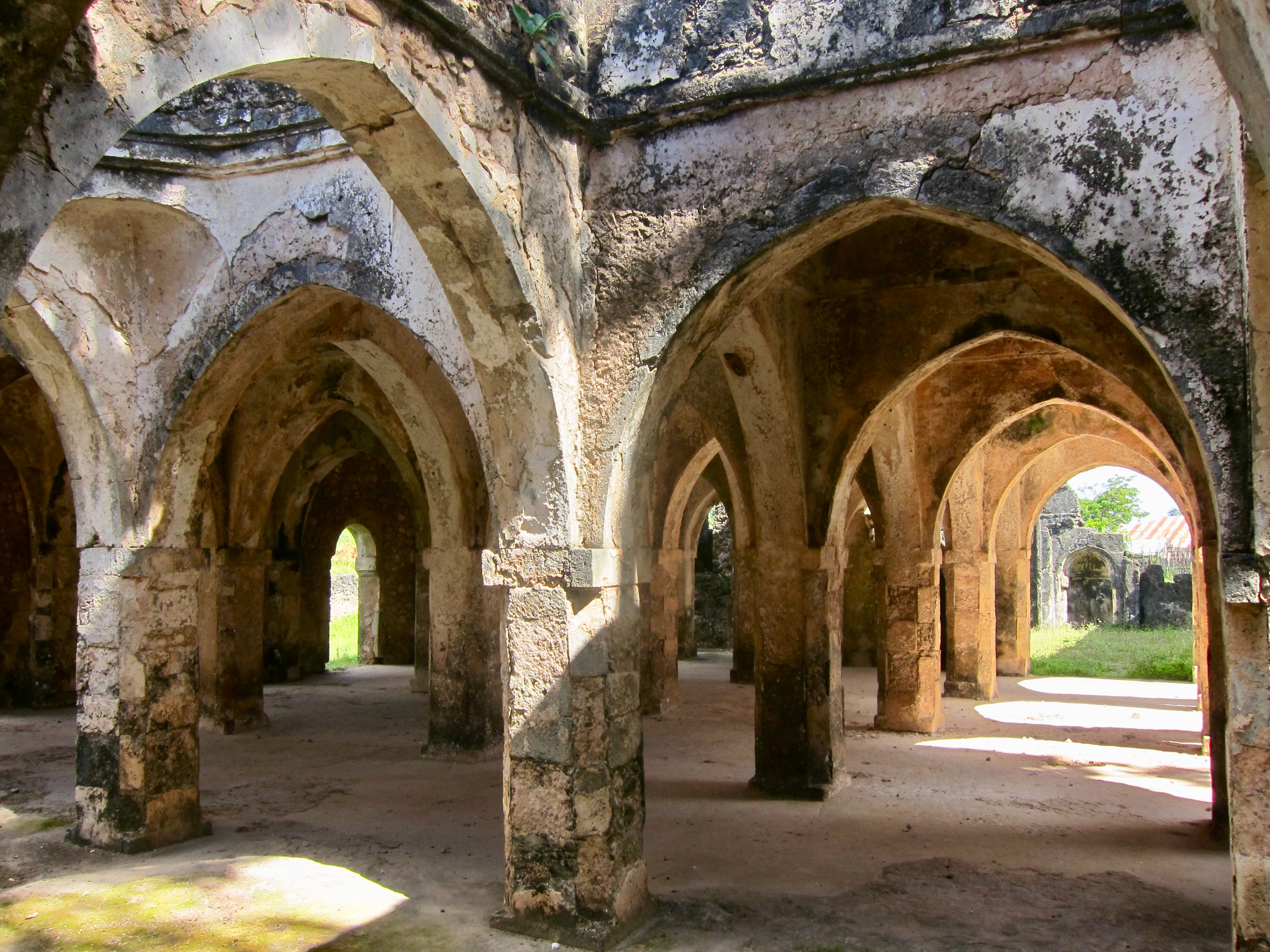
- The prayer room inside the mosque extension, at Kilwa Kisiwani

UNESCO World Heritage Site
- Type: Cultural
- Criteria: iii
- Designated: 1981 (5th session)
- Part of: Ruins of Kilwa Kisiwani and Ruins of Songo Mnara
- Reference no.: 144
- UNESCO Region: Africa
- Endangered: 2004–2014

National Historic Sites of Tanzania
- Type: Cultural
- Part of: Kilwa Kisiwani Ruins

The Great Mosque of Kilwa (Swahili: Msikiti Mkuu wa Kilwa) is a former Friday mosque in a partial ruinous state, located on the island of Kilwa Kisiwani, in Kilwa Masoko in Kilwa District in Lindi Region of Tanzania. It was likely founded in the tenth century, but the two major stages of construction date to the eleventh or twelfth and thirteenth century, respectively. It is one of the earliest partially surviving mosques on the Swahili coast and is one of the first mosques built without a sahn.

The smaller northern prayer hall dates to the first phase of construction and was built in the 11th or 12th century. It contained a total of 16 bays, supported by nine pillars, originally carved from coral but later replaced by timber. The structure, which was entirely roofed, was modified in the 13th century adding side pilasters, timber, transverse beams.

In the early fourteenth century, Sultan al-Hasan ibn Sulaiman, who also built the nearby Palace of Husuni Kubwa, added a southern extension which included a great dome. This dome was described by Ibn Battuta after he visited the Kilwa Sultanate in 1331. Ibn Battuta's descriptions were not entirely accurate though, claiming that the mosque was completely made of wood, while stone walls were found to predate the fourteenth century.

The ruins of the former mosque, abandoned during the 18th century, are located with Kilwa Kisiwani, a UNESCO World Heritage Site and a National Historic Site of Tanzania.

== Architecture ==
Residing on the coast of East Africa, the Great Mosque was one of the many structures in Kilwa that was built in a fairly common fashion of its time. Like its name suggests it was remarkably larger than the other mosques being built on the island. The walls of the mosque were built and developed of generally squared and coursed coral stone. Often, the courses in between would have chips built in to level them out. These types of walls were barely made below the ground and were made with mud mortar. Columns also made of coral stone helped to support the high vaulted ceiling. The floors were slowly made of lime plaster, and later, the walls were made of lime mortar. There was also a separate domed chamber used for private worship by the Sultan. However, due to decline in wealth in Kilwa in the late 14th century, it led to less construction of buildings and building maintenance because the demand for lime and building stone lessened. Because of Kilwa's decline, the Great Mosque was reported to be in ruins. The mosque collapsed during the rule of Abu'l Mawahib al-Hasan bin Sulaiman.

The mosque is placed at the top of a small hill bridging to the qibla, making the mosque larger in width than it is length. The oblique arches in the interior support the structure of the ceiling. Later, another set of these arcades were built to reinforce them. The external edicule of a mihrab built in the walls is topped by an arch. The outside veneer of the qibla divider is strengthened by a 30-centimetre-wide (12 in) brace that finishes the establishment. This mihrab has a broken arch that resides on top of two columns with rectangular capitals.

The northern part of the Great Mosque is the oldest portion of the mosque, and was built between 1131 and 1170. All that remains of the northern part are walls whose establishments are made out of a genuinely standard mechanical assembly, quadrangular rubble in coral limestone. Today, the nine monochrome polygonal segments that hold up the leveled roof are still visible.

=== Renovations ===
As time progressed, Kilwa had a growing trading economy and wealth flourished. Because of this growth in the economy, it led to a new extension built to the Great Mosque. During this time of prosperity, the Great Mosque was rebuilt and renovated many times leading to a majority of the structure being new at the time.

Between 1294 and 1302, the Great Mosque was extended southward as support for a semicircular vault in which the sultan went to do his prayer. This southern extension of the mosque was traditionally built, having square bays divided by a space in between, leaving no central court. The southern wall of the mosque still has rectangular columns from this time.

In the fourteenth century, traces of the octagonal pillars were thought to have been built from previous traditional columns. However, these columns seemed to have been made from a single type of stone.

In 1331, an earthquake struck and led to the collapse and destruction of the mosque. Despite the destruction that it caused, the arched roof remained protected in the east built with Claveaux. On the south-east part of the mosque, there is a large dome that may have served as the mausoleum of Sultan al-Hasan ibn Sulaiman, and it is the only dome that remained standing after the earthquake.

In the late eighteenth century, the southern wall of the extension was used to create a new mihrab by knocking through the wall, leading to the roof falling through and being left as ruin. This new renovation was a way in which Kilwa could revive their status and consider themselves a sultanate and a town. However, the northern part of the mosque was decommissioned and never rebuilt in the eighteenth century, and in the nineteenth and twentieth centuries, their status degraded to village, as the mosque is now seen as a historic site.

== History ==
While there were many buildings and structures made of stone such as the Great Mosque, discoveries of coins were first made. Each coin was under the name of 'Ali bin al-Hasan. Because all of the coins were under the same name, it is the most convincing confirmation that there is in order to identify the earliest form of a first ruler in Kilwa. Pots of these coins were also found inside of the walls of the mosque. This serves as proof that masonry was a form of commitment before these coins were common.

Early inscriptions were also found with early dates attached to them in which one of the dates marked the year 1269 the start of construction of the minaret of the Great Mosque.

These coins that were found under 'Ali bin al-Hasan were found on the higher two levels of the mosque, suggesting that the mosque may have been built long before this sultan. However, the initial rectangular shape of the mosque was said to have been built between 1131 and 1170.

=== 3D documentation ===
Between 2005 and 2009, the Zamani Project documented some of the Swahili ruins on Kilwa Kisiwani with terrestrial 3D laser scanning. The structures documented include the Gereza (prison), the Great Mosque, the Husuni Kubwa, the Makutani Building, and the Malindi Mosque.

== See also ==
- Islam in Tanzania
- List of mosques in Tanzania
- List of protected areas of Tanzania
