= Fellowship of Christian Councils in Southern Africa =

The Fellowship of Christian Councils in Southern Africa (FOCCISA) is an international ecumenical organization. Founded in 1980 as the Fellowship of Christian Councils in East and Southern Africa, it changed to its current name in 1999.

It is a member of the World Council of Churches.

The organization hosts a Health and Gender Justice Network and Economic Justice Network.

The organization regularly speaks out against corruption and violence.

== Membership ==
FOCCISA members include:

- Botswana Council of Churches
- Christian Council of Lesotho
- Christian Council of Mozambique
- Christian Council of Tanzania
- Council of Christian Churches in Angola
- Council of Churches in Namibia
- Council of Churches in Zambia
- Council of Swaziland Churches
- Malawi Council of Churches
- Council of Christian Churches in Madagascar
- South African Council of Churches
- Zimbabwe Council of Churches
