= Protestantism in Tanzania =

A 2020 Pew Forum survey estimates that approximately 63% of the population of Tanzania identifies as Christian, 34% as Muslim, and 5% practitioners of other religions. Most Christians are Catholics and Lutherans, although there are also Anglicans, Pentecostals and other groups.

According to a 2015 study, 27.7% of the population of Tanzania (15 million people) is Protestant. A similar percentage is Catholic, while other Christian groups, including Orthodox, make up nearly 3% of the population.

The earliest Protestant denomination in the country is the Moravian Church in Western Tanzania which began when German missionaries arrived in Tanganyika in 1897. In 2023, there are 120,000 Moravians in West Tanzania alone and almost half a million throughout the country, meaning that more than half of all Moravians in the world live in Tanzania.

The main Protestant denominations are the Lutheran Church, the Anglican Church of Tanzania and the Evangelical Lutheran Church in Tanzania.

Other denominations in Tanzania include;

- African independent and instituted churches (AICs)
- Baptist Convention of Tanzania (BCT)
- Christian Reformed Church in Eastern Africa
- Jehovah’s Witnesses
- Methodists
- Mennonite Church in Tanzania
- Mormons
- Presbyterians
- Quakers
- Salvation Army
- Seventh-day Adventists

In 2023, Tanzania scored 3 out of 4 for religious freedom.

== See also ==
- Religion in Tanzania
- Freedom of religion in Tanzania
- Christianity in Tanzania
- Evangelical Lutheran Church in Tanzania
- Anglican Church of Tanzania
- Catholic Church in Tanzania
