= Kinondoni, Kinondoni District =

Ward of Kinondoni District, Dar es Salaam Region

Kinondoni Kata ya Kinondoni (Swahili)
- Ward of Kinondoni District
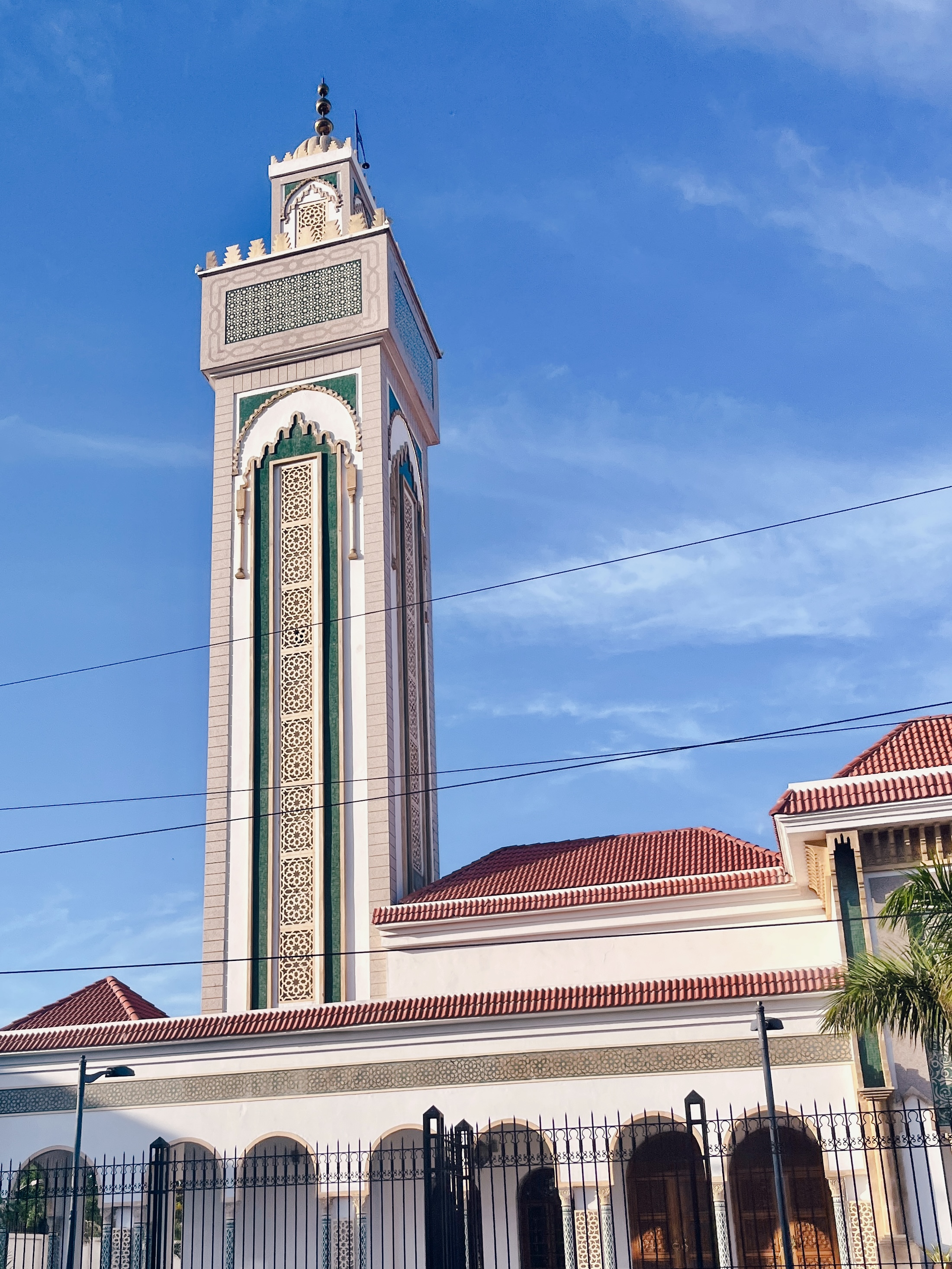
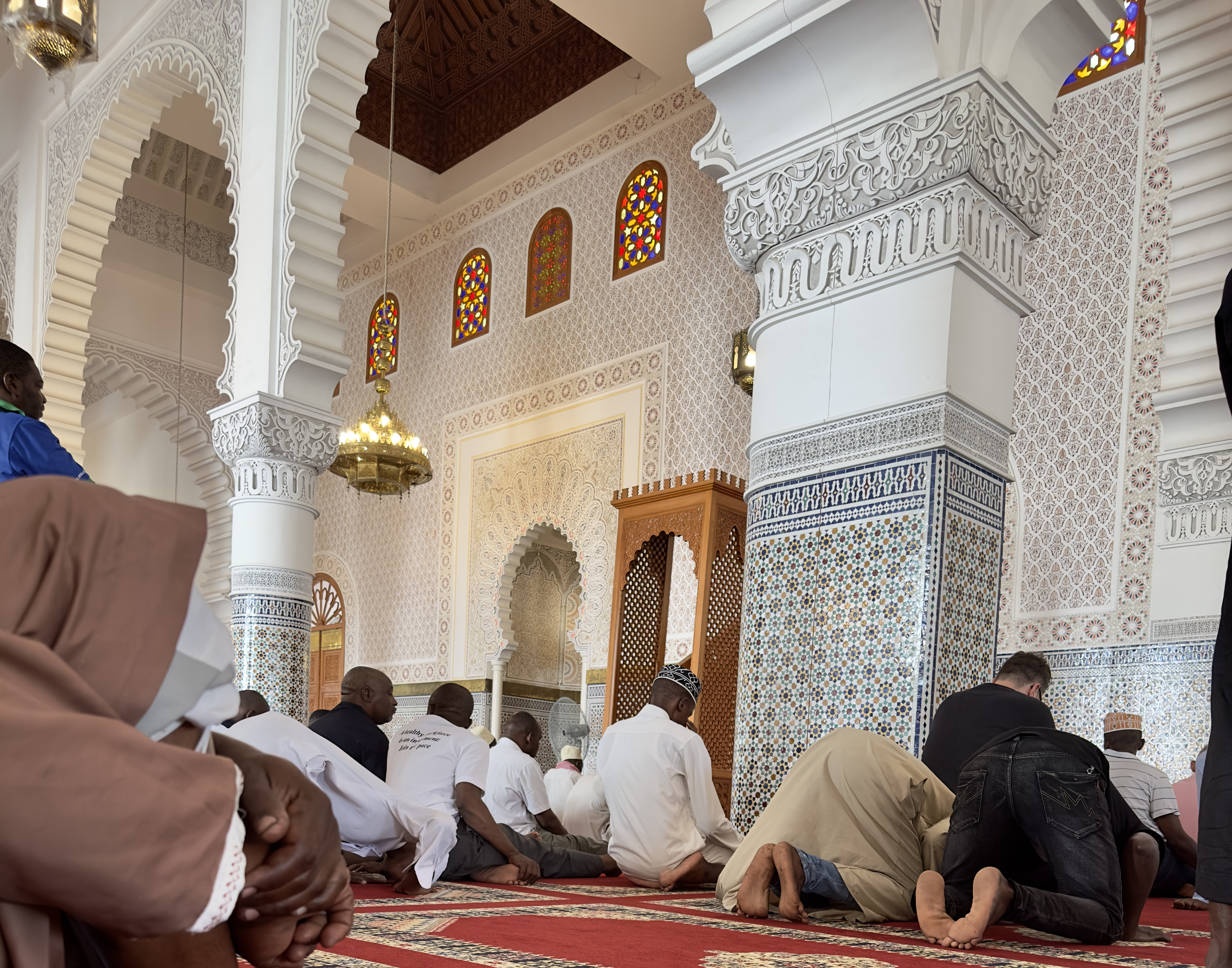
- From top to bottom: Kinondoni Masjid BAKWATA, interior of Kinondoni Mosque & Fayat tower in Kinondoni ward

- Location within Tanzania
- Coordinates: 6°46′59.88″S 39°16′4.08″E
- Country: Tanzania
- Region: Dar es Salaam Region
- District: Kinondoni District

Area
  - Total: 1.8 km^{2} (0.69 sq mi)

Population (2016)
  - Total: 21,239
- Demonym: Kinondoni

Ethnic groups
  - Settler: Swahili
  - Ancestral: Zaramo
- Tanzanian Postal Code: 14110

Kinondoni (Kata ya Kinondoni in Swahili) is an administrative ward in the Kinondoni District of the Dar es Salaam Region in Tanzania. The ward is bordered to the east by Mikocheni and Mwananyamala wards, to the west by Hananasif ward, and to the north by Msasani ward. The ward is home to the headquarters for the National Muslim Council of Tanzania (BAKWATA) with its grand Mosque. The ward is also the headquarters of Tanzania's second-largest political party, Chadema. According to the 2012 census, the ward has a total population of 21,239.

== Administration ==
The postal code for Kindondoni ward is 14110. The ward is divided into the following neighborhoods (Mitaa):

- Ada Estate
- Kinondoni Mjini
- Kinondoni Shamba
- Kumbukumbu

=== Government ===
The ward, like every other ward in the country, has local government offices based on the population served.The Kinondoni Ward administration building houses a court as per the Ward Tribunal Act of 1988, including other vital departments for the administration the ward. The ward has the following administration offices:

- Kinondoni Ward Police Station
- Kinondoni Ward Government Office (Afisa Mtendaji, Kata ya Ndugumbi)
- Kinondoni Ward Tribunal (Baraza La Kata) is a Department inside Ward Government Office

In the local government system of Tanzania, the ward is the smallest democratic unit. Each ward is composed of a committee of eight elected council members which include a chairperson, one salaried officer (with no voting rights), and an executive officer. One-third of seats are reserved for women councillors.

== Economy ==
Numerous corporate and government headquarters are located in Kinondoni. The ward contains the national offices of the South African bank Stanbic and the Indian telecom provider Airtel. The national office of the World Food Programme is also located here, as are the Tanzania Heart Institute, Nordic Hospital, and Agarwal's Eye Hospital. Additionally, there is the French consulate, Manyanya Food Market, and Jangid Plaza mall.

== Demographics ==
Like much of the district, the ward is the ancestral home of the Zaramo people. Over time, the population of the area became more cosmopolitan.

== Education and health ==
=== Education ===
The ward is home to these educational institutions:

- Kumbukumbu Primary School
- Sunray Primary School
- Kinondoni Secondary School
- Kinondoni Muslim Secondary School
- Dar es Salaam International Academy
- Open University Tanzania, Kinondoni

=== Healthcare ===
The ward is home to the following health institutions:

- Saifee Hospital
- Dr. Agarwal's Eye Hospital
- Tanzania Heart Institute
