= Gaddafi Mosque =

Mosque in Dodoma, Tanzania

- مسجد القذافي; Msikiti wa Gaddafi
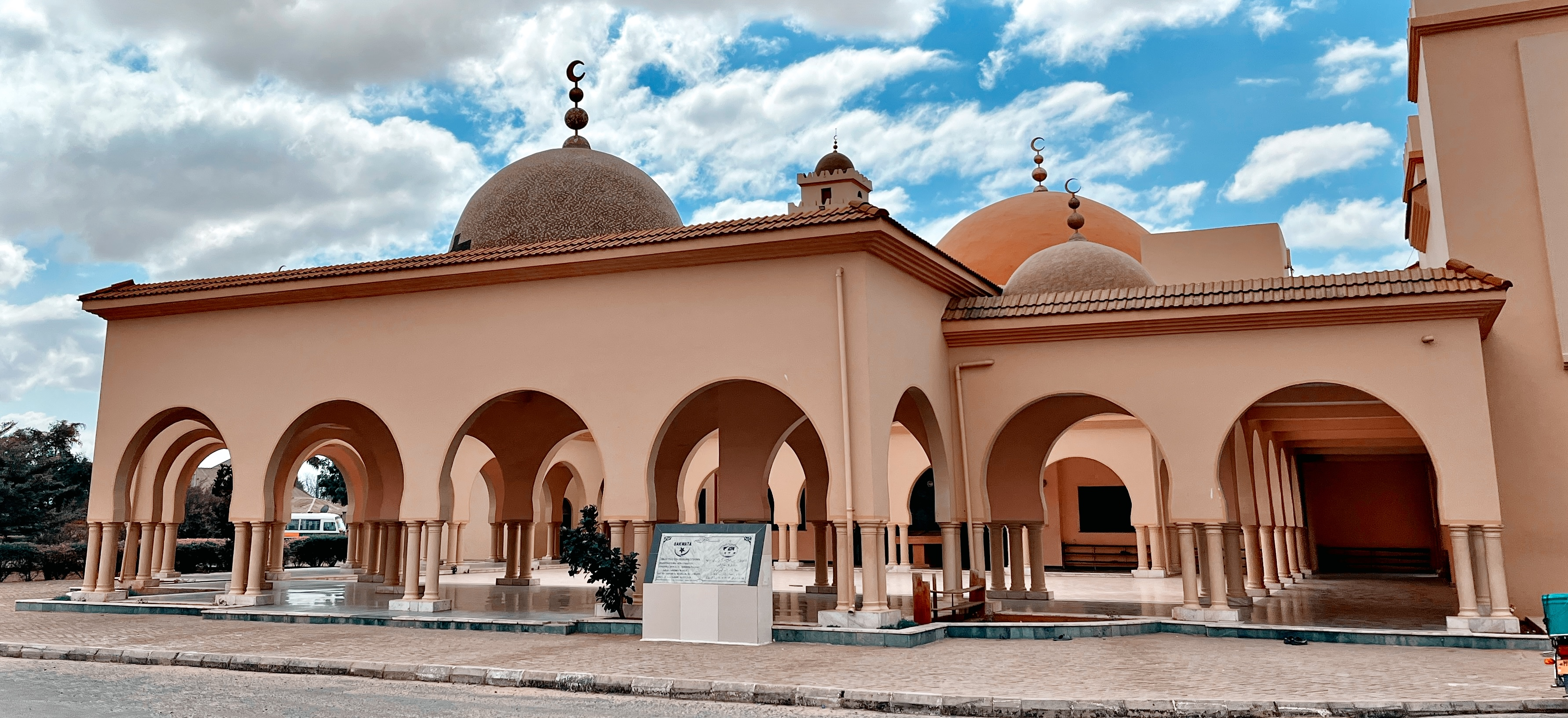

- Location within Tanzania

Religion
- Affiliation: Sunni Islam
- Ecclesiastical or organizational status: Mosque
- Status: Active

Location
- Location: Dodoma
- Country: Tanzania
- Interactive map of Gaddafi Mosque
- Administration: BAKWATA
- Coordinates: 6°10′22″S 35°44′45″E

Architecture
- Type: Mosque
- Funded by: Muammar Gaddafi
- Completed: 2010
- Construction cost: US$5 million

Specifications
- Capacity: 3,000 worshipers
- Dome: 2
- Minaret: 1

The Gaddafi Mosque (Arabic: مسجد القذافي; Swahili: Msikiti wa Gaddafi) is a mosque located in Dodoma, the capital of Tanzania. With capacity for 3,000 worshipers, it is the largest mosque in the country, and the second-largest in East Africa after the Uganda National Mosque.

== Overview ==
The pink structure was named after the former Libyan Brotherly Leader and Guide of the Revolution Muammar Gaddafi who provided the funds for its construction via the World Islamic Call Society. The mosque was inaugurated by President Jakaya Kikwete in 2010 and can accommodate at least 3,000 worshippers.

== Gallery ==
The mosque in 2012

== See also ==
- Islam in Tanzania
- List of mosques in Tanzania
