= Dar Centre for Architectural Heritage =

Architectural heritage centre in Tanzania

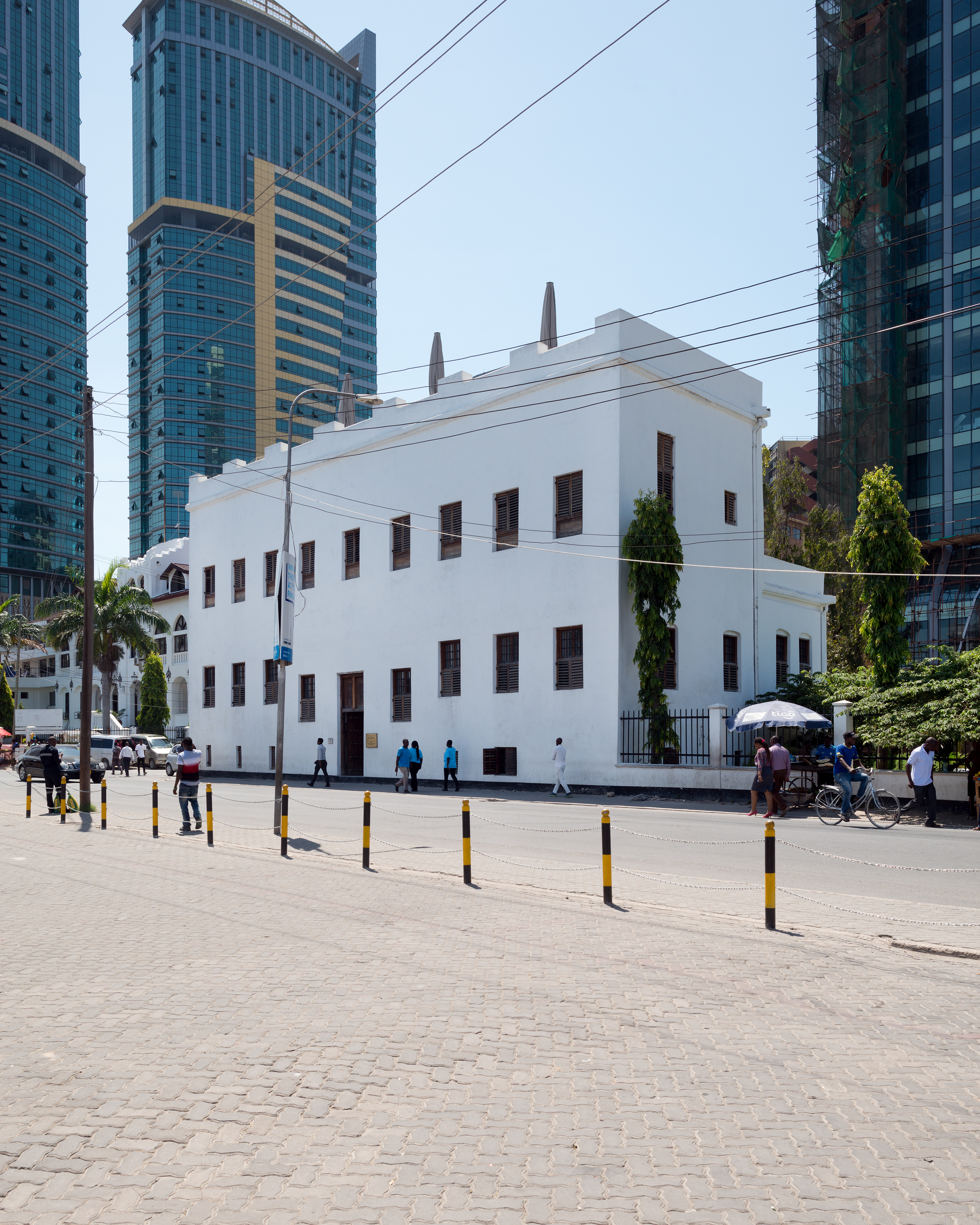
DARCH is located in the Old Boma Building in Kisutu Ward.

Dar Centre for Architectural Heritage (DARCH!) is a think tank and exhibition space focused on architecture, planning and design in Dar es Salaam, Tanzania. It is located in Kisutu Ward on Sokoine Drive, inside the historic Old Boma building, being the oldest remaining building in Dar es Salaam

== Background and history ==
DARCH! was founded in 2014 as a joint initiative of the Habitat Unit (TU Berlin), the Architects Association of Tanzania (AAT) and the Faculty of Architecture at Ardhi University in Dar Salaam.

== Context ==
The progressive destruction of Dar es Salaams historic and locally adapted building fabric is due not least to the misunderstanding that "heritage preservation" is at odds with economic and social progress. DARCH! therefore demonstrates strategies and approaches for the maintenance and development of built history in an integrative model. Rather than the mere preservation of historic facades, a holistic understanding of architectural history as a living and evolving cultural asset and potential driver of economic, social, cultural and political innovation forms the underlying principle of DARCH!.

DARCH! operates on three levels:

- It acts as a think tank for research projects and documentation, planning and design.
- It offers various cultural programs and trainings for pupils and students with the aim of supporting both North-South and South-South exchange and cooperation.
- It organizes events for the general public.

== Permanent exhibition ==
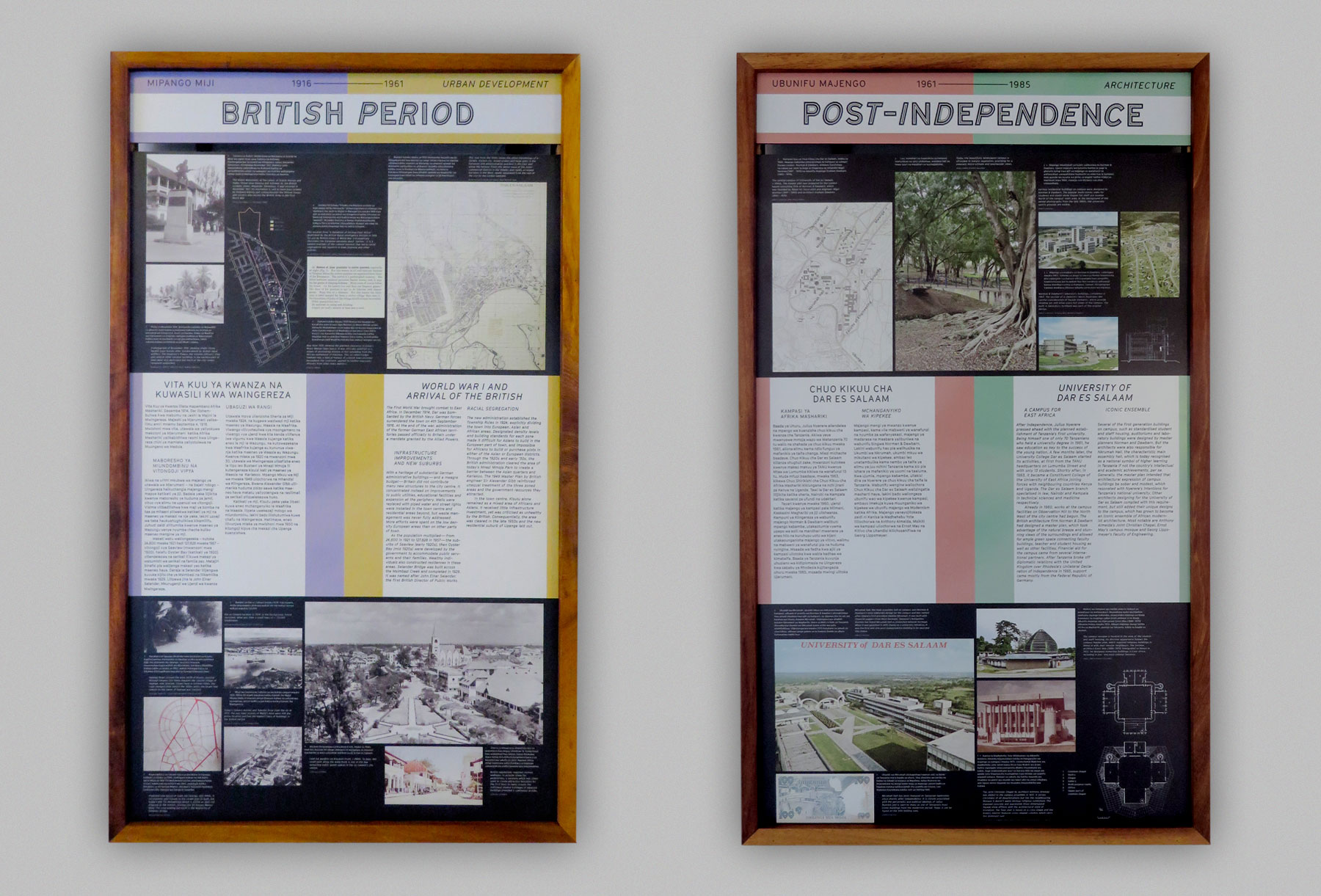
Exhibition Panels on Architectural History of Dar es Salaam

The permanent exhibition in the Old Boma is an integral part of the Dar Center for Architectural Heritage. It documents and promotes Dar es Salaam's urban history and is aimed at both residents and tourists. A particular focus is on the period from the country's independence to the present day - an era that is not yet recognized as a genuine part of the city's history.

An exhibition catalog documents the content of the exhibition itself as well as papers and essays written by the project partners.

== Temporary exhibitions ==
Temporary Exhibitions by local and international artists, architects and activists are shown regularly at DARCH!. These often deal with critical topics such as decolonization of urbanism.

== Public acclaim ==
A medal of honor was awarded to Annika Seifert, the initiator of DARCH!, by the East African Institute of Architects for "Special achievements in research and promotion of architectural heritage in East Africa" in 2014. It was handed over by the then Minister of Public Works (to become president of TZ) Hon. John Magufuli at Mlimani City Convention Centre in Dar es Salaam.
