= Zimbabwe Council of Churches =

Christian organization in Zimbabwe founded in 1964

The Zimbabwe Council of Churches is an ecumenical Christian organization in Zimbabwe. It was founded in 1964 and is a member of the World Council of Churches and the Fellowship of Christian Councils in Southern Africa.

This ecumenical fellowship has 32 member churches as well as ecumenical and associate partners [though they sit as observers]
