= National Day of Prayer, Fasting, Repentance and Reconciliation (Zambia) =

Annual observance in Zambia

National Day of Prayer
- Official name: National Day of Prayer, Fasting, Repentance and Reconciliation
- Observed by: Zambia
- Date: 29 December
- Frequency: Annual
- Started by: Edgar Chagwa Lungu
- Related to: Day of Prayer

The National Day of Prayer, Fasting, Repentance and Reconciliation was an annual public holiday in Zambia that was observed on 18 October. It was declared by President Edgar Lungu in 2015 and became an annual public holiday from 2015 to 2025. The day was dedicated to prayer, fasting, repentance and reconciliation.

== History ==
The National Day of Prayer, Fasting, Repentance and Reconciliation was established in 2015 during the presidency of Edgar Lungu. During the ceremonial opening of the National Assembly on 18 September 2015, Lungu announced that he had proclaimed 18 October 2015 as a national day of prayer and fasting. He called on Zambians to seek God's guidance for the country and described the day as an opportunity for reconciliation, forgiveness and prayer. He said the decision followed requests from citizens and clergy and came at a time when Zambia was facing social and economic challenges.

The first national observance was held on 18 October 2015 at the Lusaka Showgrounds. Lungu attended the event, which brought together government officials, religious leaders and members of the public. The observance focused on prayer, fasting, repentance, forgiveness and reconciliation.

The government subsequently made the observance an annual public holiday. Statutory Instrument No. 78 of 2015, issued under the Public Holidays Act, declared 18 October of every year, beginning in 2016, a public holiday for national prayer, fasting, repentance and reconciliation. The instrument was signed by Lungu on 22 October 2015 and published in the Government Gazette on 23 October 2015.

The National Day was presented by the government as part of Zambia's Christian identity. The government later linked the observance to Zambia's declaration as a Christian nation in 1991 under President Frederick Chiluba, which was subsequently reflected in the preamble to the Constitution of Zambia.

=== Lungu presidency ===
The first observance as an annual public holiday took place on 18 October 2016. Thousands of people gathered at the Woodlands Forest Reserve in Lusaka. The theme was "Promoting Reconciliation and Healing, Celebrating Unity in Diversity". Lungu used the occasion to reaffirm Zambia's status as a Christian nation and to call for national unity. During the event, he also led a groundbreaking ceremony for the proposed 10,000-seat National House of Prayer. Former presidents Kenneth Kaunda and Rupiah Banda also attended the event.

The 2017 observance was held nationally, with the main prayers at Nkana Stadium in Kitwe. The theme was "Repentance, Promoting Peace and Reconciliation – Consolidating National Unity in Diversity". The Ministry of National Guidance and Religious Affairs coordinated the event with the National House of Prayer and churches. The government encouraged people in provinces and districts, as well as Zambian diplomatic missions abroad, to observe the day. The ministry said the day was intended to encourage prayer, repentance, forgiveness and reconciliation and to promote national unity.

In 2018, the government-sponsored event was described as the fourth National Day of Prayer and Fasting. It was held under the theme "Facing the Future as a Reconciled, United, and Prosperous Nation under God's Guidance". The event was coordinated by the Ministry of National Guidance and Religious Affairs. Some political leaders and their supporters did not participate in the observance, with Lungu accusing political leaders of politicising the event and discouraging their members from attending. Speaking at a United Church of Zambia service in Lilayi on 21 October, Lungu defended his decision to establish the National Day and said it would continue to be observed annually. He said participation in prayer was a personal decision and that no one should prevent others from worshipping God.

The 2020 observance took place on 18 October during the COVID-19 pandemic. It was the sixth National Day of Prayer and Fasting. President Lungu and other senior government officials attended the national event, while clergy from Catholic and Protestant churches led the prayers. The Zambia Conference of Catholic Bishops, Evangelical Fellowship of Zambia and Council of Churches in Zambia did not attend, citing opposition to government involvement in religious affairs, although some members attended in their individual capacities. The observance took place amid wider criticism from religious groups over the government's role in organising national religious events. The proposed 10,000-seat National House of Prayer also remained unfinished at the end of the year.

=== 2026 adjustment ===
On 8 October 2026, the church mother bodies in Zambia made an announcement that, after a discussion with the government of Zambia, the National Day of Prayer, Fasting, Repentance and Reconciliation would no-longer be observed on 18 October starting from 2026. The vice president of the Council of Churches in Zambia, Bishop Juden Siachitema, read the notice on behalf of the church mother bodies, stating that the anniversary of Zambia being declared a christian nation by Frederick Chiluba in 1991, 29 December, would now become a public holiday starting from 2026, with the observation being named the National Day of Prayer and Christian Heritage.

On 9 October 2026, the secretary to the cabinet, Patrick Kangwa, confirmed the announcement, stating that they decided to revoke Statutory Instrument No. 78 of 2015 which was used to make 18 October a public holiday in Zambia, with immediate effect. He announced that the government has issued Statutory Instrument No. 73 of 2026 to declare 29 December a public holiday with immediate effect, with the first observation being on 29 December 2026.

== Observance ==
The National Day of Prayer, Fasting, Repentance and Reconciliation was observed across Zambia through prayer services, fasting, and national, provincial, and district commemorations, with national observances often led by the President and Christian clergy.

=== Theme ===
Each year's observance was centred on an official theme announced by the government ahead of 18 October. The theme served as the focus for the year's prayers and public gatherings, often highlighting national priorities such as unity, peace, repentance, prosperity, and divine guidance. It was used by churches, government institutions, and community organisations to shape activities held during the commemoration.
