= Christian Council of Tanzania =

Christian ecumenical organization founded in Tanzania in 1964

The Christian Council of Tanzania is a Christian ecumenical organization founded in Tanzania in 1964. It is a member of the World Council of Churches, the Fellowship of Christian Councils in Southern Africa and the Fellowship of Christian Councils and Churches in the Great Lakes and Horn of Africa.

== See also ==
- Religion in Tanzania
- Freedom of religion in Tanzania
- Evangelical Lutheran Church in Tanzania
- Anglican Church of Tanzania
- Catholic Church in Tanzania
- Protestants in Tanzania
