= Tanzania Heart Institute =

Geography
- Location: Ada Estate, Kinondoni, Kinondoni District, Dar es Salaam Region, Tanzania
- Coordinates: 6.7878°S 39.2756°E

Organisation
- Type: Specialist

Services
- Speciality: Cardiology

History
- Closed: 12 April 2012

Links
- Lists: Hospitals in Tanzania

The Tanzania Heart Institute (THI) is a specialized cardiac clinic located in Ada Estate of Kinondoni Ward in Kinondoni District of Dar es Salaam, Tanzania, managed by a non-profit organization. It is located in the northern part of the city, in the residential district of Ada Estate.

It was founded by Dr. Ferdinand Masau. The institute was closed by the government in 2012.
