= Ada Estate =

- Neighborhood of Kinondoni
- Interactive map of Ada Estate
- Coordinates: 6°46′59.88″S 39°16′4.08″E
- Country: Tanzania
- Region: Dar es Salaam Region
- District: Kinondoni District
- Ward: Kinondoni, Kinondoni District

Ethnic groups
  - Settler: Swahili
  - Ancestral: Zaramo
- Tanzanian Postal Code: 14110

Ada Estate is a primarily residential neighborhood and suburb of Kinondoni ward in Kinondoni District of Dar es Salaam Region in (Tanzania). In this suburb there are several embassies, including the French embassy; the American embassy was also in Ada Estate before being transferred after the 1998 United States embassy bombings. The suburb also includes some of the most advanced hospitals in Dar es Salaam, including the Tanzania Heart Institute (the only Tanzanian hospital specialized in cardiology).
