= Ijumaa Mosque =

Mosque in Stone Town, Zanzibar, Tanzania

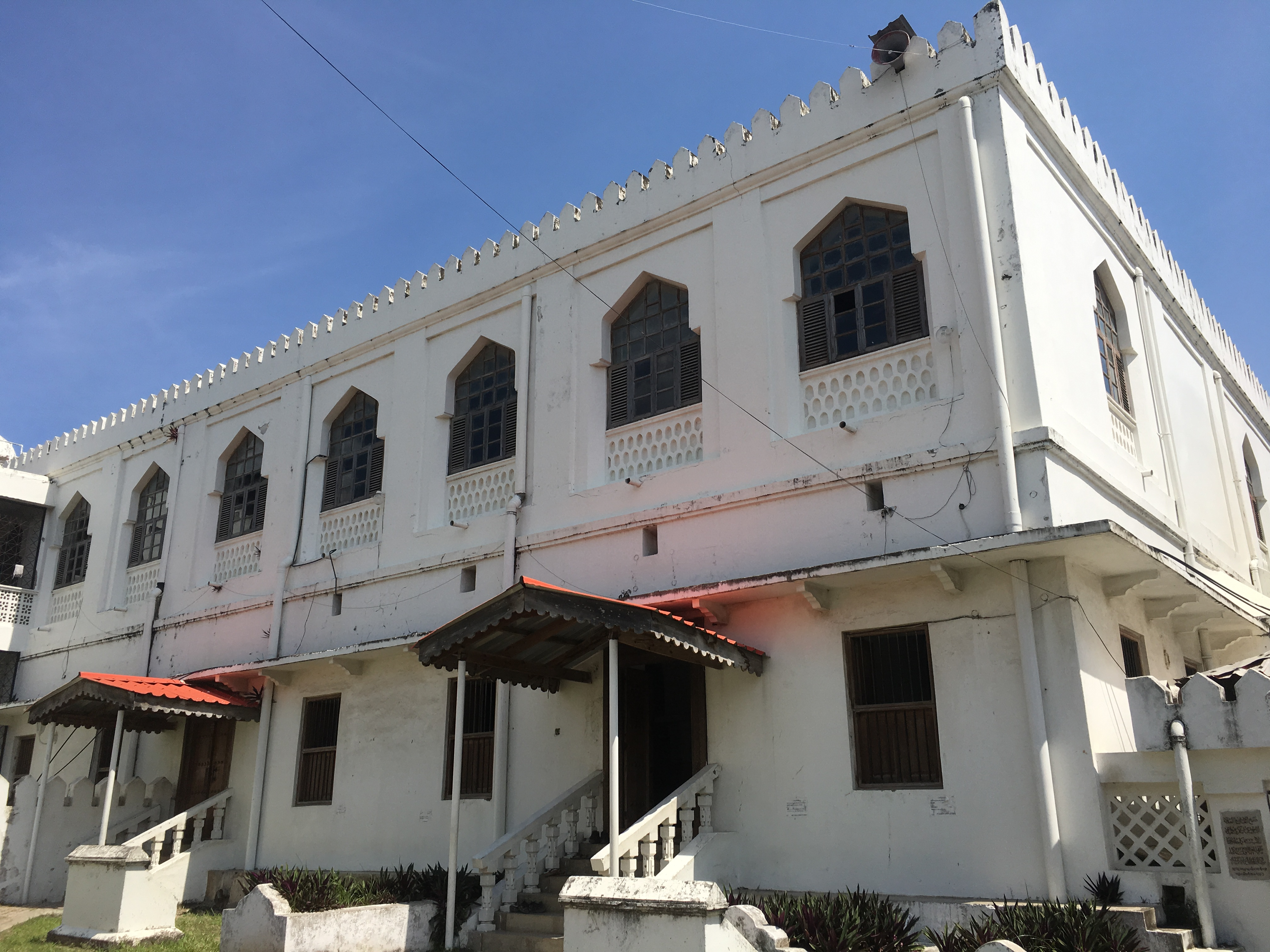

- Location within Tanzania

Religion
- Affiliation: Islam
- Ecclesiastical or organizational status: Mosque
- Status: Active

Location
- Location: Stone Town, Zanzibar
- Country: Tanzania
- Interactive map of Ijumaa Mosque
- Coordinates: 6°09′33″S 39°11′32″E

Architecture
- Type: Mosque
- Style: Arabesque; Swahili
- Completed: 1994 (renovations)

The Ijumaa Mosque is a mosque in Stone Town, Zanzibar, Tanzania. The mosque was completely renovated in 1994 in the modern Arabesque Swahili style.

== See also ==
- Islam in Tanzania
- List of mosques in Tanzania
