= Malindi Mosque =

Mosque in Stone Town, Zanzibar, Tanzania

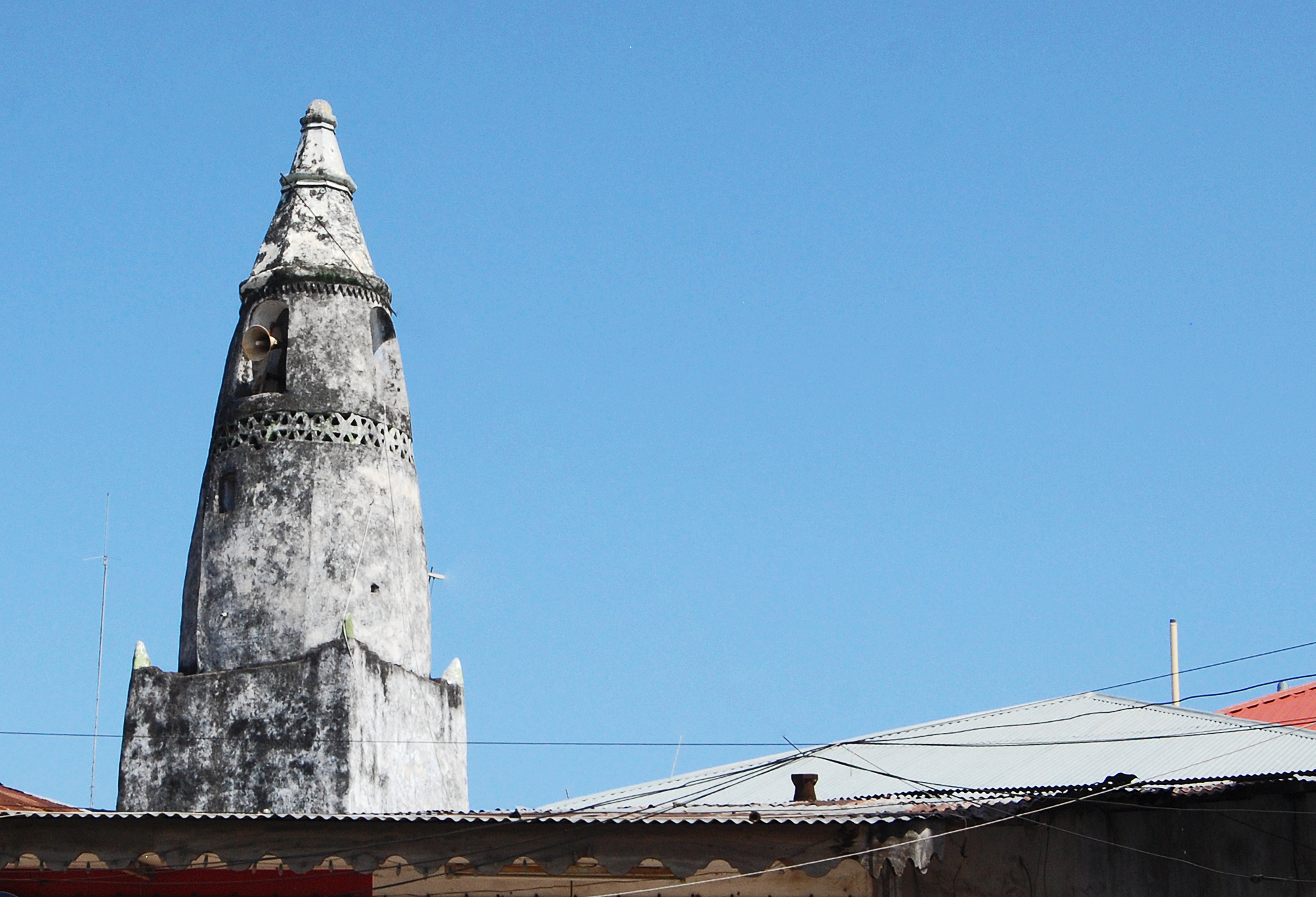

- Location within Tanzania

Religion
- Affiliation: Islam
- Ecclesiastical or organisational status: Mosque
- Status: Active

Location
- Location: Stone Town, Zanzibar
- Country: Tanzania
- Interactive map of Malindi Mosque
- Coordinates: 6°09′33″S 39°11′29″E

Architecture
- Type: Mosque
- Style: Swahili
- Founder: Muhammad ben Abdulkadir al-Mansaby
- Completed: 1250 AH (1834/1835 CE)
- Minaret: 1

The Malindi Mosque is a mosque in Stone Town, Zanzibar, Tanzania, located near the port.

== Overview ==
The present mosque was built in 1250 AH (1834/1835 CE) by Muhammad ben Abdulkadir al-Mansaby from the Benadir coast in Somalia. He was a rich merchant in Zanzibar from the 1820s to the 1840s. The building was enlarged twice in 1841 and 1890. The mosque was possibly built on the site of an older mosque that might have dated from the 17th century or earlier. Some travel guides claim an origin in the 15th century.

It has some unusual architectural features including a conical minaret, one of just three conical minarets in East Africa, and a square platform.

== See also ==
- Islam in Tanzania
- List of mosques in Tanzania
