= National Christian Council =

National Christian Council may refer to:

- National Christian Council of China
- National Christian Council in Japan
