= St. Joseph's Cathedral, Dar es Salaam =

Cathedral in Dar es Salaam, Tanzania

Coordinates: 6°49′10″S 39°17′17″E

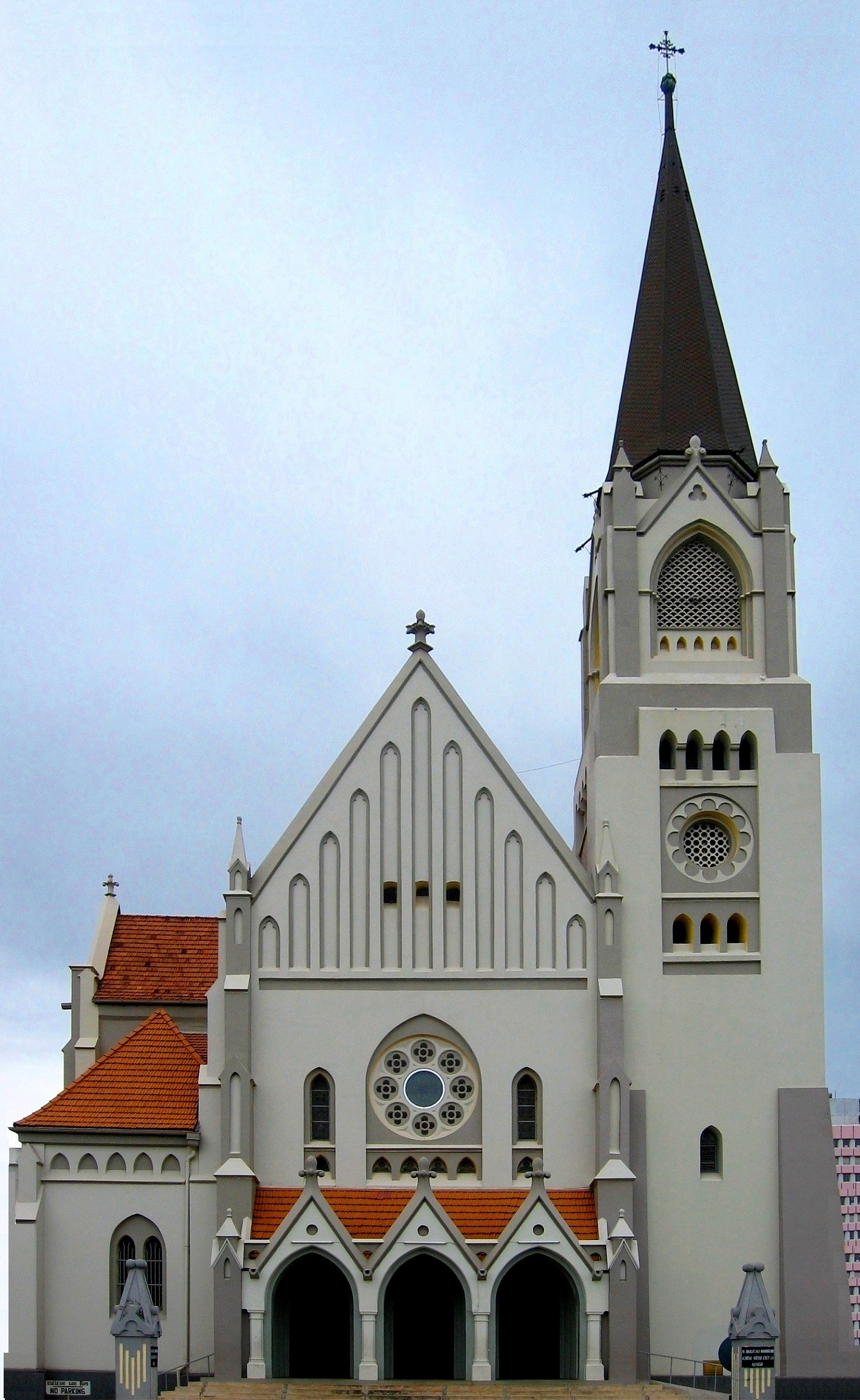
St. Joseph's Cathedral, Posta Dar es Salaam

The Saint Joseph's Metropolitan Cathedral (German: Metropolitan-Kathedrale St. Josef) is a Roman Catholic cathedral in Dar es Salaam, Tanzania. It is a Gothic church located in Sokoine Drive, facing the harbour, close to the White Fathers' House. It was built by the Germans between 1897 and 1902 and consecrated as a Catholic church in 1905. The cathedral is the seat of the Dar es Salaam archdiocese. Among the most notable features of the church are the stained-glass windows behind the altar.
