= Freedom of religion in Tanzania =

Freedom of religion in Tanzania refers to the extent to which people in Tanzania are freely able to practice their religious beliefs, taking into account both government policies and societal attitudes toward religious groups.

The government of Tanzania and the semiautonomous government of Zanzibar both recognize religious freedom as a principle and make efforts to protect it. The government of Zanzibar appoints Muslim religious officials in Zanzibar. The main body of law in Tanzania and Zanzibar is secular, but Muslims have the option to use religious courts for family-related cases.

Individual cases of religiously motivated violence have occurred against both Christians and Muslims. There are reports of young men in Zanzibar being recruited into organizations such as al-Shabaab and ISIS-M.

The policies and ideology of Ujamaa espoused by Tanzania's first government following independence from the United Kingdom in the 1960s emphasized national unity over religious or ethnic division, and this is reflected by the strong anti-discrimination rhetoric in Tanzania's constitution, which is still in effect as of 2019. While Ujamaa was abandoned as a state project in 1985, and religious discord has risen somewhat since then, academic and NGO sources credit Ujamaa for contributing to a climate of religious freedom and relative social stability in Tanzania.

== Demographics ==
A 2010 Pew Forum survey estimates approximately 61 percent of the population is Christian, 35 percent Muslim, and 4 percent other religious groups. A 2020 Pew Forum survey shows similar statistics. A separate 2010 Pew Forum Report estimates more than half of the population practices elements of African traditional religions in their daily lives. There are no domestic surveys covering religious affiliation.

On the mainland, large Muslim communities are concentrated in coastal areas, with some Muslim minorities located inland in urban areas. Christian groups include Roman Catholics, Protestants (including Pentecostal Christian groups), Seventh-day Adventists, The Church of Jesus Christ of Latter-day Saints, and Jehovah's Witnesses. Other groups include Buddhists, Hindus, Sikhs, Baháʼís, animists, and those who did not express a religious preference. Zanzibar's 1.3 million residents are 99 percent Muslim, according to a U.S. government estimate, of whom two-thirds are Sunni, according to a 2012 Pew Forum report. The remainder consists of several Shia groups, mostly of Asian descent.

== History ==
=== Background ===
Tanzania is made up of two regions, a mainland region on the African continent and the archipelago of Zanzibar, which were unified in the 1960s. The mainland region of Tanganyika was first delineated as part of the partition of Africa in the Berlin Conference in 1884. By contrast, Zanzibar's history as a distinct region goes back to the 13th century, when it was home to Swahili city states.

Exact dates for the introduction of Islam to East Africa are unknown, but the first recorded evidence of Muslim presence dates to 830 CE, and significant Islamic city-states were established in Zanzibar and along the mainland coast by the 11th century. These city-states reached their apex in the 14th and 15th centuries, after which they deteriorated following conflict with Portugal in the 16th to 17th centuries. Portuguese control of Zanzibar was brief, as they were deposed by the Omani Empire, which would eventually move its capital to Zanzibar. During the early 19th century, Zanzibar became a significant node in the slave trade, which would not end until the early 20th century. Christianity arrived in Tanganyika in the 19th century in the form of various European missions, and around the same time Sufi missionaries would spread Islam beyond the coastline regions. Both Christian and Muslim practices in Tanzania are heavily influenced by syncretism with older African religious traditions.

During the independence movement, both Christians and Muslims played significant roles in the Tanganyika African National Union. Following independence, however, discourse shifted and the Christian and Muslim communities were sometimes presented as being politically at odds.

=== Early independence and the Zanzibar Revolution (1961–1964) ===
In 1961, British rule ended in Tanganyika, with Julius Nyerere becoming its first president in 1962, while Zanzibar continued to be a British protectorate ruled by an Arab monarchy. In 1964, the Sultanate of Zanzibar was overthrown in the Zanzibar Revolution. The revolution was accompanied by extreme levels of violence by African revolutionaries against Arabs and South Asians, who were predominantly Muslim or Hindu and were identified with the ruling class of the Sultanate of Zanzibar. The legacy of this event is contested, as the extreme and racially-targeted violence is seen by parts of Zanzibar's society as retaliation for oppression suffered under the Sultanate, which had had a significant African slave trade. The forces perpetrating the violence were led by John Okello, a Christian who believed that it was his duty to liberate Zanzibar from the "Muslim Arabs", despite the fact that the African population in Zanzibar and the revolutionary Afro-Shirazi Party (ASP) were predominantly Muslim as well. Okello's actions and militant Christian beliefs alienated others in the ASP, and he was soon marginalized, stripped of rank and eventually deported.

=== Unification and Ujamaa (1964–1985) ===
Following the revolution, Zanzibar merged with Tanganyika to form Tanzania, with Nyerere as president. The ruling elite on the mainland, who were religiously diverse, preferred secular rule, whereas Zanzibar maintained a degree of autonomy and implemented a semisecular state. While Islam was not officially a state religion, it was accorded special status and privileges.

In 1967, Tanzania pivoted further to the left politically, and began to promote Ujamaa, a socialist ideology which emphasized freedom, equality and unity as its central principles. The country also adopted a constitution which included strongly worded sections against discrimination, including religious discrimination. Human Rights Watch credits Ujamaa as having been an effective model of national unity, contributing toward Ujamaa's relative stability and social harmony, with the caveat that the emphasis on unity also made it difficult at times to investigate human rights abuses. Tanzania is the only country in East Africa that has not experienced continuous cycles of ethnic, religious or political violence since its independence from colonial rule.

=== Post-Nyerere (1985–present) ===
Following Nyerere's retirement from politics after his last term in 1985, the government of Tanzania largely abandoned Ujamaa as its ideology, although as of 2019 the 1977 constitution remains in effect. Since the end of the Ujamaa period, there has been increased contention between Muslims and the government, and to a lesser extent between Muslims and Christians. In 1993 and 1998, tensions rose to the level of violent conflict between Muslims and state security forces, with both incidents resulting in many deaths. Academics have attributed this decline in religious harmony to the collapse of Ujamaa in the sense of both its national-unity ideals and its social-welfare policies, the influence of worldwide increases in religious militancy toward the end of the 20th century and the beginning of the 21st, religious revival movements inside Tanzania, and the redefinition of political camps following the liberalization of the economy beginning in the late 1980s.

Witchcraft was outlawed in 2015. As of 2019, however, there continued to be witchcraft-associated ritual killings reported, with the police arresting those suspected of involvement. By 2022, the number of killings had gone down, but trafficking of persons with albinism was common.

While religious violence is rare, it does occur. In 2017, there were three instances of vandalism and property destruction, including arson, against religious buildings and clergy.

== Legal framework ==
The constitution of the union government of Tanzania and the constitution of the semiautonomous government in Zanzibar both prohibit religious discrimination and provide for freedom of religious choice. The law prohibits the formation of religious political parties; the law also prohibits any person from taking any action or making statements with the intent of insulting the religious beliefs of another person, with a possible sentence of one year's imprisonment.

The government does not designate religious affiliation on passports or records of vital statistics. Police reports must state religious affiliation if an individual will be required to provide sworn testimony. Applications for medical care must specify religious affiliation so that any specific religious customs may be observed. The law requires the government to record the religious affiliation of every prisoner and provide facilities for worship for prisoners.

=== Leadership of the Muslim community ===
On the mainland, the National Muslim Council of Tanzania elects the mufti. On Zanzibar, the President of Zanzibar appoints the mufti, who serves as a leader of the Muslim community and as a public servant assisting with local governmental affairs. The Mufti of Zanzibar nominally approves all Islamic activities and supervises all mosques on Zanzibar. The mufti also approves religious lectures by visiting Islamic clergy and supervises the importation of Islamic literature from outside Zanzibar.

=== Secular and religious courts ===
On the mainland, secular laws govern Christians and Muslims in both criminal and civil cases. In family-related cases involving inheritance, marriage, divorce, and the adoption of minors, the law also recognizes customary practices, which could include religious practices. In such cases, some Muslims choose to consult religious leaders in lieu of bringing a court case. Muslims in Zanzibar have the option of bringing cases to a civil or qadi (Islamic court or judge) for matters of divorce, child custody, inheritance, and other issues covered by Islamic law. All cases tried in Zanzibar courts, except those involving Zanzibari constitutional matters and sharia, may be appealed to the Union Court of Appeals on the mainland. Decisions of Zanzibar's qadi courts may be appealed to a special court consisting of the Zanzibar chief justice and five other sheikhs. The President of Zanzibar appoints the chief qadi, who oversees the qadi courts and is recognized as the senior Islamic scholar responsible for interpreting the Quran. There are no qadi courts on the mainland.

=== Education ===
Public schools may teach religion, but it is not a part of the official national curriculum. School administration or parent and teacher associations must approve such classes, which are taught on an occasional basis by parents or volunteers. Public school registration forms must specify a child's religious affiliation so administrators can assign students to the appropriate religion class if one is offered. Students may also choose to opt out of religious studies. In public schools, students are allowed to wear the hijab but not the niqāb.

== 2020s ==
A 2020 Pew Forum survey estimates that approximately 63% of the population identifies as Christian, 34% as Muslim, and 5% practitioners of other religions. Most Christians are Catholics and Lutherans, although there are also Anglicans, Pentecostals and other groups. In 2020, the Vatican noted that 30.41% of the population are Catholic.

In 2026, Freedom House scored Tanzania 2 out of 4 for religious freedom.

== See also ==
- Freedom of religion in Africa by country
- Human rights in Tanzania
- Religion in Tanzania
