= White Fathers' House =

Coordinates: 6.8187866°S 39.289088°E

The White Fathers' House (also known as Atiman House) is a historical building in Dar es Salaam, Tanzania. It is located in Sokoine Street, north-east of St. Joseph's Cathedral. It is named after the White Fathers, as the building has been the seat of their mission since 1922. The alternative name of "Atiman" refers to Dr. Adrien Atiman, a Catholic catechist and medical doctor, originally from Tindirma, Mali who was freed from slavery in Nigeria by the White Fathers and later served in Tanzania until his death, in 1924.

The building is believed to have been built in the 1860s (possibly 1866) as a harem for Sultan Majid of Zanzibar. In 1922, it was sold to the White Fathers, and became their main base in East Africa. The building is open to visitors and has a little exhibit with old pictures of Dar's sea front, dating back to the years of German rule (early 20th century).
