= Christian Council of Lesotho =

Christian organization in Lesotho

The Christian Council of Lesotho is an ecumenical Christian organization in Lesotho. It was founded in 1965 and is a member of the World Council of Churches and the Fellowship of Christian Councils in Southern Africa.
