= BAKWATA =

Islamic organization based in Tanzania

National Muslim Council of Tanzania Swahili: Baraza Kuu la Waislamu Tanzania (BAKWATA)
- Abbreviation: BAKWATA
- Predecessor: EAMWS
- Formation: 1968
- Type: Islamic Organization
- Headquarters: Kinondoni ward, Kinondoni District
- Location: Dar es Salaam Region
- Region served: Tanzania
- Members: all Tanzania Muslim
- Official language: Swahili, Arabic and English
- Chief Mufti: Sheikh Aboubakary Zubeiry

The National Muslim Council of Tanzania (BAKWATA) is a leading faith-based Islamic organisation headquartered in Kinondoni ward of Kinondoni District in Dar es Salaam Region, Tanzania.

== History ==
BAKWATA registered in 1968.

== Organization ==
The Council has branch offices across Tanzania with a network from the national to grassroots level with 22 regional and 169 district offices served by over 3000 sheikhs.

It coordinates around 10,800 mosques. It owns around 40 acres of land in each of its 22 regions. It operates 32 secondary schools, two teachers’ colleges, 30 theological colleges, and a radio station. It supports numerous madrasas.

== Environmental work ==
From the late 1990s, BAKWATA has organised and facilitated training for its Muslim scholars on environmental issues. Ongoing work on environmental issues includes: environmental education for madrasa pupils in 10 coastal districts, environmental education and management clubs in 10 secondary schools and spreading the use of environmental theological materials in religious ceremonies and sermons on Friday prayers for more than 80 imams and sheikhs throughout Tanzania.From 2016 BAKWATA offered free education under Mufti Office. This knowledge is offered to Islamic Imams and Qur'an teachers in different regions.

The course is aimed to empower them in computer and information technology and conflict arbitration.

Its headquarters is in Kinondoni Shamba area, Kinondoni district, Dar es salaam Region.

== See also ==
- Islam in Tanzania
