= Council of Churches in Zambia =

The Council of Churches in Zambia is an ecumenical Christian organization in Zambia. It was founded in 1945(according to the "World Council of Churches listing") as the Christian Council of Northern Rhodesia and is a member of the World Council of Churches and the Fellowship of Christian Councils in Southern Africa. It is also a member of three church mother bodies in Zambia; Evangelical Fellowship of Zambia (EFZ), and the Zambia Episcopal Conference (ZEC).
