= Islam in Zanzibar =

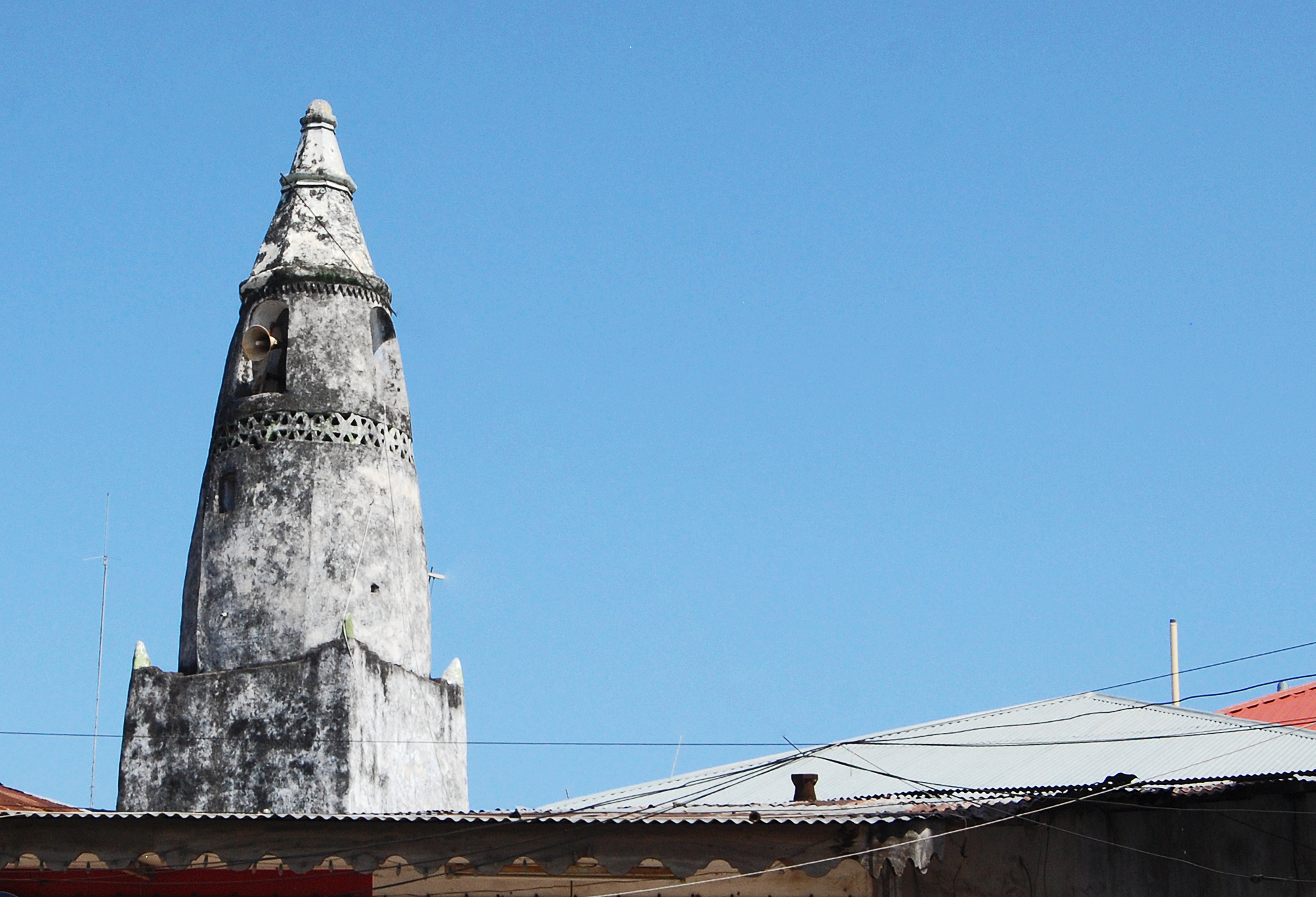
Malindi Mosque in Stone Town

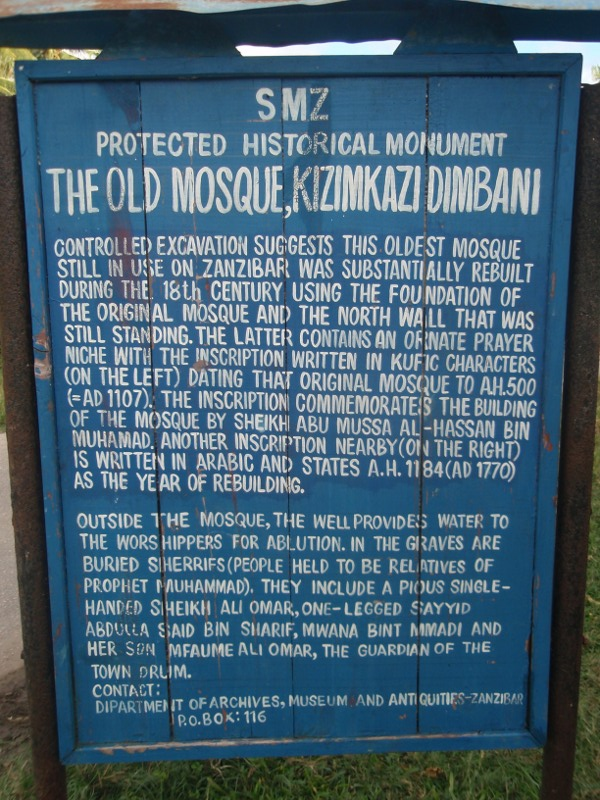
Kizimkazi Mosque

Islam is the most prominent religion on the semi-autonomous Zanzibar archipelago and could be considered the Islamic center in the United Republic of Tanzania. Around 99% of the population in the islands are Muslim, with two-thirds being Sunni Muslim and a minority, Isma'ili and Twelver Shia. Islam has a long presence on the islands, with archeological findings dating back to the 10th century, and has been an intrinsic part in shaping mercantile and maritime Swahili culture in Zanzibar as well as along the East African coast.

== History of Islam in Zanzibar ==
=== Origins ===
Archeological findings suggest that Islam has been present in the Zanzibar archipelago for more than a millennium. Of the oldest archeological findings are large Friday mosque in Ras Mkumbuu, which has been dated back to the 10th century, and Kufic inscriptions on the mosque in Kizimkazi dated at A.D. 1106. There are different historical accounts on how Islam was introduced along the East African coast, the Zanzibar archipelago included. Some suggesting that Islam was brought through Arab traders from the southern part of the Arabic peninsula, others consider the spread was initiated by groups of Zaidites from Ethiopia and Somalia, and a third group suggest that Islam came via Persia. Despite these different trajectories Islam has worked as unifying force, through which a mercantile, cosmopolitan and urban Swahili culture was formed in relation to the African hinterlands.

=== Civilization ===
Historically, being Swahili along the East African coast has meant having an understanding of the message of Islam and, at least nominally, some active participation. In a context of trans-cultural interactions Islam connected people via common ethics and moral conduct and placed people along the coast within a universal imaginary of the Islamic umma. Swahili townspeople were viewed to have more in common with their trade partners and fellow Muslims abroad than they had with groups in the nearby African mainland. This often meant that ancestral roots were placed outside Africa, with groups stressing shirazi origin of Persia and with Zanzibar becoming a central location for the Omani sultanate in the 1800s also of Arab descent. Over time Islam became valued as a central aspect of what it meant to be a civilized person (in Swahili muungwana, mstaarabu), that contained assigning prestige to things connected with the distant Islamic heartlands.

=== Islam in the Zanzibari Protectorate ===
In 1890, Zanzibar was made a British protectorate under the Heligoland-Zanzibar treaty, a result of German military intimidation and expansion on mainland Tanganyika. Given long-standing historical, cultural, and structural links between India, already a British protectorate, and Zanzibar, British officials used India as a model to implement similar policies in Zanzibar. Through indirect rule, they sought to maintain preexisting legal structures and minimize their involvement. However, British interventions quickly wrangled existing power and administrative structures to match their own.

Prior to the establishment of Zanzibar as a colonial protectorate, the sultanate relied on courts to enforce and define the bounds of Islamic sharia law; courts thus became spaces where judges (kadhis) and defendants negotiated the social, legal, and moral values of the island community. On the other hand, the British saw the judicial realm as an arena to reinforce their own political domination. To this end, the British created their own set of courts operated by the crown that ran in parallel with preexisting kadhi courts led by the sultanate; the system in which a court case would be handled was negotiated by the jurisdiction of the sultanate. However, over time, the British wrestled control from the kadhi courts into their own through narrowing subjects and cases.

In the East Africa Order in Council of 1897, the British government formally established Her Britannic Majesty’s Court, the first central colonial court in Zanzibar. This decree routed cases where British subjects were defendants to the British court, regardless of whose jurisdiction the plaintiff fell under, as well as moving jurisdiction of criminal disputes squarely under British influence. As British judges in this court were not trained in Islamic law, native court advisors (mufti) were appointed to assist British judges with handing down Islamic rulings. The Native Courts Decree was subsequently passed in 1899 by Consul General Arthur Hardinge, citing a lack of public confidence and uniformity of judgment in Islamic courts. The act restructured Islamic courts into a tiered hierarchy - district courts, a state-wide court for Zanzibar and the neighboring island of Pemba, and the Supreme Court of His Highness the Sultan. The two court systems were eventually merged in 1923 owing to the end of World War I and British concerns about their increasing involvement in the colony.

During Zanzibar’s infancy as a protectorate, education was dominated by Islamic madrasas that emphasized spiritual learning through careful study, repetition, and memorization of Quranic verses. Such schools, while popular among the general population, drew the ire of British officials, who saw madrasas as incapable of producing staff fit to serve in administrative positions in the Protectorate. Similarly, Arab scholars’ (ulama) critiqued madrasas’ “parrot-like repetition" of verses and their preference for Arabic in teaching despite most students’ vastly greater proficiency in Swahili. In 1912, the British colonial office introduced government-sponsored schools, attempting to revitalize a post-abolition clove industry that previously relied on the Zanzibari slave trade and create a self-sufficient administration around the industry to minimize colonial involvement. Nevertheless, madrasas persistently saw higher enrollments compared to government schools, leading to 1924 reforms of government schools’ curricula underwent led by the four kadhi’s of the remaining Zanzibari sultanate courts to incorporate introductory topics in Islam and close study of a subset of the Qu’ran translated into Swahili.

Debates around education continued throughout the 1930s. Particularly contentious was the place of language in Quranic schools. While the British aimed to provide an education that would be useful to most Zanzibaris by teaching in Swahili, the minority Arab elite pushed back, citing Arabic’s position as a “modern” language and emblematic of Zanzibar’s Islamic character. Although the quality of Arabic language education remained low due to a lack of qualified teachers and little colonial investment, British officials nonetheless recognized that Arabic and Islam were tightly coupled, and that some African Zanzibaris idolized the Arabic-speaking elite. While colonial education programs supported promising students’ education abroad in the Middle East or Makerere University (Uganda), colonial Islamic education in Zanzibar faltered as Zanzibaris boycotted the schools for not providing a proper framework to comprehend the faith.

In the 1940s and 50s, a third wave of educational reform began as British officials gave greater control of Islamic schools and their curricula to Islamic scholars on the island, deepening engagement with Islamic and Zanzibari history, Arabic, and Islam itself. Investments in foreign education were similarly increased to create a deeper base of educators qualified to teach Arabic at higher levels of fluency. The reforms were largely successful in recapturing interest in Islamic education from the Zanzibari populace; enrollments skyrocketed as the boycott ended. The hallmark of these reforms was the establishment of the Muslim Academy, the first Zanzibari ma’had which took example from the British colonies of Nigeria and India in establishing centers of Islamic learning to prepare graduates for positions in civil service. Although the British endeavored to make the Muslim Academy an East African regional center of learning like the Nigerian Kano School of Native Law, various obstacles, from a lack of acceptance from surrounding states to the revolution, hindered this vision from coming to fruition.

=== Islam after the revolution ===
The Zanzibar Revolution of 1964 ushered in significant sociopolitical changes to the island. John Okello, a Ugandan immigrant to Zanzibar, led the revolt which deposed the Arab-led sultanate. The Afro-Shirazi Party, which Okello was a member of, took the place of the sultanate, with Abeid Karume, its leader, taking the role of Zanzibar’s Head of State. In the wake of the revolution, Islam’s seeming omnipresence in Zanzibari life waned almost immediately despite the island’s population being overwhelmingly Muslim. While the revolution was not inherently religious, its perpetrators were intentional in maiming Islamic scholarly and religious materials, mosques, and bodies so as to make them unfit for Islamic burial. Consequently, many families, especially those of scholars and businesspeople, fled Zanzibar; those who remained took on a lower profile in religious practice and activity and their private holdings were nationalized.

The departure of the Zanzibari social elite from the island meant the structures they maintained – waqf, Islamic schools, kadhi courts, and social hierarchy – were similarly ruptured. Karume, seeking to solidify his authority, viewed Islam as a threat and restricted Islamic religious education through limiting Islamic scholars’ public influence, removing Arabic and Islam from school curricula, shuttered the Muslim Academy, and ended programs to send promising Islamic scholars abroad for further training. He similarly suppressed Islamic practice, especially in public, a keystone of Islamic life in Zanzibar prior to the revolution. He surveilled public demonstrations and ritual (e.g. dhikr and ziyara), ended Ramadan sermons and Eid al-Adha celebrations, and redirected Eid prayers from mosques to ASP headquarters. Opposition, both in Islamic institutions and scholars previously loyal to the sultanate, were quickly deposed, leaving vacuums of power and even culture where Islam previously filled; Karume was also deeply suspicious of "experts", and his revolutionary council was largely illiterate, allowing himself to rule largely unchallenged.

In 1967, Karume's regime would fully outlaw teaching Islam in any capacity through government schools, claiming that the government was not responsible for the religion of the population, but rather to equip the population for a globalized future through exposure to "global" languages like French. Further, in the leadup to this ban, teachers' employment dropped significantly from its pre-revolution peak, meaning that new generations of Zanzibaris no longer had access to teachings, texts, or public displays of Islam that could continue this centuries-old deep-rooted Islamic tradition. In totality, Karume's approach, while not necessarily inherently anti-Islamic, needed to upend the deep Islamic roots in the social and political spheres to cement his own influence.

== Muslim denominations ==
=== Sunni ===
In Zanzibar today, around 90 percent of all Muslims belong to the Sunni tradition and generally follow the Shafi’i and Maliki school of jurisprudence.

==== Sufi movements ====
Sufi brotherhoods include the Qadhriyya and Shadhiliyya. Sufi brotherhoods grew in influence during the 19th century in relation to increased movements and flows of migrants during a time when the archipelago was a cultural, commercial and religious center along the Swahili coast. Spread through migrants from Hadramaut (Yemen) and Benadir (Somali Coast) Sufi brotherhoods were in contrast to Ibadism of the ruling Omani ruling class open to former slaves and came to facilitate ways of integrating people from the African hinterlands into the Swahili society.

==== Salafi movements ====
Salafi inspired groups have been present in Zanzibar during the last part of the 20th century, and includes the Wahabi-influenced movement Ansâr Sunna (the "defenders of the Sunna"). The latter are characterized by engagement in da'wa (mission) in order to revive Islam while criticizing the impact on local and traditional customs (mila) on Muslim practices on the Archipelago. This includes critique of practices such as ziara (visiting tombs of shaykhs), tawasud (blessing of saints in prayers), khitma (prayer for the dead), and Maulid celebrations (the birthday of the Prophet). Salafi groups critique also include practices of traditional healing (locally referred to as uganga) and western influences, the latter especially in relation to Zanzibar's growing tourist sector which are seen related to a general moral decay in the society such as increased alcohol consumption, improper clothing and prostitution.

=== Shia ===
Shia Muslims in Zanzibar include Shia Ithna’asharis, Shia Bohras and Shia Ismailis. Many within the Shia minority are of Asian descent with origins in India. For Shia Bohras, links to India remain important and are manifested in for instance marriage practices aimed at maintaining Asian identity. For Twelver Shia, Sheikh Abdulrazak Amiri, a Pan-Africanist Shia cleric based in Arusha, is working hard to spread the teachings of Ahlulbayt in Zanzibar.

== Notable Muslim clerics ==
- Sheikh (Sh.) Abdullah Saleh Farsy (Abdallah Salih Farsy) was an internationally known poet, scholar and Muslim historian in Zanzibar. He is well known for his contribution to Islamic knowledge, being first to translate the Quran into the Swahili language. He is the writer of the hagiography of Muslim Scholars in East Africa Baadhi ya Wanavyoni wa Kishafii wa Mashariki ya Afrika, a piece that was later translated into English as The Shafi'i Ulama of East Africa, ca. 1830–1970. A hagiographical account.
- Sh. Nassor Bachoo was a well known Muslim cleric in East Africa, particularly in Tanzania and Kenya, while he was a controversial figure in Zanzibar. He is considered to be the spiritual leader for Salafi reform movements such as the Ansâr Sunna.
- The late Sh. Amir Tajir was the Chief qadi in Zanzibar.

== Muslim politics ==
=== Uamsho ===
Uamsho (lit. awakening) is the popularized name of Jumuiya ya Uamsho na Mihadhara ya Kiislamu Zanzibar (the Association of Islamic Awareness and Public Discourse in Zanzibar)—also known by its Swahili acronym Jumiki. Uamsho was formed in the late 1990s and registered as an NGO in 2002. The organization's aim was to promote Muslim unity and Muslim rights via public preaching. Uamsho was from the start critical towards the political party of Chama cha Mapinduzi (CCM), accusing the government of restricting Muslim rights and corrupting Zanzibar by its inability to uphold moral order in society. In 2012, Uamsho engaged in widespread protests for a more autonomous Zanzibar in relation to a constitutional review process in Tanzania leading to tensions with the state after holding a public march in May 2012 despite a ban on religious public meetings. With the arrest of the Uamsho leader Sh. Musa Juma, supporters took their anger to the streets leading to riots with institutions linked to CCM and Christian churches being attacked. With tensions escalating during 2012 with a new round of riots in October all of Uamsho's main leaders, such as Sh. Farid Ahmad, were eventually arrested and jailed.

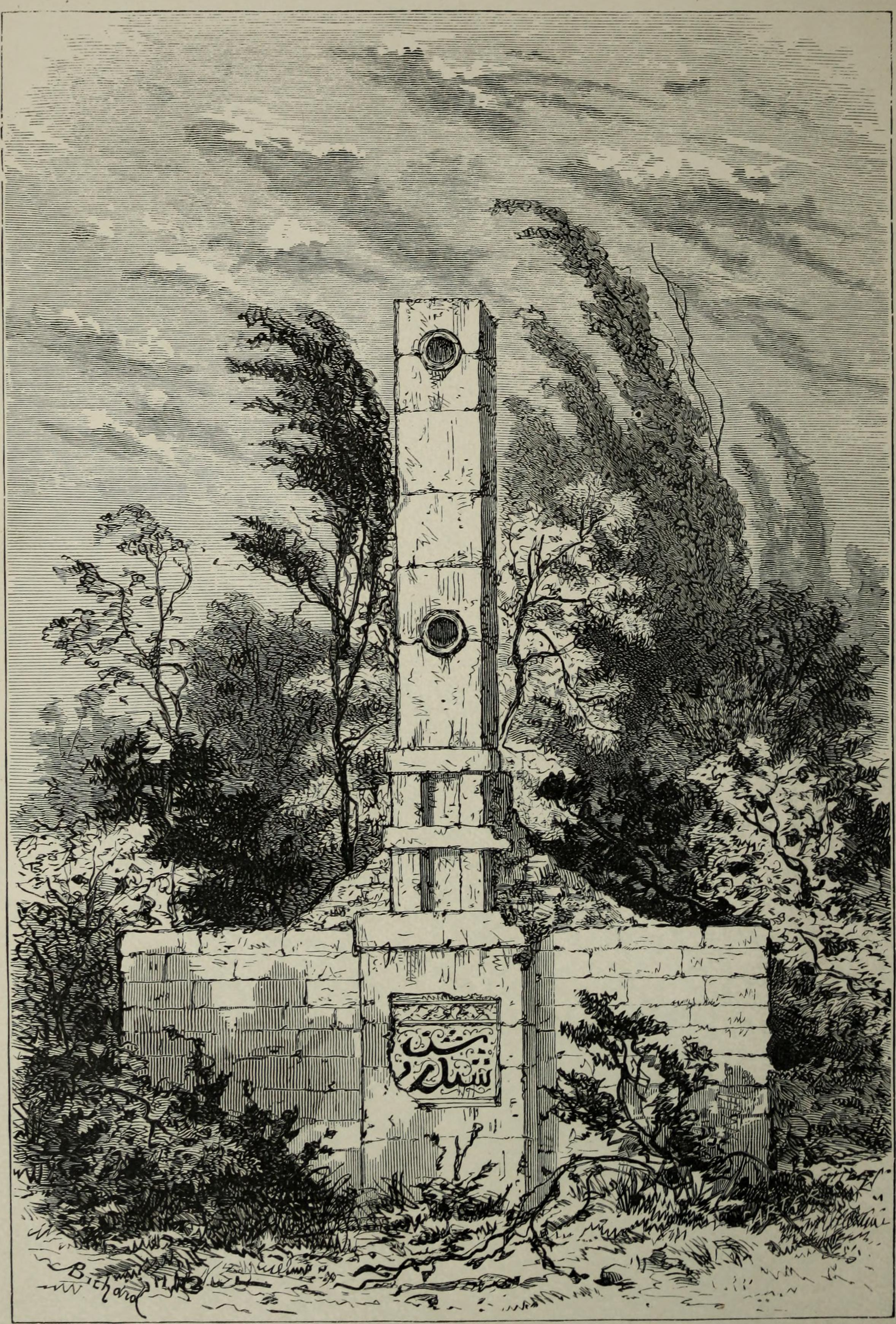
Ancient tomb at Tongo (1872 engraving)

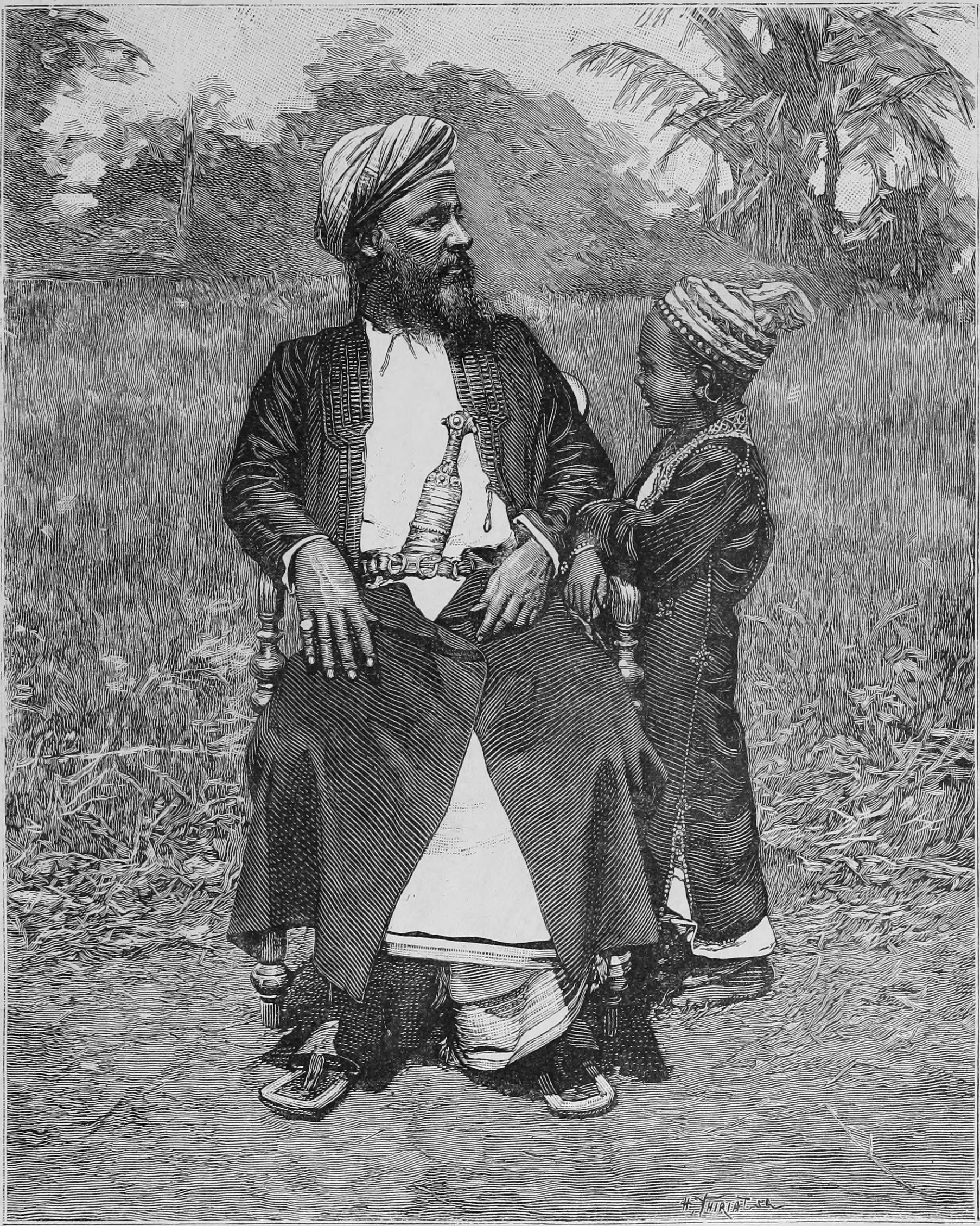

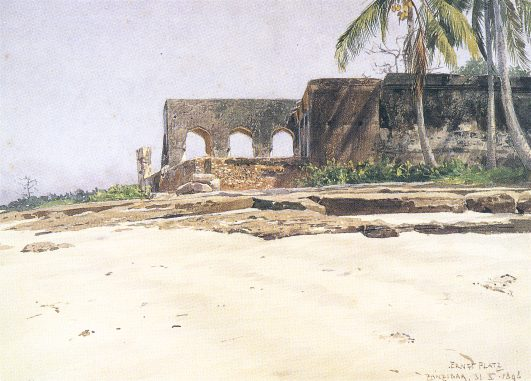
Old Mosque on the beach, 1898
