= Christian Council of Mozambique =

Christian organization in Mozambique

The Christian Council of Mozambique (Conselho Cristão de Moçambique) is an ecumenical Christian organization in Mozambique. It was founded in 1948 and is a member of the World Council of Churches and the Fellowship of Christian Councils in Southern Africa.

The council represents 20 Christian denominations, as well as the Bible Society and the Scripture Union.

CCM issues public statements on behalf of the denominations that it represents, as well as practical aid where needed.

In 1984, during the Mozambican Civil War, the CCM launched a Peace and Reconciliation Commission to work for peace. This came after its work throughout the country after the Mozambican War of Independence.
