= Azania Front Lutheran Church =

Church in Dar es Salaam, Tanzania

Coordinates: 6.8176°S 39.2912°E

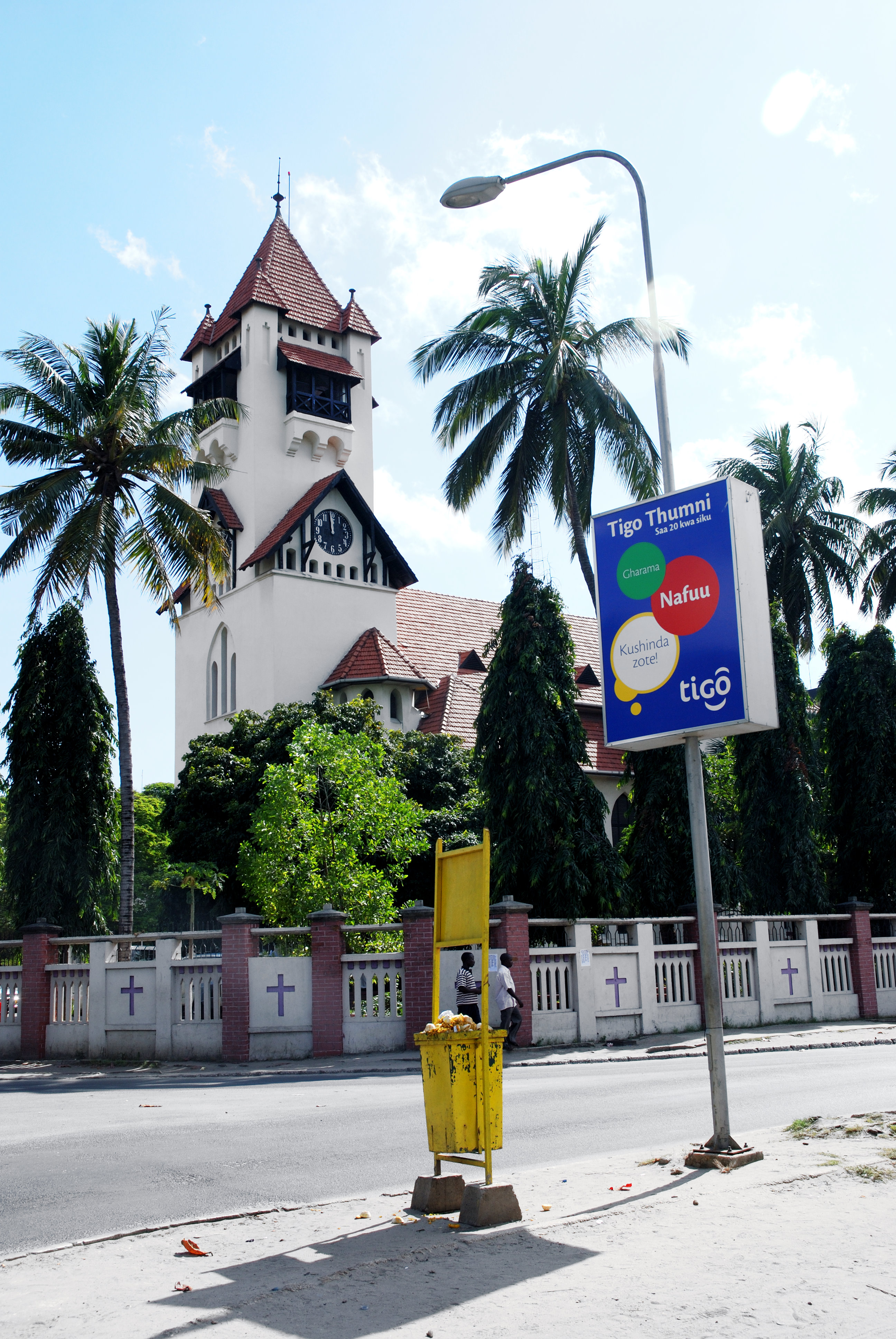
The Azania Front Lutheran Church as seen from Sokoine Drive

The Azania Front Lutheran Church is a Lutheran church in Dar es Salaam, Tanzania, serving as a cathedral for the local diocese. It is among the most well-known landmarks and tourist attractions of the city. It is in the city center, close to the ocean, facing the harbour. It was built by the German missionaries in 1898, in the Bavarian style of the time, with a red-tiled roof, tiled canopies over the windows and bright white walls.
