= Islam in Tanzania =

Tanzanian Muslims
- Gaddafi Mosque in Dodoma

Total population
- approx. 21 million (37%) in 2022

Regions with significant populations
- Eastern (coastal) part of the country, central Tanzania, Kigoma

Religions
- predominantly Sunni Islam with Shia and Ahmadiyya minorities

Tanzania is a Christian majority nation, with Islam being the largest minority faith in the country. According to a 2020 estimate by Pew research center, Muslims represent 34.1% of the total population. The faith was introduced by merchants visiting the Swahili coast, as it became connected to a larger maritime trade network dominated by Muslims. This would lead to local conversions and assimilations of foreign Muslims, ultimately causing the eventual formation of several officially Muslim political entities in the region. According to the Association of Religion Data Archives (ARDA), 55.3% of the population is Christian, 31.5% is Muslim, 11.3% practices traditional faiths, while 1.9% of the population is non-religious or adheres to other faiths as of 2020. The ARDA estimates that most Tanzanian Muslims are Sunni, with a small Shia minority, as of 2020.

On the mainland, Muslim communities are concentrated in coastal areas, with some large Muslim majorities also in inland urban areas especially and along the former caravan routes. More than 99% of the population of the Zanzibar archipelago is Muslim. The largest group of Muslims in Tanzania are Sunni Muslim, with significant Shia and Ahmadi minorities. According to the Pew Research Center research conducted in 2008 and 2009, 40% of the Muslim population of Tanzania identifies as Sunni, 20% as Shia, and 15% as Ahmadi, besides a smaller subset of Ibadism practitioners as well as non-denominational Muslims. Most Shias in Tanzania are of Asian/Indian descent. Some Ahmadis are also of South Asian descent.

== History ==
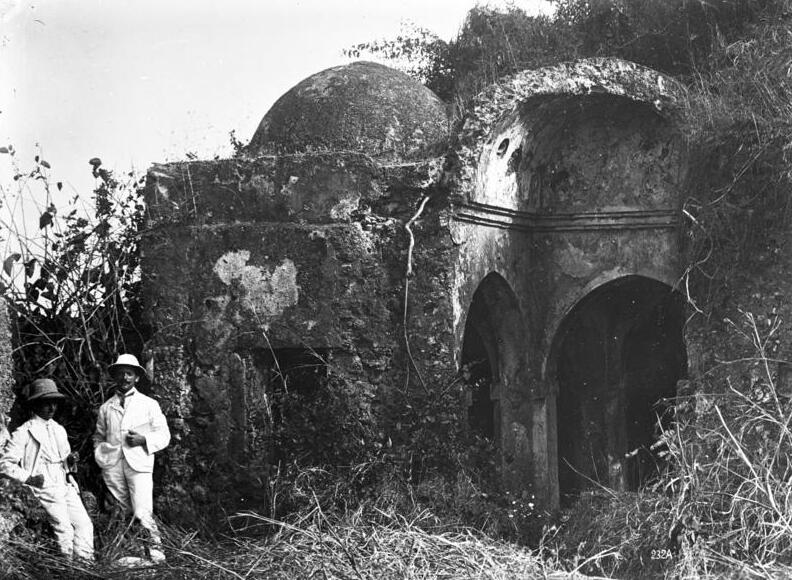
The Great Mosque of Kilwa is one of the earliest surviving mosques in the African Great Lakes.

The earliest evidence of a Muslim presence in the African Great Lakes is the foundation of a mosque in Shanga on Pate Island, where gold, silver and copper coins dating from 830 were found during an excavation in the 1980s. The oldest functioning mosque is the Kizimkazi mosque which dates back to the 11th or early 12th century.

The political history of Islam in the country can be traced to the establishment of the Kilwa Sultanate in the 10th century by Ali ibn al-Hassan Shirazi, a Persian prince of Shiraz. Islam was mainly spread through trade activity along the East African coast and by the 16th century, Islam was firmly established in the region.

Despite Tanzania being home to some of the earliest Muslim outposts in subsaharan Africa, Islam didn't spread into the interior until the 19th century. This is due to the hinterland of the coast being dry and infertile, with the major population and agricultural centres being hundreds of kilometres away around the African Great Lakes. Also, all its needs in terms of foodstuffs, ivory and slaves were met by its immediate hinterland or by local Bantu traders like the Nyamwezi. So there was no incentive to attempt the expensive and risky expedition deep into the interior.

This changed in the 19th century, as the Zanzibar Sultanate unified the small, competing Swahili city states, and strengthened the Islamic practice within them. It also displaced many Muslims who emigrated to the rural mainland. More importantly, in the 19th century, a massive demand for slaves and ivory emerged. Slaves for the Clove plantations on Zanzibar, Pemba and French colonies of Réunion and Mauritius. Ivory due to the rise of western middle classes, with Zanzibari ivory prices doubling between 1826-1857 and then doubling again by 1890. Gum copal also increased in demand.

This meant that the hinterland could no longer supply enough Ivory or Slaves to meet demand. So Muslims began to venture into the interior to the source of these products, to meet the increased demand, as well as to increase Muslim profits by cutting out intermediate traders like the Nyamwezi. The huge Ivory price increase gave enough capital to finance the dangerous journey of the caravans into the interior.

The earliest travelers from the coast into the interior are said to have been two Indian Muslim brothers, Sayan and Musa Muzuri, who departed the coast around 1825 with more than fifteen tons of pearls and textiles that were credited to the account of the Omani liwali of Zanzibar. Sayan died en route; Musa, after suffering a large loss of merchandise, settled for several years in the Lake Victoria region. His business prospered, especially at Tabora and Karagwe, where he appears to have been one of the most successful traders of the mid-nineteenth century.

Tabora and Ujiji were the largest Muslim settlements in the interior. Tabora was located at the nexus of various trade routes, to the west was Lake Tanganyika and Ujiji. To the north was Lake Victoria and Buganda In 1840s Muhammad bin Juma, a trader of mixed Omani and African descent, married a daughter of Fundikira I at Tabora. He the ntemi (ruler or chief) of Unyanyembe, one of the two main chiefdoms of Unyamwezi. Then in the 1860s, an official representative of Sultan "Majid bin Said of Zanzibar" was established there. Though there were tensions as in 1858, a violent conflict broke out between the Arabs and Mnywa Sele, Fundikira's successor. In the 1880s, there were no Nyamwezi living within three miles of Tabora.

Ujiji was much smaller than Tabora until the 1880s, when it reached a population of almost 8,000. It served as the base of expeditions into the Eastern Congo, such as those of Tippu Tip the son of Muhammad bin ]uma, who had settled at Tabora.

But only 65 years after the beginnings of the Muslim push into the interior, the German colony of German East Africa was established. Initially this actually led to the expansion of Islam, as the Germans used Muslims as soldiers, clerks and tax men.

In 1892, the German colonial government established its first educational institutions at the coast (at Tanga, Dar es Salaam, and Lindi), and most of the African administrative staff trained there were coastal Muslims. These junior civil servants are known to have been instrumental in spreading Islam to such places as Mahenge, Kondoa, Irangi, Singida, and Musoma.

In 1891, Tabora became the German military and administrative headquarters in central German East Africa, thereby even increasing its Muslim character, since the numerous government officials who came to Tabora were mostly Muslim. By 1902, its population was thirty thousand, and still growing. In 1911, Becker called Tabora "the citadel of Islam in the interior."

In 1912, the central railway line extended to Tabora. New opportunities for employment were created, and the Nyamwezi of the surrounding hinterland migrated to the town in large numbers and converted to Islam.

Though in the 1905-1907 Maji Maji war, rural Muslim followers of the Qadiriyya tariqa fought against German colonial rule.

But by the time of World War 1, Christian missionary leaders in German East Africa were voicing open criticism of what they saw as the pro-Islamic policy of the German colonial government. In the 1920s the new British colonial Tanganyika territory was a strong supporter of missionary work, and there followed a big expansion of Christian education.

In general, every region that wasn't already thoroughly islamicized converted to Christianity. Christian missions established western style education, and Muslims either avoided them or were excluded. As such, Christians came to have a "privileged position" in society. With the rise of a class of literate Africans, Muslims became less important to the colonial administration, and Muslim communities tended to become marginalized from the modern economic sector. These factors still have effects to this day.

Around the 19th century, trading routes between the Tanzanian interior and the Swahili coast intensified the influence of Swahili culture and religion. Despite the importance of trade, the spread of Islam in the interior was mainly facilitated by Sufi missionaries, converted locals returning from the coast, and Muslim chiefs during the colonial period.

Sufi orders like the Qadiriyya and Shadhiliyya propagated throughout the 19th and early 20th centuries, further consolidating Islam in the interior. During the struggle for Tanzanian independence in the mid-20th century, the Muslims of the nation supported the movement.

== See also ==
- Religion in Tanzania
- Islam in Zanzibar
