= LGBT Voice Tanzania =

LGBTQ rights organization in Tanzania

- Formation: 2009
- Type: Non-governmental organization
- Purpose: LGBT rights, advocacy, health
- Headquarters: Dar es Salaam, Tanzania
- Key people: James Wandera Ouma (Founder)
- Website: https://lgbtvoicetz.org

LGBT Voice Tanzania (sometimes referred to as LGBT Voice) is a Tanzanian non-governmental organization that advocates for the rights of lesbian, gay, bisexual, and transgender (LGBT) people in Tanzania. The organization is known for its work in legal advocacy, health and HIV/AIDS services, and for bringing international attention to the persecution of LGBT people in the country, particularly during the government-led crackdowns starting in 2016.

== History ==
LGBT Voice Tanzania was originally founded in 2009 under the name “WEZESHA” (Swahili for “Empower”) by James Wandera Ouma and a group of LGBT+ activists. In 2013, the organization officially rebranded as LGBT Voice Tanzania. It became one of the few public organizations openly advocating for LGBT rights in a country where same-sex sexual conduct is criminalized.

The organization gained significant international prominence in response to a wave of state-sponsored repression against LGBT people that intensified in 2016.

LGBT Voice Tanzania has been critical of government policies that restrict access to healthcare for LGBT people. In 2016, the government of Tanzania scaled back or shut down numerous health programs and drop-in centres catering to key populations, including men who have sex with men (MSM), claiming they "promoted homosexuality."

=== 2018 Dar es Salaam Crackdown ===
During the anti-gay crackdown in Dar es Salaam in late 2018, the organization warned members of the LGBT community about potential dangers and secured safe shelters for those forced into hiding due to fears of arrest and harassment, After the city's Regional Commissioner, Paul Makonda, announced the formation of a surveillance squad to identify and arrest gay people.

== See also ==
- LGBT rights in Tanzania
- Human rights in Tanzania
- Paul Makonda
