= Human rights in Tanzania =

The issue of human rights in Tanzania, a nation with a 2012 population of 44,928,923, is complex. In its 2026 Freedom in the World report, Freedom House declared the country "Not Free".

== Human rights concerns ==
The United Nations Human Rights Council in October 2011 at its meeting in Geneva completed a Universal Periodic Review (UPR) of the human rights situation in Tanzania. At this UPR, the United Nations Country Team (UNCT) and several countries addressed various problems in Tanzania.

=== Gender equality ===
The UNCT said,

National reviews and assessments of equality between men and women ... have identified a range of challenges ..., which continue to prevail. These include the persistent and increasing burden of poverty on women; inequalities in arrangements for productive activities and access to resources; inequalities in the sharing of power and decision-making; lack of respect for and inadequate promotion and protection of the human rights of women; and inequalities in managing natural resources and safeguarding the environment. ... Particular attention should be drawn to the widespread marginalization of the girl child in different spheres of life, including education, and the total exclusion caused for many by early and forced marriage. ... Gender-based violence is prevalent. According to a 2005 World Health Organization survey, 41 percent of ever-partnered women in Dar es Salaam have experienced physical or sexual violence at the hands of a partner.

Tanzania expressed support for Denmark's recommendation to, "Put in place a comprehensive strategy and effective legislation to eliminate practices that discriminate against women... Tanzania also supported Ghana's recommendation to, "Put in place a comprehensive strategy ... to modify or eliminate cultural practices and stereotypes that discriminate against women...

=== Indigenous peoples ===
The UNCT said,

The rights of indigenous peoples to access ancestral lands have been denied or limited for economic exploitation, in particular in game reserves. ... [T]he Government would be urged to reconsider its policy by which the notion of indigenous peoples is unrecognized and to take steps to ensure their right to practice their own culture in parity with the majority population. The Government should also consider developing human rights-based standard operating procedures for evictions, clearly setting it out as a matter of last resort to resolve disputes over land use between public interests, private investors, and pastoralists.

During the UPR, Finland noted the forceful and unlawful evictions of indigenous people. It also asked Tanzania about its actions to implement the recommendations of the Special Rapporteur on the rights of indigenous peoples and whether the government would take legislative measures to effectively protect the rights of indigenous peoples. Denmark was concerned by the denial or curtailing of indigenous people's rights to ancestral lands, resulting in numerous forced evictions.

=== Same-sex relations ===
The UNCT said,

Homosexuality is considered contrary to cultural norms; same-sex sexual relations are criminalized. Group arrests in connection to peaceful assemblies, non-attendance to HIV patients, as well as forcible evictions of persons due to their sexual orientation by local and religious communities have been reported. Moreover, representatives of the groups and other human rights defenders may not be willing to make public statements in favor of tolerance and decriminalization for fear of reprisals. The Government is urged to take a proactive stance ... and repeal any criminal provision against persons based on their sexual orientation.

During the UPR, Sweden noted that the "criminalization of sexual minorities contributed to the stigmatization and vulnerability of lesbian, gay, bisexual and transgender persons". Slovenia expressed concern that consensual same-sex sexual acts remained criminalized.

=== Workplace discrimination ===
The UNCT said,

Although the Convention on Equal Remuneration ... and the Convention on Discrimination in Employment and Occupation ... have been ratified and domestic laws to their effect have been introduced, the Government has yet to elaborate measures to address wage discrimination and disparities between job values in the private and public sectors. ... [D]espite the Government has put in place the HIV/AIDS (Prevention and Control) Act 2008 and the Employment and Labour Relations (Code of Good Practice) Rules 2007, HIV/AIDS-related discrimination remains institutionalized in the workplace in both the public and private spheres.

=== Commercial sex workers ===
The UNCT said,

Commercial sex workers are another group at risk of social exclusion and harsh treatment by law enforcement. Considered as an offense under applicable criminal law, commercial sex continues to fuel harassment and abuse. The Government is encouraged to study the effects of the arrests of these workers, the majority of whom are women.

=== Albinism ===
The killing and mutilation of people that suffer from albinism continue. Some witch doctors believe the witchcraft to be more powerful if the victim screams during an amputation. Navi Pillay, the United Nations High Commissioner for Human Rights, said in March 2013 that prosecutions for these crimes are rarely successful with only five known cases of convictions out of the 72 murders of people with albinism documented in Tanzania since 2000.

The UNCT said,

From 2006 to 2010, at least 58 persons with albinism were killed, the majority of whom were children. Also, there were nine cases of attempted murder and reports of the desecration of graves. ... Efforts have been made to prosecute the murderers. Tackling the national and international trade in body parts is also essential to ending the killings. In terms of protection, the Government has established special shelter centers for children with albinism. However, in the long-term, this measure results in the children's isolation from society and separation from family. Therefore, the Government should explore alternative ways of protecting people with albinism, including options that promote social inclusion and tolerance.

=== Maternal mortality ===
Maternal mortality is very high in Tanzania. Many of these deaths are related to being provoked by indirect or direct obstetric causes.

The UNCT said,

Maternal health outcomes have shown slow improvement over the past two decades. ... [A]n important recommendation is that the Government increase access to and availability of basic emergency obstetric care services, skilled health workers – currently attending less than 50 percent of live births – as well as supplies. Access to family planning could reduce maternal deaths by a third and child death by as much as 20 percent. ... Also needed is a consideration of the current restrictiveness of safe abortion services, which, under the Penal Code, is considered illegal. Reports suggest that this restrictiveness costs the lives of many women and girls seeking to conduct the act secretly, without professional guidance and under unhygienic conditions.

=== Under-five child mortality ===
The UNCT said,

After more than a decade of stagnation during the 1980s and 1990s, major gains in child survival have been reported since mid-2000. ... This progress is equivalent to saving nearly 100,000 children every year. ... Nonetheless, the toll of under-five deaths still amounts to roughly 155,000 deaths per year – more than 400 deaths in Tanzania every day.

=== Forced labor ===
The UNCT said,

The Local Government (District Authorities) Act (1982) allows the Government to compel individuals and groups to forcibly work for purposes of economic development. Many laws also permit the imposition of forced or compulsory labor as a punishment for a range of offenses, including the expression of political views and the failure to engage in socially useful work. ... These provisions are incompatible with relevant International Labour Organization conventions and the Government should revise these provisions as a matter of priority.

=== Trafficking in persons ===
The UNCT said,

Tanzania is a source, transit, and destination country for men, women, and children subjected to trafficking, specifically under conditions of forced labor and forced prostitution. The incidence of internal trafficking is higher than that of transnational trafficking, largely from rural to urban areas, affecting primarily children for their exploitation in domestic servitude, petty trade, and prostitution. Family members and friends who offer assistance with education or lucrative employment in urban areas usually facilitate trafficking. The use of young girls for forced domestic labor continues to be the country‟s largest human trafficking problem. Due to the lack of establishment of an Anti-Trafficking Committee, the governmental agencies tasked with prevention and protection are unable to implement 2008 Anti-Trafficking in Persons Act as there are no regulations for them to follow. Thus, most government officials remain unfamiliar with the Act's provisions, and no budgetary resources allocated to combating the crime and assisting the victims have been secured... Law enforcement officials often fail to see human trafficking as a crime but rather a moral issue that can be remedied by financial compensation. ... From the enactment of the law to the end of January 2011, three cases were successfully prosecuted...

=== Incarceration, prisons, and access to justice ===
The UNCT said,

There is an acute shortage of courts, as well as judges and magistrates to preside over cases, severely affecting access to competent tribunals. Pointedly, [33.6 percent of] ... cases ... in the primary and district courts ... have been pending for 2 years or more. Likewise, the number of cases pending in the High Court (for murder, serious offenses, and appeals) is rising due to fewer court sittings. Besides, justice is further delayed by prolonged investigations by the police, the courts' adjourning of cases based on flimsy technical grounds, and the non-appearance of witnesses. There is also a dearth of lawyers who are qualified to provide representation in court, the great majority of whom are based in Dar es Salaam. ... While the law allows for legal aid in criminal cases, those accused of murder and treason are provided with free representation in practice only. Detention facilities struggle to cater to the basic needs of the ever-growing number of inmates, most of whom are remandees. Convicted and unconvinced are mixed together, often under inhumane conditions. Some prisons are housing more than twice their capacity, as is the case with the Ruanda Central Prison, which has a capacity of 400 prisoners and holds 838.

In its 2013 human rights report, the United States State Department said,

Despite some improvements, prison conditions remained harsh and life threatening. Inadequate food, overcrowding, poor sanitation, and inadequate medical care were pervasive. There were allegations that authorities meted out inhumane treatment. Serious threats to life continued in detention centers. ... As of October 17, [2013,] the prisons held 34,404 inmates--16 percent above the total capacity of 29,552. Among the prisoners, 17,180 were convicts and 17,224 were pretrial detainees. Pretrial detainees and convicted prisoners were held together. ... Authorities held minors together with adults in several prisons due to a lack of detention facilities. According to government officials, there were deaths in prison due to HIV/AIDS in prisons. The most common health complaints by prisoners were malaria, tuberculosis, HIV/AIDS, and other diseases related to poor sanitation. Prison dispensaries offered only limited treatment, and friends and family members of prisoners generally had to provide medications or the funds to purchase them. Limited transportation also affected the ability of prison staff to take prisoners to health clinics and hospitals. Prison staff complained of water shortages and a lack of electricity as well as inadequate medical supplies. ... Recordkeeping in prisons was inadequate and resulted in discrepancies in reporting. On the mainland[,] the law allows judges and magistrates to grant parole or impose alternative sentences such as community service ..., but these options were rarely used. The law authorizes early release for good behavior but has burdensome evidentiary requirements. On the mainland[,] authorities often moved prisoners to different prisons without notifying their families. ... The number of probation officers remained inadequate. ... On the mainland[,] prisoners were permitted to submit complaints to judicial authorities, but it was alleged that the letters were censored.

Detainees charged with criminal matters generally waited three to four years for trial due to a lack of judges to hear cases, an inadequate judicial budget, and the lengthy time required to complete police investigations.

=== Juvenile justice ===
The UNCT said,

Children are routinely held pre- and post-trial in adult detention centers even in regions in which juvenile detention centers exist. The prisons are not staffed or equipped to provide specialist services, and although generally under-18s or under-21s are separated at night, they mix with adults during the day. There are only two post detention centers and five retention homes (with two more openings in the near future) for under-18s in the country. There is no separate criminal system for under-18s and, apart from one juvenile court in Dar Es Salaam, juvenile cases are heard in regular courts. Under-18s without the means to pay for a lawyer are often left without legal assistance. There is no system of diversion and no community rehabilitation schemes provided for by law, or implemented in practice. Non-custodial sentencing is limited. Boys may receive corporal punishment or stroking. Other punishments relate to fines, compensation or costs, and probation with supervision. Zanzibar equally lacks a separate system for children and, with no separate detention centers, under-18s are mixed with adults in the prison.

In its 2013 human rights report, the United States State Department said,

The [Commission for Human Rights and Good Governance] ... visited a sampling of prisons and detention facilities in 2011 and found 441 minors detained in the adult prisons visited. Among these, 64 were convicted, and the remaining 377 were pretrial detainees. ... There was one prison for minors in the Mbeya Region and five remand homes across the country. Officials attributed the shortage of appropriate detention facilities to a lack of coordination between the judiciary, police, and prison department.

=== Excessive use of force, torture, arbitrary arrests, and corruption ===
During the UPR, the United States expressed concern about reports of arbitrary arrests, excessive use of force by police and the military, and corruption in law enforcement. Denmark was concerned about reports of law enforcement officers engaging in disproportionate use of force, including torture.

Tanzania expressed support for the U.S. recommendations to, "Implement a national action plan to combat corruption, including enhanced laws and enforcement, more resources dedicated to anti-corruption bodies, a review of law enforcement compensation, and a nation-wide educational campaign...." and to provide human rights training to security forces.

In its 2013 human rights report, the United States State Department said,

During the year[,] there were several reports that agents of the government (specifically police and other security units) committed unlawful killings. Nongovernmental organizations (NGOs) and local news agencies documented several cases of police officers mistreating, beating, and causing the deaths of civilians. ... The Legal and Human Rights Center (LHRC) announced that police brutality, domestic violence, and extrajudicial killings rose during [2013].... ... According to the LHRC, by July police and other security personnel killed 22 persons (compared with 31 in all of 2012). In October[,] several members of parliament (MPs) and local NGOs raised concerns about alleged human rights abuses related to a controversial anti-poaching campaign initiated by the government. Some MPs alleged that government officials used excessive force in questioning individuals about poaching activities, seized and killed cattle grazing on protected land, and burned houses of pastoralists allegedly involved in illegal grazing. ... On December 20, President Kikwete dismissed four cabinet ministers ... in response to continued parliamentary concern....

The constitution and law prohibit ... [torture and other cruel, inhuman, or degrading treatment or punishment], but there were reports that police officers, prison guards, and soldiers who abused, threatened, and otherwise mistreated civilians, suspected criminals, and prisoners faced limited accountability. The abuse most commonly involved beatings. ... On June 19, Human Rights Watch and the Wake Up and Step Forward Coalition released a report including several detailed allegations of torture and abuse of lesbian, gay, bisexual, and transgender ... individuals while in police custody. ... The law allows caning. Local government officials and courts occasionally used caning as a punishment for both juvenile and adult offenders. ... Caning and other corporal punishment were also used routinely in schools.

[T]he Tanzanian Police Force has primary responsibility for maintaining law and order both on the mainland and in Zanzibar. ... During ... [2013,] there were reports of excessive force, police corruption, and impunity. Low pay contributed to perceived corruption in certain units, as reported widely by citizens and the press. Newspaper articles, civil complaints, and reports of police corruption from the Prevention and Combating of Corruption Bureau ... as well as the Ministry of Home Affairs, also continued. ... Sungusungu, or citizens' patrols, are traditional neighborhood anticrime groups that exist throughout the mainland. The People’s Militia Act of 1973 grants them the power to make arrests. ... Sungusungu members are not permitted to carry firearms or machetes, but they did carry sticks or clubs. They ... operated independently from the police. ... In June, LHRC reported that Sungusungu militias were responsible for the death of four people during the year in Shinyanga, Mbeya, and Iringa regions.

On the mainland[,] the law ... requires that a person arrested for a crime, other than a national security detainee, be charged before a magistrate within 24 hours of arrest ..., but police failed to comply consistently with this requirement. There were reports of police using a rolling process of releasing and immediately re-arresting individuals so that they would remain in custody while police ... developed the required information for the accused to be charged. The law gives accused persons the right to contact a lawyer or talk with family members, but at times they were denied this right. Prompt access to counsel was often limited by the lack of lawyers in rural areas, lack of communication systems and infrastructure, and illiteracy and poverty of the accused. ... The government provided legal representation for some indigent defendants and all suspects charged with murder or treason. ... In the primary and district courts, bribes sometimes determined whether bail was granted.

=== Justice for survivors of gender-based violence ===
The UNCT said,

Survivors of sexual abuse and violence, struggle to secure justice and social support. The vast majority of police, prosecutors, and magistrates are not trained to meet the needs of survivors. Many officers recommend out of court settlements. Stigma and community pressure often dissuade families from lodging cases, with the community preferring that the case is handled outside the justice system. This often leads to impunity for perpetrators. Since 2008, a system is emerging to improve the reception of survivors and responses to their needs. ... However, continued training and skills development, in conjunction with awareness raising initiatives, is necessary.... For instance, ... only 320 officers of the 35,000-strong police force have received training.

=== Freedom of association, opinion, and expression ===
The UNCT said,

Under commitments made in MKUKUTA II, more efforts to increase access to independent information are underway. Therein, an expansion from the current twelve community media to at least one community media in each district is forecast. To deliver on that commitment, it will be necessary to alleviate the lengthy and bureaucratic procedures in licensing such radio stations, which may take between one to three years. The Government should further be concerned about reports from the independent 2010 general election monitors, which point to instances of intimidation against these radio stations as a means to hinder broadcasting voters' education programs. Another important recommendation for the Government would be the fast-tracking of freedom of information legislation; code of ethics for advertisements; and the introduction of public broadcasting in Zanzibar.

=== Treatment of school pupils ===
The UNCT said,

In 2008, only 0.4 percent of children with disabilities were enrolled and the trend is decreasing. In most cases, these children attend special needs schools rather than enjoying inclusive education. While the Government has developed an Inclusive Education Strategy, immediate efforts should be taken to ensure its implementation and hence increase the inclusion of orphans and other vulnerable children, many of whom are likely to be among the 5 percent of primary age children missing in schools. A 2002 regulation allows for the expulsion of pregnant girls from school. Existing protection and special programs for girls are inadequate and result in many girls being unable to fulfill the compulsory education program in place in the country. Corporal punishment is not prohibited in any environment, including in schools, and its use is widespread. Preliminary results from a forthcoming study on violence against children records high levels of physical violence in school. Over 50 percent of children have been subjected to physical violence – being punched, kicked, slapped, whipped, or threatened with a weapon – by their teachers before the age of 18.

During the UPR, Finland commented on Tanzania's restrictions on the education of persons with disabilities and asked the government about its actions to fully implement the act on persons with disabilities and the strategy on inclusive education.

=== Persons living with HIV/AIDS ===
The UNCT said,

Stereotyping in HIV/AIDS infection has continued fueling stigma and discrimination, particularly against women due to gender norms that label women as "vectors" of transmission for HIV. ... Another contributor to the stigmatization of HIV or AIDS affected individuals is the criminalization of "intentional" transmission of HIV/AIDS, with a punishment of up to ten years. As it is difficult to find out who, among adults, has knowingly infected another person, the added value of this approach is questioned. In addition, with mother to child transmission, it raises an additional concern for women.

== Zanzibar ==
Historically, the human rights situation on Zanzibar has been more problematic than the situation on the mainland. The original constitution of the united republic gave mainland authorities almost no recourse to intervene in matters of law and justice. Mainland officials were thus powerless to stop a wave of arbitrary arrests and imprisonments on the islands. The Zanzibar branch of the Revolutionary Party (known as the Afro-Shirazi Party before merging with the mainland Tanganyika African National Union in 1977) has historically been significantly more authoritarian than its mainland counterpart, a situation that has remained the case even after opposition parties were legalized in 1992.

== Refugees from Burundi ==
After a February 2012 meeting among Tanzania, Burundi, and the United Nations High Commissioner for Refugees (UNHCR), the decision was made to close the Mtabila camp – home to approximately 38,000 Burundian refugees – on 31 December 2012. Tanzania refused to grant citizenship to any of these refugees after having done so for around 160,000 Burundian refugees in 2010.

Following a detailed questionnaire conducted by UNHCR and Tanzanian officials in December 2011, 33,708 refugees in Mtabila were found to be "not in need of international protection" and those who "are unwilling, without justifiable grounds, to return to Burundi, will find themselves liable to be dealt with under relevant Tanzanian laws, including those for immigration control and management". In August 2012, based on screening interviews conducted with UNHCR, only 2,715 of the refugees were determined to remain entitled to refugee status. In November 2012, the UNHCR reported that around 1,000 people per day were being assisted to voluntarily return to Burundi.

Between October 2019 and August 2020, Tanzanian authorities and intelligence services soberly torture and abused at least 18 Burundian refugees and asylum seekers. After the president Pierre Nkurunziza’s decision to run for a disputed third term in 2015, more than 1.5 lakh Burundian refugees live in camps in Tanzania to avoid violence in Burundi.

== Historical Freedom House ratings ==
The following chart shows Tanzania's ratings since 1972 in the Freedom in the World reports, published annually by Freedom House. A rating of 1 is "free"; 7, "not free".^{1}

Historical ratings

Year	Political Rights	Civil Liberties	Status	President^{2}
1972	6	6	Not Free	Julius Nyerere
1973	6	6	Not Free	Julius Nyerere
1974	6	6	Not Free	Julius Nyerere
1975	6	6	Not Free	Julius Nyerere
1976	6	6	Not Free	Julius Nyerere
1977	6	6	Not Free	Julius Nyerere
1978	6	6	Not Free	Julius Nyerere
1979	6	6	Not Free	Julius Nyerere
1980	6	6	Not Free	Julius Nyerere
1981	6	6	Not Free	Julius Nyerere
1982^{3}	6	6	Not Free	Julius Nyerere
1983	6	6	Not Free	Julius Nyerere
1984	6	6	Not Free	Julius Nyerere
1985	6	6	Not Free	Julius Nyerere
1986	6	6	Not Free	Ali Hassan Mwinyi
1987	6	6	Not Free	Ali Hassan Mwinyi
1988	6	6	Not Free	Ali Hassan Mwinyi
1989	6	6	Not Free	Ali Hassan Mwinyi
1990	6	5	Not Free	Ali Hassan Mwinyi
1991	6	5	Not Free	Ali Hassan Mwinyi
1992	6	5	Partly Free	Ali Hassan Mwinyi
1993	6	5	Not Free	Ali Hassan Mwinyi
1994	6	6	Not Free	Ali Hassan Mwinyi
1995	5	5	Partly Free	Ali Hassan Mwinyi
1996	5	5	Partly Free	Benjamin Mkapa
1997	5	5	Partly Free	Benjamin Mkapa
1998	5	4	Partly Free	Benjamin Mkapa
1999	4	4	Partly Free	Benjamin Mkapa
2000	4	4	Partly Free	Benjamin Mkapa
2001	4	4	Partly Free	Benjamin Mkapa
2002	4	3	Partly Free	Benjamin Mkapa
2003	4	3	Partly Free	Benjamin Mkapa
2004	4	3	Partly Free	Benjamin Mkapa
2005	4	3	Partly Free	Benjamin Mkapa
2006	4	3	Partly Free	Jakaya Kikwete
2007	4	3	Partly Free	Jakaya Kikwete
2008	4	3	Partly Free	Jakaya Kikwete
2009	4	3	Partly Free	Jakaya Kikwete
2010	3	3	Partly Free	Jakaya Kikwete
2011	3	3	Partly Free	Jakaya Kikwete
2012	3	3	Partly Free	Jakaya Kikwete
2013	3	3	Partly Free	Jakaya Kikwete
2014	3	3	Partly Free	Jakaya Kikwete
2015	3	4	Partly Free	Jakaya Kikwete
2016	3	4	Partly Free	John Magufuli
2017	4	4	Partly Free	John Magufuli
2018	4	5	Partly Free	John Magufuli
2019	5	5	Partly Free	John Magufuli
2020	5	5	Partly Free	John Magufuli
2021	5	5	Partly Free	Samia Suluhu Hassan
2022	5	5	Partly Free	Samia Suluhu Hassan
2023	5	5	Partly Free	Samia Suluhu Hassan

== International treaties ==
Tanzania's stances on international human rights treaties are as follows:

International treaties
Treaty	Organization	Introduced	Signed	Ratified
Convention on the Prevention and Punishment of the Crime of Genocide	United Nations	1948	—	1984
International Convention on the Elimination of All Forms of Racial Discrimination	United Nations	1966	—	1972
International Covenant on Economic, Social and Cultural Rights	United Nations	1966	—	1976
International Covenant on Civil and Political Rights	United Nations	1966	—	1976
First Optional Protocol to the International Covenant on Civil and Political Rights	United Nations	1966	—	—
Convention on the Non-Applicability of Statutory Limitations to War Crimes and Crimes Against Humanity	United Nations	1968	—	—
International Convention on the Suppression and Punishment of the Crime of Apartheid	United Nations	1973	—	1976
Convention on the Elimination of All Forms of Discrimination against Women	United Nations	1979	1980	1985
Convention against Torture and Other Cruel, Inhuman or Degrading Treatment or Punishment	United Nations	1984	—	—
Convention on the Rights of the Child	United Nations	1989	1990	1991
Second Optional Protocol to the International Covenant on Civil and Political Rights, aiming at the abolition of the death penalty	United Nations	1989	—	—
International Convention on the Protection of the Rights of All Migrant Workers and Members of Their Families	United Nations	1990	—	—
Optional Protocol to the Convention on the Elimination of All Forms of Discrimination against Women	United Nations	1999	—	2006
Optional Protocol to the Convention on the Rights of the Child on the Involvement of Children in Armed Conflict	United Nations	2000	—	2004
Optional Protocol to the Convention on the Rights of the Child on the Sale of Children, Child Prostitution and Child Pornography	United Nations	2000	—	2003
Convention on the Rights of Persons with Disabilities	United Nations	2006	2007	2009
Optional Protocol to the Convention on the Rights of Persons with Disabilities	United Nations	2006	2008	2009
International Convention for the Protection of All Persons from Enforced Disappearance	United Nations	2006	2008	—
Optional Protocol to the International Covenant on Economic, Social and Cultural Rights	United Nations	2008	—	—
Optional Protocol to the Convention on the Rights of the Child on a Communications Procedure	United Nations	2011	—	—

== See also ==
- Human trafficking in Tanzania
- Internet censorship and surveillance in Tanzania
- LGBT rights in Tanzania
- Child labour in Tanzania

== Notes ==
1.Note that the "Year" signifies the "Year covered". Therefore the information for the year marked 2008 is from the report published in 2009, and so on.
2.As of 1 January.
3.The 1982 report covers the year 1981 and the first half of 1982, and the following 1984 report covers the second half of 1982 and the whole of 1983. In the interest of simplicity, these two aberrant "year and a half" reports have been split into three year-long reports through extrapolation.
