= LGBTQ rights in Tanzania =

LGBTQ rights in United Republic of Tanzania
- Tanzania
- Legal status: Illegal since 1864 in Zanzibar; and since 1899 on mainland (as German East Africa)
- Penalty: 30 years to life imprisonment with fines.
- Gender identity: No
- Military: No
- Discrimination protections: Some protections against hate speech based on sexual orientation. Hate crime protections based on sexual orientation.

Family rights
- Recognition of relationships: No recognition of same-sex unions
- Adoption: No

Lesbian, gay, bisexual, transgender, and queer (LGBTQ) people in Tanzania face significant challenges not experienced by non-LGBTQ residents. Homosexuality in Tanzania is a socially taboo topic, and same-sex sexual acts (even in private and consensual) are criminal offences, punishable with life imprisonment. The law also criminalizes heterosexuals who engage in oral sex and anal intercourse. According to the 2007 Pew Global Attitudes Project, 95% (Note: The number of adults surveyed in Tanzania was 704, yielding a margin of error of 4 percent with a 95 percent confidence level.) of Tanzanian residents believed that homosexuality is a way of life that society should not accept, which was the 7th-highest rate of non-acceptance in the 45 countries surveyed. Meanwhile, an Afrobarometer 2020 poll indicated that only 10% of Tanzanians would be tolerant of someone with a different sexual orientation. This was among the lowest in Africa, but higher than the 2007 poll.

In recent years, Tanzania has become particularly hostile to LGBTQ people. In October 2017, it deported staff of several HIV/AIDS groups on the basis of "promoting homosexuality". Tanzania has a high HIV/AIDS rate and reportedly one million people are infected. The Government has increasingly resorted to homophobic rhetoric, alleging that homosexuality is "un-African". In 2018, a so-called "witch hunt" was declared against gay people in Dar es Salaam, where gay men were forced to endure anal examinations and torture. Tanzania has a poor human rights record. Government respect for freedom of speech and freedom of assembly is declining. Despite this, there have been several Tanzanian human rights campaigners, activists, lawyers and feminists like Maria Sarungi Tsehai, Fatma Karume, Mwanahamisi Singano, Carol Ndosi, Zara Kay, Khalifa Said, Goodluck Haule and many others who have openly supported LGBTQ rights whilst openly opposing state-sanctioned homophobia and dangerous rhetoric from government officials who have called for further persecution of these marginalized groups. Promoters of anti-LGBTQ campaigns have included the former president Magufuli, Paul Makonda, Ally Hapi, and Hamisi Kigwangalla.

There are no broad legal protections against discrimination based on sexual orientation or gender identity. However, protections against hate speech and hate crimes based on sexual orientation are in place, starting in 2018 and 2023, respectively.

== History ==
Prior to colonization, various modern-day Tanzanian ethnic groups accepted homosexuality or viewed it with indifference. The Swahili people had traditions of acceptance towards homosexuality. Homosexuals are known as shoga (plural: mashoga), and historically had certain social roles, such as drumming and playing music at marriages and other festivals. The word shoga was also used by women to refer to "friends". Over time, shoga relationships turned into economic relations, with poorer young men being paid by richer older men (basha, plural: mabasha) for sexual relations. Socially, only the mashoga were regarded as "homosexual", the mabasha would usually have a wife.

Mombasa's mashoga are passive male homosexuals offering their persons for money. They advertise themselves in bright tight male attire in public places, usually, but may, when mingling with women at weddings, don women's leso cloths, make-up and jasmine posies. Mashoga have all the liberties of men and are also welcome in many contexts otherwise exclusive to women.

— Gill Shepherd

Lesbians relationships were also commonplace in Swahili society. Lesbians (known as msagaji or msago (plural: wasagaji or misago), literally 'grinders') also had certain societal roles, including doing tasks typically associated with men. Similarly to shoga relationships, msagaji relationships were also defined for economic purposes, though less so. The older partner (mama (plural: mwana)) was typically wealthier and of a higher social class. Women who resisted marriage and were interested in education and careers were perceived as being wasagaji, regardless of their actual sexual orientation. Collectively, homosexuals were called mke-si-mume (literally 'woman, not man'). Among the Maasai people, traditions of cross-dressing were common and typically performed at rituals. During initiation rituals, young male Maasai would often dress as women and wear the surutya (ear-rings worn by women to show that they are married) and other female garments. Among the Kuria people, lesbian marriages were, and still are to some extent, quite commonplace. Though now not perceived as being "homosexual", these marriages are performed for economic and diplomatic purposes, such as when a family has no son. Societal acceptance and tolerance of homosexuality and same-sex relationships quickly disappeared after the arrival of the Europeans. Laws punishing homosexuality were enacted, and over time homophobia has become deeply ingrained in the population. In 2015, Adebisi Ademola Alimi, then a lecturer at the Humboldt University of Berlin, discussed this omnipresent homophobia in, not only Tanzania, but in Africa as a whole.

One factor is the increased popularity of fundamental Christianity, by way of American televangelists, since the 1980s. While Africans [argue] that homosexuality was a western import, they in turn [use] a western religion as the basis for their argument. When I have challenged people who are anti-gay, many have said that it is not our culture. However, when you probe further, they argue that homosexuality is not in the Bible. But the Bible is not our historical culture. This shows there is real confusion about Africa's past.

— Adebisi Ademola Alimi

== Legality of same-sex sexual activity ==
Throughout Tanzania, sex acts between men are illegal and carry a maximum penalty of life imprisonment. Sex acts between women are not mentioned specifically in mainland Tanzanian law. The semi-autonomous region of Zanzibar outlaws same-sex sexual acts between women with a maximum penalty of five years imprisonment or a TSh 500,000/= fine. Heterosexual oral and anal sex is also illegal.

=== Mainland Tanzania ===
The Penal Code of 1945 (as revised by the Sexual Offences Special Provisions Act, 1998) of Human rights in Tanzania provides as follows:

Section 138A. Acts of gross indecency between persons.

- Any person who, in public or private commits, or is a party to the commission of, or procures or attempts to procure the commission by any person of, any act of gross indecency with another person, is guilty of an offence and liable on conviction to imprisonment for a term not less than one year and not exceeding five years or to a fine not less than one hundred thousand and not exceeding three hundred thousand shillings ...

According to Part I(3) of the Sexual Offences Special Provisions Act, 1998, "gross indecency" in Section 138A "means any sexual act that is more than ordinary but falls short of actual intercourse and may include masturbation and indecent physical contact or indecent behaviour without any physical contact".

Section 154. Unnatural offenses.

- (1) Any person who –
  - (a) has carnal knowledge of any person against the order of nature; or [...]
  - (c) permits a male person to have carnal knowledge of him or her against the order of nature,

commits an offence, and is liable to imprisonment for life and in any case to imprisonment for a term of not less than thirty years. ...

Section 155. Attempt to commit unnatural offences.

- Any person who attempts to commit any of the offences specified under section 154 commits an offence and shall on conviction be sentenced to imprisonment for a term not less than twenty years.

Section 157. Indecent practices between males.

- Any male person who, in public or private –
  - (a) commits any act of gross indecency with another male, or
  - (b) procures another male person to commit any act of gross indecency with him, or
  - (c) attempts to procure a male to commit an indecent act to him,

is guilty of an offence and may be sentenced to five years of imprisonment.

=== Zanzibar ===
The Zanzibar Penal Code of 1934, as amended in 2004, provides as follows:

Section 150. and also who

- Any person who:
  - (a) has carnal knowledge of any person against the order of nature; or
  - (b) [...]
  - (c) permits a male person to have carnal knowledge of him or her against the order of nature;

is guilty of a felony, and is liable to imprisonment for a term not exceeding fourteen years.

Section 151.

- Any person who attempts to commit any of the offences specified in section 150 is guilty of a felony, and is liable to imprisonment for a term not exceeding seven years.

Section 153.

- Any woman who commits an act of lesbianism with another woman whether taking an active or passive role shall be guilty of an offence and liable on conviction to imprisonment for a term not exceeding five years or to a fine not exceeding five hundred thousand shillings.

Section 154.

- Any person who, in public or private commits, or is a party to the commission of, or procures or attempts to procure the commission by any person of, any act of gross indecency with another person, is guilty of an offence and liable on conviction to imprisonment for a term not exceeding five years or to a fine not exceeding two hundred thousand shillings ...

According to Section 4, "gross indecency" means "any sexual act that falls short of actual intercourse and may include masturbation and physical contact or indecent behaviour without any physical contact."

Section 158.

- Any person who:
  - (a) enter[s] or arrange[s] a union, whether amounting to marriage or not, of the person of the same sex;
  - (b) celebrate[s] a union with another person of the same sex, whether amounting to marriage or not; [or]
  - (c) lives as husband and wife [with] another person of the same sex;

shall be guilty of an offence and liable on conviction to imprisonment for a term not exceeding seven years.

== Family and relationship policy ==
Same-sex couples have no legal recognition.

A couple is eligible to adopt a child jointly only if the couple is married. A man may adopt a female child as a sole applicant only if "the court is satisfied that there are special circumstances which justify as an exceptional measure the making of an adoption order". There are no special restrictions on a female adopting a male child as a sole applicant. Only a Tanzanian resident who is at least 25 years of age may adopt a child. An LGBTQ person is not specifically prohibited from adopting. "Child" means a person under 21 years of age who has never been married.

=== Family planning ===
The National Family Planning Guidelines and Standards issued in 2013 by the Ministry of Health and Social Welfare, reads: "The Tanzanian Government is fully committed to making family planning services available, accessible, safe, acceptable, and affordable for its people, regardless of age, parity, marital status, creed, race, color, or sexual preference. Several health policies and strategic documents demonstrate this commitment."

Standard 2.5 states that "Before initiating a contraceptive method, the service provider counsels clients to make an informed choice of a family planning method and other reproductive health services, regardless of social status in society." "The service provider: Counsels any woman, man, couple, or young person regardless of age, parity, marital status, creed, race, color, or sexual preference."

== Discrimination protections ==
There is no broad legal protection against discrimination based on sexual orientation or gender identity. Since 2018, there is limited protection against incitement to hatred based on sexual preference. Since 2023, hate crimes protections based on sexual orientation are in place. In addition, some other limited protections are in place:

- Section 8(4)(d) of the Tanzanian Code of Ethics and Conduct for the Public Service, issued in 2005, defines various actions as sexual harassment, such as unwelcome touching, sexual favors, or sexual innuendoes, gestures, noises, jokes, comments or remarks to another person about one's sexuality or body. The Public Service Regulations 2022, maintains the same protection under Section 6(2)(d) of a renewed version of the same code.
- Part II Section 7 of the Nursing and Midwifery (practice) Regulations, 2010 (Government Notice No. 423), states: "A practitioner licensed by the Council shall not withhold or deny nursing care based on age, ancestry, marital status, sex, sexual orientation, race, colour, religious creed, and diagnosis, mental or physical disability."
- Section 11(e) of the Bank of Tanzania (Credit Reference Databank) Regulations 2012, states that a person shall not, for the purpose of credit information sharing, store, share or process information relating to a person’s sexual orientation.
- Section 2.6 of the National Guidelines for Respectful and Compassionate Nursing and Midwifery Care (2017), states: "Non-discriminative care is about providing equitable and fair care to an individual or group regardless of age, disability, sex, race, religious belief, pregnancy, sexual orientation and socioeconomic status."

=== Hate crimes ===
The Tanzania Sentencing Guidelines (2023), issued by the Judiciary of Tanzania, considers killing based on the victim's sexual orientation as a crime of high severity, establishing a minimum sentence of 10 years and a maximum of life imprisonment.

=== Hate speech ===
Section 11(2)(d) of the Electronic and Postal Communications (Radio and Television Broadcasting Content) Regulations 2018 (Government Notice No. 134) states "A licensee shall not broadcast any matter which incites or perpetuates hatred or vilify any person or section of the community on account of race, ethnicity, nationality, gender, sexual preference, age, disability, religion or culture of that person or section of the community." The following amendments maintained this provision.

The Electronic and Postal Communications (Online Content) Regulations issued in 2018 banned hate speech on the basis of sexual orientation. Nevertheless, the Electronic and Postal Communications (Online Content) Regulations issued in 2020 completely repealed the previous regulation.

The Code of Ethics for Media Professionals, issued in 2020 by the Media Council of Tanzania, protects sexual orientation from hate speech, stereotypes and discrimination. It defines hate speech as "Refers to attack a person or a group would receive on the basis of race, religion, gender, sexual orientation, physical appearances, or nationality, and has the potential of inciting hatred, misunderstanding and violence. Likewise hate speech stands for communication intended to degrade, intimidate, or incite violence or prejudicial action against someone based on race, ethnicity, national origin, religion, sexual orientation, or disability of all kind."

- Chapter 1, Section 25.0 on "Social prejudice/Discrimination and hate speech" states "Except where it is strictly relevant to the matter reported and it is in the public interest to do so, practitioners shall avoid discriminatory or denigrator references to people’s race, gender, sex, pregnancy, marital status, ethnic or social origin, colour, sexual orientation, age, disability, religion, conscience, belief, culture, language and birth, HIV status or other status, nor shall they refer to people’s status in a prejudicial or pejorative context."
- Chapter 2, Section 10.0 states "Television programmes should not include excessive violence or scenes of torture in cartoons depicting human characters; neither should they show cartoons that attack people on the grounds of their race, religion beliefs or sexual orientation.

This code shall apply to the following: individual reporters, columnists, cartoonists, broadcasters, photographers, video producers, media managers and editors. Others are media owners, publishers and Online content producers who shall also be bound by this Code of Ethics."

=== Zanzibar ===
Section 9(4) of the Trade Unions Act (2001) protected sexual orientation from discrimination. Nevertheless, the Labour Relations Act No .1 of 2005 repealed this protection.

The Regulations for the Good Practice on HIV and AIDS at the Work Place of 2017 states that the key guiding principles in addressing HIV and AIDS at work places (Section 4) shall be: (10) "All workplace actions shall adhere to gender equality for all women and men by promoting active involvement and empowerment of all workers irrespective of their sexual orientation."

The Program for Advancing Gender Equality in Tanzania issued in 2023 by the Ministry of Community Development, Gender, Elders and Children of The Revolutionary Government of Zanzibar states that “Disadvantaged and vulnerable groups” refer to "persons who may be disproportionately impacted or further disadvantaged by the project(s) compared with other groups due to their vulnerable status (for example, due to age, gender identity, sexual orientation, ethnicity, disability, economic disadvantages, etc.) and may require special engagement efforts to ensure their equal representation in the consultation and decision-making process associated with the project. "

== Living conditions ==
There are no gay bars, although there are some places where gay men meet. Lesbians are less visible than gay men.

=== Discrimination and harassment ===
==== Incidents ====
In November 2018, Paul Makonda, Dar es Salaam's Regional Commissioner, announced that a special committee would seek to identify and punish homosexuals, prostitutes and online fraudsters in the city. A 17-strong committee consisting of police, lawyers and doctors had been formed to identify homosexuals. The committee would scour the internet to identify videos featuring supposedly LGBTQ people. The Foreign Ministry stated that the planned crackdown did not have the support of the Government. Denmark, one of Tanzania's largest aid providers, withheld 65 million kr. (£7.5 million stg; US$9.8 million) over the program. In October 2017, the Government deported staff of HIV/AIDS groups for "promoting homosexuality".

The U.S. Department of State's 2013 Human Rights Report noted:

On June 19, [2013] Human Rights Watch and the Wake Up and Step Forward Coalition released a report including several detailed allegations of torture and abuse of lesbian, gay, bisexual, and transgender (LGBT) individuals while in police custody. For example, the report included a statement from a 19-year-old gay man who was arrested after departing a nightclub in Mbeya. The individual reported police raped and beat him on the soles of his feet with canes, electric wires, and water pipes.

In 2003, over 300 Tanzanians protested against the arrival of a gay tour group. In 2004, several Islamic groups in Zanzibar began an effort to cleanse the nation of activities it considered sinful, including homosexuality. The law in Zanzibar that criminalizes same-sex acts was amended to impose harsher penalties for those activities.

== International reaction ==
=== Universal Periodic Reviews ===
The United Nations Human Rights Council in October 2011 at its meeting in Geneva completed a Universal Periodic Review (UPR) of the human rights situation in Tanzania. At this UPR, Slovenia, Sweden, and the United Nations Country Team (UNCT) publicly urged Tanzania to repeal its statutes that criminalize same-sex sexual activities. The UNCT said in paragraph 27 of its report:

Homosexuality is considered contrary to cultural norms; same sex sexual relations are criminalized. Group arrests in connection with peaceful assemblies, non-attendance to HIV patients, as well as forcible evictions of persons due to their sexual orientation by local and religious communities have been reported. Moreover, representatives of the groups and other human rights defenders may not be willing to make public statements in favor of tolerance and decriminalization for fear of reprisals.

Tanzania refused. Mathias Meinrad Chikawe, the Tanzanian minister of state and good governance, said in Geneva,

There was an issue raised on same-sex marriages, etc. It is true we do not have a law allowing same-sex marriages in our country, and that I say again, due to our own traditions and very cultural strong beliefs. Although activities involving same-sex do take place, but they do take place under cover, so to say, and like I said when I was presenting our report on the ICCPR [International Covenant on Civil and Political Rights], that if one were to exhibit such a behaviour in public, one could be, actually be stoned by the public itself. It is a cultural thing. It's not yet acceptable. So the government ... it would be very strange for the government to propose a law towards allowing that; so, it's just that maybe time has not come for us to consider such freedoms in our country.

=== Aid from the UK ===
In October 2011, at the Commonwealth Head of Government's meeting in Perth, Australia, the prime minister of the United Kingdom, David Cameron, said that the UK may withhold or reduce aid to governments that do not reform statutes criminalizing homosexuality. In response, Tanzania's minister for foreign affairs and international cooperation, Bernard Membe, said,

Tanzania will never accept Cameron's proposal because we have our own moral values. Homosexuality is not part of our culture and we will never legalise it. ... We are not ready to allow any rich nation to give us aid based on unacceptable conditions simply because we are poor. If we are denied aid by one country, it will not affect the economic status of this nation and we can do without UK aid.

In the Tanzanian Parliament on 11 November 2011, the Tanzanian prime minister, Mizengo Pinda, responded to a question from an MP about whether the Government was prepared to lose aid from the UK. He said:

You are not being fair to me as the government has already made its stand clear on the matter ... but since you want to get my opinion, I would like to say that homosexuality is unacceptable to our society. We need to look critically on these issues. To me this is unacceptable. Even animals can't do such a thing.

His statement is biologically and scientifically counterfactual, as homosexuality has been observed among thousands of animal species, including Tanzania's national animal, the giraffe. Males of the species, especially, engage in high levels of same-sex sexual behavior, with up to 94 percent of all acts of "mounting", being male-male. In the Tanzanian Parliament on 20 June 2012, Membe responded to a question from MP Khatib Said Haji, about the position of the government on the pressure by Western countries demanding abolition of anti-gay laws. Membe said: "We are ready to lose aid and support from friendly countries that are now pushing for repeal of anti-gay laws in African nations" and that Tanzania was ready to go it alone rather than being subjected to humiliation and dehumanization.

== Summary table ==
Same-sex sexual activity legal	No (Penalty: 30 years to life imprisonment.)
Equal age of consent	No
Anti-discrimination laws in employment only	No
Anti-discrimination laws in the provision of goods and services	No
Anti-discrimination laws in all other areas (Incl. indirect discrimination, hate speech)	Yes / No (Some protections from hate speech based on sexual orientation)
Hate crimes protection including sexual orientation	Yes (Since 2023)
Same-sex marriages	No
Recognition of same-sex couples	No
Stepchild adoption by same-sex couples	No
Joint adoption by same-sex couples	No
LGBTQ people allowed to serve openly in the military	No
Right to change legal gender	No
Access to IVF for lesbians	No
Commercial surrogacy for gay male couples	No
MSMs allowed to donate blood	No

== See also ==
- Human rights in Tanzania
- LGBTQ rights in Africa
