= Makonda =

Makonda is a surname. Notable people with the surname include:

- Paul Makonda (born 1982), Tanzanian politician
- Tripy Makonda (born 1990), French football player
