= Human trafficking in Tanzania =

Tanzania ratified the 2000 UN TIP Protocol in May 2006.

In 2008, the Government of Tanzania did not fully comply with the minimum standards for the elimination of trafficking; however, it made significant efforts to do so.

In 2014, Tanzania was a source, transit, and destination country for men, women, and children trafficked for the purposes of forced labor and sexual exploitation. Boys were trafficked within the country for forced labor on farms, in mines, and in the informal business sector. Tanzanian girls from rural areas were trafficked to urban centers and the island of Zanzibar for domestic servitude and commercial sexual exploitation; some domestic workers fleeing abusive employers fall prey to forced prostitution. In some regions, unregistered employment agencies were involved in recruiting minors from rural areas to work as domestic helpers in the capital, where they are subject to exploitation. Tanzanian children and adults were reportedly trafficked to other countries including Mozambique, Uganda, Kenya, South Africa, Ethiopia, Yemen, Oman, the United Arab Emirates, Saudi Arabia, Pakistan, the United Kingdom, the United States, France, Italy and China. Trafficked children from Burundi and Kenya, as well as adults from Bangladesh, India, Nepal and Yemen, are trafficked for forced labor in Tanzania's mining, agricultural and domestic service sectors, and are sometimes also subjected to sex trafficking.

U.S. State Department's Office to Monitor and Combat Trafficking in Persons placed the country in "Tier 2" in 2017 and 2023

== Prosecution (2008) ==
Tanzania's anti-trafficking law enforcement efforts improved significantly last year as a result of new training of police, unprecedented government funding of the police's Anti-Human Trafficking Unit, and increased awareness of trafficking among Tanzania's law enforcement community. Tanzanian law does not prohibit all forms of trafficking in persons, and Zanzibar has a separate legal code from the mainland of Tanzania. On the mainland, traffickers can be prosecuted under existing statutes criminalizing the sale of people, forced labor, child labor, and various sexual offenses. On Zanzibar, traffickers can be prosecuted under the Penal Act that criminalizes kidnapping, abduction, and slavery. Following a six-month period for Zanzibar to comment on draft national anti-trafficking legislation, Tanzania's Cabinet approved the bill in mid-January 2008 and introduced it for a first reading to the Parliament two weeks later. The bill was then moved to a committee for discussion and editing, with a Parliamentary vote expected before the end of 2008. Using existing laws, the government actively investigated cases of trafficking during the reporting period; however, there were no known prosecutions or convictions.

The Anti-Human Trafficking Unit investigated all trafficking leads reported to police by the public or other law enforcement authorities. The accused was released on bail while the investigation continues. In addition, the unit continued an investigation into a Zanzibari brothel marketing children via the Internet; this type of cyber-crime is new in Tanzania and police are seeking training in how to investigate these crimes.

The Tanzanian police also collaborated with Interpol to locate a suspected Tanzanian trafficking victim in South Africa using newly acquired cell phone technology. An April 2007 foreign government-sponsored "training of trainers" program for 18 police and immigration officials in Zanzibar launched the Zanzibari Government's specialized anti-trafficking training program. This resulted in the Zanzibari government's June 2007 co-training, with a U.S. anti-trafficking expert, of 22 immigration officials. On the mainland, 332 law enforcement officials received specific anti-trafficking training in 2007. Involvement in, or tolerance of, trafficking by low-level immigration officials is suspected, but not proven.

== Protection (2008) ==
The government's efforts to protect victims of trafficking during the reporting period were notable, though it continued to suffer from a lack of resources. Government officials regularly relied on three NGOs to provide shelter, counseling, and rehabilitation for victims of trafficking. Government authorities referred trafficking victims to these NGOs in regions where victim assistance was available. For instance, in the second quarter of 2007, one NGO shelter received 23 female trafficking victims; 17 were referred by police and one by a social worker. In January 2008, the Anti-Human Trafficking Unit changed its policy of requiring trafficking victims to go to a police station to make a statement; now a plain-clothes female police officer visits shelters to obtain sex trafficking victims' statements in a more private setting. The Unit also hired a female police sergeant to better facilitate its interactions with female victims.

A 24-hour crime hotline staffed by Tanzania police officers is available for citizens to make anonymous reports about suspected trafficking victims. While still severely constrained by lack of funding, the Ministry of Labor budgeted approximately $60,000 to its Labor Administration and Inspection Services for child labor inspections. In 2007, the Ministry of Labor withdrew nearly 1,100 victims from forced child labor situations, most of whom were provided the opportunity to compensate for their missed education by enrolling in one the Ministry of Education's 305 Community Learning Centers. The government generally encourages victims' assistance in the investigation and prosecution of their traffickers, but the lack of national procedures for victim protection likely led to the deportation of most foreign victims before they were identified or able to give evidence in court. Foreign victims are not offered legal alternatives to their removal to countries in which they would face hardship or retribution. In a few cases, the lack of adequate shelter facilities forced Tanzanian officials to house potential trafficking victims in prisons.

== Prevention (2008) ==
Political will to address human trafficking in Tanzania increased significantly during the reporting period, resulting in additional concrete prevention efforts. President Kikwete's personal commitment to combat trafficking accelerated the drafting of anti-trafficking legislation and law enforcement training. Staff of the Anti-Human Trafficking Unit appeared in radio and TV spots and distributed booklets about human trafficking; these awareness raising efforts resulted in a significant increase in the number of leads received by the unit during the last six months of 2007. The Ministry of Health's National AIDS Control Program conducted a half-day training of trainers session on human trafficking for 41 healthcare coordinators from 21 regions; these trainers then provided training to healthcare workers in their regions. Tanzanian nationals receive human rights training, including sessions on gender and women's rights, the protection of civilians, and international humanitarian law, before their deployment as part of international peacekeeping missions.

== See also ==
- Child labour in Tanzania
