= Fatma Karume =

Tanzanian lawyer and activist

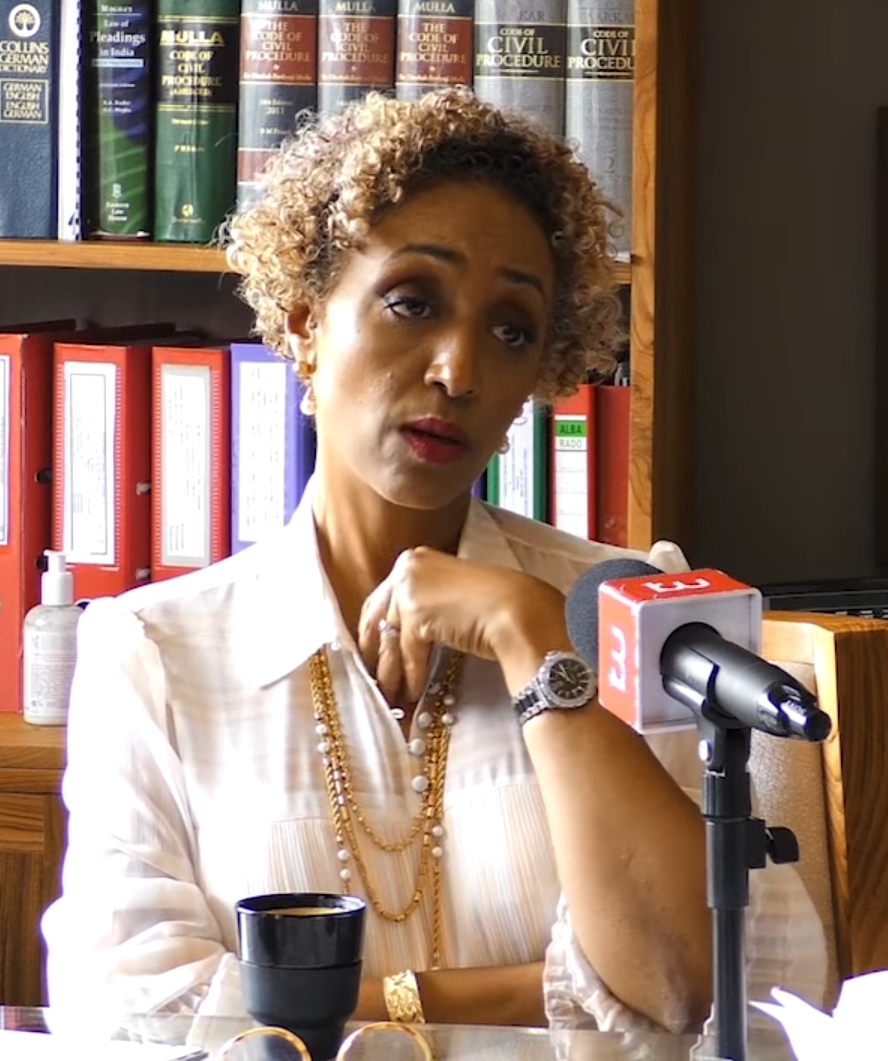
- Fatma Karume speaking on Kwanza TV
- Occupations: Lawyer; Activist
- Known for: Constitutional law, human rights advocacy, former President of the Tanganyika Law Society
- Parent: Amani Abeid Karume (father)
- Relatives: Abeid Karume (grandfather)

Fatima Karume (born 15 June 1969) is a Tanzanian lawyer and activist who served as the president of Tanganyika Law Society (TLS) from 2018 to 2019. She was disbarred by the High Court of Tanzania in 2020 following a dispute.

== Early Life and family background ==
Fatma Karume was born in 1969 into the family of Karume, one of East Africa's most influential political dynasties. Her grandfather, Abeid Amani Karume, was a leader of the Zanzibar Revolution and served as the first President of Zanzibar from 1964 until his assassination in 1972. Her father, Amani Abeid Karume, also served as the President of Zanzibar for two terms from 2000 to 2010. She succeeded her predecessor, Tundu Lissu, who led the society from 2017 to 2018.

In 2020 she was disbarred as a lawyer by the High Court of Tanzania. This followed a letter that she wrote which was alleged to have disrespected the Attorney General. The year long dispute was criticised for its lack of due procedure by Lawyers for Lawyers. A letter of support by the Tanzania Human Rights Defenders Coalition was echoed by African Defenders questioned the disbarment being permanent.

She was allowed to again practice law in Tanzania in 2025 but the decision was challenged by the government.
