= Child labour in Tanzania =

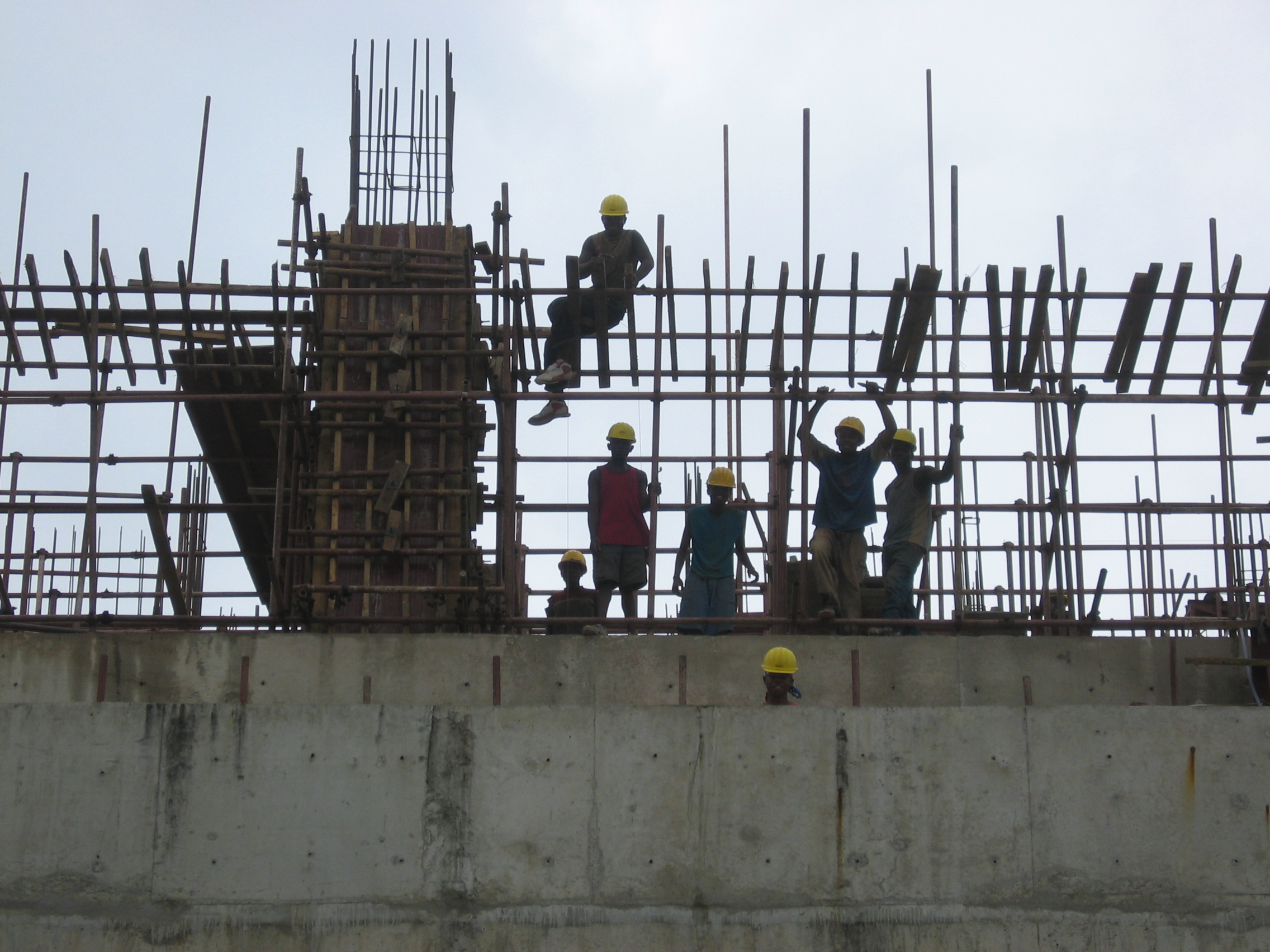
Children and teens working on a building yard in Dar Es Salaam, 2006

Child labour is common in Tanzania with millions working. It is more common with girls rather than boys. Girls are commonly employed as domestic servants, sometimes by force. Poor children in particular are trafficked internally for commercial sexual exploitation. Tanzania ratified the Convention on the Rights of the Child in 1991 and the African Charter on the Rights and Welfare of the Child in 2003. Tanzania then enacted the Law of the Child Act, 2009. To help implement that Act and provide a mechanism for the reporting of children's rights violations, a free-of-charge helpline is available throughout the country.

In 2013, the U.S. Department of Labor reported in its Findings on the Worst Forms of Child Labor study that 25% of children aged 5 to 14 are working children. This percentage corresponds to around 3.1 million children. According to the report, despite the Government's moderate advancement in eliminating child labor, children in Tanzania still engage in agricultural and mining activities as indentured labourers. In December 2014, an ILAB List of Goods Produced by Child Labor or Forced Labor reported 8 goods produced in such working conditions in Tanzania, 6 of them are agricultural goods (most importantly coffee, sisal, tea and tobacco). The remaining items are gold and tanzanite.
