= Paul Makonda =

Tanzanian politician

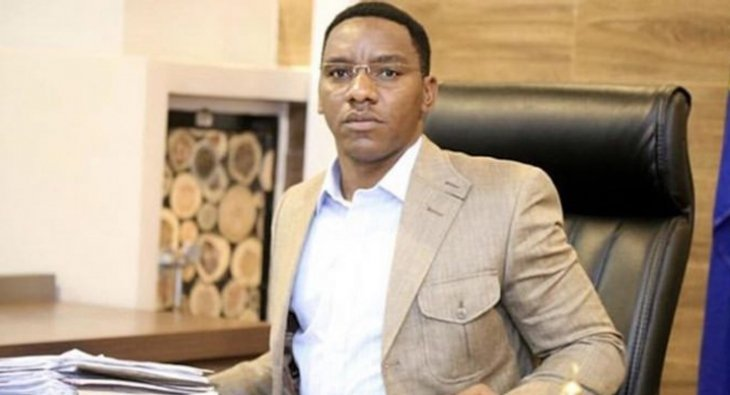

Ministry of Information, Culture, Arts and Sports
- Incumbent
- Assumed office 17 November 2025
- President: Samia Suluhu Hassan

Member of Parliament for Arusha
- Incumbent
- Assumed office 2025

Commissioner of Arusha
- In office April 2024 – 2025
- Appointed by: Samia Suluhu Hassan
- Preceded by: John Mongela
- Succeeded by: Amos Makalla

CCM Spokesperson
- Incumbent
- Assumed office 22 October 2023
- Appointed by: Chama Cha Mapinduzi
- Preceded by: Sophia Mjema

CCM Secretary for Ideology and Publicity
- Incumbent
- Assumed office 22 October 2023
- Appointed by: Chama Cha Mapinduzi
- Preceded by: Sophia Mjema

Regional Commissioner of Dar es Salaam
- In office 14 March 2016 – 15 July 2020
- Appointed by: John Magufuli
- Preceded by: Mecky Sadick
- Succeeded by: Abubakar Kunenge

Personal details
- Born: Paul Christian Makonda; 15 February 1982 (age 44) Mwanza Region, Tanzania
- Party: Chama Cha Mapinduzi
- Education: Moshi Co-operative University; Mzumbe University

Paul Christian Makonda /pɔːl//krɪstjən//məkɒndə/// (born 15 February 1982) is the former Regional Commissioner of Arusha, Tanzania. Who is currently member of parliament for Arusha.

== Professional life ==
Makonda is a Tanzanian politician who has held various leadership roles. He holds a bachelor's degree in economics and community development and a postgraduate diploma in leadership.

Throughout his career, he has focused on improving public services and fostering development. He has been involved in several projects to build educational facilities and improve healthcare services.

His notable positions include serving as the President of the Tanzania Higher Learning Institutions Students Organization (TAHLISO), a member of the Constituent Assembly, and the District Commissioner of Kinondoni.

Makonda gained popularity during a constitutional amendment referendum, where he was among a few members of a special parliamentary session that was tasked with drafting a new Constitution. He would later become more prominent in politics, first acting as the District Commissioner (DC) for Kinondoni before being appointed Regional Commissioner (RC) of Dar es Salaam by President John Magufuli in 2016.

In 2017, Makonda waged a campaign against the LGBTQ community in Dar es Salaam, an act that was condemned by human rights groups.

During the height of the COVID-19 pandemic in Tanzania, Makonda believed the disease had been eradicated through national prayer echoing the rhetoric of Magufuli despite all evidence suggesting the contrary.

In 2024 Makonda was appointed Regional Commissioner for Arusha region by President Samia Suluhu Hassan.

== Sanctions ==
In a press statement issued by U.S. Secretary of State Mike Pompeo on 31 January 2020, Makonda was assigned a public designation and barred from entering the United States due to "his involvement in gross violations of human rights, which include the flagrant denial of the right to life, liberty, or the security of persons". The statement also stated that the US had credible information that Makonda was "implicated in oppression of the political opposition, crackdowns on freedom of expression and association, and the targeting of marginalized individuals". The designation also applied to his wife, Mary Felix Massenge.
