= Mkange =

Ward in Chalinze District, Pwani Region

Mkange Kata ya Mkange (Swahili)
- Ward
- Kata ya Mkange, Wilaya ya Chalinze
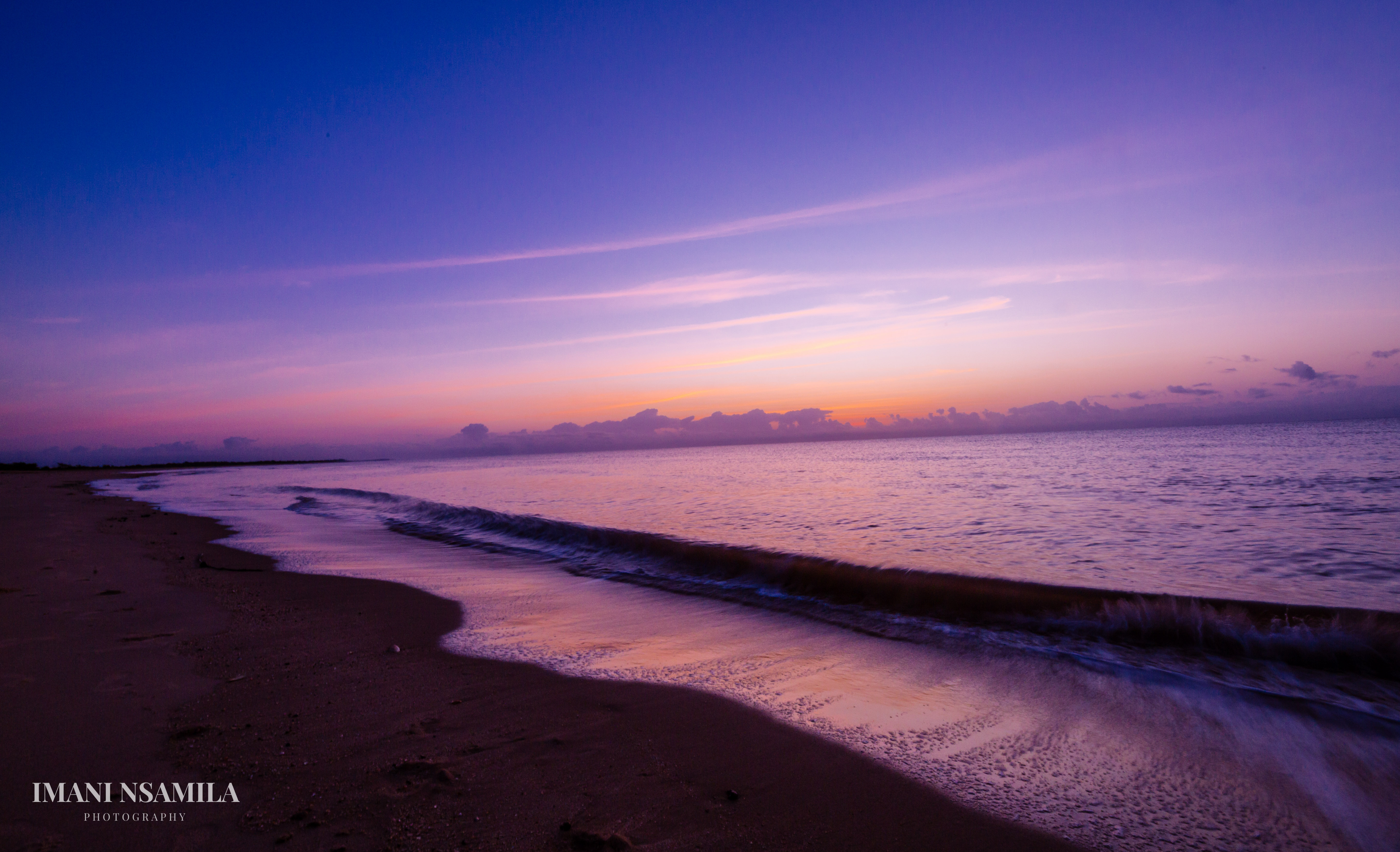
- Saadani Park Sunrise
- Nickname: Saadani's rivers ward
- Location within Tanzania
- Country: Tanzania
- Region: Pwani Region
- District: Chalinze District

Area
  - Total: 939.5 km^{2} (362.7 sq mi)
- Elevation: 250 m (820 ft)

Population (2012)
  - Total: 12,026
  - Density: 12.80/km^{2} (33.15/sq mi)

Ethnic groups
  - Settler: Swahili
  - Native: Doe & Kwere
- Tanzanian Postal Code: 61322

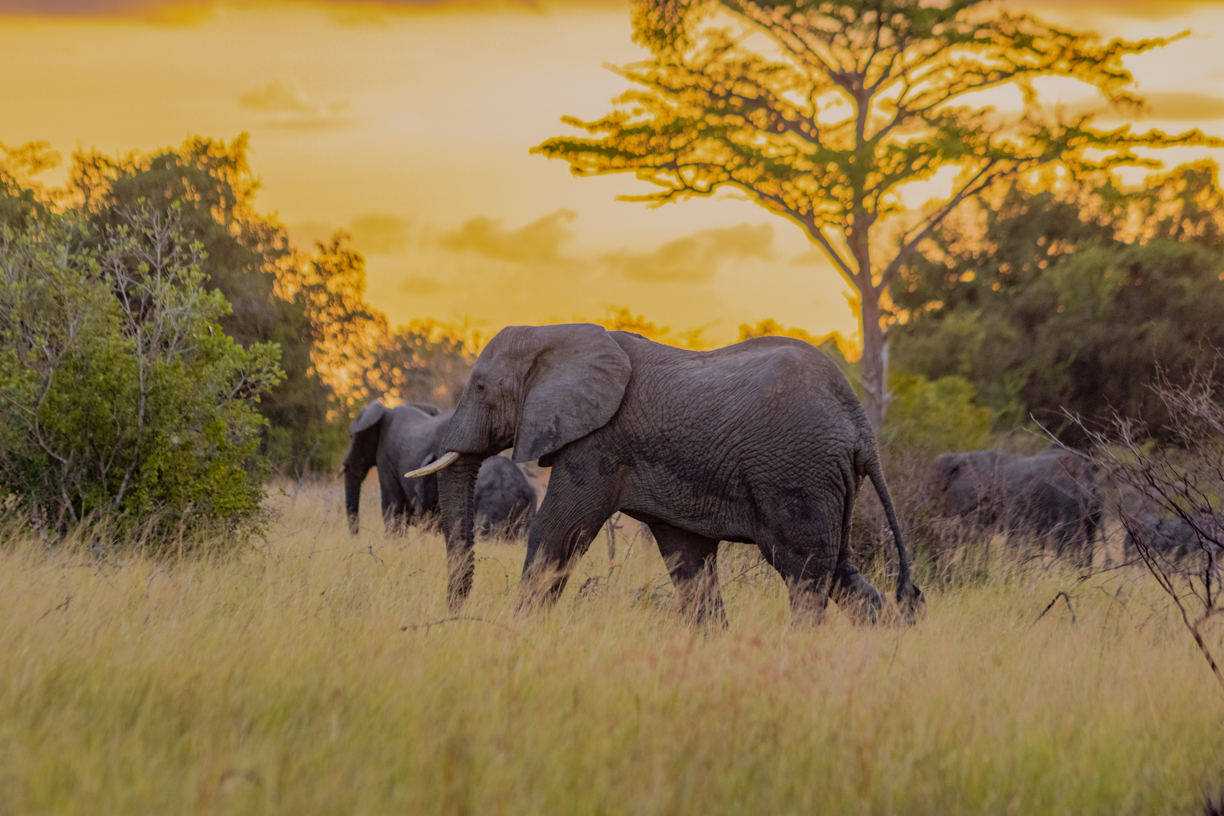
Elephant - Saadani National Park 4

Mkange is an administrative ward in Chalinze District of Pwani Region in Tanzania. The ward covers an area of 939.5 km^{2} (362.7 sq mi), and has an average elevation of 250 m (820 ft). The ward is bordered by Pangani District to the north east and by Handeni District to the north west. Miono ward borders the ward directly to the west, and in the south the ward is bordered by Bagamoyo District. The eastern half of the ward is boarded by the Indian Ocean.

According to the 2012 census, the ward has a total population of 12,026. Mkange ward is the largest ward in Chalinze District and is also home to Saadani National Park, which covers the entire Chalinze coast, meaning Chalinze District has no direct access to the ocean. The Ward is also where the north half of the Wami River delta is located. Mkange ward is also where the Wami river also divides the border between Chalinze District and Bagamoyo District.
