= Msata =

Ward in Chalinze District, Pwani Region

Msata Kata ya Msata (Swahili)
- Ward and Town
- Kata ya Msata, Wilaya ya Chalinze
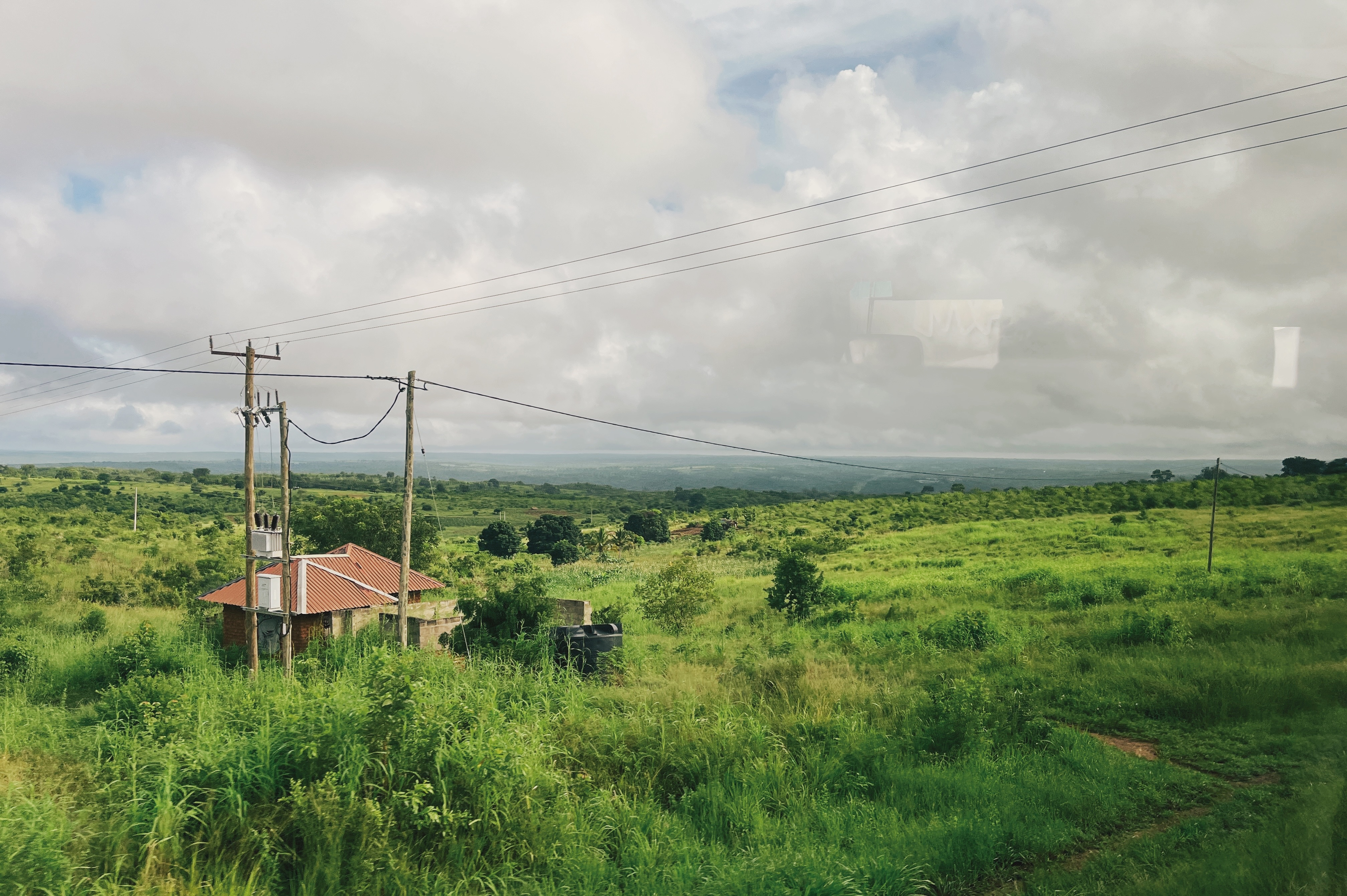
- Farmhouse in Msata Ward, Chalinze District, Pwani
- Nickname: Powerhouse of Northern Pwani
- Location within Tanzania
- Country: Tanzania
- Region: Pwani Region
- District: Chalinze District

Area
  - Total: 757.8 km^{2} (292.6 sq mi)
- Elevation: 234 m (768 ft)

Population (2012)
  - Total: 13,740
  - Density: 18.13/km^{2} (46.96/sq mi)

Ethnic groups
  - Settler: Swahili
  - Native: Doe & Kwere
- Tanzanian Postal Code: 61310

Msata is an administrative ward and town in Chalinze District of Pwani Region in Tanzania. The ward covers an area of 757.8 km^{2} (292.6 sq mi), and has an average elevation of 234 m (768 ft). According to the 2012 census, the ward has a total population of 13,740.
