= Talawanda =

Ward in Chalinze District, Pwani Region

Talawanda Kata ya Talawanda (Swahili)
- Ward
- Kata ya Talawanda, Wilaya ya Chalinze
- Location within Tanzania
- Country: Tanzania
- Region: Pwani Region
- District: Chalinze District

Area
  - Total: 358 km^{2} (138 sq mi)
- Elevation: 131 m (430 ft)

Population (2012)
  - Total: 9,229
  - Density: 25.8/km^{2} (66.8/sq mi)

Ethnic groups
  - Settler: Swahili
  - Native: Zaramo & Kwere
- Tanzanian Postal Code: 61313

Talawanda is an administrative ward in Chalinze District of Pwani Region in Tanzania. The ward covers an area of 358 km^{2} (138 sq mi), and has an average elevation of 131 m (430 ft). According to the 2012 census, the ward has a total population of 9,229.
