= Mandera, Pwani =

Ward in Chalinze District, Pwani Region

Mandera Kata ya Mandera (Swahili)
- Ward
- Kata ya Mandera, Wilaya ya Chalinze
- Location within Tanzania
- Country: Tanzania
- Region: Pwani Region
- District: Chalinze District

Area
  - Total: 164.7 km^{2} (63.6 sq mi)
- Elevation: 250 m (820 ft)

Population (2012)
  - Total: 9,365
  - Density: 56.86/km^{2} (147.3/sq mi)

Ethnic groups
  - Settler: Swahili
  - Native: Doe & Kwere
- Tanzanian Postal Code: 61317

Mandera is an administrative ward in Chalinze District of Pwani Region in Tanzania. The ward covers an area of 164.7 km^{2} (63.6 sq mi), and has an average elevation of 250 m (820 ft). According to the 2012 census, the ward has a total population of 9,365.
