= Pera, Pwani =

Ward in Chalinze District, Pwani Region

Pera Kata ya Pera (Swahili)
- Ward
- Kata ya Pera, Wilaya ya Chalinze
- Location within Tanzania
- Country: Tanzania
- Region: Pwani Region
- District: Chalinze District

Area
  - Total: 298.4 km^{2} (115.2 sq mi)
- Elevation: 188 m (617 ft)

Population (2012)
  - Total: 12,701
  - Density: 42.56/km^{2} (110.2/sq mi)

Ethnic groups
  - Settler: Swahili
  - Native: Zaramo & Kwere
- Tanzanian Postal Code: 61314

Pera is an administrative ward in Chalinze District of Pwani Region in Tanzania. The ward covers an area of 298.4 km^{2} (115.2 sq mi), and has an average elevation of 188 m (617 ft). According to the 2012 census, the ward has a total population of 12,701.
