= WIPAHS =

World Islamic Propagation and Humanitarian Services (WIPAHS)
- Formation: Ramadhan, 1984
- Location: Tanzania
- Chief Executive Officer: Jabir Rajani
- Website: WIPAHS

WIPAHS (World Islamic Propagation and Humanitarian Services) is an independent non governmental organization (NGO), registered as a charitable humanitarian trust in Tanzania.

== History ==
In the month of Ramadhan 1984, a group of friends got together with the sole purpose of improving the well-being of the local community.

This group of friends began work by distributing Islamic books, Qur'ans and learning aids to local schools and Madrasahs. The local population lived in poverty and access to many areas proved difficult. It was also very difficult for the local people to have access to clean water.

This observation inspired the idea of digging wells in remote areas, especially near mosques, Madrasahs, schools, and populated villages.

The members were also forced to review their activities and decided to give special attention to the aspect of education and women. This led to the initiation of the Wali Ul Asr Education Centre (WEC).

== Objectives ==
- Propagating the message of peace through the teachings of Islam.
- Eradicating Poverty through education.
- Helping to fight diseases and malnutrition through "Give Water to the Thirsty Projects"
- Economic upliftment of the under-privileged through sponsoring and initiating economic programmes, thus creating self-sustaining individuals in the country.

== Projects ==
=== Water Program ===
Wipahs has dug more than 800 shallow wells in various remote areas like Bagamoyo District, Pwani, Mkuranga District, Pwani, Temeke District, Dar es Salaam, sw:Mwarusembe, sw:Kilwa Masoko, sw:Magomeni, sw:Kibada (Dar es Salaam). Each well can sustain up to 400 heads.

This shallow well project is carried out under the Give water to the thirsty Project.

=== Education ===
Under the Wali-Ul-Asr Education Centre (WEC), WIPAHS has built several learning institutions. They are:

- Umme Abiha Nursery School (UANS)
- Kibaha English Medium Primary School (KEMPS)
- Wali Ul Asr Girls Seminary (WGS)
- Wali Ul Asr Boys Seminary (WBS)
- Coast Teachers Training College (CTTC)
- A³ Institute of Professional Studies
- Department of Nursing, Allied Sciences and Mid-Wifery
- A³ Institute of Journalism
- Muslim Teachers Training College (MTTC)

== See also ==
Al Itrah Broadcasting Network Television
