= Doe language =

Bantu language of Tanzania

Doe
- Native to: Tanzania
- Native speakers: 10,000 (2017)
- Language family: Niger–Congo?: Atlantic–Congo; Benue–Congo; Bantoid; Bantu; Northeast Bantu; Northeast Coast Bantu; Ruvu (G30+G10); Doe

Language codes
- ISO 639-3: doe
- Glottolog: doee1238
- Guthrie code: G.301
- ELP: Doe

Doe (Dohe) is a Bantu language of the Pwani region of Tanzania.

== See also ==
- Doe people
