= Bwilingu =

Ward in Chalinze District, Pwani Region

Bwilingu Kata na mji wa Bwilingu (Swahili)
- Ward and Town
- Kata na mji wa Bwilingu, Wilaya ya Chalinze
- Location within Tanzania
- Country: Tanzania
- Region: Pwani Region
- District: Chalinze District

Area
  - Total: 84 km^{2} (32 sq mi)
- Elevation: 237 m (778 ft)

Population (2012)
  - Total: 35,149
  - Density: 420/km^{2} (1,100/sq mi)

Ethnic groups
  - Settler: Swahili
  - Native: Zaramo
- Tanzanian Postal Code: 61315

Bwilingu is an administrative ward and capital of Chalinze District in Pwani Region of Tanzania. The ward covers an area of 84.6 km^{2} (32.7 sq mi), and has an average elevation of 237 m (778 ft). According to the 2012 census, the ward has a total population of 35,149.
