= Msoga =

- Village
- Location within Tanzania
- Coordinates: 6°34′S 38°18′E
- Country: Tanzania
- Region: Pwani
- District: Chalinze District

Population (2012)
  - Total: 10,144
- Time zone: UTC+3 (EAT)
  - Summer (DST): UTC+3 (not observed)
- Postcode: 61312
- Website: www.tanzania.go.tz

Msoga is a village in the Coast Region, Chalinze District in Tanzania. It is located few kilometers north of Chalinze on the Dar es Salaam - Arusha road. This village is the domicile of the former President of the United Republic of Tanzania, Jakaya Mrisho Kikwete. It contains a quality hospital Msoga district hospital and proper quality roads.

== Economy ==
Like in other villages of Tanzania, most of the residents of Msoga are farmers and few keep animals like cattle, goats and poultry. The most important crops are maize, paddy, cassava and sweet potatoes. Various vegetables are also produced including Mchicha, cabbage and various traditional vegetables.

In December 2009 the local community bank was promised support with capital and knowledge from CRDB Bank.

== Infrastructure ==
Like many villages along the said highway, Msoga is experiencing transformation to a modern life. This is mainly attributed to the availability of many services that were not available some decades ago. These include the surfaced road, potable water, a small dam and communication through cell-phones. Msoga is an example of the transformation process that is being experienced repeatedly in thousands of Tanzania villages.
