= Mandera (disambiguation) =

Mandera is the capital and largest town of Mandera County, Kenya

Mandera may also refer to:

- Mandera County, Kenya
- Mandera (Somaliland), a town
- Mandera, Pwani, a ward in Chalinze District, Pwani Region, Tanzania
