= Pwani =

Pwani means "Coast" in Swahili. It may refer to:

- Pwani Province, Kenya
- Pwani Region, Tanzania
- Pwani (village), village in Zanzibar, Tanzania
