= Chalinze District =

District of Pwani Region, Tanzania

Chalinze District Wilaya ya Chalinze (Swahili)
- District of Pwani
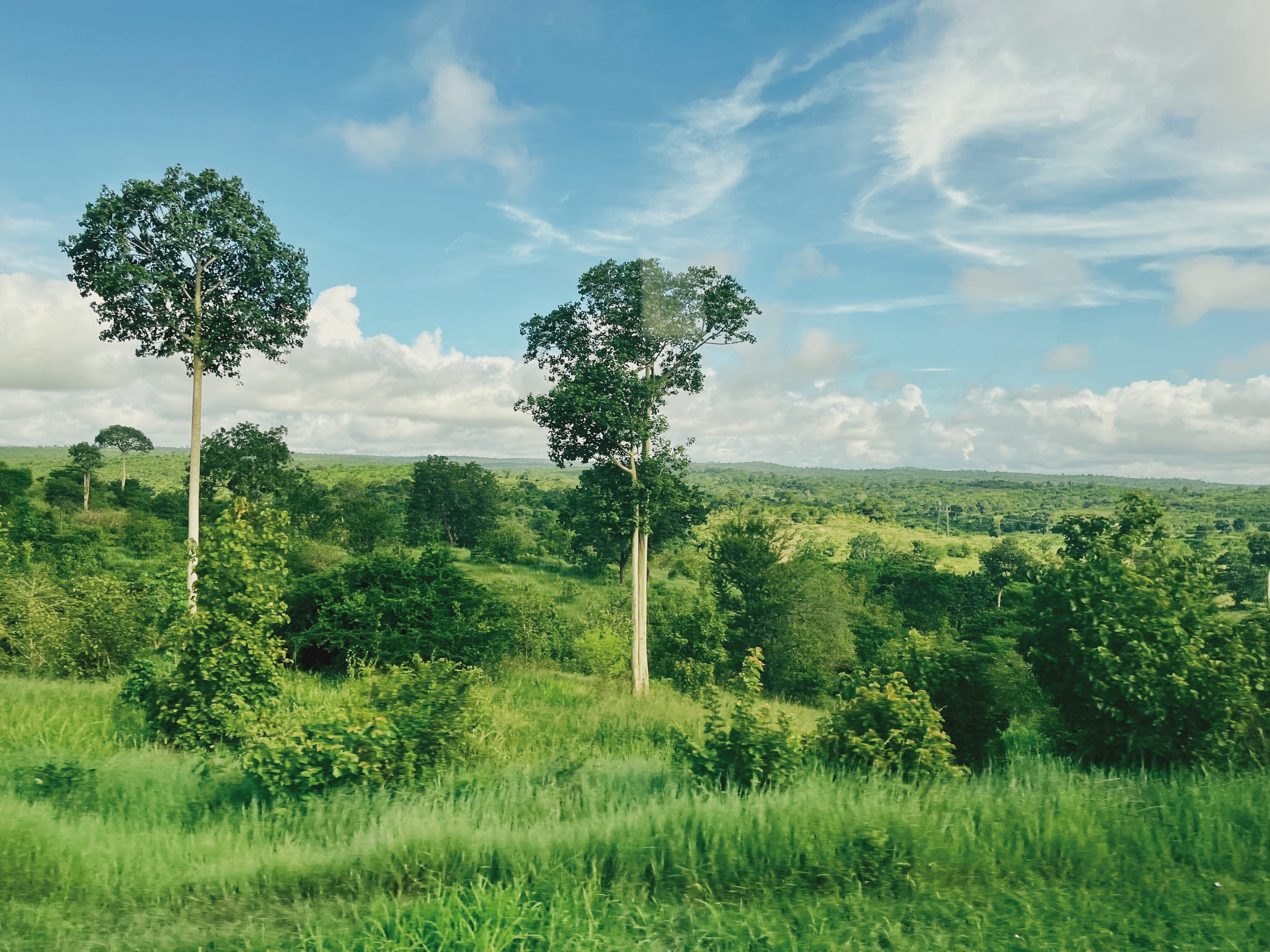
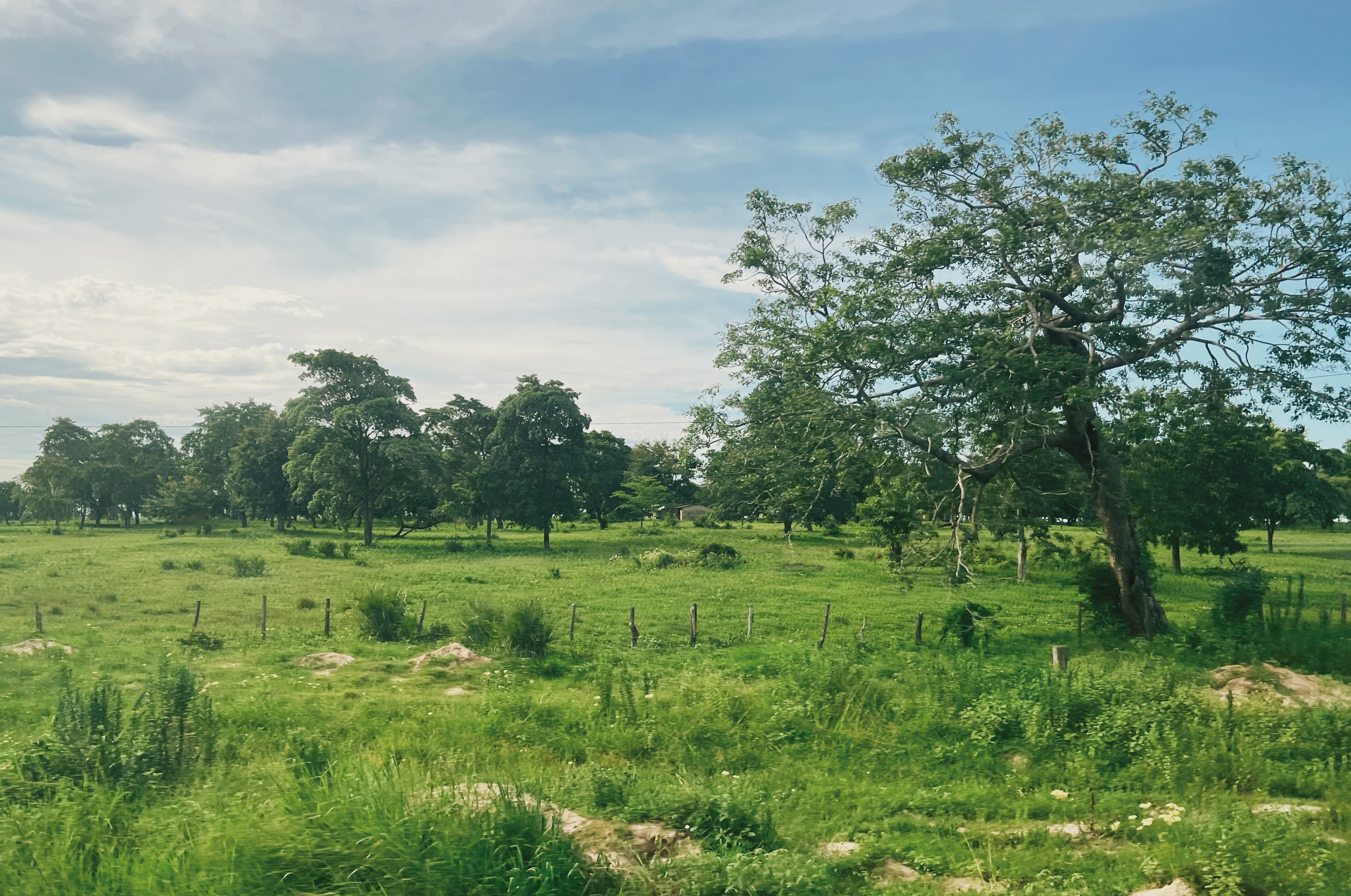
- From top to bottom: Mbwewe Landscape in Chalinze DC, Chalinze District Capital Building in Bwiligu and Vigwaza landscape of chalinze District
- Nickname: Home of the Saadani National Park
- Chalinze District in Pwani
- Coordinates: 6°38′18.96″S 38°21′7.56″E
- Country: Tanzania
- Region: Pwani Region
- Named for: Chalinze ward
- Capital: Bwilingu

Area
  - Total: 8,042 km^{2} (3,105 sq mi)
  - Rank: 3rd in Pwani

Population (2022)
  - Total: 316,759
  - Rank: 3rd in Pwani
  - Density: 39.39/km^{2} (102.0/sq mi)
- Demonym: Chalinzean

Ethnic groups
  - Settler: Swahili
  - Native: Kwere, Doe people, Zaramo & Zigua
- Website: Chalinze District Council
- Symbols of Tanzania
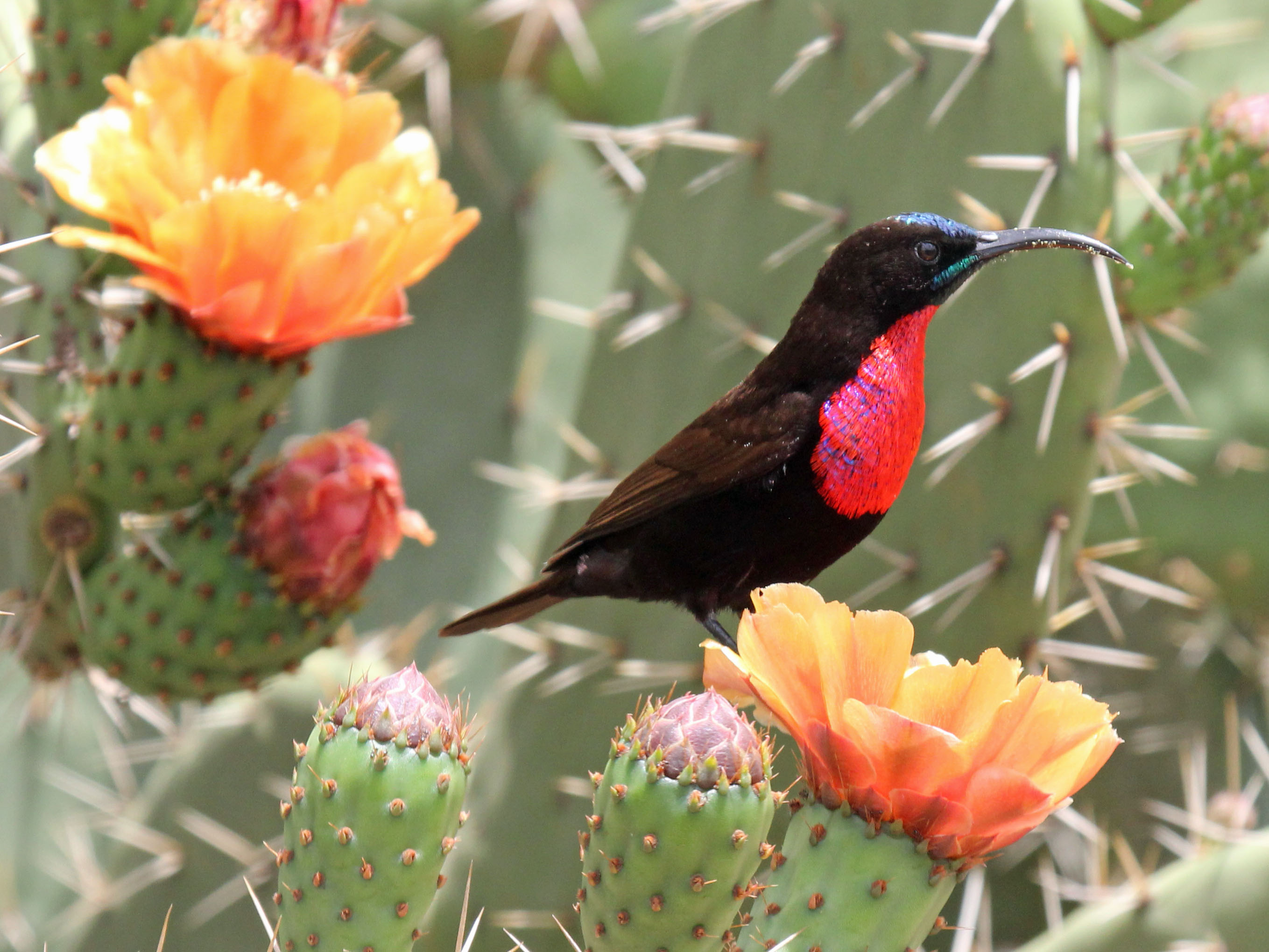
- Bird: Hunter's sunbird

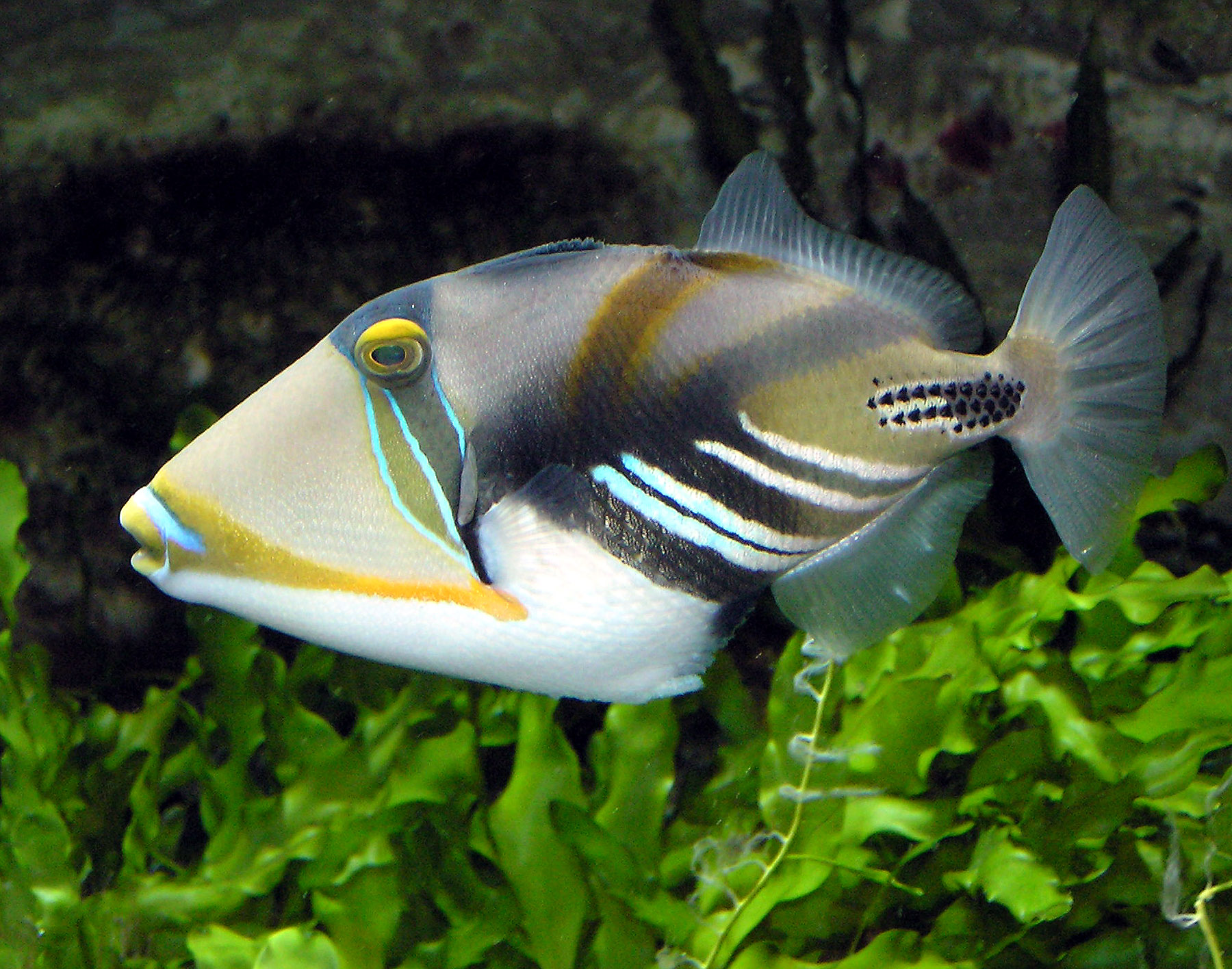
- Fish: Lagoon triggerfish

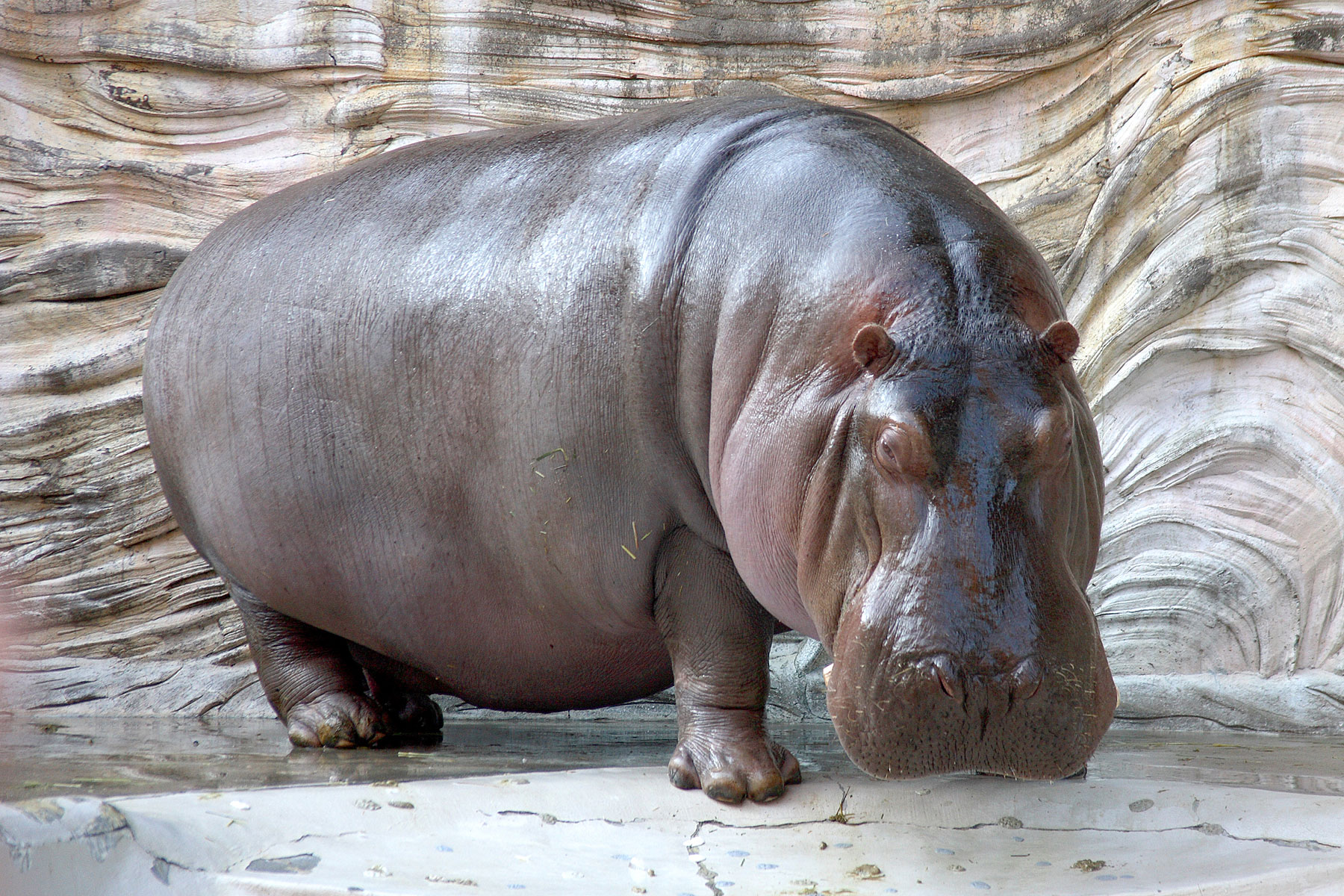
- Mammal: hippopotamus

Chalinze District Council (Swahili: Wilaya ya Chalinze) is one of nine administrative districts of Pwani Region in Tanzania. The district covers an area of 8,042 km^{2} (3,105 sq mi). The district is comparable in size to the land area of Puerto Rico. Chalinze District is bordered to the northeast by Pangani District, the north by Handeni District and in Kilindi District of Tanga Region. The district is bordered to the east by the Indian Ocean. Chalinze is also borders Bagamoyo District, Kibaha Urban District and to the South by Kibaha District. On the western part, the district is bordered by Mvomero District and Morogoro Rural District of Morogoro Region.

The district seat (capital) is the town and ward of Bwilingu. The district is named after the town of Chalinze itself. The district is home to Tanzania's 5th President, Jakaya Kikwete, who was born and raised in Msoga, Chalinze District. He was also a member of parliament of the district during his political career. The district was created from Bagamoyo District in July 2016. In addition, the district is home to the southern portion of Saadani National Park, which is the only terrestrial national park in the country next to the ocean. According to the 2012 census, the district has a total population of 214,080. by 2022, the population had grown to 316,759.

== Administrative subdivisions ==
As of 2016, Chalinze District was administratively divided into 16 wards.

=== Wards ===
1. Bwilingu
2. Kerege
3. Kibindu
4. Kimange
5. Kiwangwa
6. Lugoba
7. Mandera
8. Mbwewe

1. Miono
2. Mkange
3. Msata
4. Msoga
5. Pera
6. Talawanda
7. Ubenazomozi
8. Vigwaza

== Geography ==
=== Climate ===
Chalinze's climate falls under subtype "Aw" of the Koppen Climate Classification. (Climate of a Tropical Savanna). Chalinze's yearly average temperature is 78.4 °F (25.8 °C). The average temperature for the warmest month is 82.0 °F (27.8 °C) in February. July has the lowest average temperature of any month, at 74.3 °F (23.5 °C). Chalinze experiences 37.5" of precipitation on average per year (952.5 mm). With an average rainfall of 8.0 in (200 mm), April is the month with the most precipitation. July has an average of 0.6" of precipitation, making it the month with the least amount (15.2 mm). The average number of days with precipitation is 108.0, with 16.3 days in April recording the highest total and June recording the lowest total.

Climate data for Chalinze
Month	Jan	Feb	Mar	Apr	May	Jun	Jul	Aug	Sep	Oct	Nov	Dec	Year
Mean daily maximum °C (°F)	33 (92)	34 (93)	33 (91)	31 (87)	29 (85)	29 (84)	29 (85)	31 (87)	32 (89)	33 (91)	33 (91)	33 (91)	33 (91)
Mean daily minimum °C (°F)	23 (74)	23 (73)	23 (73)	22 (71)	21 (69)	18 (65)	18 (64)	18 (64)	18 (65)	20 (68)	21 (70)	23 (73)	18 (65)
Average precipitation mm (inches)	80.7 (3.18)	80.7 (3.18)	124.8 (4.91)	204.4 (8.05)	94.1 (3.70)	25.7 (1.01)	16.2 (0.64)	18.9 (0.74)	40.6 (1.60)	65.7 (2.59)	97.5 (3.84)	103 (4.1)	952.3 (37.49)
Source 1: Weatherbase
Source 2: Weatherspark

== History ==
The area that is now Chalinze District has been inhabited by humans for thousands of years by Bantu peoples. The area is the ancestral home to three Bantu people groups, namely the Kwere, Doe people and the Zigua. The Zaramo are native to the southern portion of the district.

== Education & Health ==
As of 2022, there were 142 Schools in Chalinze District, 112 of are primary schools and 30 are secondary schools. In Terms of Healthcare facilities, as of 2022 Chalinze district is home to 5 health centers and 39 clinics.
