= Doe people =

Ethnic group from Pwani Region, Tanzania

Doe
Wadoe

Regions with significant populations
- Tanzania: 24,000 (1987)

Languages
- Doe language

Religion
- Majority: Islam; Minority: African Traditional Religion,

Related ethnic groups
- Zaramo, Kwere people & other Bantu peoples

The Doe (Wadoe in Swahili) are an ethnic and linguistic group based in northern coastal Tanzania, in the Bagamoyo District and Chalinze District of Pwani Region. In 1987 the Doe population was estimated to number 24,000.

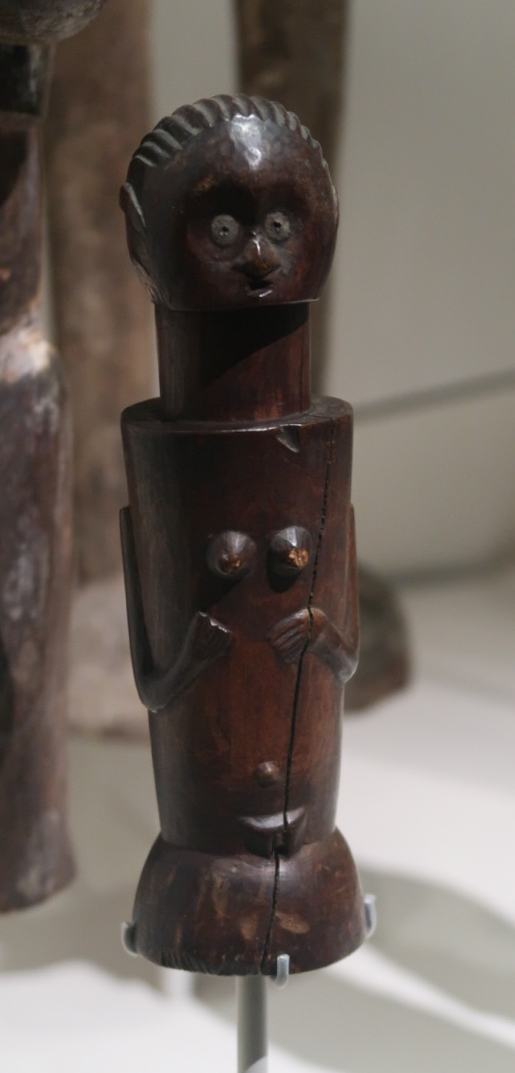
Mwana hiti figure.. Zaramo or Doe people. Musée des Confluences
