= Saadani National Park =

National Park of Tanzania

- Hifadhi ya Taifa ya Saadani
- IUCN category II (national park)
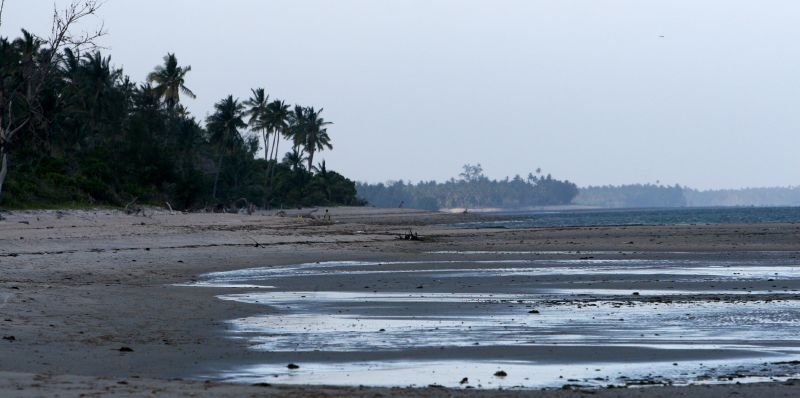
- Saadani beach

- Location within Tanzania
- Coordinates: 6°00′S 38°45′E
- Area: 1,062 km^{2} (410 sq mi)
- Established: 2005
- Visitors: 15,415 (in 2012)
- Governing body: Tanzania National Parks Authority
- Website: Park website

Saadani National Park is a national park in Tanzania with an area of 1,062 km^{2} (410 sq mi). It was officially gazetted in 2005 and is managed under the Tanzania National Parks Authority. It is located in southeastern Pangani District of Tanga Region and northeast Chalinze District of Pwani Region.

== History ==
Gazetted in 2005, it encompasses a preserved ecosystem including the former Saadani game reserve, the former Mkwaja ranch area, the Wami River as well as the Zaraninge Forest. In the late 1960s Saadani Village – the village after which the park has been named – and particularly its sub-village Uvinje, invited the Tanzania Wildlife Division (WD) to help them to prevent the indiscriminate killing of wildlife prevalent in the area. From this partnership Saadani village and the Wildlife Division established the Saadani Game Reserve (SGR), with the agreement to respect the land rights of the coastal sub-villages of Saadani, including Uvinje and Porokanya sub-villages, while also addressing the needs of wildlife.

As such, conservation interventions in the Saadani landscape have taken place since the mid-1960s and have been supported by villagers traditionally inhabiting the Saadani landscape, but it is only recently that state-managed conservation has become a growing concern among the villages adjacent to the park.

In the late 1990s, Mr. Domician Njao, from Tanzania National Parks Authority (TANAPA) came in to "upgrade" the reserve to a National Park, and create the first and only coastal national park of Tanzania. In doing so, park authorities redrew the boundaries of the reserve to include Uvinje's and Porokanya's prime coastal lands as if they have always been a part of the reserve in so doing changing the agreement with those villagers. Compelling research shows how after this TANAPA proceeded to gazette most of Saadani's coastal lands as part of the Saadani National Park in 2005, arguing that they have always being a part of the former reserve and belonged to the Park. Spatial analysis on the area of the former Saadani Game reserve, illustrates TANAPA's strategy to gazette Saadani's prime coastal lands as if they have always been a part of the SGR. The total extent of SGR is said to have been approximately 209 km^{2} (81 sq mi), however, the SGR official gazette document states that it comprised approximately 300 km^{2} (120 sq mi),

The vagueness of the language used in the reserve's official gazette, but also TANAPA's early interventions to develop its own map of the reserve, and its interests in Saadani's sub-villages’ prime coastal lands have come to challenge Saadani's coastal sub-villages’ rights to lawfully inhabit their traditional territories, and have led to chronic political and other battles to demand presently gazetted park lands rescinded, the reestablishment of land rights to traditional inhabitants, and to demand from TANAPA to honour commitments made earlier by Wildlife Division.

== The Current Status of Saadani National Park ==
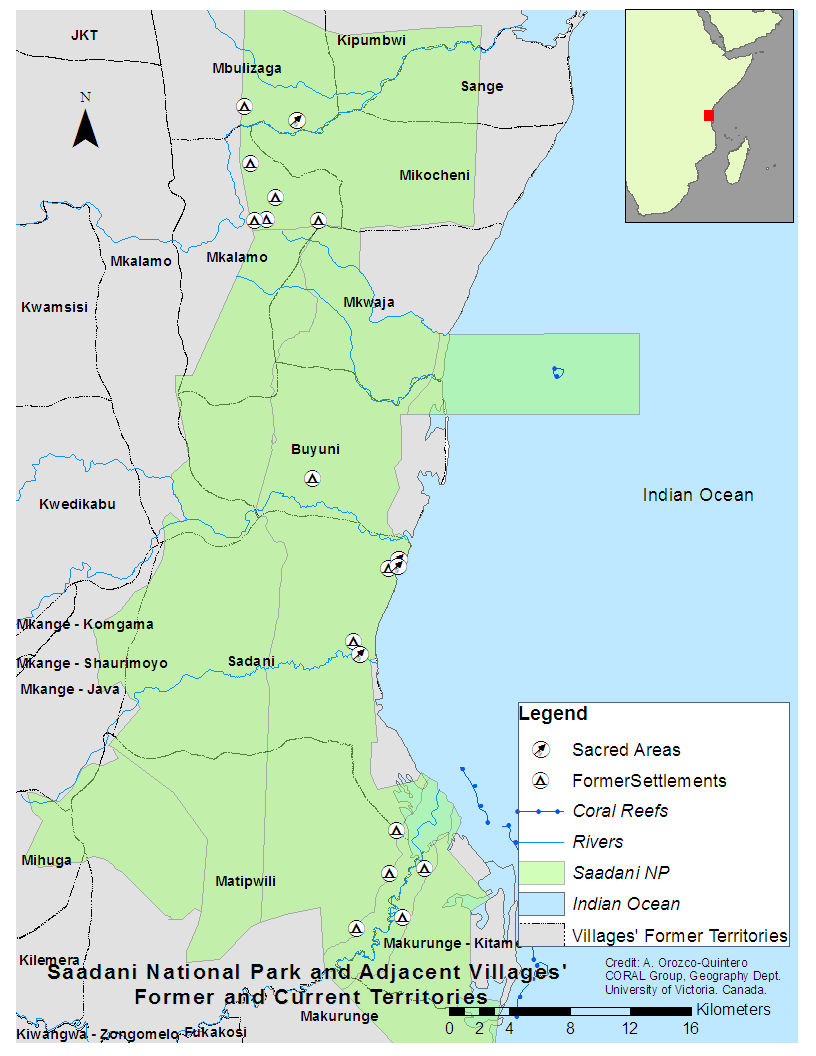
Saadani National Park Map and extent of former village lands now gazetted as park lands.

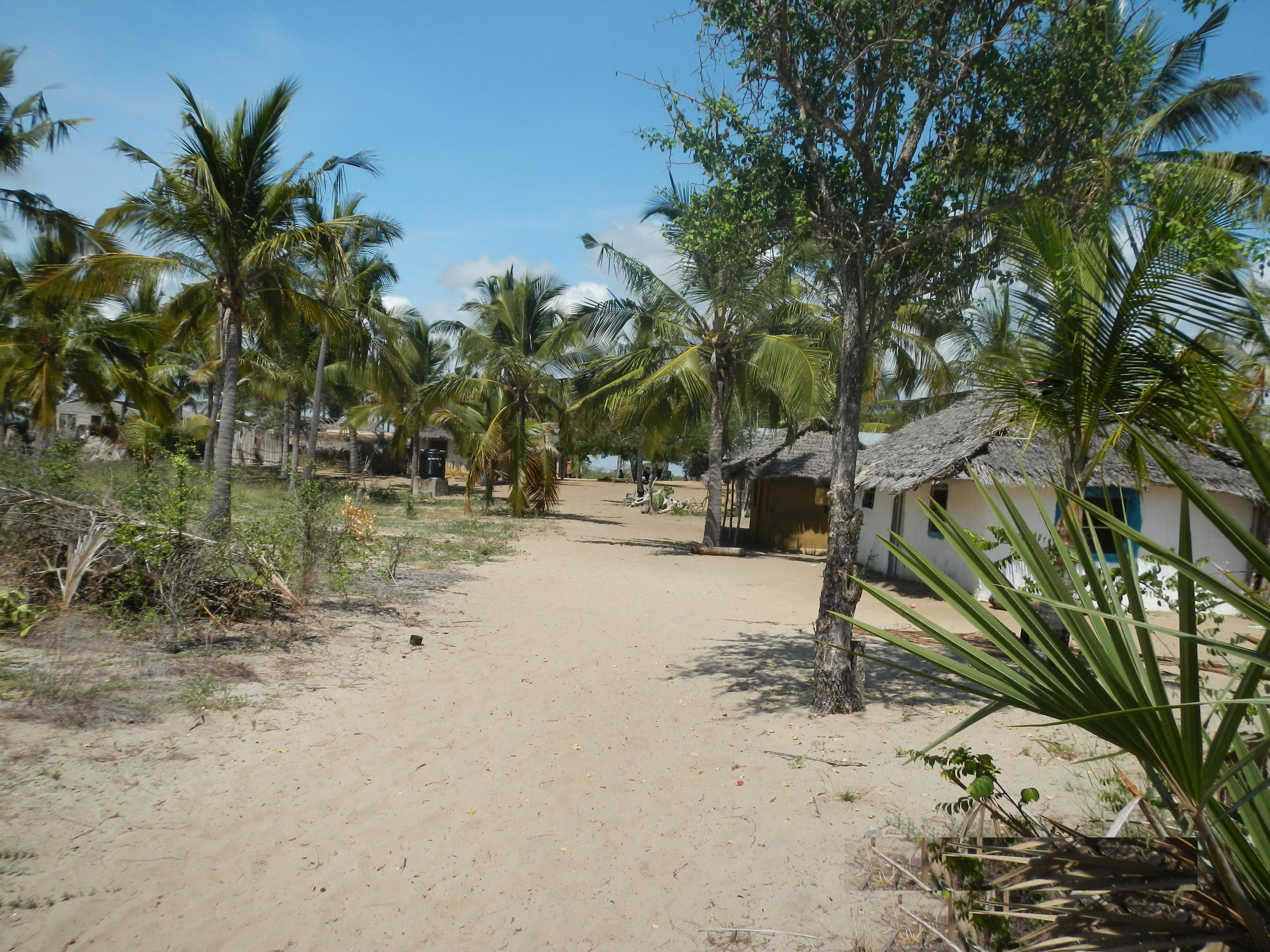
One of the villages in Saadani

By law, setting aside areas for conservation has to be consulted on, at least to some extent, with affected villages. However, it was not until late in 2005 that the village of Saadani and leaders of its Uvinje sub-village realized that the full extent of Uvinje's lands were gazetted as part of the park. This despite numerous communications taking place since the early 2000s where village leaders continuously reiterate that Uvinje lands have never been a part of the reserve and that they will not vacate their lands. Important park establishment documents illustrate that TANAPA's argument for gazetting lands from two Saadani coastal sub-villages is that they have always being part of the former game reserve, an argument that seem to have allowed them to move forward gazetting the coastal lands without coming to an agreement with the leaders at that time, who have reiterated that they did not agree to giving coastal lands to TANAPA.

In summary, the SNP boundaries and lands have been officially contested by District authorities and no less than 6 villages, while at least 4 adjacent villages are engaged in higher level advocacy to have park boundaries reassessed. However, of all the villages, it is Saadani which faces the greatest challenges on the gazetting of a large part of its coastal territory which, by all accounts, has been done unilaterally. Saadani is also the village with the largest strip of coastal land.

At present, and after more than a decade of institutional struggles, Saadani village has resisted TANAPA's various approaches to take possession of the now sub-village's gazetted territory and have consistently demanded that their land rights be restored, and continue to reiterate that they are not going to give their traditional territory for any amount of compensation money. Such community assertions and actions certainly challenge traditional conceptions of economic gain as the central motivation in park community-conflicts, and suggest that deeply rooted spatial-cultural territorial connections are as essential as and perhaps even more important to people's collective welfare than material benefits.

To this day, park governance and management approaches have been unable to gain the support of surrounding villages, which traditionally have been very conservation minded, for addressing poaching and for collaboratively sustaining landscape level conservation efforts. All of which are desperately needed to combat the sevenfold increase in poaching activity being faced by the park in the last seven years. No less than 10 of the 17 villages adjacent to the park have their own community-conserved areas, equivalent to no less than 20% of area identified as park lands. Despite the level of environmental awareness of these adjacent villages and the importance of corridors and ecosystem connectivity to successful ecological conservation, the villages’ conservation efforts have not been linked to park efforts but at present represent a threat to park authorities. For park authorities, it is within villages’ conserved areas where more often than not poaching is seen to be taking place.

== Climate ==
The Park experiences an Eastern African coastal climate with bimodal rainfall, which ranges 800 – 1200mm annually. Long rains fall from March to June and short ones from October to December. February and July are the best driest months with peak temperatures reaching up to 29C. The best period for visits is the dry season, although the Park remains attractive year-round.

== Wildlife ==
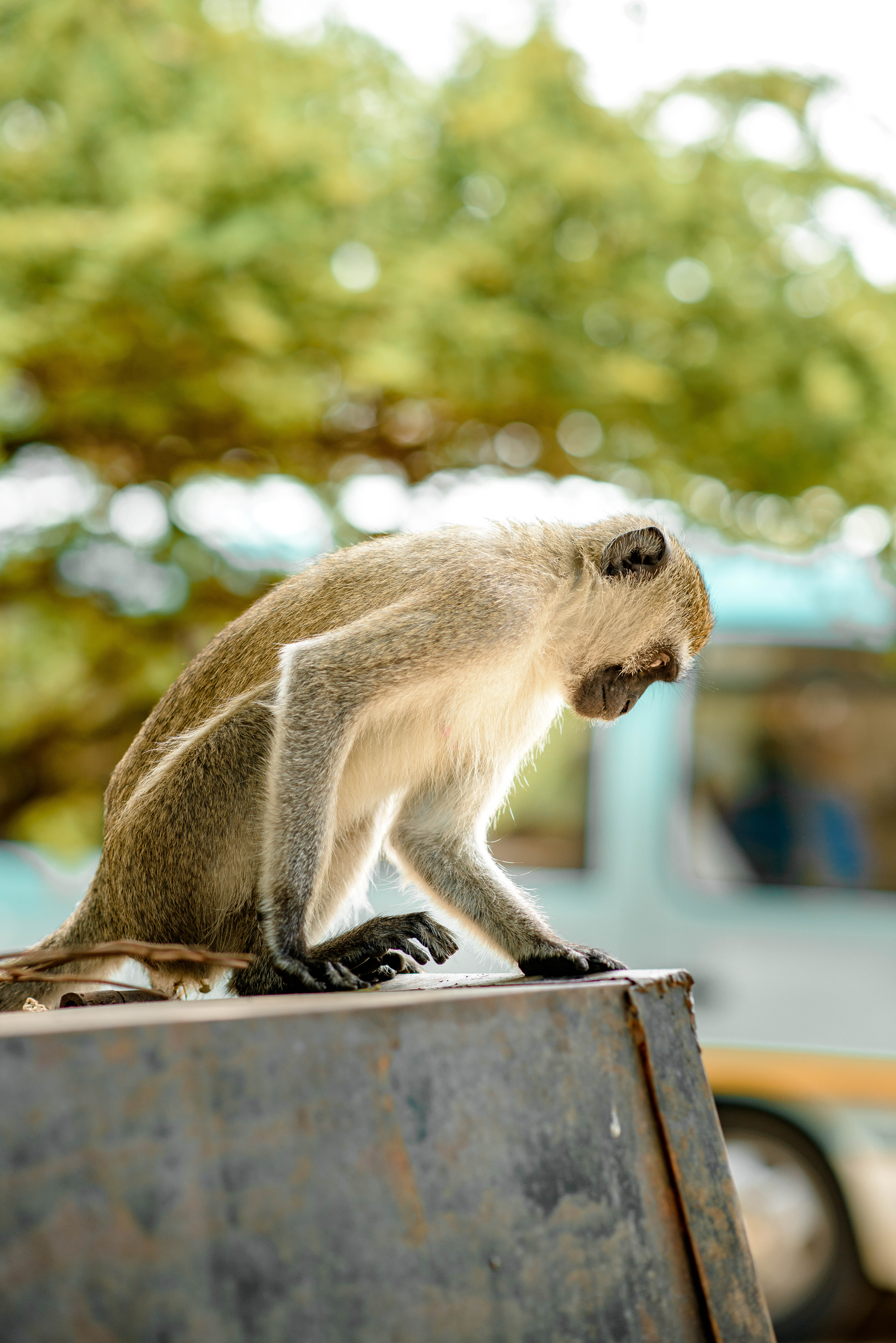
Ngedere (Green monkey)

Saadani's wildlife population is increasing during recent years after it has been gazetted as a National Park and was a hunting block beforehand. Wildlife in Saadani includes four of the Big Five, namely lions, African bush elephants, Cape buffaloes and leopards. Masai giraffes, Lichtenstein's hartebeest, waterbucks, blue wildebeests, bohor reedbucks, common and red duikers, Dik-Diks, yellow baboons, vervet monkeys, blue monkeys, Colobus monkeys, mongooses, genets, porcupines, sable antelopes, warthogs, hippopotamuses, crocodiles, nile monitors are also found in the park.

Since 2005, the protected area is considered a Lion Conservation Unit.
