= Bagamoyo District =

District of Pwani Region, Tanzania

Bagamoyo District Wilaya ya Bagamoyo (Swahili)
- District of Pwani
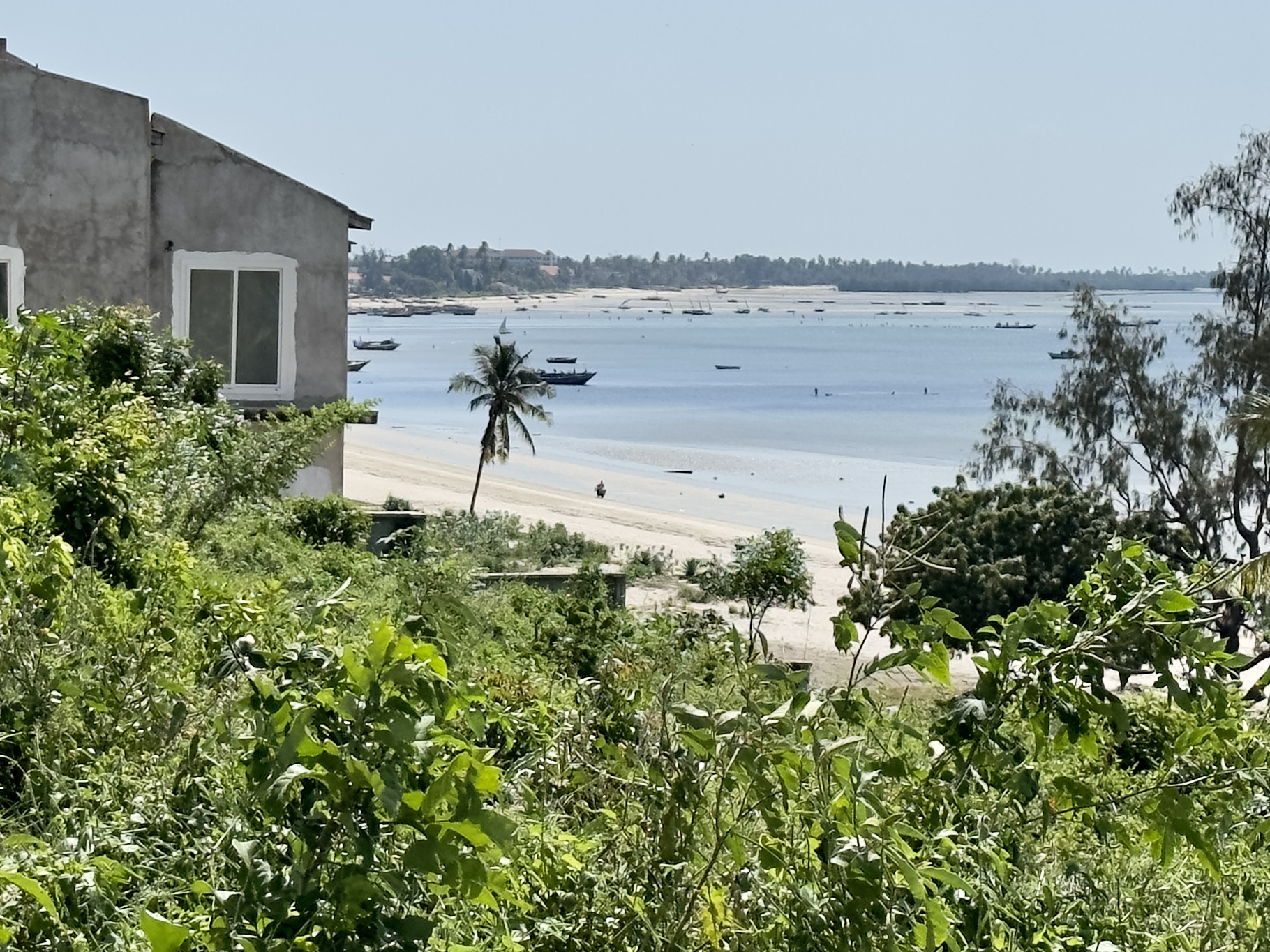
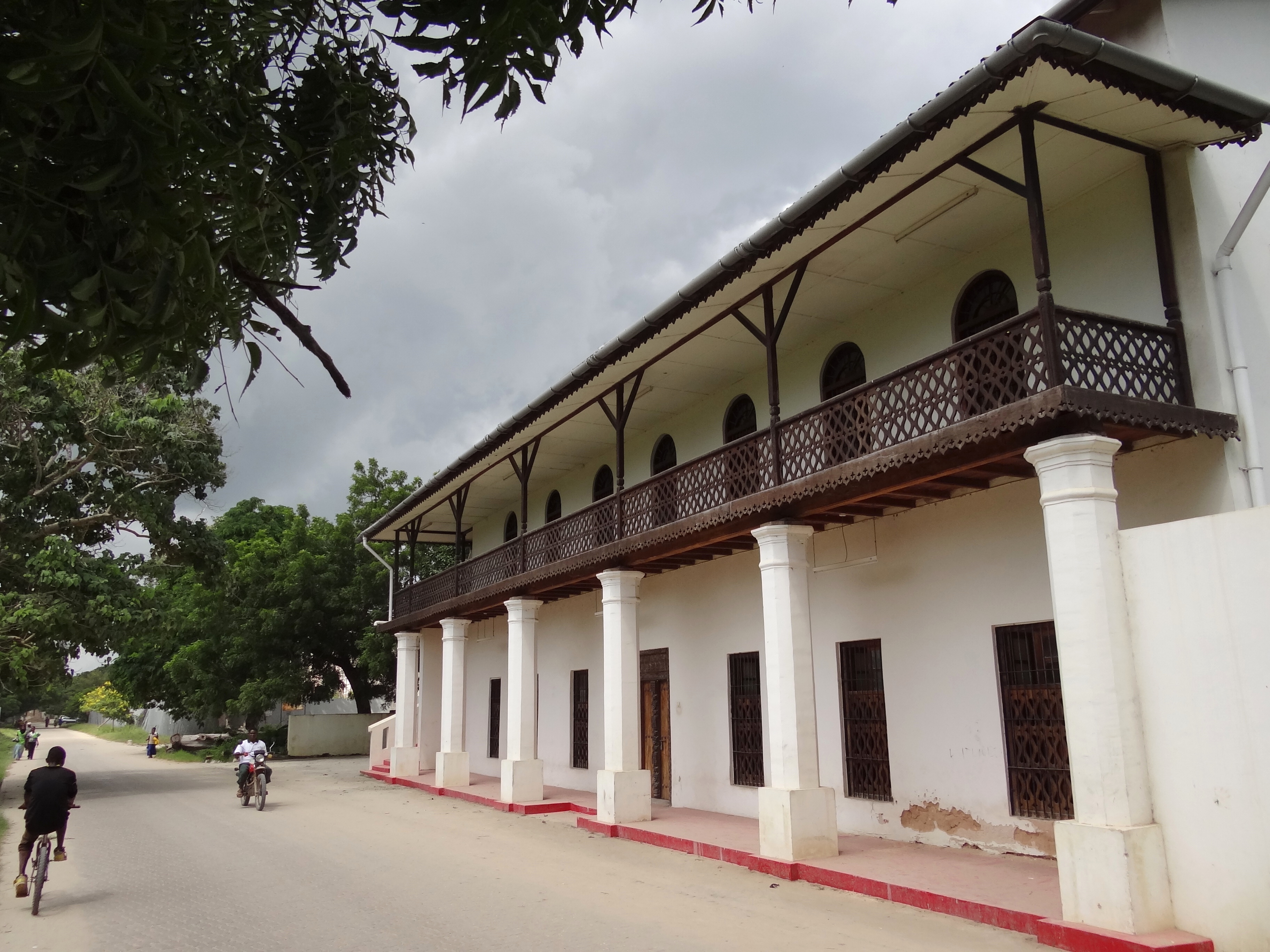
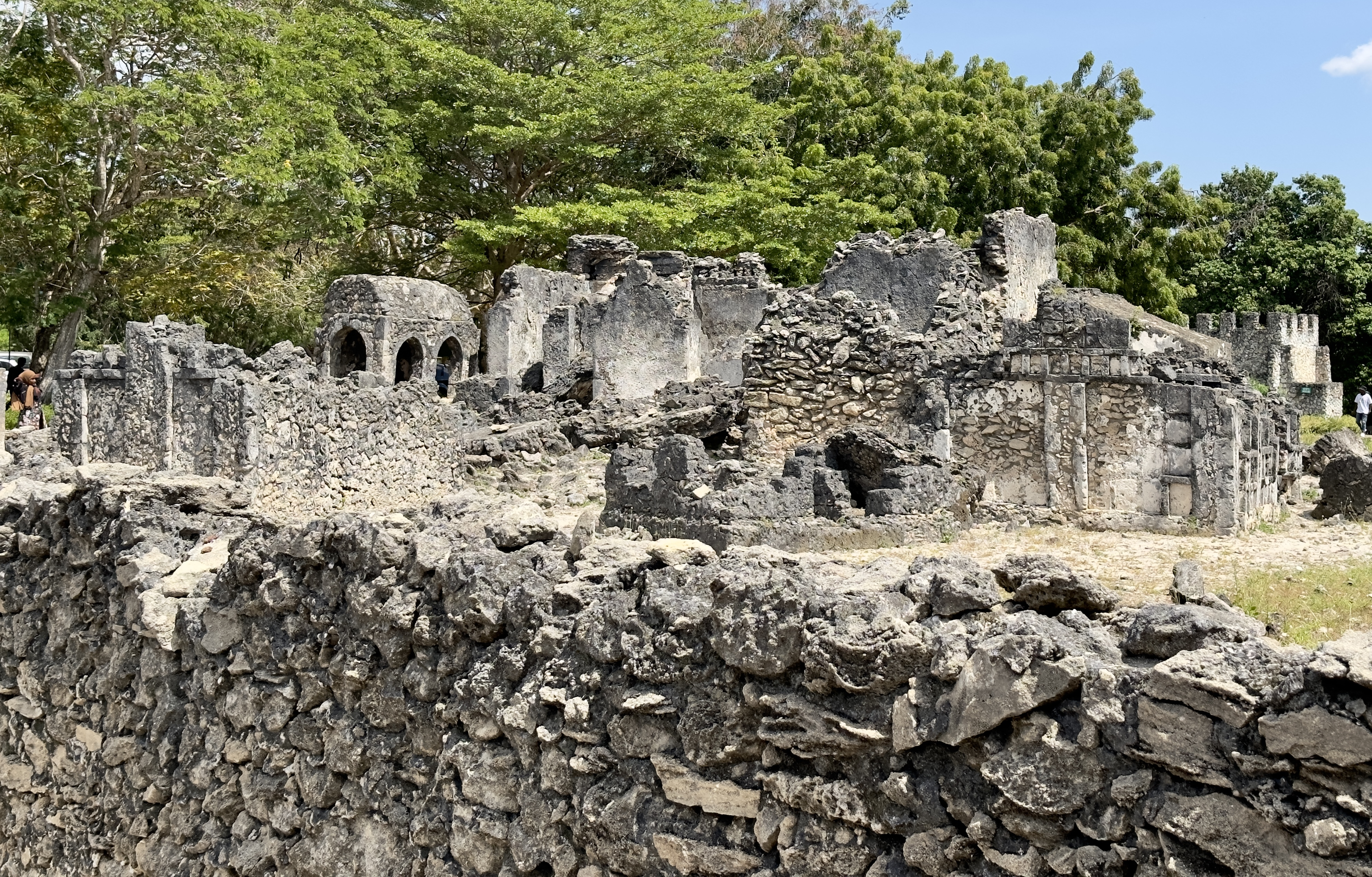
- From top to bottom: View of Bagamoyo Bay, Old Arab Teahouse in Bagamoyo Town and ruins of Kaole, a National Historic Site in Bagamoyo District
- Nickname: Historic Pwani
- Bagamoyo District in Pwani
- Coordinates: 6°20′12″S 38°23′38″E
- Country: Tanzania
- Region: Pwani Region
- Named for: Bagamoyo Town
- Capital: Bagamoyo

Area
  - Total: 945 km^{2} (365 sq mi)
  - Rank: 7th in Pwani

Population (2022)
  - Total: 205,478
  - Rank: 8th in Pwani
  - Density: 217/km^{2} (563/sq mi)

Ethnic groups
  - Settler: Swahili
  - Native: Zaramo
- Time zone: UTC+3 (EAT)
- Tanzanian Postcode: 613
- Website: Bagamoyo District Council
- Symbols of Tanzania
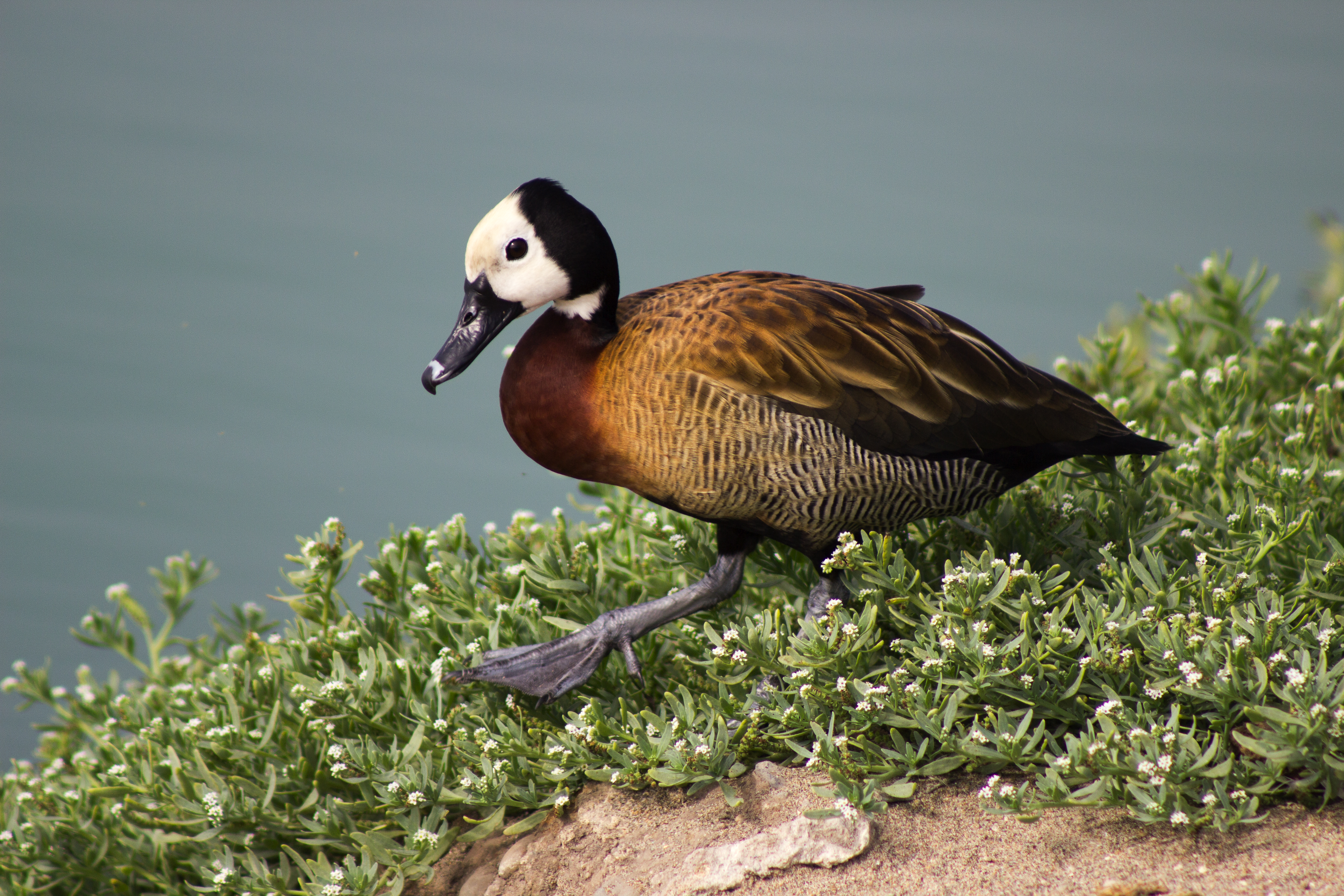
- Bird: White-faced whistling duck

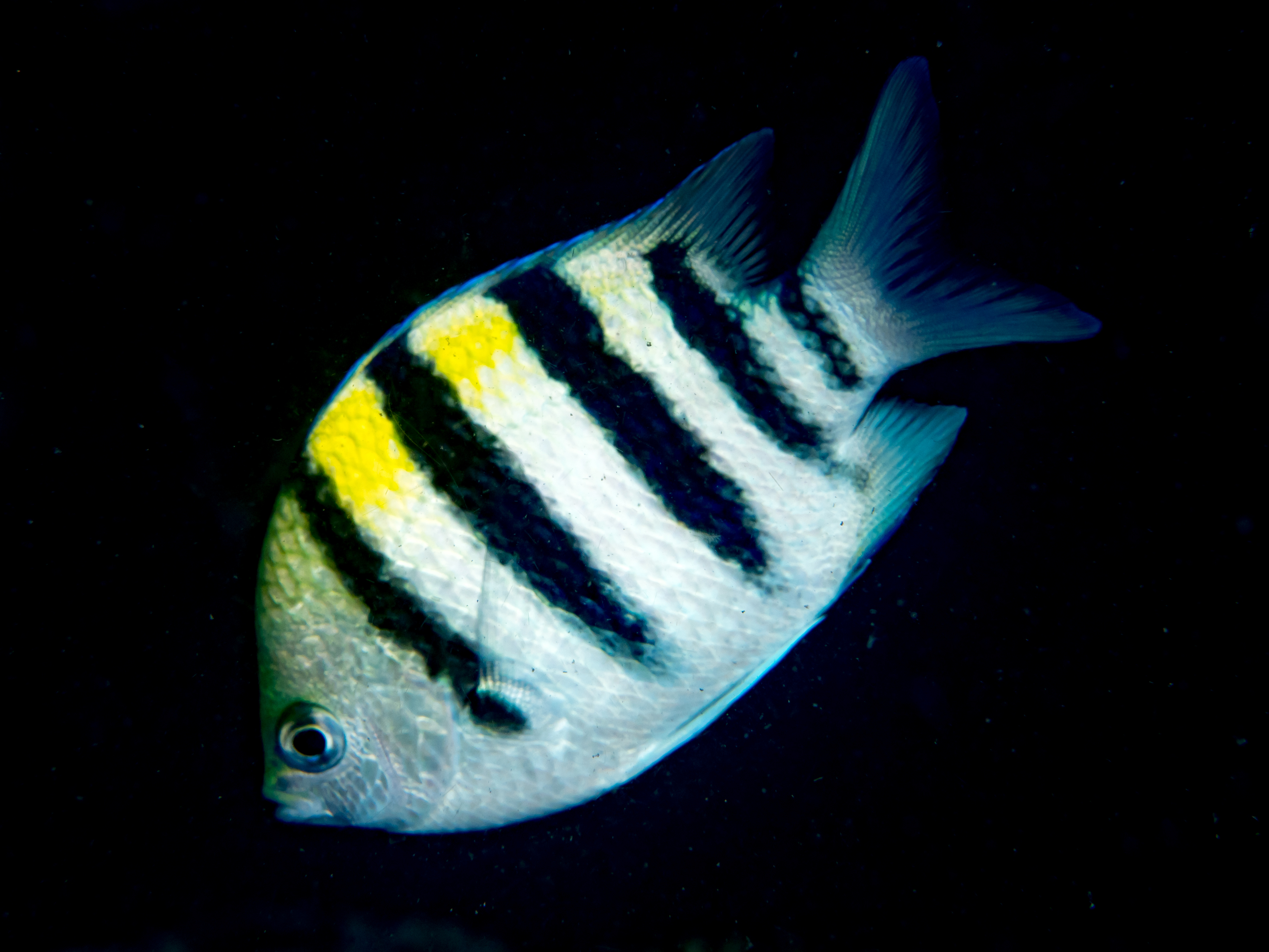
- Fish: Indo-Pacific sergeant

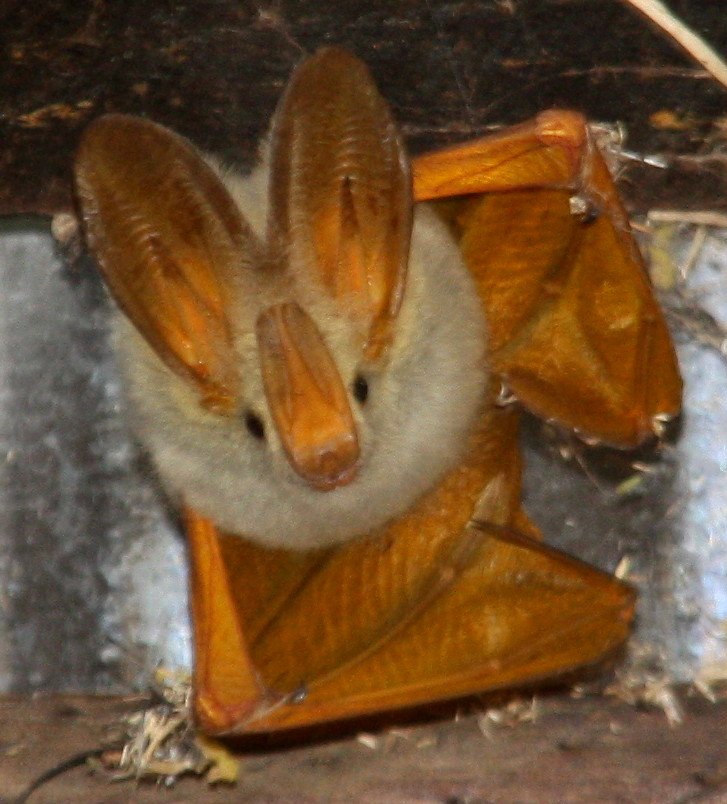
- Mammal: Yellow-winged bat

Bagamoyo District (Wilaya ya Bagamoyo, in Swahili) is one of eight administrative districts of Pwani Region in Tanzania. The district covers an area of 945 km^{2} (365 sq mi). The district is surrounded by the Chalinze District to the north and west, the Zanzibar Channel to the east, the Kibaha District to the south, and the Kinondoni District to the south-east in the Dar es Salaam Region. The district is comparable in size to the land area of Turks and Caicos Islands. The district capital is Bagamoyo. As of 2022, the population of Bagamoyo district is 205,478.

== Administration ==
Bagamoyo district council is made up of 2 Divisions, 11 Wards, 8 Villages and 174 hamlets.

1. Dunda
2. Fukayosi
3. Kerege
4. Kirimo
5. Kisutu
6. Magomeni
1. Makurunge
2. Mapinga
3. Nia Njema
4. Yombo
5. Zinga

== Geography ==
Bagamyo receives an average of 800 mm - 1200 mm of rain per year. The district has two rainy seasons which are the warm season which starts in October to December and the spring season which starts in March to June.

== Economy ==
Agriculture, including the production of rice, maize, cotton, sesame, pineapple, cashew, sweet potato, coconut, and mango, is the main source of income for the Bagamoyo district council. Large scale fishing in the Zanzibar Channel and artisanal fishing with dugout canoes on dams on the Ruvu River. Also livestock breeding, seaweed and premium salt harvesting. Tourism is a big income earner for the district through its beaches, marine life, mangrove reserves, and coral reefs. Cultural tourism in the district includes historical places, paintings, sculptures, traditional dances, and cultural apparel.

90% of the people in the district work in agriculture and animal husbandry, which together account for the majority of Bagamoyo's economic activity. Fishing, hunting, commerce (primarily agro-trade), industrial growth, artisanal and informal activities, and tourism are further economically stable pursuits. The district's economic foundation is provided by these activities. The district's per capita income in 2002 was projected to be 128,000 Tanzanian shillings (approximately $250) annually, significantly less than the US$260 per year average for the country. Despite the low 2002 statistic, the poverty reduction strategy's implementation has helped boost Bagamoyo's current per capita income levels to more than US$320.

The informal sector of the economy employs a sizable portion of the labour force in Bagamoyo. Hawkers and kiosks, which primarily operate from stalls, are fairly prevalent in Bagamoyo's streets and residential neighbourhoods. People who are not employed formally and those looking for supplementary income can make money through informal work. Even while Bagamoyo's bus terminals and important road intersections are buzzing with informal activity, the district council hasn't been helping to regulate or encourage it. The district's economic development has been hampered by a lack of infrastructure support and weak policies for the industry, which has also caused geographical disarray, particularly among the informal settlements.

=== Infrastructure ===
A total of 3,033 km of roads exist in the Bagamoyo district, including 236 km of motorways, 297 km of regional roads, and 2,500 km of rural district and village roads. The Dar es Salaam-Bagamoyo road was made possible by the adoption of the "Vision 2025" strategy for eradicating poverty, which Bagamoyo district worked on in conjunction with other partners. The district has also been able to maintain 55 km of district roads.

In informal settlements, urban infrastructure and essential services are subpar or nonexistent. The need for housing, water, sanitization, and roads has expanded in Bagamoyo due to the city's expanding population. Local administrations have found it difficult to meet these expectations due to limited resources. More bore wells and rainfall harvesting systems were built by the district council in an effort to increase the water supply. Two projects for piped water delivery have also been carried out by the district. In 2002, 50% of the people in Bagamoyo had access to clean, safe water.

== Demographics ==
The original inhabitants of the district were the Zaramo, then followed by the Swahili and eventually colonial period starting with the Portuguese, Arabs and then the Germans and British. Only a few of the colonisers' descendants are still in Bagamoyo town today. Most of the current population is cosmopolitan with peoples from all over the mainland. According to the 2022 census, the district had a total population of 205,478 (101,827 males and 103,651 females).

== Health and Education ==
=== Health ===
There are a total of 38 health service stations in the Bagamoyo District. The population's needs cannot be met by this small number of healthcare institutions, which results in an uneven doctor-to-patient ratio. All patients cannot be seen by doctors in a timely manner. Positively, there have been improvements in the health indicators for kids. Overall, the number of immunisations has grown, the number of children receiving vitamin A supplements has climbed by 5.8%, and infant death rates have decreased. The district hospital has been renovated, and dispensaries have been built. Organised committees in 16 villages have been offered knowledge on malaria control. To purchase mosquito nets and insecticide for district residents, a "revolving fund" has been set up in the district.

=== Education ===
There are 110 primary schools in the Bagamoyo district. The district has been able to build 201 classes thanks to the Primary Education Development Programme. In accordance with the programme, enrollment in primary schools rose by 77 percent, 109 percent, and 93 percent in 2001, 2002, and 2003, respectively. The district has also constructed 28 homes for elementary school teachers in cooperation with other partners. The general working, residing, and learning environments for both pupils and teachers have significantly improved thanks to the classroom and residential building. Resources should be distributed in accordance with the rising student enrollment.
