= Kwere people =

Ethnic group from Pwani and Morogoro Regions of Tanzania

Kwere
Wakwere

Total population
- 98,000 (1987)

Regions with significant populations
- Tanzania Pwani Region (Bagamoyo District) (Chalinze District) (Kisarawe District) Morogoro Region (Morogoro Rural District)

Languages
- Kikwere & Swahili

Religion
- Majority Islam, Minority Christianity and African Traditional Religion

Related ethnic groups
- Zaramo, Luguru, Kutu Kami, Nguu, Kaguru & other coastal Bantu peoples

- Person: Mkwere
- People: Wakwere
- Language: Kikwere

The Kwere or Kwele also known as Ngh'wele (Wakwere in Swahili) are a matrilineal ethnic and linguistic group native to Bagamoyo District, Kisarawe District and Chalinze District in Pwani Region of coastal Tanzania. The primary language spoken is Ngh'wele, called Kikwere in Swahili. The most famous person of Kwere descent is former President of Tanzania, Jakaya Kikwete.

== Population and geography ==
39,199 Kwere lived in the Eastern Region in 1957 under the British occupation, mostly in the eastern Morogoro District (6,551), the northwestern Kisarawe District (2,103), and the western Bagamoyo District (29,705). 29,705). Their country appears to be sparsely populated and covers an area of around 1,500 square miles, mostly in the southwest of Bagamoyo District. Many Kwere are believed to be closely linked to the Zaramo and Luguru people, with whom they coexist.

In 1987, the Kwere population was estimated to number 98,000. The government of Tanzania released data for the 2012 census, but it was not by ethnic group and such detail may not be published in the near future. In the country's 1967 population census, 48,132 people on the mainland identified themselves as belonging to the Ngh’wele ethnic group. The overwhelming majority of them lived in their traditional residential areas in Bagamoyo district (35,404 people), with another 3,857 people living in neighboring Kisarawe district. In addition, small groups of Ngh’wele people were said to be residents of the Morogoro Region (3,764) and Dar es Salaam (2,902). Reliable census data since 1967 are not available, as subsequent government demographic collections no longer record ethnicity.

The total population of the Pwani Region for 2012 was 1,098,668. In the past, the overwhelming majority of the Kwere lived in their traditional residential areas in Bagamoyo district on the coast.

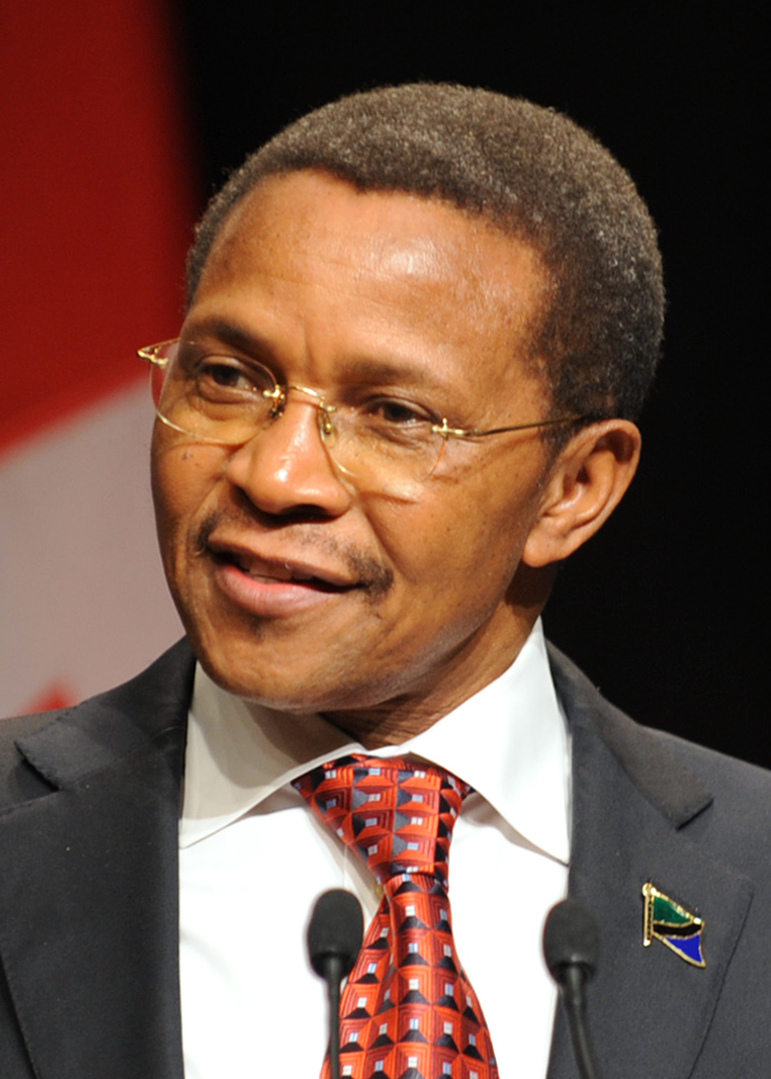
Former Tanzanian president Jakaya Kikwete is of Kwere heritage

=== Geography ===
Rolling, open bushland that is mostly dependent on seasonal rainfall characterises the Kwere's area. The region has strong rains from March to May, lighter rains from October to December, and milder, drier months from June to December. Rainfall averages approximately 45 inches per year, which is more than the 30 inches typically needed in East Africa and adequate for dependable agriculture.

== Matriarchy ==
The Kwere are thought to have lacked a centralised authority in pre-colonial times. Government headmen were usually chosen locally from among the heads of local matrilineages, rather than using any traditional procedure to choose the two subchiefs who ruled the Kwere throughout the colonial era. Every Kwere village had a chief (mpasi) before European colonisation.

Each of the numerous exogamous matri-clans (lukolo) is made up of multiple matrilineages (tembe). The names and customs of these matri-clans are frequently identical to those of nearby Kwere clans. A tiny plot of land (about 500 acres) that each matrilineage owns collective rights over is associated with it. The leaders choose a lineage head (mndewa), who receives a special lineage name and a role. He is in charge of the allocation of land, the lineage members, and the lineage customs. Certain clans participate in a customary joking alliance, known as ugongo, with one another. Brain claims that there is a food taboo in every clan.

== Traditional lifestyle ==
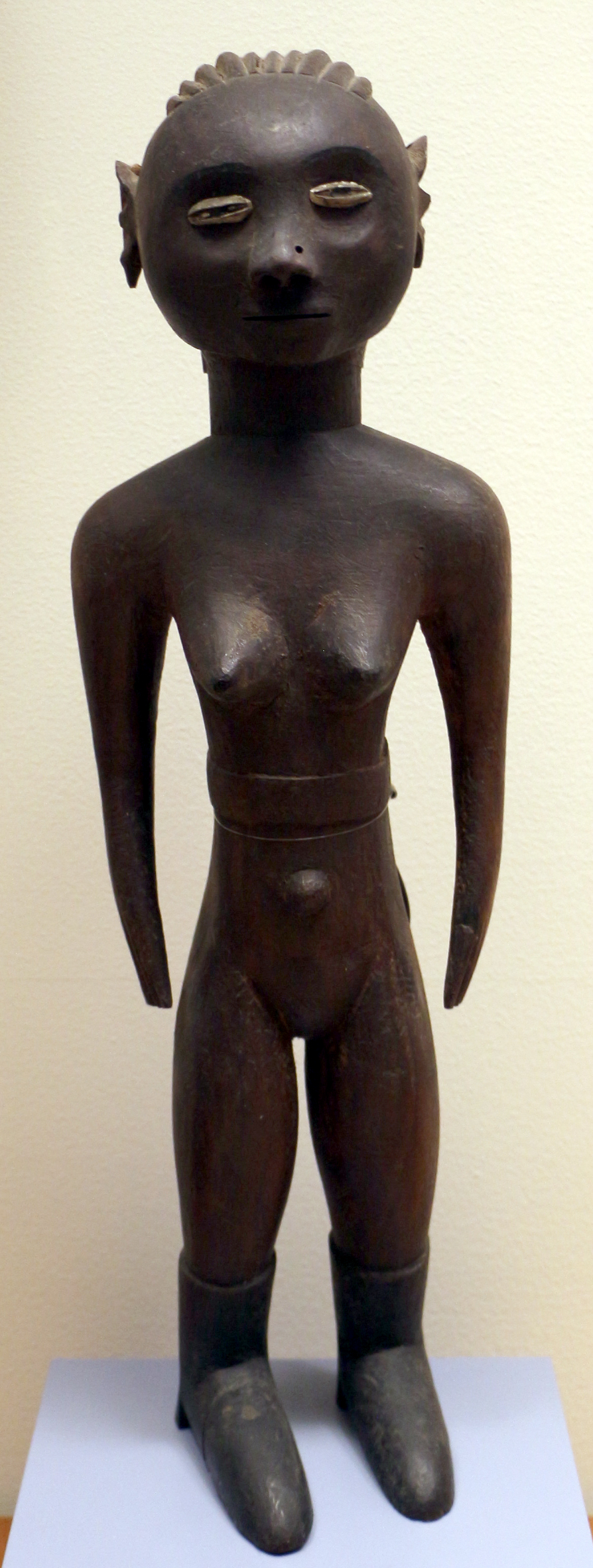
Kwere, Female figurine, 1890-1910 ca

During the 19th century, the tradition of Kwere females to wear their hair in an elevated ornate manner and to leave their breasts bare until marriage still makes them immediately identifiable from other communities. Adult ladies and men in Kwere wear in traditional Swahili attire nowadays.

As hoe-cultivators, the Kwere people plant crops in different seasons. During the short rains in October and November, they plant crops like maize, cowpeas, sorghum, cassava, and pigeon peas. In December, they plant dry rice in valley bottoms. The main planting takes place in February, when the main rains begin, and the main crops grown there are maize, sorghum, cowpeas, gramme, sesame, and cotton. Instead of hoeing large fields, they usually plant in tiny holes. Harvests start in May and last until September or October, during which time neighbours frequently work together while sipping kiwili (beer).

They capture and dry fish from both rivers and sea, grow coconuts and other tropical fruits, and rear small animals—but not cattle—in addition to crops. They make beer (upele) from sorghum and eat maize or sorghum porridge as staple foods. Like their neighbours, the Zaramo, Kwere dwellings are usually rectangular. It's unknown if the Kwere actively practice wood carving today, but they were historically renowned for their artistic and skilful work. They also make a variety of clever animal traps.

The pervasive dominance of the Swahili language in coastal affairs throughout East Africa for many centuries has led most indigenous peoples in the area to be at least bilingual, and the Ngh'were are no different. This was confirmed in 2002 by Bagamoyo elders who attended a conference held in the city championing its nomination as a UNESCO World Heritage Site. In 2011, Bagamoyo was reported as the recipient of Tanzania’s seventh World Heritage Site. What impact this award will have on Ngh'were residency in the city is not yet known, but the tour handlers are advertising globally.

== Religion ==
The Kwere people honour both maternal and paternal ancestor spirits through rituals and believe in a creator (merungu). They seek the advice of a diviner to determine the reason behind calamities ascribed to these spirits. Clan joke partners usually perform these rites, which are common between Kwere clans and nearby tribes, where they offer offerings of beer and grain at cleared graves to pacify the ghosts.

A goat or bushbuck is sacrificed at a small hut (changa) at a crossroads as part of rainmaking ceremonies (kutungula mvula), and the animal is then eaten at ancestral graves. They seek advice from Luguru rainmakers during extreme droughts. Furthermore, the Kwere have a cult called upungi that aims to use the abilities of dead diviners and doctors whose bones are stored in medicine bundles. While some Kwere are Roman Catholics, many identify as nominal Muslims.

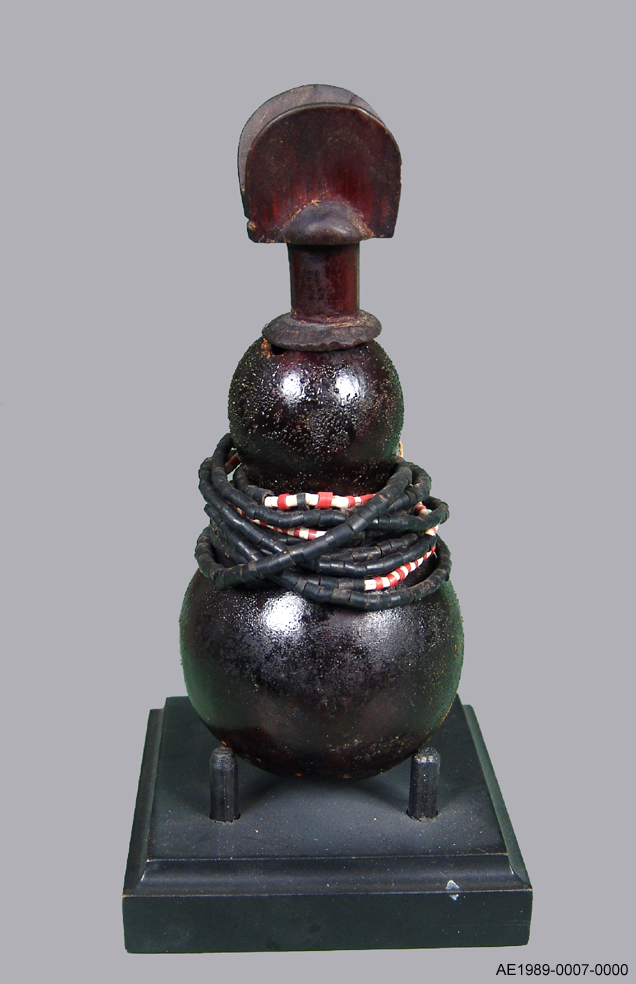
Kwere medicine holder c.1800s

== Birth ==
In the past, multiple births and breech births were associated with adultery and frequently resulted in infanticide. Wagongo (joking partners) rear children who begin to erupt their upper teeth. There are opposing views amongst the KWere on weaning. One holds that a child isn't considered weaned until they are able to walk, which forbids parents from having sex during this period. Another perspective permits ceremonial sex three months after birth, after which the child is shaven. Sexual activity is allowed after teething, but mothers should wait until their child is weaned before getting pregnant.

== Initiation rites ==
Between the ages of five and seven, boys are circumcised in the bush; traditionally, this event was celebrated with dances. Grandparents offer sexual relations advice. Circumcision was uncommon among the Kwere's eastern and western neighbours, while it's unknown if it was done previously.

Girls are sequestered during their first menstrual cycle, which is commemorated with a dance (mkore). Following a series of educational rites, the girl is considered totally mature and takes part in a coming-out dance (mlao). She is free to get married soon after, but it is not required.

== Marriage ==
Prior to a girl reaching puberty, marriage alliances frequently start with an initial payment of beads to her maternal grandmother, which has since changed to cash. The girl's father is then given a token payment, usually in installments. Although livestock was once a type of bridewealth, cash contributions have become increasingly prevalent, and today's bridewealth ranges from 40 to 200 shillings in the 1950s. Giving the girl's maternal uncle a strand of white beads is the last ceremony.

Before starting his own household, the husband often stays at the bride's house for two years after marriage to perform bridal duty. Although it is not common, polygyny does happen, and cross-cousin marriages are frequently chosen. Although divorce is uncommon, it is conceivable, and when a woman remarries, her former husband receives bridewealth from her new husband's family rather than the husband directly.

If a woman is severely mistreated, she may file for divorce. There are inheritance customs for sororates and widows; the sororate does not need to be wealthy. A widow returns to her family and receives her bridewealth back if she chooses not to inherit from her husband's family. In the past, adultery resulted in fines for the guy but was typically insufficient for divorce unless it happened repeatedly, but incest was punishable by death.
