= Pwani Region =

Region of Tanzania

Pwani Region Mkoa wa Pwani (Swahili)
- Region
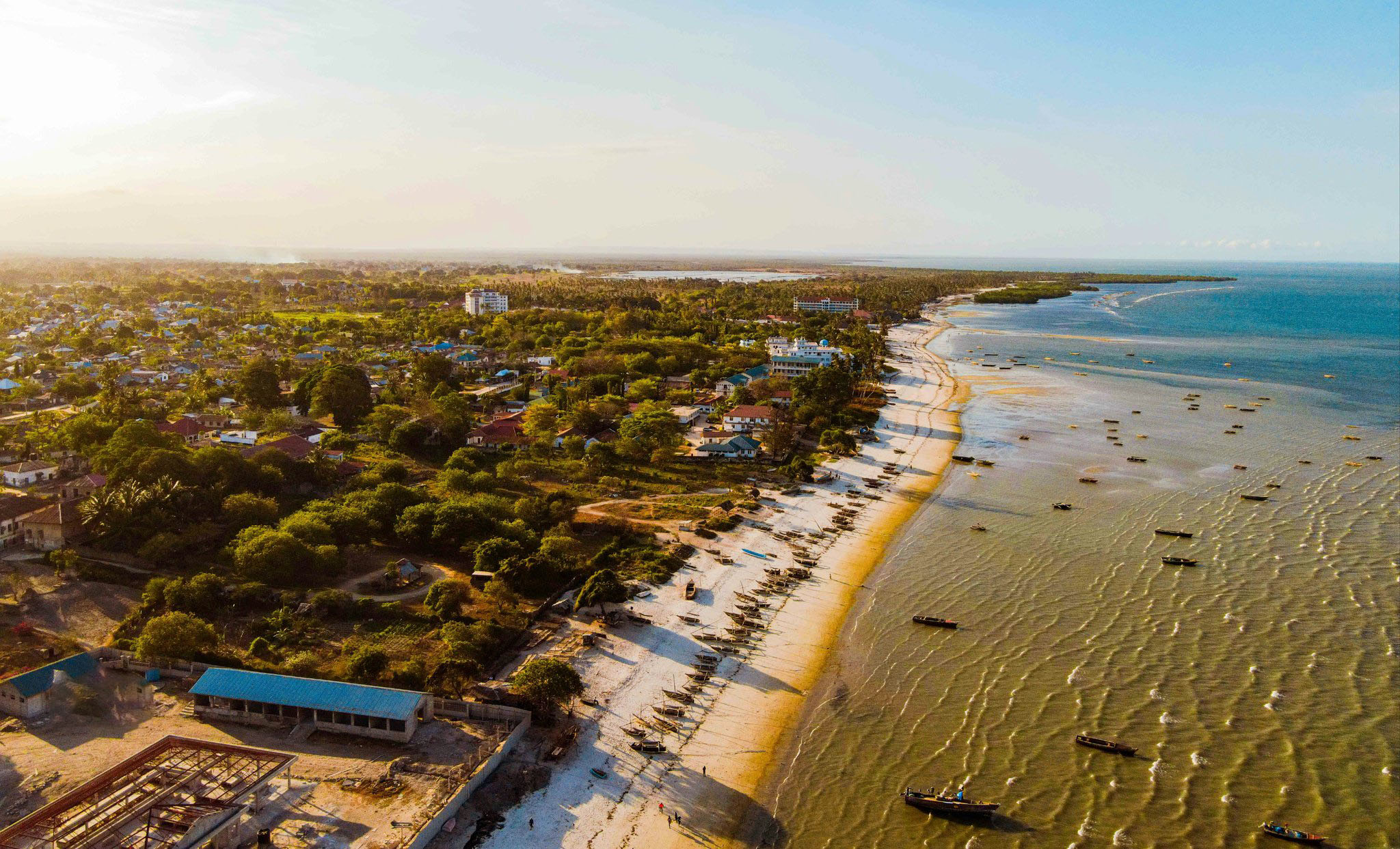
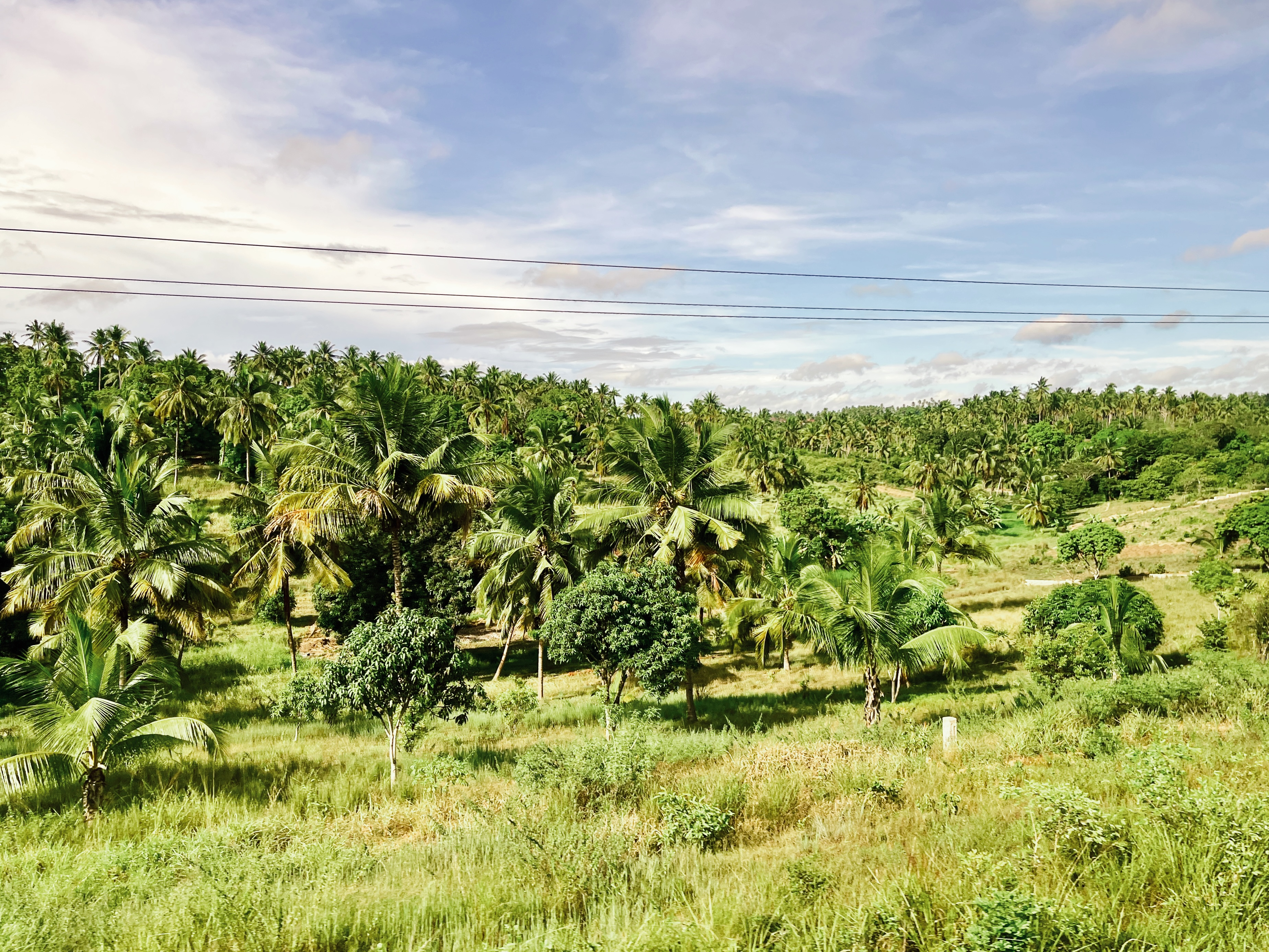
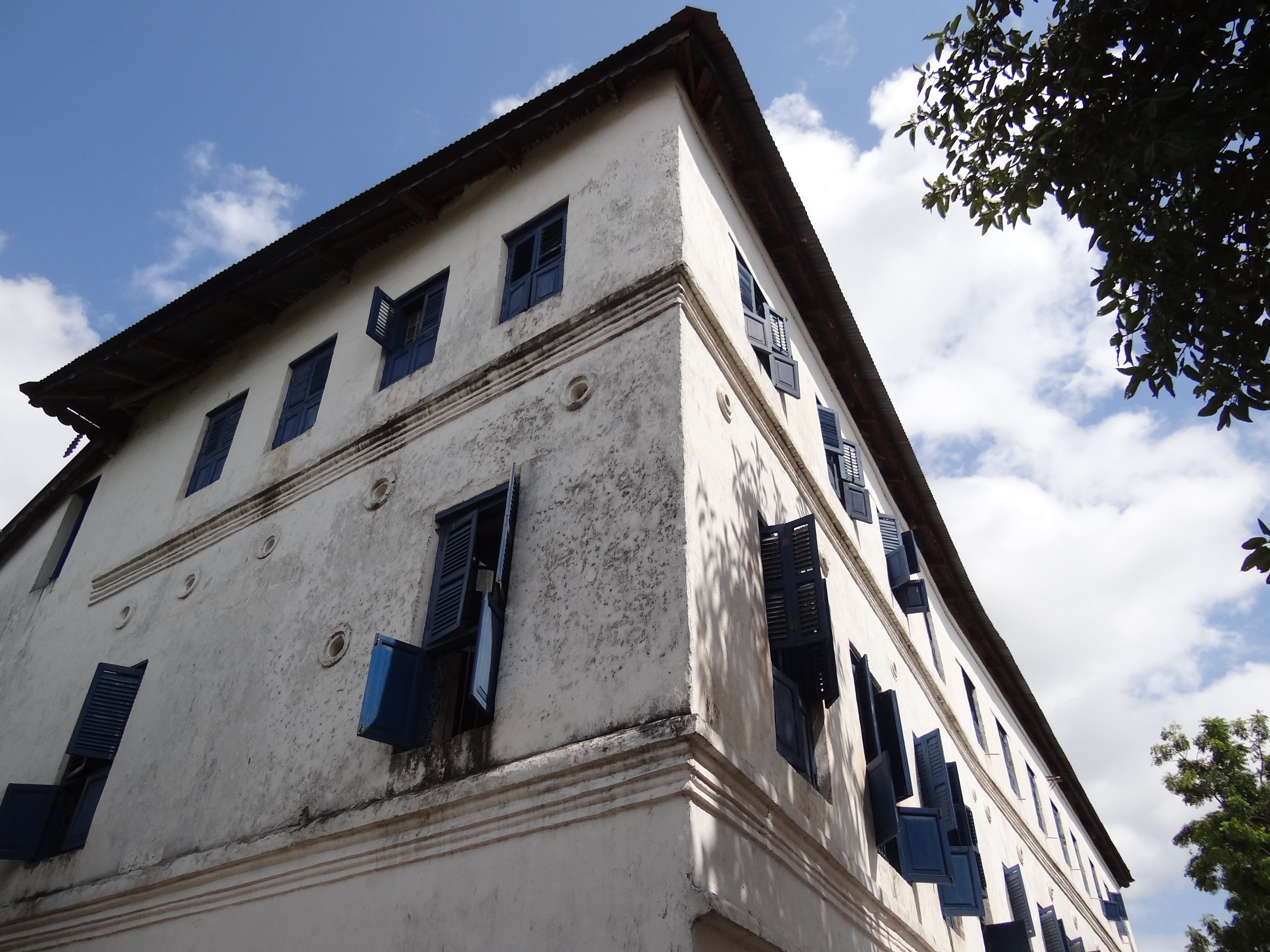
- From top to bottom: Bird's eye view of Bagamoyo District, Coconut landscape of Mkuranga District and Bagamoyo
- Etymology: The Coast
- Nickname: Beautiful Pwani
- Location in Tanzania
- Coordinates: 7°19′25.68″S 38°49′13.8″E
- Country: Tanzania
- Zone: Coastal
- Administrative Region: 1972
- Capital: Kibaha
- Districts: List: Bagamoyo District; Chalinze District; Kibaha District; Kibaha Urban District; Kibiti District; Kisarawe District; Mafia District; Mkuranga District; Rufiji District

Government
  - Regional Commissioner: Abubakar Kunenge

Area
  - Total: 32,547 km^{2} (12,566 sq mi)
  - Rank: 13th of 31
- Highest elevation (Pongwe): 874 m (2,867 ft)

Population (2022)
  - Total: 2,024,947
  - Rank: 15th of 31
  - Density: 62.216/km^{2} (161.14/sq mi)
- Demonym: Pwanian

Ethnic groups
  - Settler: Swahili
  - Native: Zaramo, Ndengereko, Rufiji, Matumbi, Kwere, Doe & Zigua
- Time zone: UTC+3 (EAT)
- Postcode: 61xxx
- ISO 3166 code: TZ-19
- HDI (2021): 0.525 low · 16th of 25
- Website: Official website
- Symbols of Tanzania
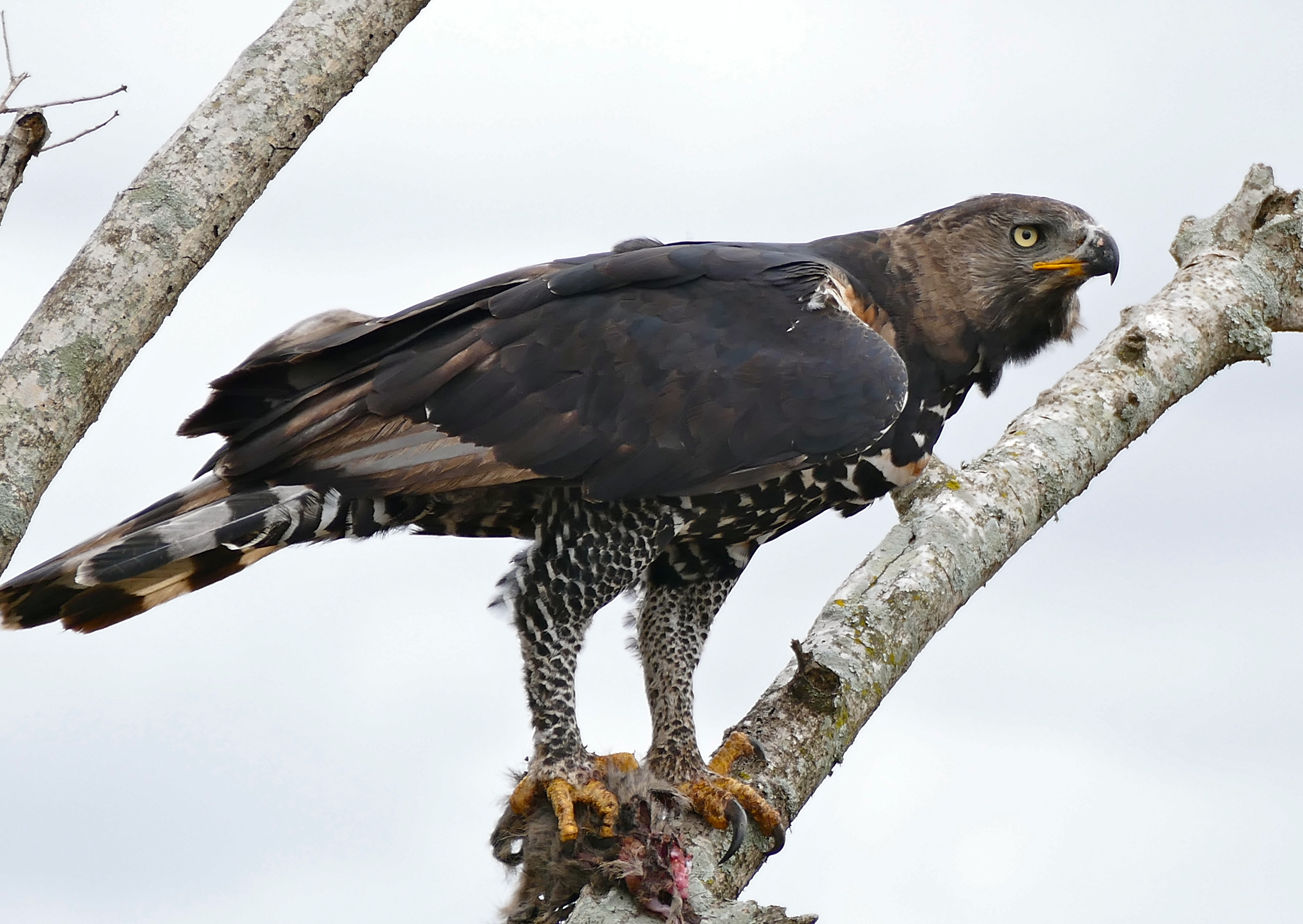
- Bird: African crowned eagle

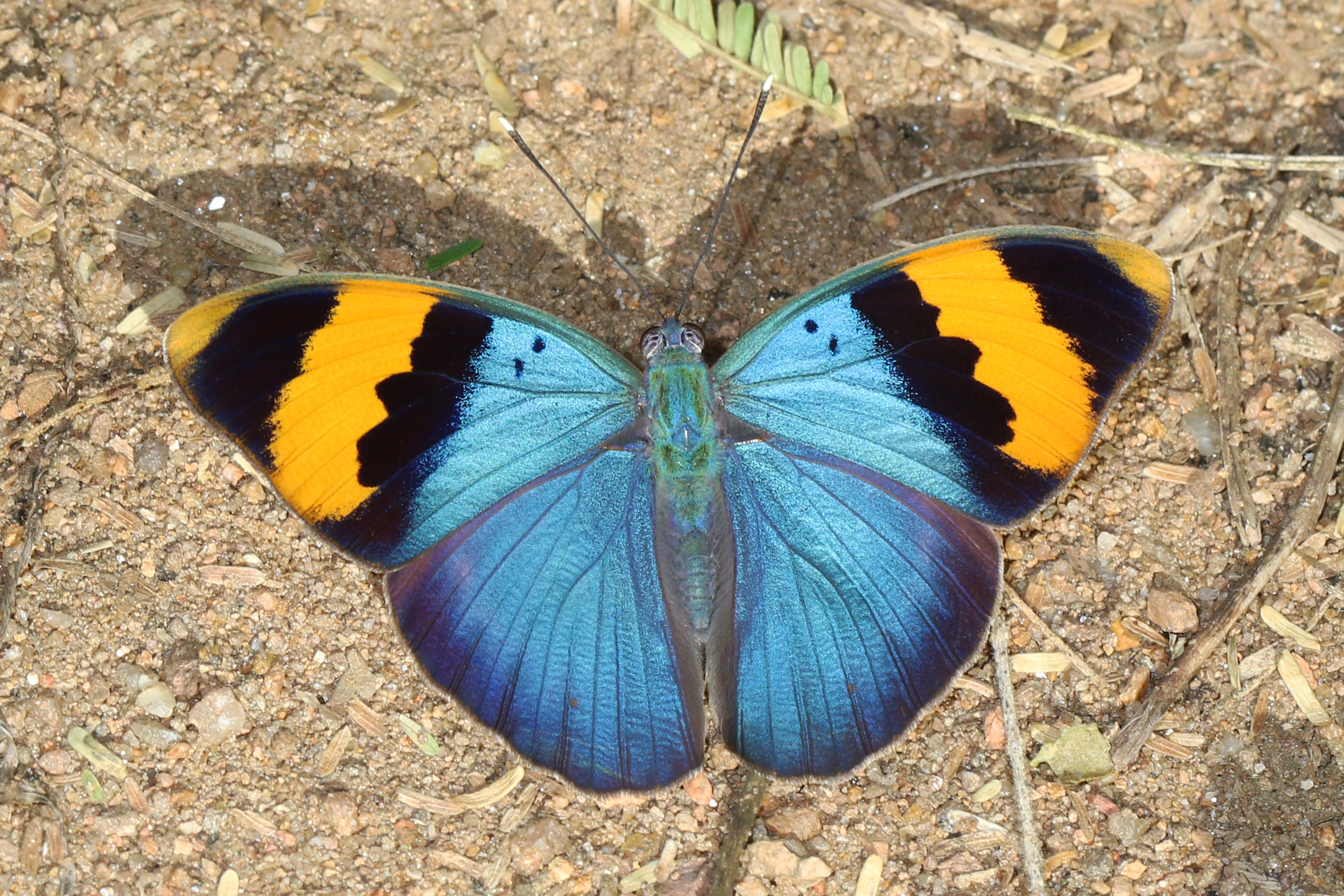
- Butterfly: Gold banded forester

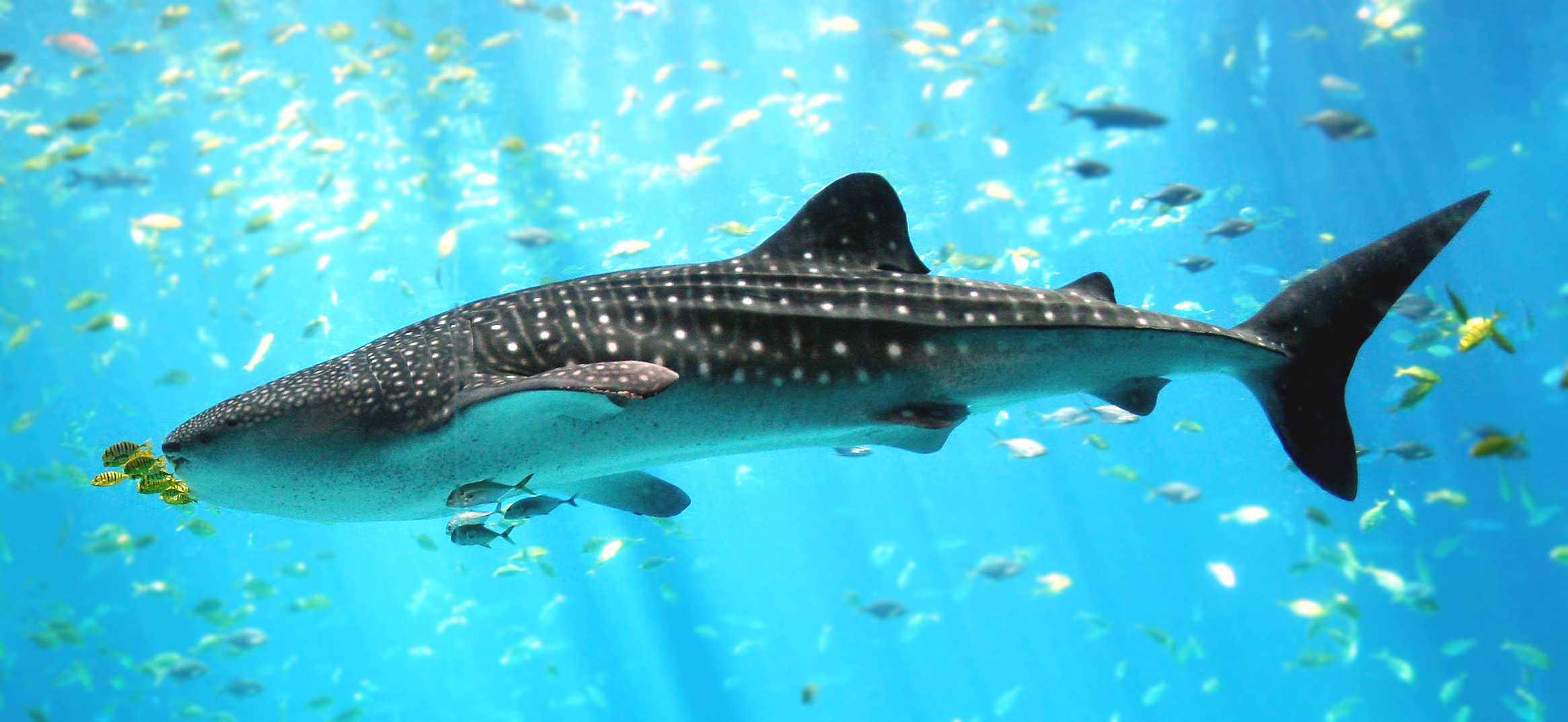
- Fish: Whale shark

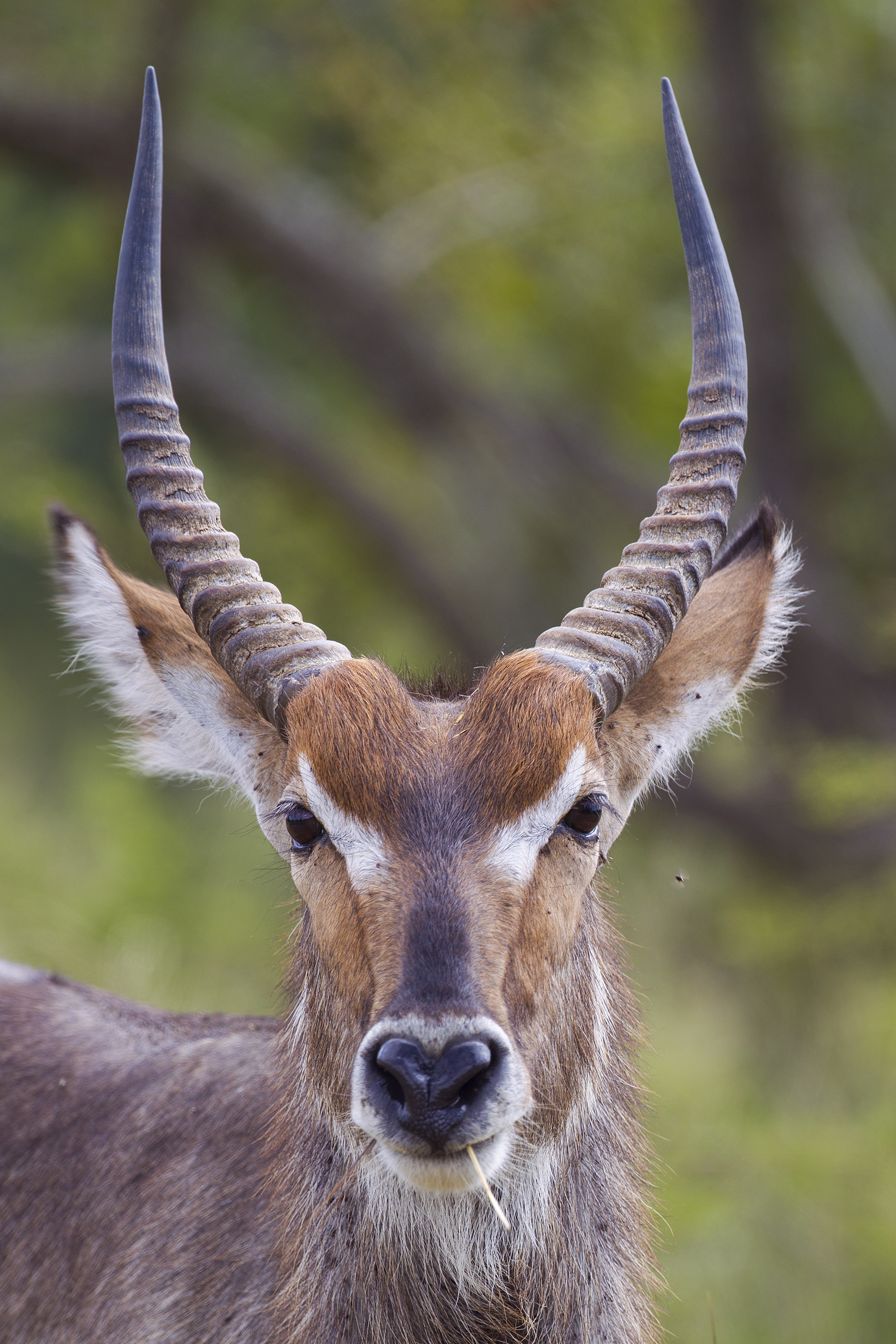
- Mammal: Waterbuck

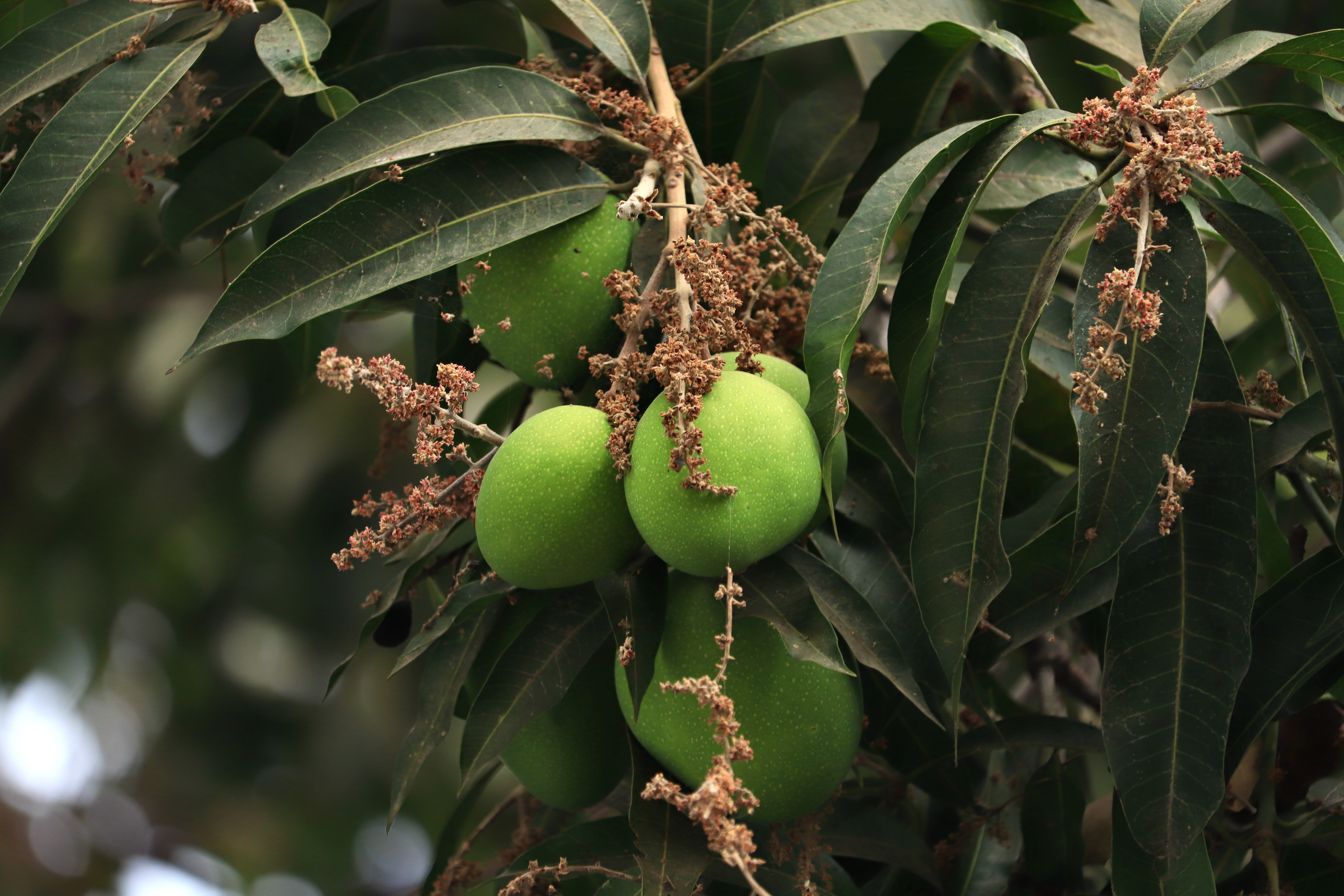
- Tree: Mango

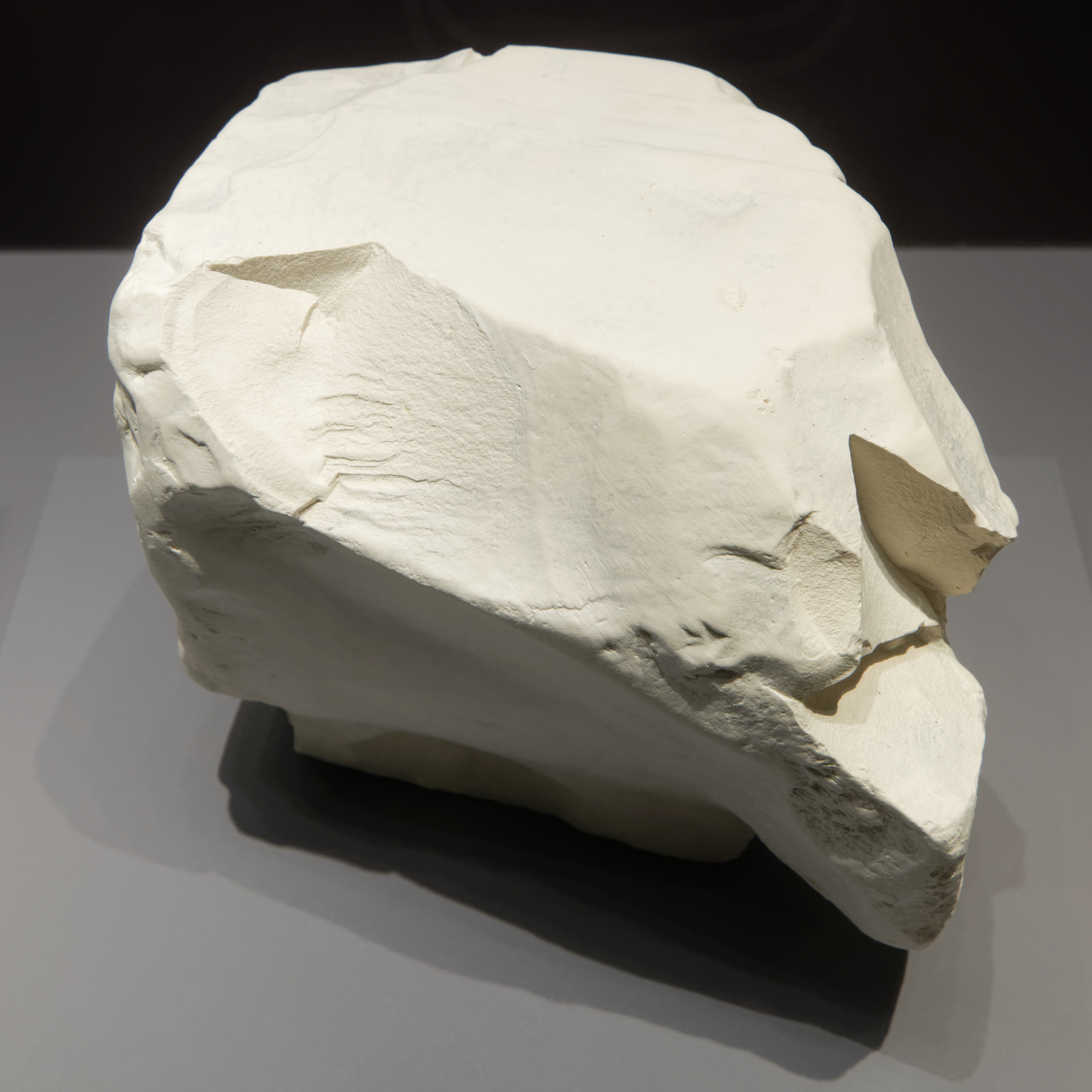
- Mineral: Kaolin

Pwani Region (Swahili: Mkoa wa Pwani) is one of Tanzania's 31 administrative regions. The Swahili word pwani means 'coast'. With the town of Kibaha serving as the capital, the region borders the Tanga Region to the north, Morogoro Region to the west, Lindi Region to the south, and surrounds Dar es Salaam Region to the east. The Indian Ocean also borders the region to its northeast and southeast. The region is home to Mafia Island, the Rufiji delta and Saadani National Park. The region is home to Bagamoyo town, a historical Swahili settlement, and the first colonial capital of German East Africa. According to the 2012 national census, the region had a population of 1,098,668, which was slightly lower than the pre-census projection of 1,110,917. From 2002 to 2012, the region's 2.2 percent average annual population growth rate was the seventeenth-highest in the country. It was also the 21st most densely populated region with 34 people per square kilometre. According to the 2022 census the population had nearly doubled to 2,024,947. The region is slightly larger than Belgium (32,133 square kilometres (12,407 mi^{2})).

== Population ==
The native peoples of the Pwani Region are the Zaramo, Kwere, Doe, Ndengereko, Zigua, and Rufiji. The Zaramo are the dominant people group in Pwani Region and are native to central Pwani, specifically in Kisarawe, Kibaha, Mkuranga, and Bagamoyo districts. The second-largest group in terms of the territory is the Rufiji people who are native to Rufiji and Kibiti districts. The Kwere and Doe are native to Bagamoyo District and also southern Zigua people. In 2012, the region had 1,098,668 residents, up from 885,017 in the 2002 Population Census, indicating a considerable increase of 213,651 individuals (24.1%) during the intercensal period. The region has a population of 2.5 percent of Tanzania's overall population. When compared to other regions on the Mainland, the Coast Region ranks fifth least populated, followed by Iringa, Lindi, Njombe, and Katavi. Between 1988 and 2002, the population of the Pwani Region increased at a rate of 2.4 percent each year. Between 2002 and 2012, the annual growth rate fell to an average of 2.2 percent.

Census	Population
1978	516,586
1988	636,103
2002	885,017
2012	1,098,668
2022	2,024,947

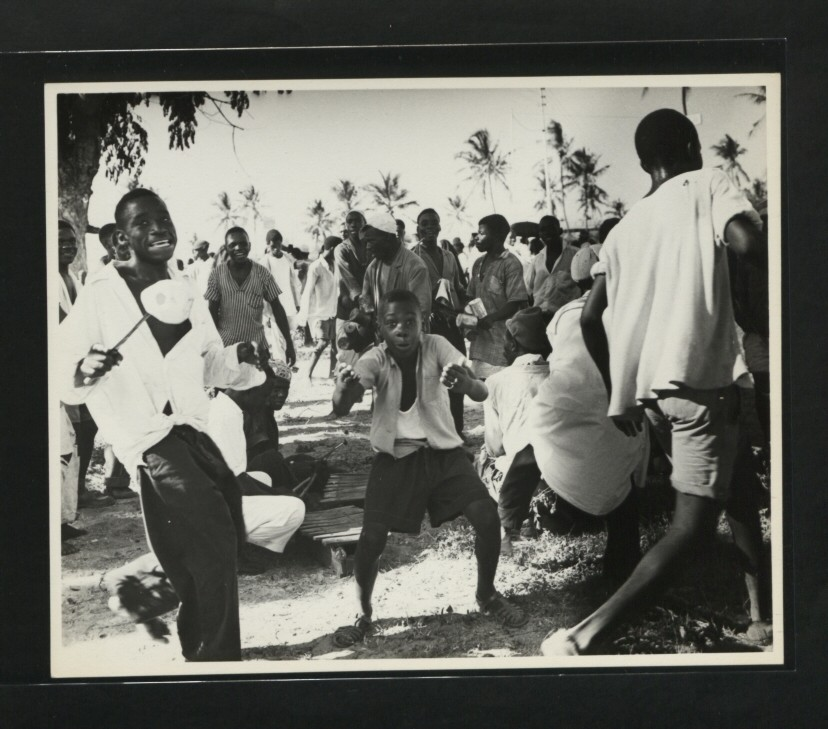
Zaramo Dance 1960s

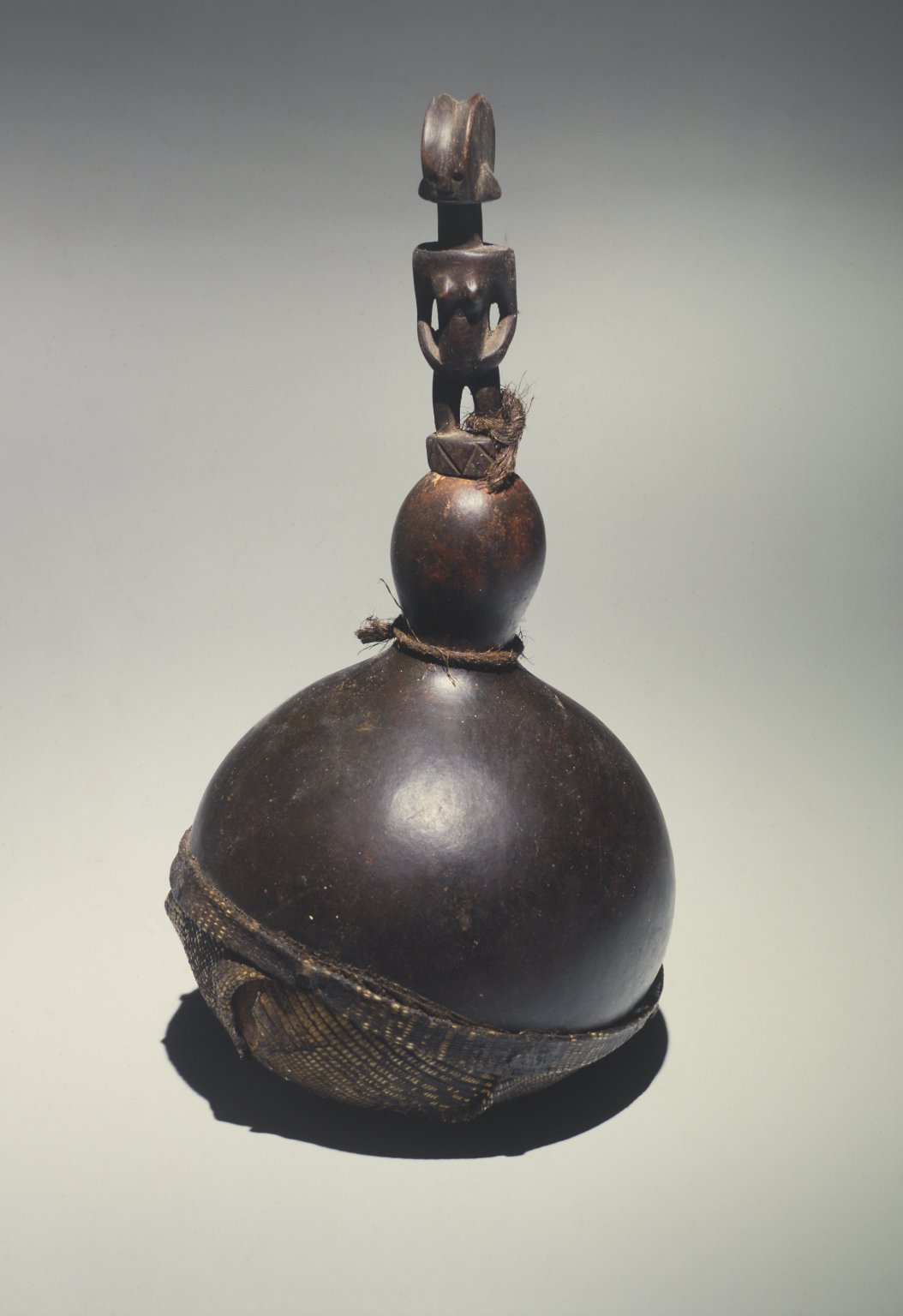
Brooklyn Museum 1991.228.2 Zaramo Container

== Economy ==
Agriculture remains the mainstay of the Pwani Region's economy. Commercial and peasant farming are practiced, with the latter taking precedence. Crop farming employed 82 percent of the economically active population in the 2007/08 Coast area agriculture sample census report, followed by livestock husbandry (2 percent), and fishing (2%). The remaining 12% worked in non-farming activities such as trade and repairs. Agriculture generates the majority of the region's monetary income, primarily through the sale of coconuts, oranges, mango, and cassava on a large scale.

== Administrative divisions ==
=== Districts ===
As of 2012, Pwani Region is divided into six districts, each administered by a council:

Districts of Pwani Region
Bagamoyo District	311,740
Kibaha District	128,488
Kibaha Urban District	70,209
Kisarawe District	101,598
Mafia District	46,438
Mkuranga District	222,921
Rufiji District	217,274
Total	1,098,668

However, additional districts have been added since 2012; Kibiti District and Chalinze District.

== Education ==
Secondary (high) schools operated by the ministry of education in Pwani Region include:

1. Kibaha Secondary School (Kibaha District)
2. Kibiti Secondary School (Rufiji District)
3. Minaki Secondary School (Kisarawe District) — this school was established in Kisarawe in 1925, as St. Andrews College. Prior to that, it traces its history back to a Universities' Mission to Central Africa mission school established in Kiungani, Zanzibar, in 1869.

== Notable people from Pwani Region ==
- Ali Hassan Mwinyi, 2nd President of Tanzania
- Jakaya Kikwete, 4th President of Tanzania
- Mbosso, musician
