= Msimbazi River =

River in Dar es Salaam Region, Tanzania

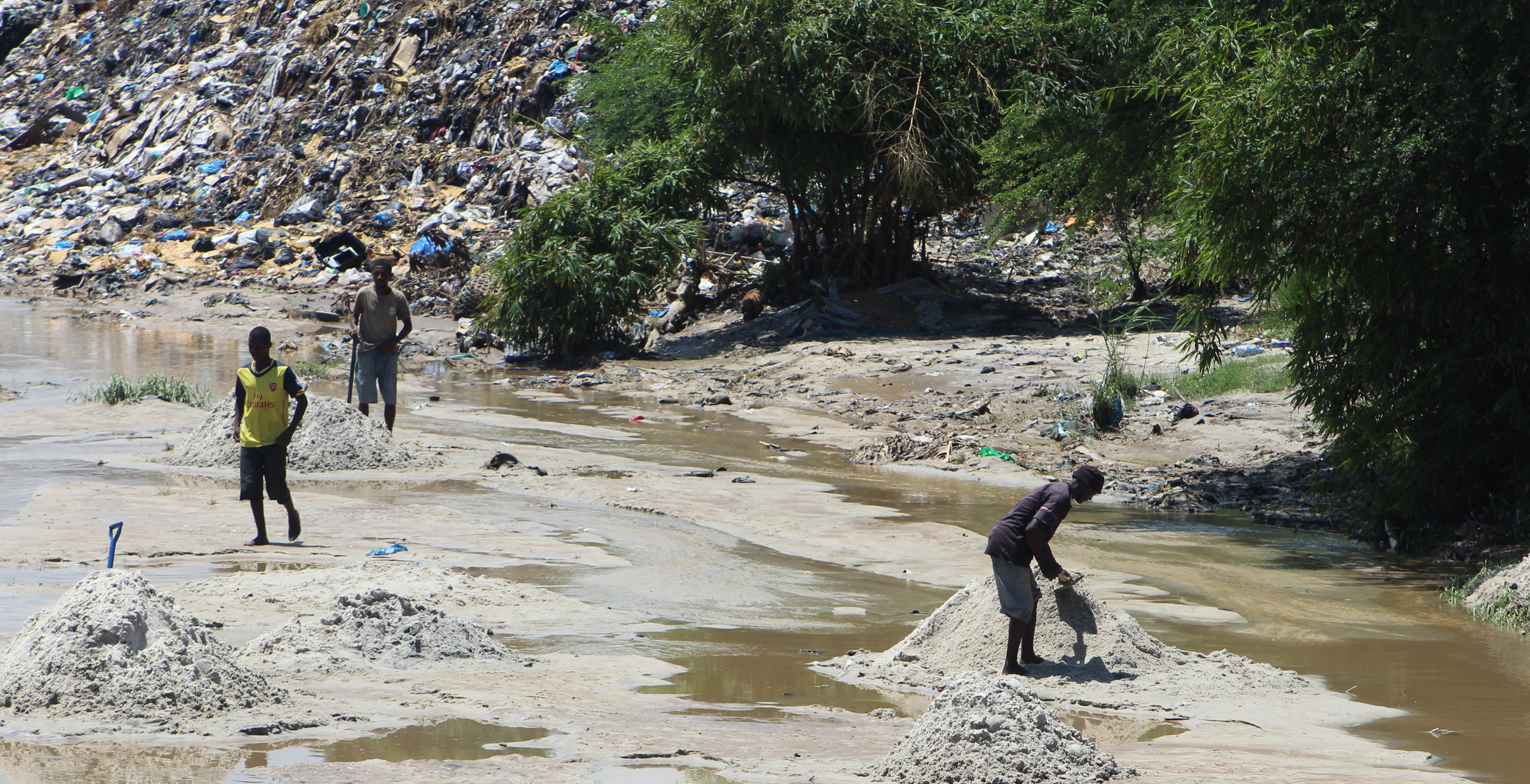
- Msimbazi River bed being exploited for sand and used a trash dump in background
- Native name: Mto Msimbazi (Swahili)

Location
- Country: Tanzania
- Region: Dar es Salaam Region & Pwani Region
- District: Kisarawe District, Ilala & Kinondoni
- Wards: Kwembe, Kisarawe, Gongolamboto, Pugu, Ukonga, Kipawa, Kinyerezi, Segerea, Vingunguti, Tabata, Buguruni, Kigogo, Ilala, Mchikichini, Mzimuni, Magomeni, Upanga West & Hananasif

Physical characteristics
- Source
  - location: Kisarawe, Kisarawe District, Pwani Region
- Mouth: Zanzibar Channel
  - location: Upanga West & Hananasif
  - coordinates: 06°47′46″S 39°16′54″E
- Length: 35 km (22 mi)
- Basin size: 271 km^{2} (105 sq mi)

Basin features
- River system: Msimbazi River Basin
- Tributaries
  - left: Sinza River, Lubungo (Ubungo) River, Luhanga River, Kinyerezi River, Zimbiri River, Tandale River and Makurumla River

Msimbazi River (Swahili: Mto Mbezi) is located in Dar es Salaam Region of Tanzania. It begins in Kisarawe ward, Kisarawe District and eventually drains into Zanzibar Channel at the border of Upanga West ward of Ilala MC and Hananasif ward of Kinondoni MC. The length of the Msimbazi River is about 35 kilometers. It flows eastward into the Zanzibar Channel of the Indian Ocean via the Pugu and Kazimzumbwi Forest Reserves, joining the Sinza, Ubungo, and Luhanga Rivers along the way.

It is a significant source of water for drinking, bathing, supporting industry, agriculture, and environmental protection for those living in Dar es Salaam Region over the decades. However, recently, industrial effluents and unauthorized sewage systems are jeopardizing the biological functions that rivers perform. Heavy metal pollution from industries harms the river's advantages in terms of functionality and even the traditional practice of irrigation of vegetable fields.

== Geography ==
The Msimbazi River and its tributaries originate in the Pugu Hills and Kazimzumbwi Forest Reserves in Kisarawe District, Pwani Region, and flow through the center of Dar es Salaam's in Ilala MC.

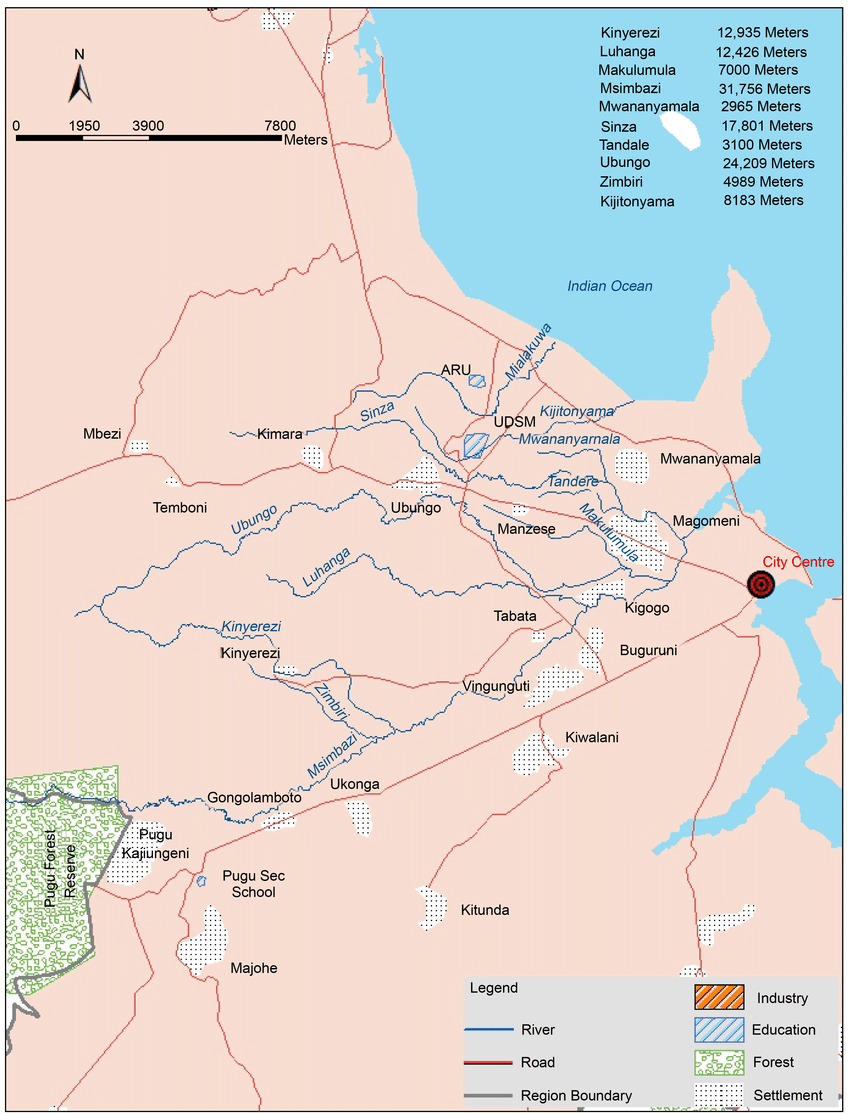
Msimbazi River and its main tributaries

=== River basin ===
With a land area of 271 km2, the Msimbazi basin makes up roughly one fifth of Dar es Salaam's total land area and is home to an estimated 1.6 million people (27% of the city's total population). The basin extends from the river's headwaters in the Pugu Forest Reserve eastward over a stretch that becomes more urbanized as the river gets closer to the ocean's mouth.

The lower basin, a large floodplain and wetland in the center of Dar es Salaam close to the city center, was formerly a thriving mangrove forest estuary but has recently begun to die back despite still being intact. Near the river's outflow to the sea, two of Dar es Salaam's four main thoroughfares—including the city's first operational Bus Rapid Transit (BRT) corridor—cross the main flood plain. Communities along the lower parts of the river, which frequently have poor incomes and live in haphazard settlements, rely heavily on easy access to the city's commercial center for their livelihoods and get access to nearby social services.

=== Historic annual flooding and fertility ===
The upper and middle catchments of the Msimbazi once had a sizable portion of natural forestland. When it rained heavily, the dense foliage cover prevented the underlying soil from eroding. Even though rivers like the Msimbazi are never static since they change gradually over many years and decades, the lack of excessive erosion and sedimentation left the river in a generally stable form in its natural state. Flooding was common during the 1800s and 1900s; in fact, the region's fertility is due to the nutrient-rich deposits that previous floods left behind. The use of the land around the river started to change gradually in the late 1980s and early 1990s as a result of rural-urban migration.

The 1997–1998 El Niño rains are frequently cited as the catalyst for the Msimbazi's catastrophic flooding. Since then, there have been large flooding incidents in 2009, 2010, 2011, 2014, 2015, 2017, and 2018. The flooding episodes have also gotten more regular and severe. Systems for managing land and planning have not been able to keep up with the rapid increase. Although the Msimbazi Basin was identified as hazardous territory in the 1979 Dar es Salaam Master Plan and a 60-meter buffer zone from a river's highwater mark was established by the Environmental Management Act, land use restrictions have mostly gone unenforced. Physical lines delineating a dangerous area weren't present, and the formal legal procedure for doing so wasn't followed.

== Threats ==
=== Metal contamination ===
The Msimbazi River has experienced environmental deterioration throughout the years, much like all the other waterways in the city. Sediments from Dar's rivers are contaminated, with Msimbazi and Kizinga river sediments being the most contaminated, according to the geo-accumulation index, contamination factor, degree of contamination, modified degree of contamination, potential contamination index, and environmental toxicity quotient. This is true even though the enrichment factor shows varying levels of heavy metal contamination in rivers.

Metal contamination levels for Cd, Pb, Cr, Ni, Cu, Al, Mn, Fe, and Zn were assessed using sediments from the Kizinga, Mbezi, Msimbazi, and Mzinga coastal rivers. The Msimbazi River held the majority of the higher quantities of Cd, Pb, Cr, Al, Mn, Fe, and Zn. The Kizinga River has higher Ni and Cu values, but the Mbezi River had higher Mn concentrations. Mzinga River contains the least amount of metals overall, except Mn. The Kizinga River had the lowest mn concentrations.

=== Deforestation and uncontrolled urbanization ===
Stormwater runoff has grown in the Msimbazi Basin as a result of decreased natural water retention capacity due to human activity, particularly deforestation and urbanization. The primary cause of the rising frequency of flooding in the rivers and streams that make up the river system is due to this. The Basin's tree cover has dramatically decreased. To make room for agriculture, urban growth, and cooking fuel, trees have been cut down at alarming rates, leaving behind bushland with only 10% of a forest's ability for soil-fixing and rainwater infiltration. According to one study at the river's source, the closed forest canopy in the Pugu and Kazimzumbwi Forest Reserves shrunk by more than a quarter (25 and 31%, respectively) over a 15-year period. Less than 400 of Pugu and Kazimzumbwi reserve's 2,180 hectares may be deemed real forest, indicating that the majority of the forest cover has indeed been removed. Similar to this, only 900 of the 4,887 hectares in the Kazimzumbwi Forest Reserve can currently be classed as genuine forest.

The mangroves' air roots have been buried as a result of the Msimbazi River's significant sedimentation, and this "asphyxiation" has a detrimental effect on the health of the trees. Since it no longer extends as far as Jangwani Bridge, high tide now only comes a few hundred meters ashore. Because of the accumulation of sediment to a height above the tidal level, much of the wetland region that surrounds the river channel is dry even during high tide. The result is that the more inland mangroves are no longer able to receive seawater, and significant portions of the mangrove forest have withered away. There is a dearth of information about the condition of the mangrove forest reserve.The mangrove protected area is not formally physically defined, even though it is protected by the 2002 Forest Act and the ban on chopping down mangroves is strictly enforced.

=== Pollution ===
Unregulated sanitary waste disposal practices significantly contaminate flood waters. The prevalence of unlawful discharge into rivers and wetlands has been confirmed through interviews with NGOs and companies that focus on sanitation. Another typical emptying technique is to purposefully flood or unplug latrines during heavy downpours, which flushes excrement out of the pit and into nearby communities and waterways. The Msimbazi River has very low flows during the dry season, and this makes the water extremely filthy.Industrial waste and pollution have ruined a freshwater ecosystem; large stretches of the river can no longer support fish populations that were there until recently.

The most polluted sections of the Msimbazi downstream of Vingunguti and its tributaries had pH levels as high as 12 (compared to the legal standard of 8.5), a level that causes severe burns to skin, and Chromium (VI) at 75 times the legal limit for wastewater discharges. Chromium VI is extremely toxic and can cause cancer and birth defects with prolonged exposure. Evidence of fecal contamination that is more dangerous than what the World Health Organization considers safe for use in agriculture.

Municipal wastewater stabilization ponds at Vingunguti, textile and other industries, abattoirs, leachate from former dump sites, sewers and drainage from nearby homes that flow directly into the Msimbazi river, pit latrines that leak waste or overflow during rainstorms, transportation runoff (oil and gasoline), agricultural runoff (pesticides, fertilizers), and solid waste dumped directly into rivers are some of the sources of river pollution. A year-round health problem is poor water quality. In the river basin, hundreds of farmers cultivate leafy greens and other vegetables, and garden plots receive irrigation from shallow wells. The produce is sold in bulk to middlemen who then distribute it all across Dar es Salaam.
