= Msimbazi Drainage Channel =

Location
- Country: Tanzania
- State: Dar es Salaam Region

Physical characteristics
- Mouth: Indian Ocean

Basin features
- River system: Msimbazi River Basin
- Cities: Dar es Salaam
- Population: Approximately 1.6 million

The Msimbazi Drainage Channel is a major flood-control and stormwater-management corridor located within the Msimbazi River Basin in Dar es Salaam, Tanzania. It forms part of a broader urban flood-management system designed to improve hydraulic conveyance, reduce flood risk, and support climate resilience in one of the most densely populated watersheds in Tanzania.

== Location ==
The drainage corridor lies within the Msimbazi River Basin, an economically and environmentally significant urban catchment in Dar es Salaam. According to the World Bank, approximately 1.6 million people live within the basin area, which also contains critical transportation infrastructure connecting the central business district to other parts of the city.

== History ==
Historically, much of the lower Msimbazi Valley functioned as a natural wetland that absorbed seasonal floodwaters and conveyed runoff toward the Indian Ocean.

Rapid urbanization in Dar es Salaam increased development pressure on the floodplain, resulting in encroachment into flood-prone areas and modification of natural drainage processes.

== Flooding ==
Flooding in the Msimbazi Basin has intensified during recent decades. The World Bank reported that major flood events occurred in seven of the ten years preceding the launch of the Msimbazi Basin Development Project.

In 2019 alone, nine major flood events were recorded within the basin, affecting communities, transportation networks, economic activities, and public infrastructure.

== Infrastructure ==
The modern drainage system includes river-channel improvements, flood-retention facilities, sediment-management structures, riverbank-protection works, and upgrades to stormwater conveyance infrastructure.

Flood-control interventions planned under the basin development programme include river recontouring, floodplain excavation, construction of flood-retention areas, sediment traps, and hydraulic-capacity improvements.

== Msimbazi Basin Development Project ==
In 2022, the Government of Tanzania launched the Msimbazi Basin Development Project with financing from the International Development Association (IDA) of the World Bank Group.

The project aims to strengthen flood resilience and integrated urban development in the flood-prone Msimbazi River Basin.

The programme includes flood-control infrastructure, watershed restoration, preventative resettlement of vulnerable communities, institutional strengthening, and environmental rehabilitation initiatives.

== Environmental issues ==
Environmental degradation within the basin has been linked to deforestation, erosion, wetland degradation, solid-waste dumping, industrial effluents, and untreated sewage discharges.

These pressures have reduced the carrying capacity of the river and contributed to increased flood risk throughout the watershed.

== Economic importance ==
The basin contains transportation infrastructure of strategic importance to Dar es Salaam, including corridors linking the central business district to surrounding urban areas.

According to the World Bank, improved flood protection in the basin is expected to support long-term economic development and catalyze substantial investment in the area.

=== See also ===
- Msimbazi River
- Flood control
- Stormwater
- Dar es Salaam
