= Pemba Juu Island =

Island in Pwani Region of Tanzania

- Location on the Mafia Archipelago

Geography
- Location: Mafia Channel
- Coordinates: 7°30′54″S 39°24′29″E
- Length: 0.2 km (0.12 mi)
- Width: 0.08 km (0.05 mi)

Administration
- Tanzania
- Region: Pwani Region
- District: Mkuranga District
- Ward: Kisiju

Demographics
- Languages: Swahili
- Ethnic groups: Ndengereko & Rufiji

Pembaa Juu Island (Kisiwa cha Pemba Juu, in Swahili) is an island located in Kisiju ward of Mkuranga District in southern Pwani Region of Tanzania. The island is located just north of Koma Island and has three islets training off the south west tip of the Island.
