= Pugu, Ilala =

Ward of Ilala District, Dar es Salaam Region

Pugu Kata ya Pugu (Swahili)
- Ward of Ilala District
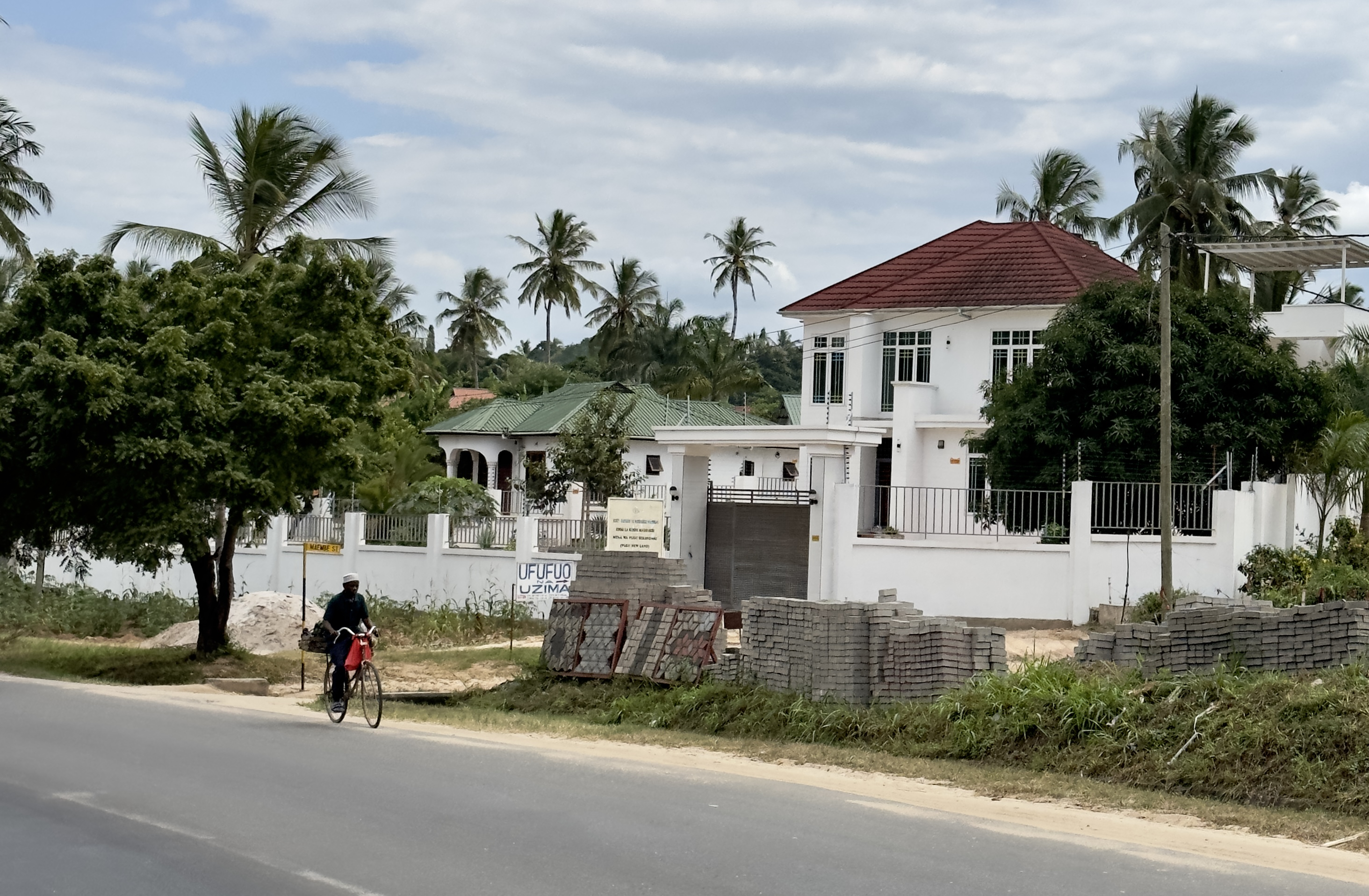
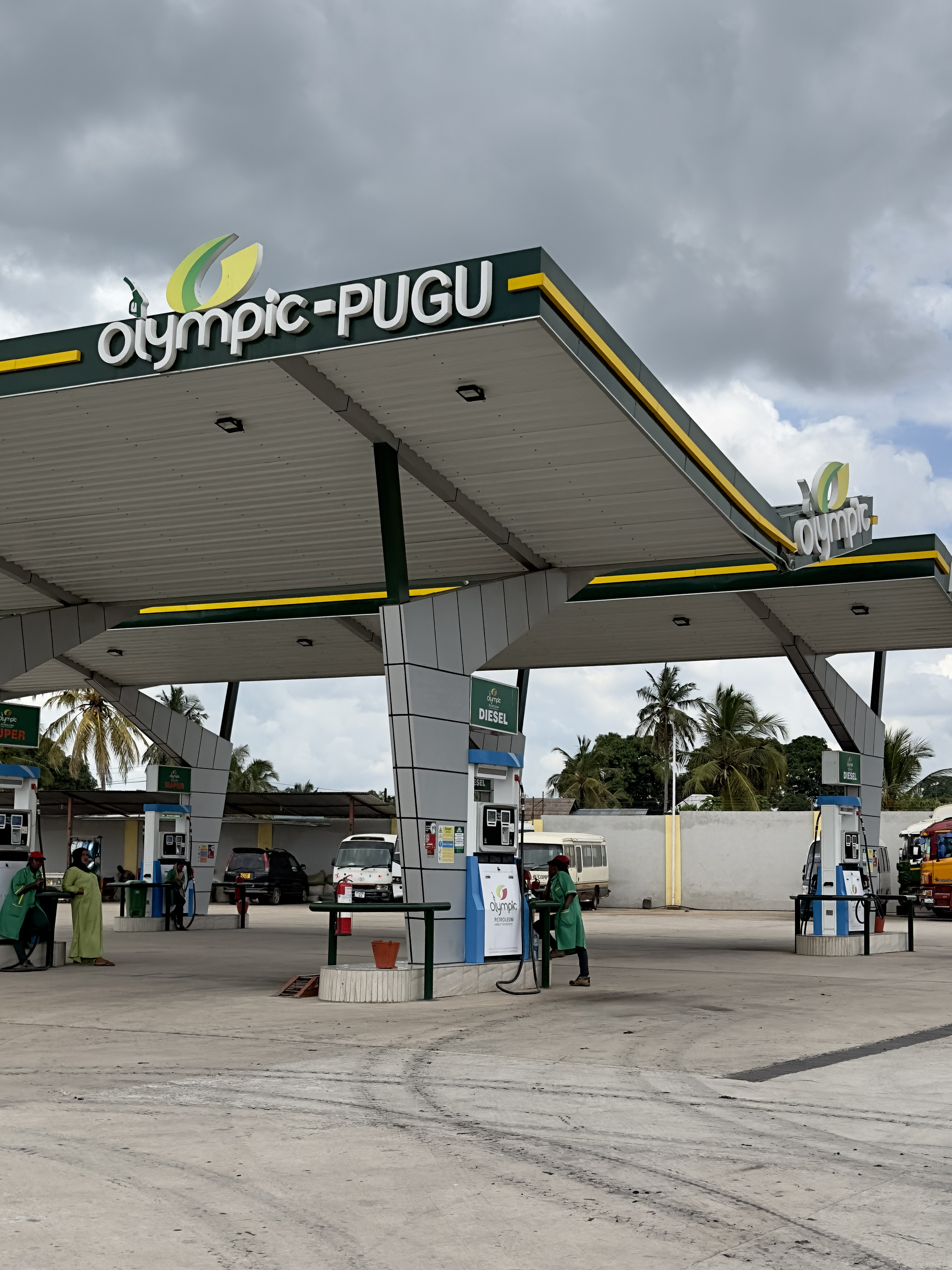
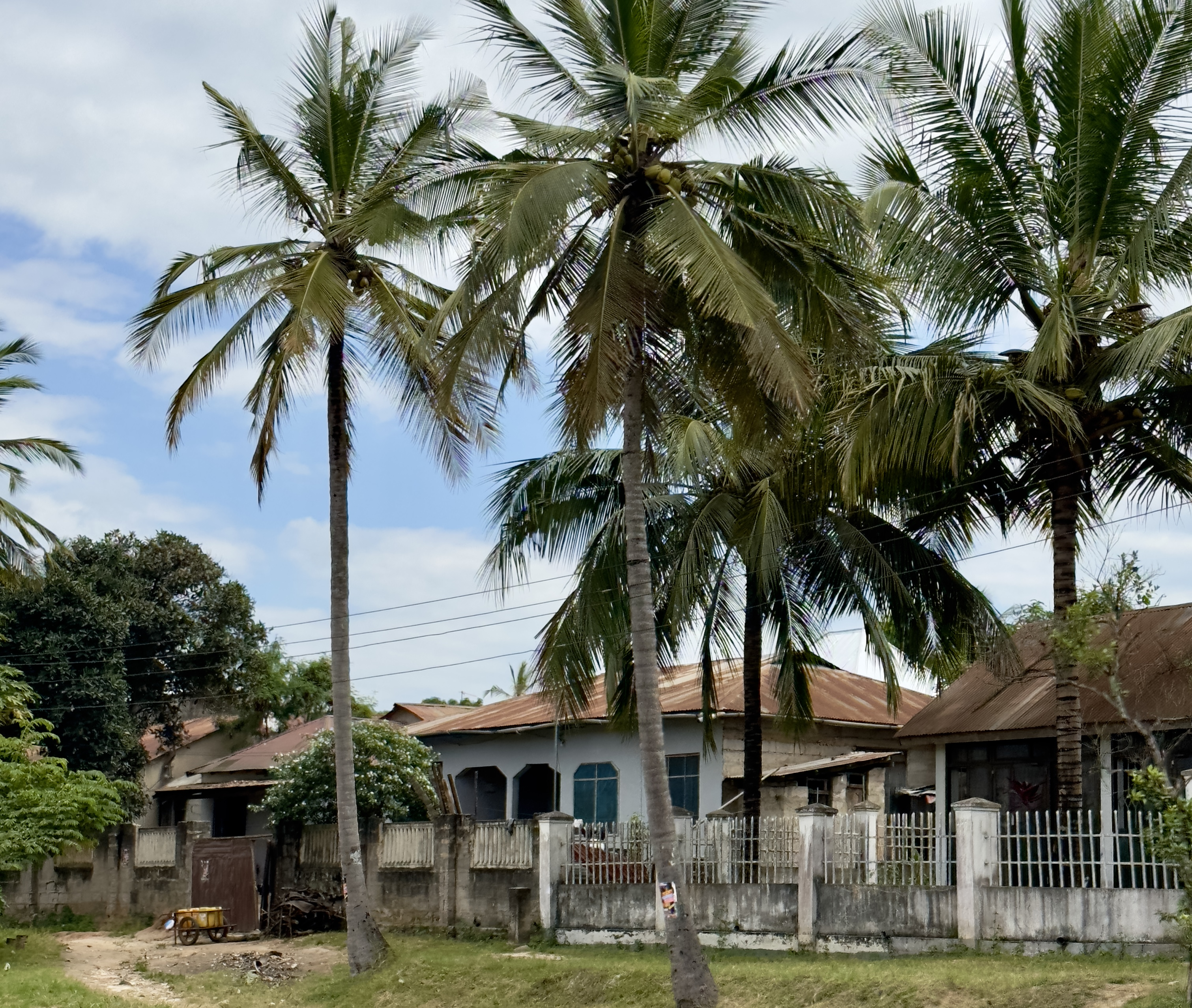
- From top to bottom: Posh homes in Pugu ward, Gas station in Pugu & old homes in Pugu ward
- Interactive map of Pugu
- Coordinates: 6°54′5.04″S 39°7′7.32″E
- Country: Tanzania
- Region: Dar es Salaam Region
- District: Ilala District

Area
  - Total: 30.8 km^{2} (11.9 sq mi)

Population (2012)
  - Total: 49,422

Ethnic groups
  - Settler: Swahili
  - Ancestral: Zaramo
- Tanzanian Postal Code: 12112

Pugu (Kata ya Pugu, in Swahili) is an administrative ward of the Ilala Municipical Council of the Dar es Salaam Region in Tanzania. Kinyerezi and Kwembe ward of Kinondoni MC form the ward's northern boundary. The ward is bordered by Majohe to the south and Gongolamboto to the east. In the west the ward is bordered by Kisarawe ward of Kisarawe District in the Pwani Region. The ward is named after the Pugu Hills, which form its western border and are home to the Pugu Hills Forest Reserve and the Kazimzumbwi Forest Reserve, two of some of the world's oldest forests. According to the 2012 census, the ward has a total population of 49,422.

== Administration ==
The postal code for the Pugu ward is 12112. The ward is divided into the following neighborhoods (Mitaa):

- Gombani
- Kigogo Fresh "A"
- Kigogo Fresh "B"

- Kinyamwezi
- Mustapha

=== Government ===
The ward, like every other ward in the country, has local government offices based on the population served.The Pugu Ward administration building houses a court as per the Ward Tribunal Act of 1988, including other vital departments for the administration the ward. The ward has the following administration offices:

- Pugu Police Station
- Pugu Government Office (Afisa Mtendaji)
- Pugu Ward Tribunal (Baraza La Kata) is a Department inside Ward Government Office

In the local government system of Tanzania, the ward is the smallest democratic unit. Each ward is composed of a committee of eight elected council members which include a chairperson, one salaried officer (with no voting rights), and an executive officer. One-third of seats are reserved for women councillors.

== Demographics ==
The ward serves as the Zaramo people's ancestral home, along with much of the district. As the city developed throughout time, the ward became into a cosmopolitan ward. In total, 49,422 people called the ward home in 2012.

== Education and health ==
=== Education ===
The ward is home to these educational institutions

- Pugu Primary School
- Mikongeni Primary School
- Kigogo Fresh Primary School
- Kinyamwezi Secondary School
- Green Hill Secondary School
- Aaron Harris Secondary School
- Pugu Secondary School
- Gift Primary School
- Bangulo Primary School
- Bangulo Secondary School

=== Healthcare ===
The ward is home to the following health institutions:

- Pugu Kajiungeni Health Center
- Glory to God Health Center, Pugu.
- Komba Medical Center, Pugu.
