= Kwale Island, Pwani =

Island in Pwani Region of Tanzania

Kwale Island
- Location within Tanzania

Geography
- Location: Mafia Channel
- Coordinates: 7°24′42″S 39°23′43″E
- Length: 4.0 km (2.49 mi)
- Width: 0.9 km (0.56 mi)

Administration
- Tanzania
- Region: Pwani Region
- District: Mkuranga District
- Ward: Kisiju

Demographics
- Languages: Swahili
- Ethnic groups: Ndengereko & Rufiji

Kwale Island also known as Kuvala Island (Kisiwa cha Kwale, in Swahili) is a historic island located inside the Mafia Channel, in Kisiju ward of Mkuranga District in southern Pwani Region of Tanzania. 7.1 square kilometres (2.7 square miles) is the size of Kwale Island.

== History ==
The island was first settled by Bantu fisherman from the mainland. Only eight hectares of the island's western tip have been occupied since the beginning of the first millennium AD, according to the assessment by Felix Chami. It was observed that the extreme eastern tip, which is around three hectares, has been designated for burial, a mosque, and a port since the 14th century AD. The area that is currently settled is further inland.

It can be inferred that, if any, only a very small number of Bantu people lived on the island between the fifth and ninth centuries AD. The second significant settlement on the island started around the 10th century, when trading connections with other coastal villages were made, as evidenced by the discovery of several imports and a Kilwa currency from the 13th century AD. This occupation followed the end of the EIW occupation on the island. The Island of Kwale appears to have been the only Swahili town in the area at the time Ibn Majid wrote his book in the 15th century for import-export.

== Conservation ==
The island has a 300-hectare (741-acre) mangrove forest, and the nearby marine waters of the Mafia Channel are a well-known ecological hotspot. Along the East African Coast, you can find different turtle species, whale sharks, migratory humpback whales, and the only resident dugong population. The huge coral reefs, mangroves, and seagrass beds are vital to the island's inhabitants.

An initiative to improve the management of coastal and marine resources is being launched by the regional organisations like Action for Conservation, Research and Development in Africa and Umoja wa Wavuvi Wadogo Wadogo Dar es Salaam (Artisanal fishermen of Dar es Salaam). The mangrove forest of Kwale Island and other wildlife, including turtles, dugongs, and whale sharks, are currently being protected.

The 300 hectare (741 acre) mangrove forest will be preserved by the community for at least ten years. As payment, Seacology will build a 600 cubic metre (158,503 gallon) cistern to collect rainwater and store it for the dry season. The majority of islanders do not have access to drinkable water, and there are no freshwater sources on the island. The island's children in particular suffer from health issues brought on by the absence of potable water. Additionally, Seacology will provide funding for conservation-related initiatives including mangrove restoration and protected area designation.
