= Mkuranga District =

District of Pwani Region, Tanzania

Mkuranga District Wilaya ya Mkuranga (Swahili)
- District of Pwani
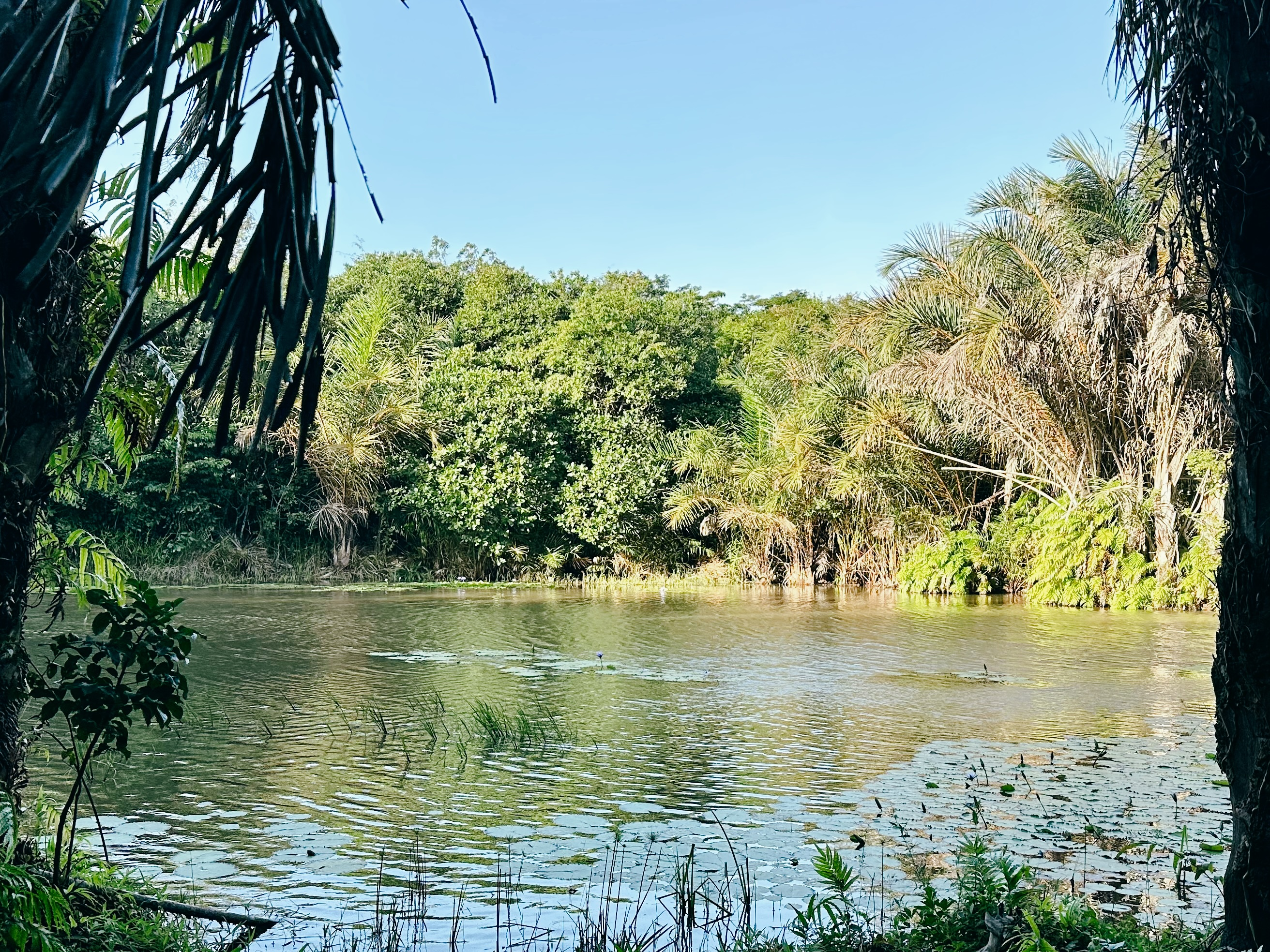
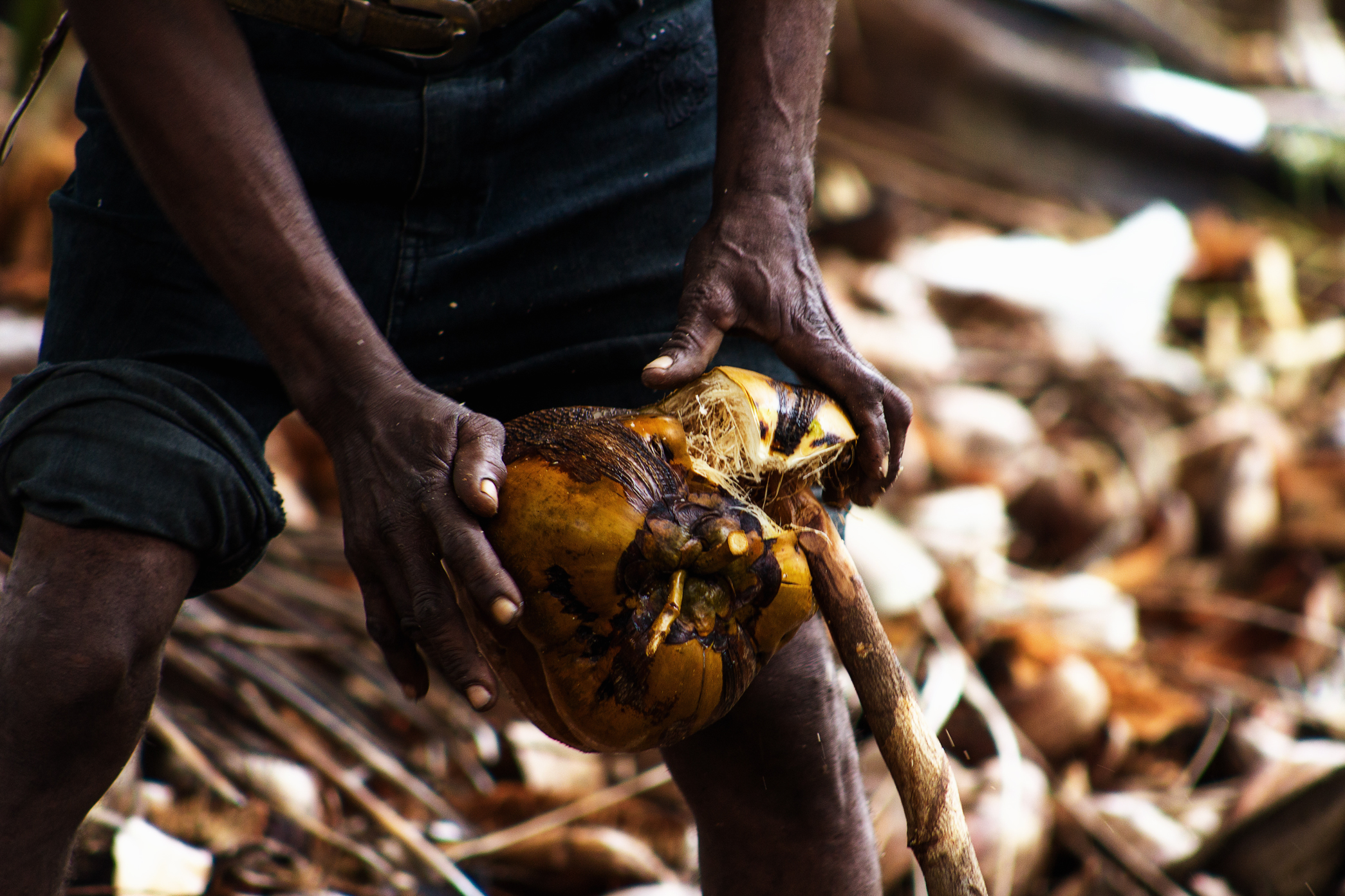
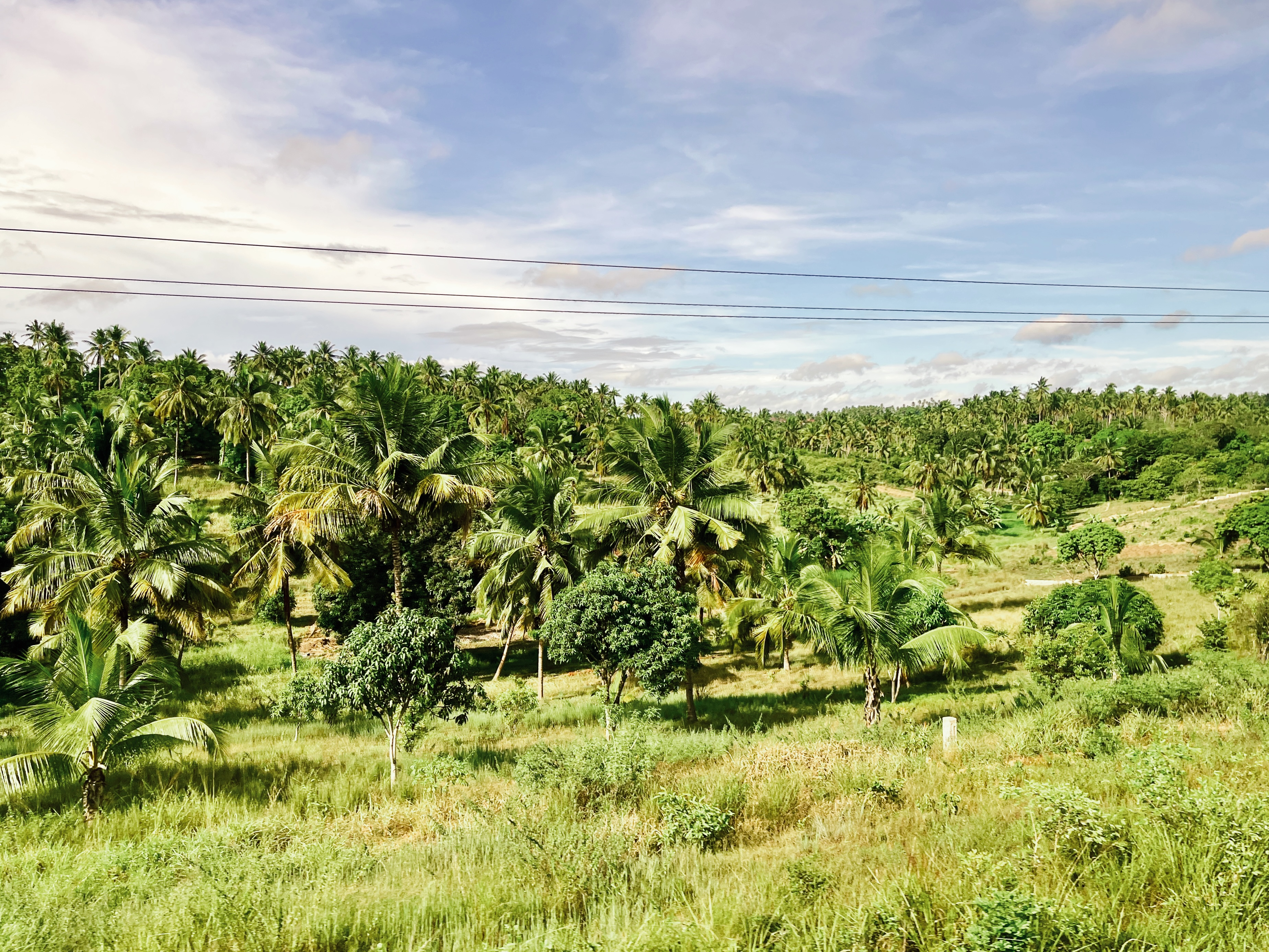
- From top to bottom: lake Mweleni in Vikindu Forest Reserve of Mkuranga, Man processing coconut in Mkuranga & Coconut groves in Vikindu ward of Mkuranga District
- Nickname: Pwani's fertile coast
- Mkuranga District in Pwani
- Coordinates: 7°7′0″S 39°12′0″E
- Country: Tanzania
- Region: Pwani Region
- Named for: Mkuranga Town
- Capital: Mkuranga

Area
  - Total: 2,827 km^{2} (1,092 sq mi)
  - Rank: 5th in Pwani

Population (2012)
  - Total: 222,921
  - Rank: 1st in Pwani
  - Density: 78.85/km^{2} (204.2/sq mi)
- Demonym: Mkurangan

Ethnic groups
  - Settler: Swahili
  - Native: Zaramo & Ndengereko
- Time zone: UTC+3 (EAT)
- Tanzanian Postcode: 615
- Website: Mkuranga District Council
- Symbols of Tanzania
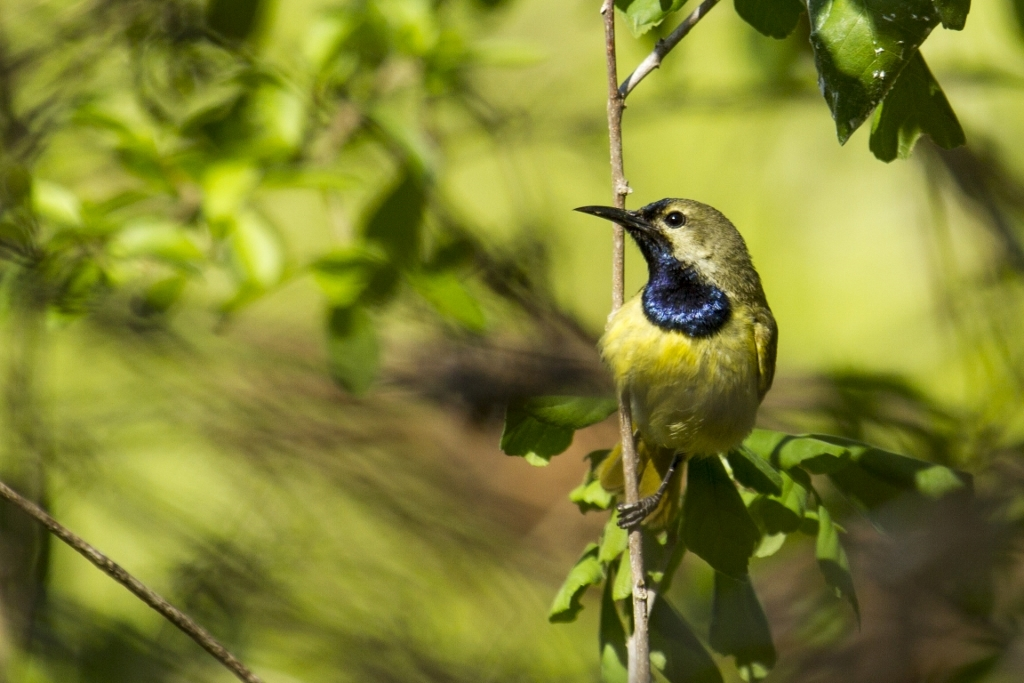
- Bird: Plain-backed sunbird

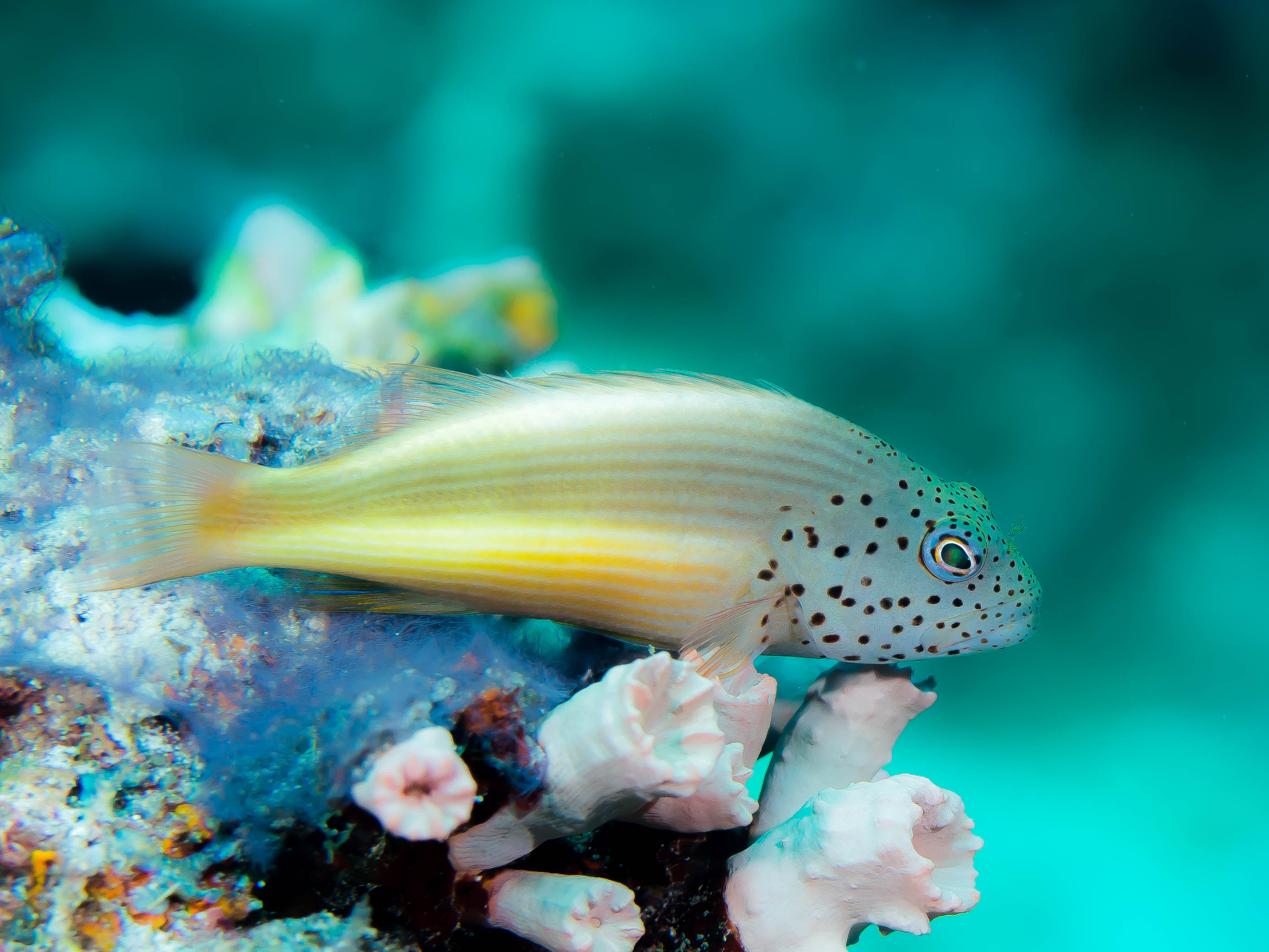
- Fish: Freckled hawkfish

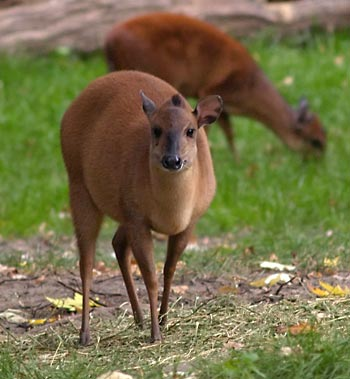
- Mammal: Red forest duiker

Mkuranga District Council (Swahili: Wilaya ya Mkuranga) is one of eight administrative districts of Pwani Region in Tanzania. The District covers an area of 2,827 km^{2} (1,092 sq mi). It is bordered to the north by Dar es Salaam's Kigamboni, Temeke and Ilala Districts. To the east by the Mafia Channel, to the south by Kibiti District, and to the west by Kisarawe District. The district is comparable in size to the land area of Samoa. The town of Mkuranga serves as its administrative capital. The district is home to the Vikindu Forest Reserve, one of last remaining East African coastal forests. In 2016 the Tanzania National Bureau of Statistics report the population of Mkuranga District were 243,062 people in the district, from 222,921 in 2012.

== Administration ==
The Mkuranga District Council has 18 wards, 121 registered villages, and 463 hamlets. It is organised into 4 administrative divisions.

- Bupu
- Kimanzichana
- Kisiju
- Kitomondo
- Lukanga
- Magawa
- Mbezi
- Mkamba
- Mkuranga
- Mwalusembe
- Nyamato
- Panzuo
- Shungubweni
- Tambani
- Vikindu
- Kiparang'anda
- Njianne
- Vianzi

== Geography ==
The Mkuranga district has a total area of 2,432 km2 (243,200 ha), of which 1,985 km2 (198,500 ha) is on the mainland and 447 km2 (44,700 ha) is covered by the Mafia Channel. The area of the mainland that is covered by natural reserves is 51 km2 (5,100 Ha). 1,934 km2 (193,400 ha) of land is suitable for cultivation, whereas 1662.3 km2 (166,230 ha), or 86% of the arable land, is under cultivation. The district is known for growing both cash crops like cashew nuts, coconuts, mangoes, pawpaw, watermelon, pineapples, jackfruit, and passionfruit as well as food crops like cassava, rice, maize, sweet potatoes, and legumes, owing to its nickname "the fertile coast". Livestock is on limited basis, cattle, goats, and chickens are raised. There are five islands in Mkuranga: North Fanjove Island, Kwale Island, Koma Island, and Pemba Juu Island.

Coastal Savanna, Miyombo woodland, coastal forest, mangroves, and swampy vegetation are among the types of vegetation found in the district. The district's water resources include one permanent river, Kogamimba River, many seasonal rivers, including Mbezi, Mzinga, and Uvuteni (Luhute), as well as natural lakes, including Misasa, Manze, and Nyamato. At the villages of Kisiju and Nganje, there are small sea ports where trade is conducted between residents of Dar es Salaam, Mafia, and Mkuranga, involving the export of fish, coconuts, and import of industrial goods.

=== Climate ===
The climate in Mkuranga District Council is tropical in nature but modified. With an annual average temperature of 280C, it is typically warm and humid. The drier months of October through March are the warmest, whereas May through August are comparatively moderate with temperatures about 25C. The two rainy seasons are the short rainy season (Vuli) from November to December and the long rainy season (Masika) from March to June. 800 to 1000 millimetres of rain fall annually on average. In the mornings, there is about 96% humidity, while in the afternoons, 67%. The southwest monsoon winds, which blow from April to October, and the northeast monsoon winds, which blow from November to March, both have an impact on the climate.

== Forests ==
Masanganya Forest Reserve, Vikindu Forest Reserve, Malenda Forest Reserve, and Mangrove Forest Reserve, along the Indian Ocean coast are among the four national forest reserves that make up Mkuranga District Council's 51km2 (or roughly 51,000 Ha) of total forest cover. While general land woods occupy 43,000 hectors, these natural forest reserves take up 8,000 hectors. Tree species include tectona grandis, newtonia, pterocarpos, brachystefia spp., Jubernadis, chlorophora, and others. Timber, charcoal, firewood, catchment values, and pharmaceuticals are examples of forest products.

== Economy ==
The Mkuranga district's economy is largely dependent on agriculture. The district's primary industry is agriculture, and 85% of the population is dependent on fisheries, forestry, and agricultural cultivation. The second-largest economic activity carried out by the 1,500 fishermen found along the coast is fishing. Mkuranga District's (Coast Region) per capita income is 360,000 TZS, or US$276.9 (US$0.75 per day).

=== Infrastructure ===
The District is home to 2 protected springs, 133 rainwater collection systems, 14 rivers, 477 shallow wells, and 154 deep wells. The council is making a lot of effort to enhance community access to clean and safe water by at least 21% from the current 51%. These initiatives would be carried out with the aid of the fast wins funds and other partners in District council development, like AMREF, which has started water projects in the District. Additionally, the District is carrying out 10 water supply projects in 10 chosen villages in the Bupu and Nyamato wards under the World Bank-donated Water Sector Development Programme.

==== Water ====
Water resources are abundant in the Mkuranga District, however diseases connected to water and sanitation are also frequent, as is water contamination. Mkuranga is one of the worst districts in Tanzania for access to piped or protected water sources, with only 9% of households having access to potable water (United Republic of Tanzania, 2005). Less than 40% of homes had latrines in 2002 due to the challenging construction of latrines in sandy collapsing soil for poor households. Adopted in 2002, a District Integrated Coastal Management (ICM) Action Plan acknowledges that one of the main problems is that people use the beach as a place to use the lavatory and dump their trash. Regulations and bylaws governing public health and sanitation are not consistently enforced.

=== Agriculture ===
Maize, cassava, sweet potatoes, and other leguminous crops make up the majority of the food crops planted in the Mkuranga area, while cashew nuts, coconuts, and tropical fruits such oranges, pineapples, mangoes, passion fruit, and watermelon are grown for commercial purposes. Agriculture is the only pre-occupation for almost 80% of the people. 48,000 households, on average, are thought to be involved in agriculture. Cassava is the most significant major reserve food crop planted in the district and is one of the key agricultural crops that are generally grown there. The government officials emphasise the cultivation of this crop since it can endure the current unfavourable weather conditions; at times of low rainfall, cassava (drought resistant crop) becomes the sole significant food source for the community.

After cassava, rice is the second most significant grain crop grown by native people. It is cultivated in marshy and irrigated places with the help of rivers, particularly in Yavayava Village. Paddy farmers employ native seed varieties. The district has 17,150 hectors, or 0.7% of its total area, suitable for growing paddy. However, only 254 of those hectors are currently being used for agriculture, leaving 99% of the available irrigation-ready land underutilized. The community raises cattle, goats, sheep, and chickens as its livestock. Due to the work of (HPT) Heifer Project Tanzania, which gave dairy cattle to farmers and then paid the help back by giving young calves to others, dairy farming is becoming increasingly prevalent in the Mkuranga district. Additionally, this network provides farmers with dairy goats and vaccinations.

=== Trade ===
The Mkuranga District Council is home to a variety of small and medium-sized businesses, including wholesalers, retailer stores, milling equipment, restaurants, butchers, pharmacies, garages, gasoline stations, guest rooms, local bars, salt farms, hardware stores, slaughterhouses, and bars especially in the wards bordering Dar es Salaam region.Other food crops grown in the district include peanuts, sweet potatoes, yams, and fruit (including watermelon, mangoes, oranges, lemons, and tangerines). Small-scale farmers cultivate them, and the crops are sold in the ward markets and in Dar es Salaam.

=== Tourism ===
The district does not currently have any National Parks or Game Reserved Areas. However, the District is home to many lion families, crocodiles that live in waterlogged places, hippos that live in areas with stagnant water bodies, and other small creatures. Additionally, the district has an animal corridor that leads from the Selous Game Reserve, where wild animals can occasionally be observed crossing.However the district's most visited location is the Vikindu Forest Reserve, home to Plain-baked sunbird and the Red forest duiker, both of which are unofficial district symbols.

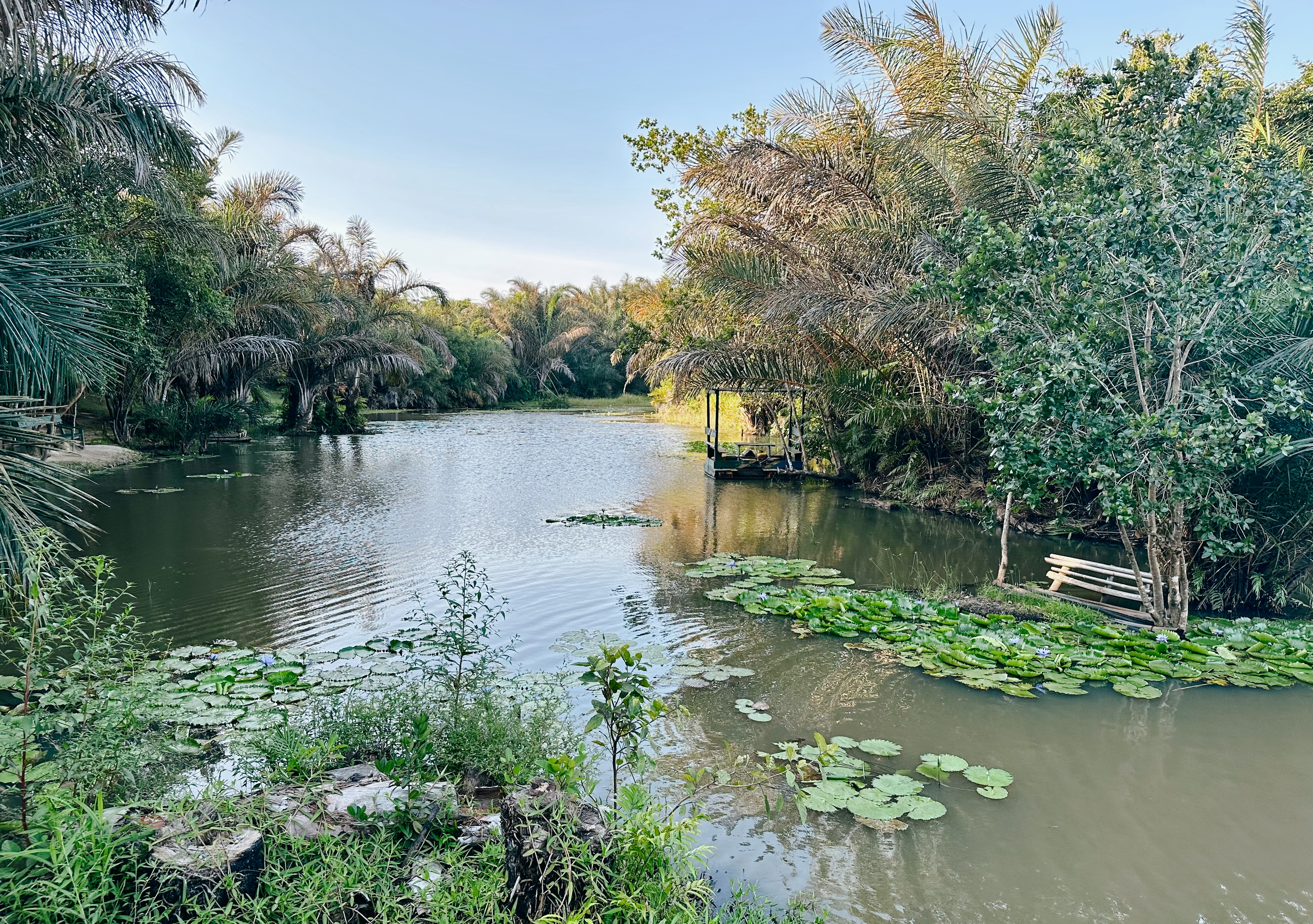
Lake Miwaleni in Vikindu Forest Reserve, Mkuranga DC, Pwani

=== Fishing ===
Mkuranga district has a large fishing industry, which also serves as a crucial supply of affordable and nutrient-rich protein for the community. The shoreline of Mkuranga, which stretches from the Temeke to the Rufiji districts, is around 90 kilometres long. The district is blessed with coral reefs, mangrove forests, and healthy fish stocks, much like much of coastal Tanzania. Shungubweni, Mpafu, Kerekese, Kisiju, Pwani, Mdimni, Magawa, and Kifumangao are the seven coastal communities where fishing predominates. Mkuranga has five islands that are part of the district fishing fleet; Kwale Island Koma Island, Pemba Juu Island, Chokaa Island and North Fanjove Island. As a result, Mkuranga now boasts a number of locations that are popular for fishing.

The major landing place for fisheries is in Kisiju Pwani, one of the district's ten recognised landing sites. The sole location where fish landings are documented is here. Approximately 98% of the district's total catches are caught by artisanal fishermen who fish for a living. Due to the limited range of fishing craft and vessels, fishing activities are concentrated in shallow waters close to shore.

== Demographics ==
The Mkuranga district is the historical homeland of the Ndengereko and Zaramo people. According to the 2002 National Population Census, there are 187,428 people living in the District, with 91,714 men and 95,714 women. Based on the current District Growth Rate of 3.5% annually, the District's expected population is 246,369, of which 118,257 (48%) are men and 128,112 (52%) are women.

== Health and education ==
=== Health ===
There are 35 health facilities in the Mkuranga District Council, including 1 hospital, 2 health centres, 32 dispensaries, 22 of which are controlled by the government, 5 by faith-based organisations, and 5 by the private sector. Malaria is a major source of morbidity and mortality for both outpatients and inpatients; the rate of baby and maternal mortality is 161/100,000 and 15/1000, respectively. 8% of the population is affected by HIV/AIDS.

=== Education ===
There are 108 primary schools in the district overall, of which 104 are public schools and 4 are private schools. 50174 students are enrolled in primary school across the district, in both public and private institutions.There are 31 secondary schools overall in the Mkuranga District Council. Whereas, 10 private schools and 21 public (government) schools were created as a result of community self-initiative.
