= North Fanjove Island =

Island in Pwani Region of Tanzania

- Location within Tanzania

Geography
- Location: Mafia Channel
- Coordinates: 7°20′08″S 39°28′39″E
- Length: 0.8 km (0.5 mi)
- Width: 0.2 km (0.12 mi)

Administration
- Tanzania
- Region: Pwani Region
- District: Mkuranga District
- Ward: Shungubweni

Demographics
- Languages: Swahili
- Ethnic groups: Ndengereko & Rufiji

North Fanjove Island (Kisiwa Cha Fanjove Kaskazini, in Swahili) is an island located in Shungubweni ward of Mkuranga District in southern Pwani Region of Tanzania.
