= Vikindu Forest Reserve =

Protected area in Pwani Region, Tanzania

- IUCN category IV (habitat/species management area)
- Location within Tanzania
- Location: Mkuranga District of Pwani Region; Tanzania
- Nearest city: Dar es Salaam
- Coordinates: 6°59′06″S 39°16′48″E
- Area: 17.1 km^{2} (6.6 mi^{2})
- Created: 1947
- Established: 2006
- Administrator: Tanzania Forest Service Agency (TFS)
- Website: Official Page

The Vikindu Forest Reserve (Hifadhi ya Msitu wa Vikindu, In Swahili) is a protected area located in Mkuranga District of Pwani Region in Tanzania that covers an area of 17.1 km^{2} (6.6 sq mi). Vikindu Forest Reserve is situated on a plain between 40 and 80 meters above sea level, about 15 kilometers inland from the Indian Ocean and about 17 kilometers south of Dar es Salaam on the main road to Kilwa. The main tarmac Dar es Salaam to Kilwa Road, which is part of the eastern edge of the forests reserve, provides access in all weather conditions. To the immediate south of the forest reserve is the village of Vikindu (on the major road).

== History ==
By declaration order Cap. 132 of 1947, p. 1347, which was replaced by Cap. 389-sup.59 of 1959, p. 59, Vikindu Forest Reserve was declared to no longer be a forest reserve. Originally surveyed during British rule, it was a reserve for virgin forests. Currently, the Tanzania Forest Services under the Ministry of Natural Resources and Tourism are in charge of the Vikindu Forest Reserve. The Mkuranga District Forest Conservator, who directly answers to the Zonal Commander, who in turn answers to the Conservation Commissioner for Tanzania Forest Services, is in charge of managing this forest reserve.

== Attractions ==
The Vikindu Forest Reserve vegetation is of the Coastal Forests type, which is significant both nationally and internationally because to its biological value and its importance as a source of water for millions of Tanzanians especially in the Temeke and Ilala Municipal councils. Both plant and animal species have a high degree of endemism in the VFR, and some of these species are in danger of going extinct as a result of human activity.

The primary effort over the years in Tanzania's natural forests, like many others, has been Vikindu Forest Reserve protection initiative. The preparation of an Action/Annual Plan of Operation (APO) occasionally relied on the Forest Act and Forest Policy to direct the implementation of activities, but most of the time depended on the funding sources of TFS Eastern Zone, DFM (Mkuranga), WCST, and WWF.

Adansonia digitata, and Afzelia, Julbernardia, Brachystegia, and Combretum species are abundant in Vikindu Forest Reserve's flora. As are dik-dik, black butterflies, white colobus, antelopes, wild wild pigs, pythons, butterflies, and beetles.
