= Kibiti District =

District of Pwani Region, Tanzania

Kibiti District Wilaya ya Kibiti (Swahili)
- District of Pwani
- From top to bottom
- Nickname: Home of the Rufiji Delta
- Kibiti District in Pwani
- Coordinates: 7°44′15″S 39°04′39″E
- Country: Tanzania
- Region: Pwani Region
- District: 2015
- Named for: Kibiti town
- Capital: Kibiti

Area
  - Total: 2,805 km^{2} (1,083 sq mi)
  - Rank: 5th in Pwani

Population (2012)
  - Total: 117,752
  - Rank: 4th in Pwani
  - Density: 41.98/km^{2} (108.7/sq mi)
- Demonym: Kibitian

Ethnic groups
  - Settler: Swahili
  - Native: Rufiji & Ndengereko
- Time zone: UTC+3 (EAT)
- Tanzanian Postcode: 618
- Website: Kibiti District Council
- Symbols of Tanzania
- Bird: Banded green sunbird
- Fish: Kibiti lampeye
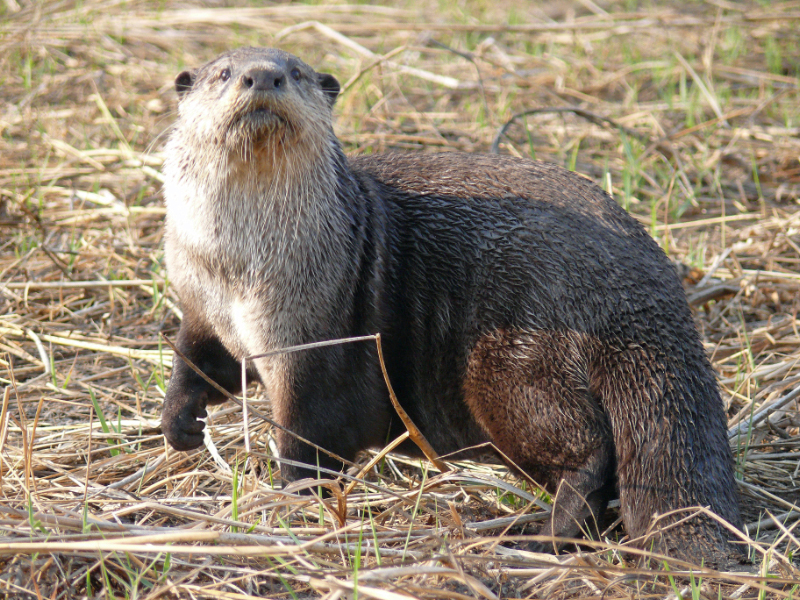
- Mammal: African clawless otter

Kibiti District Council (Wilaya ya Kibiti, in Swahili) is one of nine administrative districts of Pwani Region in Tanzania. The districts of Mkuranga District and Kisarawe District border the District to the northeast and northwest, respectively. The Mafia Channel forms the district's eastern boundary. The Rufiji District also forms a border to the south of Kibiti. The district covers an area of 2,805 km^{2} (1,083 sq mi). The district is comparable in size to the land area of Samoa. The district seat (capital) is the town of Kibiti. According to the 2012 census, the district has a total population of 117,752.

== Administrative subdivisions ==
The District is organised administratively into 16 Wards, 58 Villages, 269 Townships, 1 Small Town Authority, 1 Council, 1 Constituency, 3 Divisions (Mbwera, Kikale, and Kibiti), and 1 Council.

=== Wards ===
1. Dimani
2. Kibiti
3. Kiongoroni
4. Mahege
5. Maparoni
6. Mbuchi
7. Mchukwi
1. Mlazi
2. Msala
3. Mtawanya
4. Mwambao
5. Ruaruke
6. Salale

== Demographics ==
The district is the historic home of the Ndengereko and Rufiji peoples.In total, 122,648 persons (59,168 men and 63,480 women) were counted in the district during the 2012 Population and Housing Census.With a 1.9 percent population growth rate, Kibiti District Council is predicted to have 147,048 residents (71,422 men and 76,626 women) in 2022.
