= Kibiti lampeye =

Conservation status
- Vulnerable (IUCN 3.1)

Scientific classification
- Kingdom: Animalia
- Phylum: Chordata
- Class: Actinopterygii
- Division: Teleostei
- Order: Cyprinodontiformes
- Family: Procatopodidae
- Genus: Lacustricola
- Species: L. lacustris

Binomial name
- Lacustricola lacustris (Seegers, 1984)

Synonyms
- Aplocheilichthys lacustris

Species of fish

The Kibiti lampeye (Lacustricola lacustris) is a species of fish in the family Poeciliidae. It is endemic to Pwani Region of Tanzania. Its natural habitats are rivers and intermittent rivers. It is named after the Kibiti District, where it was first discovered.

== Sources ==
- Hanssens, M.; Snoeks, J. (2006). "Aplocheilichthys lacustris". IUCN Red List of Threatened Species. 2006 e.T60379A12343838. doi:10.2305/IUCN.UK.2006.RLTS.T60379A12343838.en.
