= Kazimzumbwi Forest Reserve =

Protected area in Pwani Region, Tanzania

- IUCN category IV (habitat/species management area)
- Location within Tanzania
- Location: Kisarawe District of Pwani Region, Tanzania
- Nearest city: Kisarawe & Dar es Salaam
- Coordinates: 6°53′20.4″S 39°5′20.4″E
- Area: 48.8 km^{2} (18.8 mi^{2})
- Designation: Nature Forest Reserve
- Established: 1936
- Governing body: Tanzania Forest Service Agency (TFS) under the Ministry of Natural Resources and Tourism
- Website: Official Page

The Kazimzumbwi Forest Reserve, officially listed as Pugu/Kazimzumbwi Nature Forest Reserve (Swahili: Msitu wa Akiba wa Kazimzumbwi) is a protected area located in Kisarawe ward of Kisarawe District in Pwani Region, Tanzania. It is located next to the Pugu ward of Ilala MC to the east, about 20 km (12 mi) south-west of Dar es Salaam. It covers an area of 4,887 hectares (12,080 acres), at an altitude between 120 and 180 m (390 and 590 ft). The reserve was established in 1936, but both agriculture and logging were tolerated for several years. Logging, in particular, went on until the 1970s.

The Kazimzubwi Forest and the adjacent Pugu Forest Reserve are reportedly the remainders of one of the oldest surviving forests in the world.
