= Koma Island =

Island in Pwani Region of Tanzania

- Location within Tanzania

Geography
- Location: Mafia Channel
- Coordinates: 7°32′37″S 39°23′45″E
- Length: 1.6 km (0.99 mi)
- Width: 1.4 km (0.87 mi)

Administration
- Tanzania
- Region: Pwani Region
- District: Mkuranga District
- Ward: Kisiju

Demographics
- Languages: Swahili
- Ethnic groups: Ndengereko & Rufiji

Koma Island also known as Charka Island (Kisiwa cha Koma, in Swahili) is an island located in Kisiju ward of Mkuranga District in southern Pwani Region of Tanzania. The only historical source to mention this island is by Arab navigator Ibn Majid in 1470. In 1996, Felix Chami discovered a small Early Iron Age (EIA) or Early Iron Working (EIW) site on Koma island. The TIW (triangular incised ware) pottery sherds, however, were absent in the island site, indicating that it was eventually abandoned. The Bantu settlement existed from the third to the sixth centuries.
