= Pugu Hills Forest Reserve =

Protected area in Pwani Region, Tanzania

- IUCN category IV (habitat/species management area)
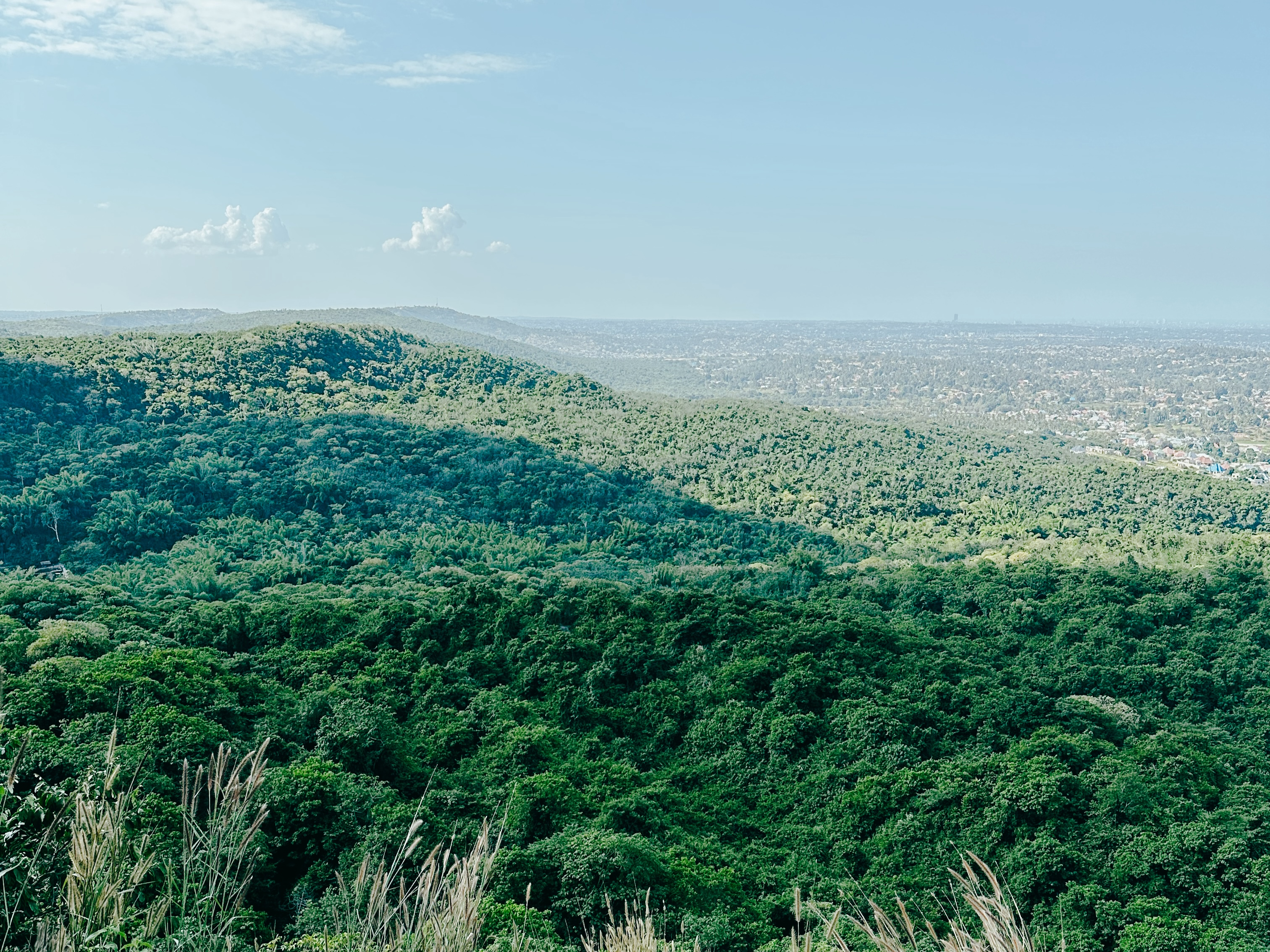
- Pugu Forest Reserve panorama

- Location within Tanzania
- Location: Kisarawe District of Pwani Region, Tanzania
- Nearest city: Kisarawe & Dar es Salaam
- Coordinates: 6°53′20.4″S 39°5′20.4″E
- Area: 120.1 km^{2} (46.4 mi^{2})
- Designation: Nature Forest Reserve
- Established: 2006
- Named for: Mpugupugu tree in Zaramo
- Governing body: Tanzania Forest Service Agency (TFS) under the Ministry of Natural Resources and Tourism
- Website: Official Page

The Pugu Hills Forest Reserve, officially listed as Pugu/Kazimzumbwi Nature Forest Reserve (Msitu wa Akiba wa Pugu, In Swahili) is a protected area located in Kisarawe ward of Kisarawe District in Pwani Region, Tanzania. The forest borders in the Pugu ward, of Ilala MC in Dar es Salaam to the east, adjacent to the Kazimzumbwi Forest Reserve. Together with Kazimzumbwi, the Pugu Forest (previously known as Mogo Forest) is part of what is considered to be one of the oldest forests in the world. The area is characterized by a large variety of endemic species of animals and plants.

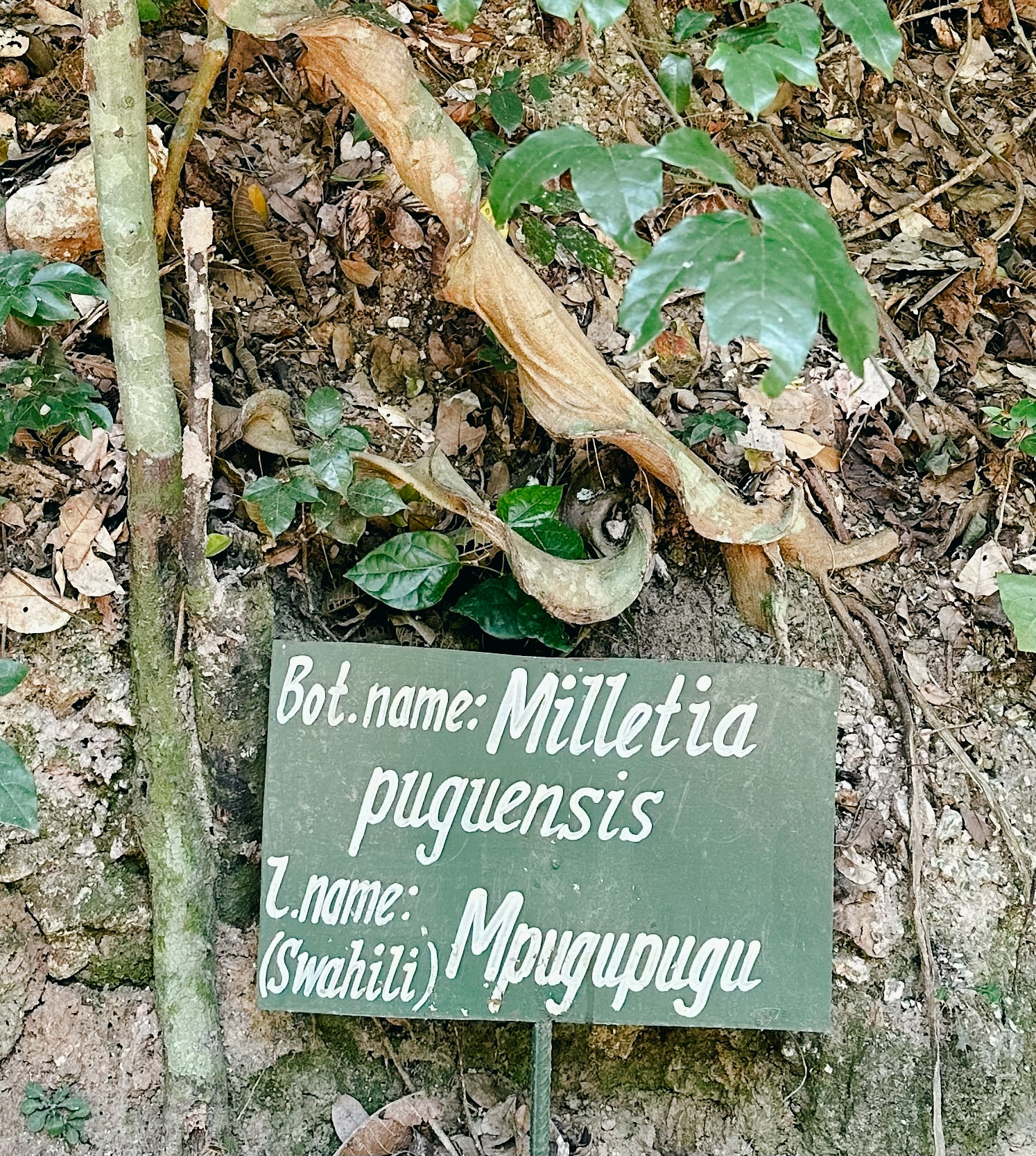
Milletia puguensis in Pugu Hills, Kisarawe, Kisarawe DC, Pwani

== Geography ==
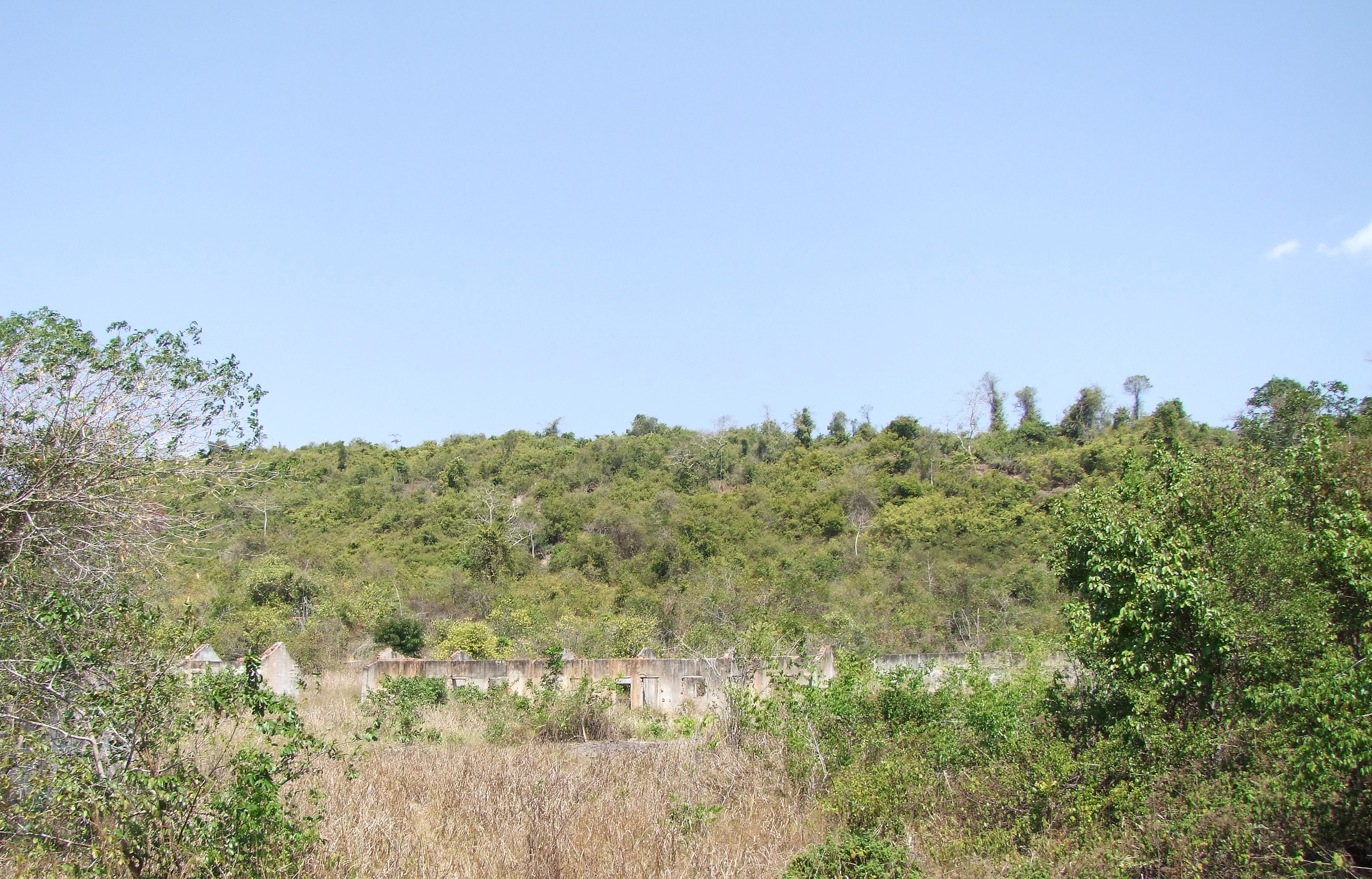
Former houses of German kaolinite miners

The 22 km^{2} reserve extends over a large hilly area south-west of Dar es Salaam, the nearest populated place being Kisarawe. The source of the Msimbazi river, that flows into the Indian Ocean in the surroundings of Dar, is inside the reserve. A large fraction of its vegetation is composed of evergreen plants, as rain is common and abundant throughout most of the year. One of the largest kaolinite deposits in the world is located inside the reserve.

== Fauna and flora ==
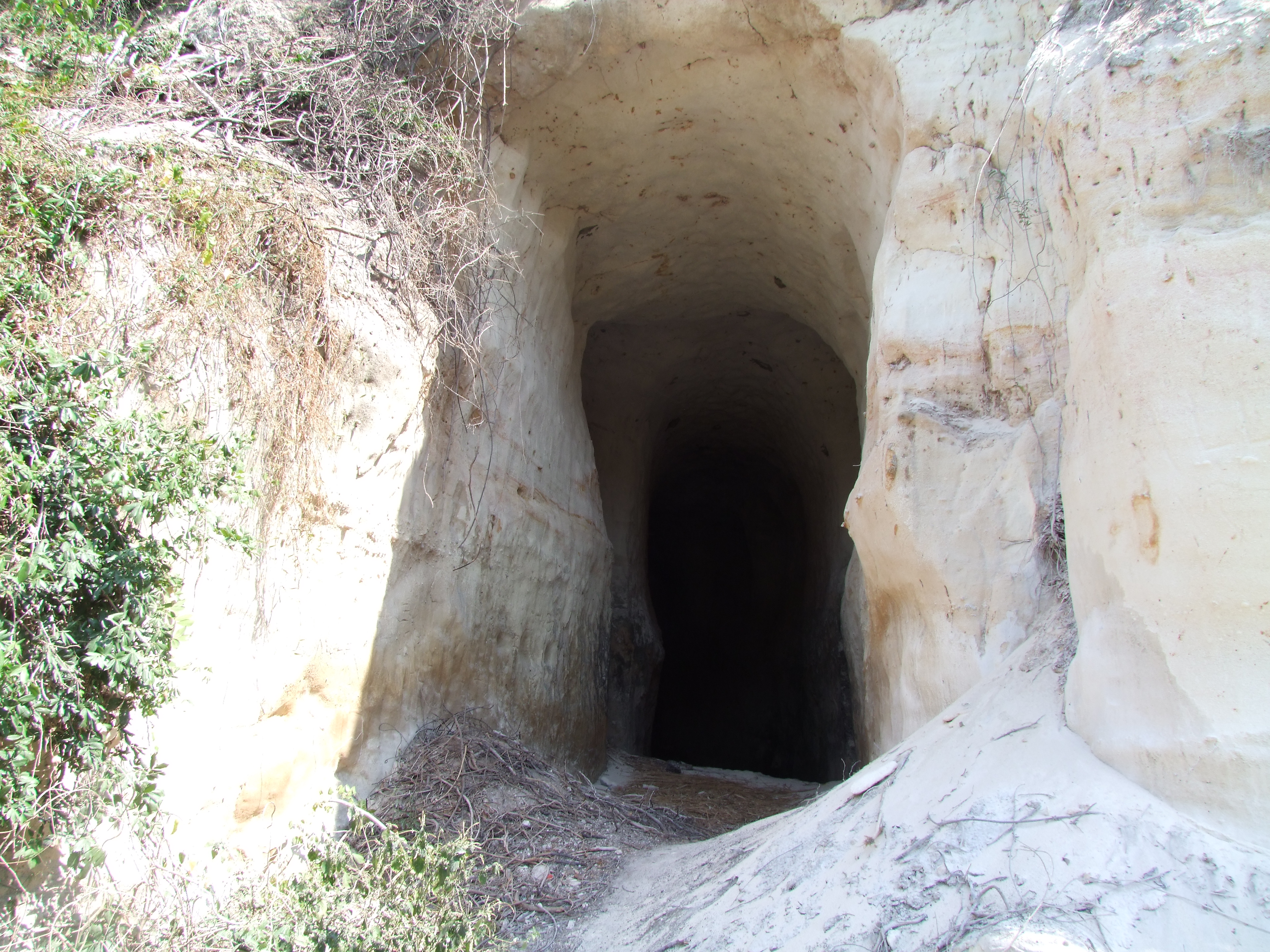
Former kaolinite mines now host bat colonies

The Pugu Forest has 14 endemic plant species, two mammalian endemic species, and one endemic subspecies of birds. Wildlife include, Dikdiks, common warthogs, African leopards, elephant shrews, mongooses, civets, galagos, side-striped jackals, black-backed jackals, baboons, alligators, colobuses, as well as over 80 species of birds. Lions used to live in the reserve, but none has been reported in recent times. Some natural and human-made caves host large colonies of bats, such as horseshoe bat, Tanzanian woolly bat and Hildegarde's tomb bat.

== Attractions ==
There are also enormous bamboo stands, the lake Minaki, bat caves, overlooks of Dar es Salaam City, places of worship, sacred ritual sites, the unique Mpugupugu tree (from which the reserve derives its name).

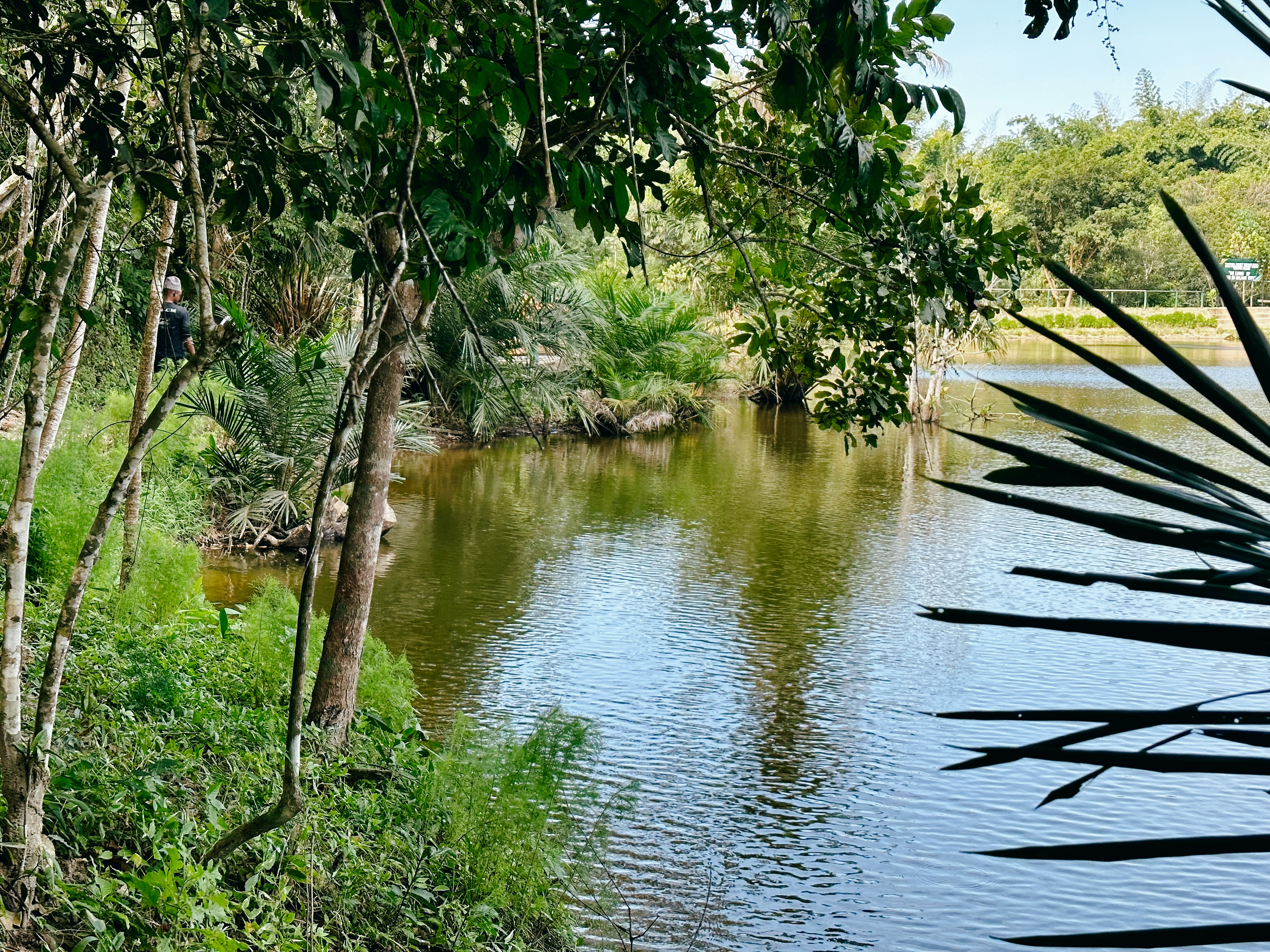
Lake Mnaki in Pugu Hills Forest Reserve, Kisarawe, Kisarawe DC, Pwani
