= Kisarawe District =

District of Pwani Region, Tanzania

Kisarawe District Wilaya ya Kisarawe (Swahili)
- District of Pwani
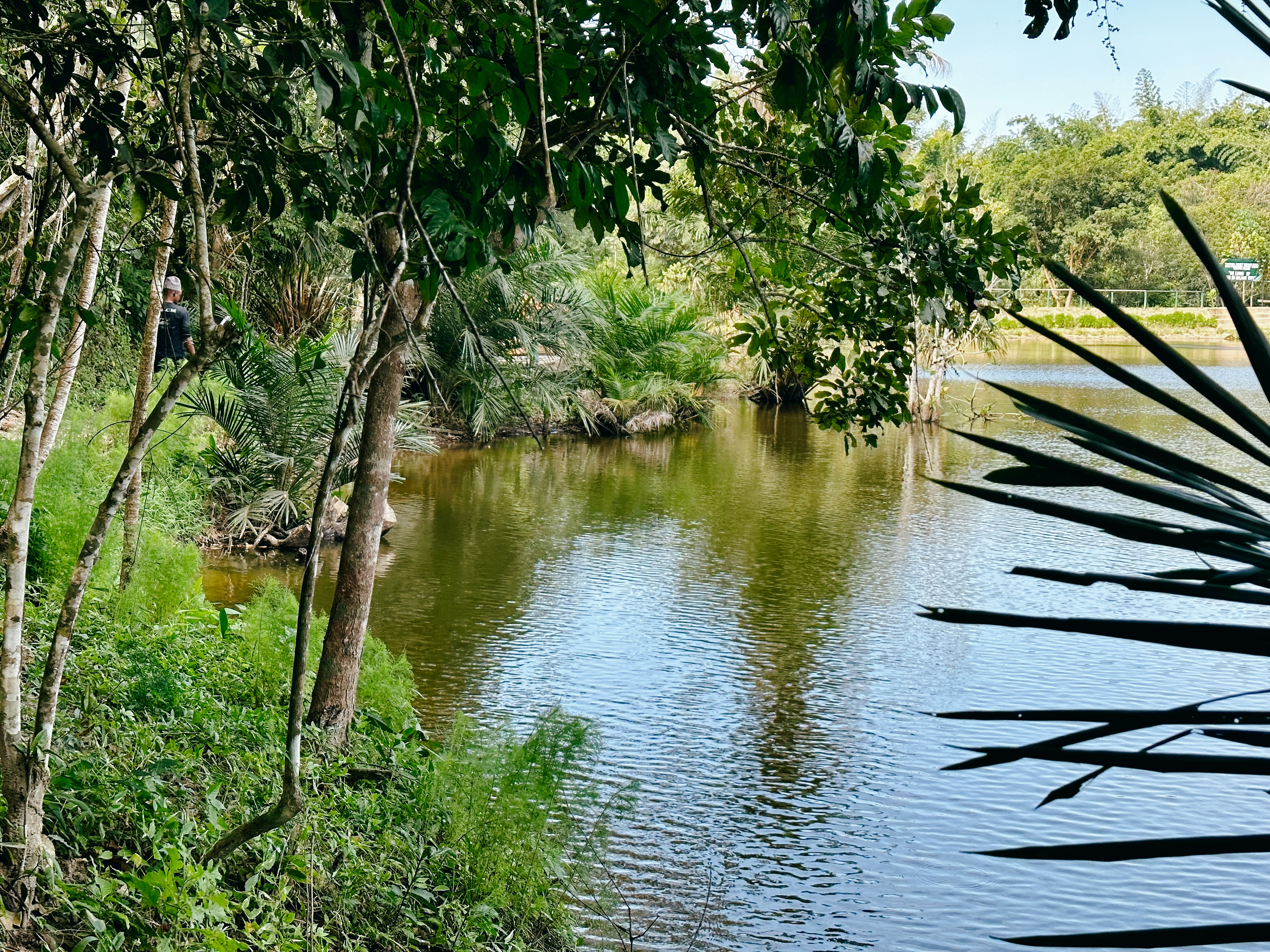
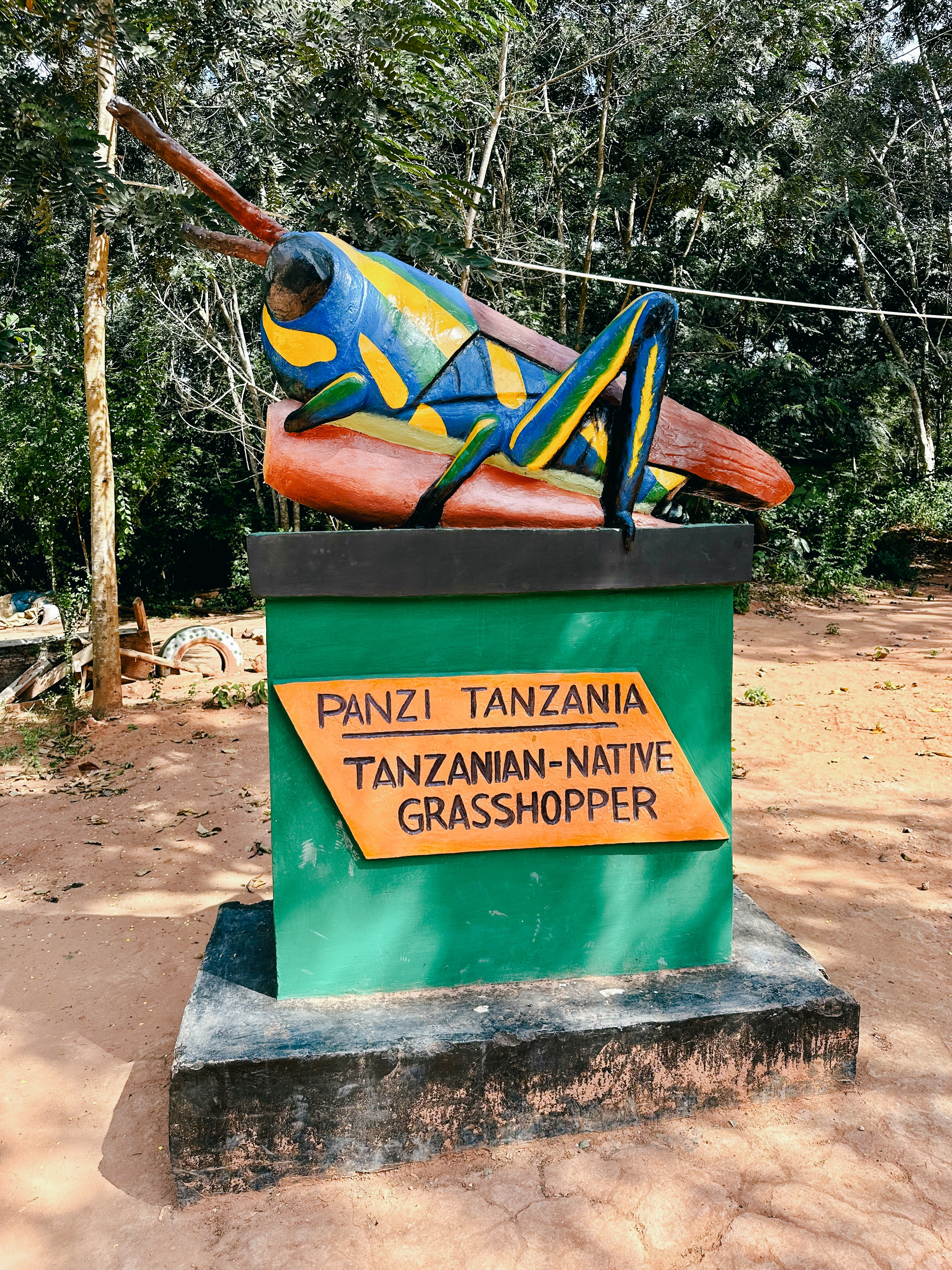
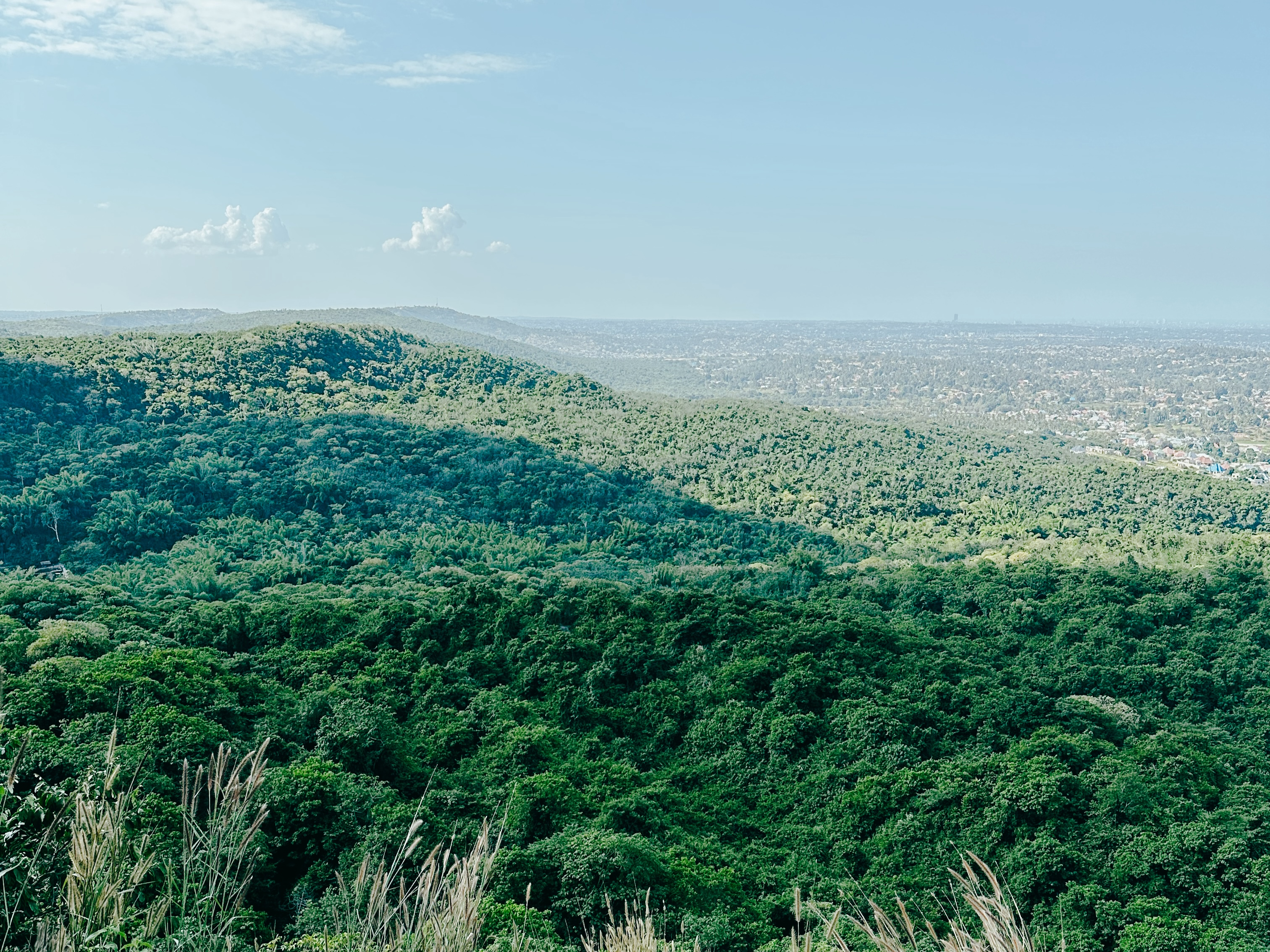
- From top to bottom: Minaki dam in Pugu Hills Forest Reserve of Kisarawe, Tanzanian Grasshopper sculpture in Kisarawe & View of Dar es Salaam from the Pugu Hills
- Nickname: Home of the Pugu Hills
- Kisarawe District in Pwani
- Coordinates: 7°15′44″S 38°44′12″E
- Country: Tanzania
- Region: Pwani Region
- Named for: Kisarawe Town
- Capital: Kisarawe

Area
  - Total: 5,031 km^{2} (1,942 sq mi)
  - Rank: 4th in Pwani

Population (2022)
  - Total: 159,226
  - Rank: 5th in Pwani
  - Density: 31.65/km^{2} (81.97/sq mi)

Ethnic groups
  - Settler: Swahili
  - Native: Zaramo & Ndengereko
- Time zone: UTC+3 (EAT)
- Tanzanian Postcode: 614
- Website: Kisarawe District Council
- Symbols of Tanzania
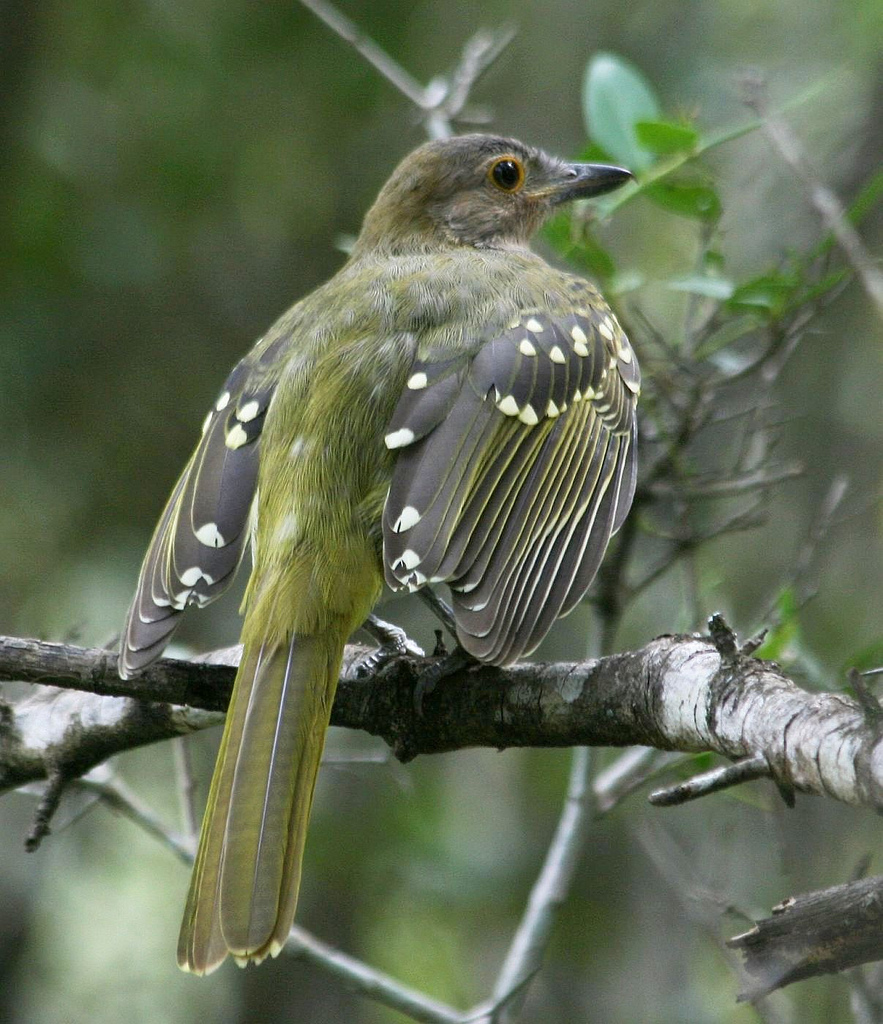
- Bird: Eastern Nicator

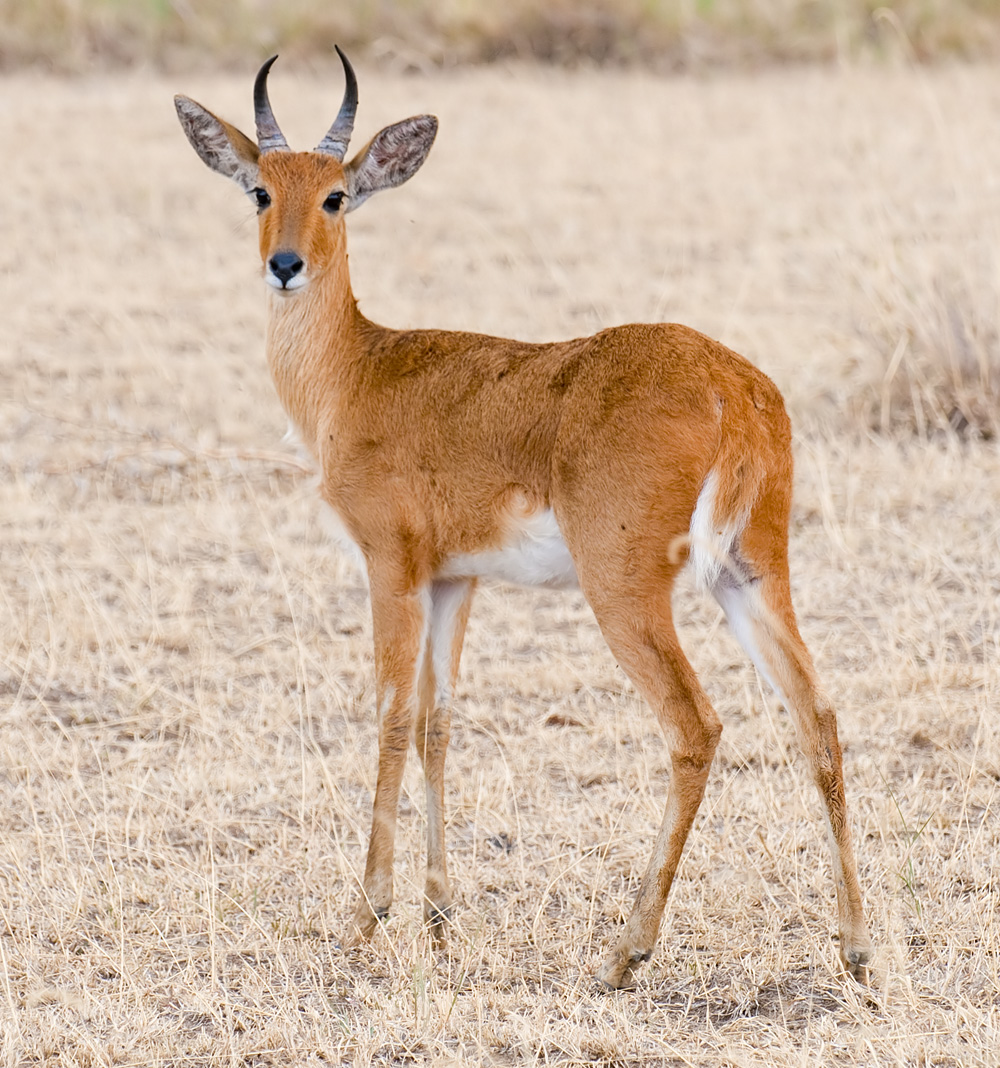
- Mammal: Bohor reedbuck

Kisarawe District Council (Wilaya ya Kisarawe, in Swahili) is one of eight administrative districts of Pwani Region in Tanzania. The District covers an area of 5,031 km^{2} (1,942 sq mi). It is bordered to the east by Dar es Salaam Region's Ilala and Ubungo Municipal Councils. The Kibaha District and Kibaha Town Council border the district to the north, and the Mkuranga District and Kibiti District border it to the south-east. By the Rufiji District to the south, and the Morogoro District of the Morogoro Region to the west. The district is comparable in size to the land area of Trinidad and Tobago. The town of Kisarawe serves as its administrative capital. According to the 2022 Tanzania National Census, the population of the District was 159,226.

== Administration ==
The district is divided into four administrative divisions, Mzenga, Chole, Sungwi, and Maneromango, each of which has 17 Wards and 235 hamlets. The Kisarawe District is administratively divided into 17 wards:

1. Boga
2. Chole
3. Kazimzumbwi
4. Kibuta
5. Kiluvya
6. Kisarawe
7. Kurui
8. Mafizi
9. Maneromango
1. Marui
2. Marumbo
3. Masaki
4. Msanga
5. Msimbu
6. Mzenga
7. Vihingo
8. Vikumburu

== Geography ==
Temperatures in the District range from 28 °C to 30 °C, with a mean of 29 °C. There are two main rainy seasons: the short rains, or "Vuli," begin in October and go through December, while the long rains begin in March and last through early June. The district's eastern portion, which includes the Sungwi division, averages 1400 to 1,600 millimetres of rain per year; the western portion, which includes the Chole and Mzenga divisions, averages 1000 millimetres.

== Economy ==
In Kisarawe, the agricultural sector employs practically all of the population. Cassava, coconuts, and cashew nuts are among the principal cash crops. Tropical fruits like mangoes, jackfruit, and pineapple are also abundantly grown. Grown food crops include sweet potatoes, maize, rice, sorghum, and cassava (a major food). A total of 30,000 hectares, or 0.78%, of the district's 380,000 hectares of arable land have been cultivated. Numerous crops can be cultivated because to the rich soil and abundant rainfall in the district. The primary crop farmed in Kisarawe is cassava, which is both a food crop and a source of income. The best cassava in the area is grown in Kisarawe, and the biggest cassava markets are in Dar es Salaam, Kibaha, Mkuranga, and Rufiji.

=== Trade ===
The District does not have any other major industrial enterprises other from a privately owned cement factory in Kisarawe Town; a detergent factory is currently being built. The district has designated a 500 Ha industrial area in Visegese, Kisarawe ward, as a designated location for investments in the manufacturing businesses.

=== Tourism and natural resources ===
A significant portion of the forest reserves in the Kisarawe District provide many of the district's resources. Up until 2006, there were five forest reserves totaling roughly 10,588.5 Hectares, namely; Masanganya Forest Reserve, Chakenge Forest Reserve, Pugu Hills Forest Reserve, Kazimzumbwi Forest Reserve, and Kisanga Forest Reserve.

== Demographics ==
Kisarawe is the ancestral home of the Zaramo people. The district has a total population of 101,598 as of the 2012 Census, 50,631 males and 50,967 females, with an annual growth rate of 2.1% and an average family size of 4 people.
